= Quoile Bridge =

Railway bridge in Northern Ireland

Coordinates: 54°19′53″N 5°44′09″W

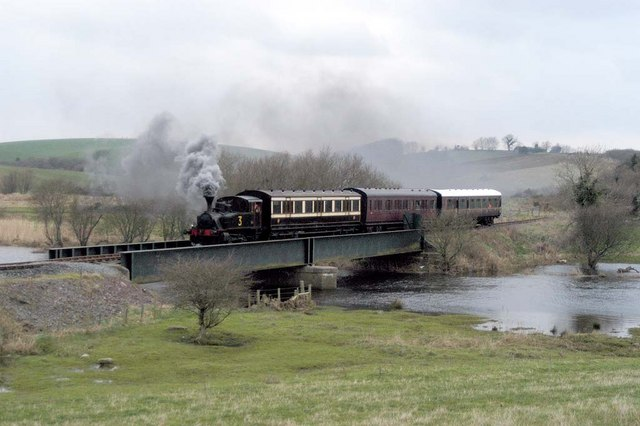
O&K No. 3 crossing the Quoile Bridge in 2006.

The Quoile Bridge is a railway bridge across the River Quoile in Downpatrick, County Down, Northern Ireland. It is 43 metres (141 ft) long and carries a single-track line.

== History ==
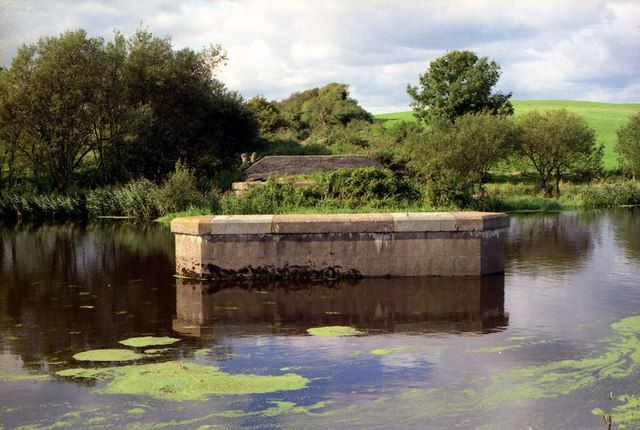
The centre pier in 1988, 38 years after closure. It would be another 11 years before trains would cross the Quoile.

=== Belfast & County Down Railway ===
The original bridge was constructed in 1859, one of the few river crossings on the Belfast and County Down Railway. It carried trains from Queen's Quay to Downpatrick and Newcastle. This bridge was made of timber piles with lattice trusses, and was replaced in 1929 with a steel girder bridge. After the railway was closed by the Ulster Transport Authority in 1950 (Having taken it over just two years prior), the bridge was abandoned and the girders and deck removed, through the concrete abutments and centre pier remained.

=== Downpatrick & County Down Railway ===
In 1999, Northern Ireland's only Irish standard gauge heritage railway, the Downpatrick and County Down Railway. began reconstructing the line from Downpatrick towards Belfast. This meant reconstructing the Quoile Bridge, which was done with £110,000 1929-replica girders fabricated in Dunmurry and brought to Downpatrick by lorry. The bridge opened to passenger traffic in 2004.

== Today ==
The Quoile Bridge is one of the most notable features of the Downpatrick & Co. Down Railway. It carries their 'North Line' from Downpatrick to Inch Abbey railway station and sees regular use, carrying over 10 trains per day on the weekends around St. Patrick's Day, May Day, Easter, the summer holidays and New Year's.
