= King Magnus' Halt railway station =

Heritage railway station in County Down, Northern Ireland

King Magnus' Halt
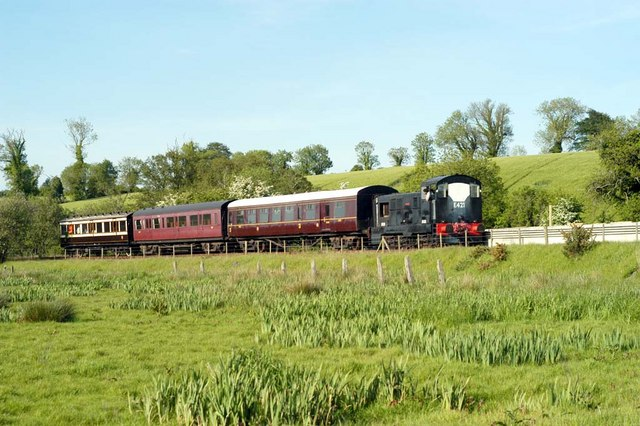

General information
- Other names: Magnus Grave
- Location: Downpatrick, County Down; Northern Ireland
- Owner: Downpatrick and County Down Railway
- Operator: Downpatrick and County Down Railway
- Line: South Line
- Platforms: 1

Key dates
- 1995: Opened
Route map
Location

King Magnus' Halt, more commonly known as Magnus' Grave, is a heritage railway station on the Downpatrick and County Down Railway's South Line, located on the outskirts of the town of Downpatrick in County Down, Northern Ireland. It takes its name from the nearby grave of Viking King Magnus Barefoot, a local tourist attraction that was not easily accessible prior to the arrival of the railway.

The station consists of a simple curved concrete platform, overlooking the burial site of Magnus Barefoot on one side and the Quoile Marshes and Hollymount Forest on the other. It is located on the same alignment as the former Belfast and County Down Railway mainline from Belfast to Newcastle, though no halt was ever provided at its location in BCDR days. Although Magnus Grave is a terminus station, the track continues on through a cutting and southwards for another kilometre. This section of track is currently mothballed.

== History ==
=== Viking Connection ===
Magnus Olafsson was the Viking King of Norway from 1093 to 1103. During his reign, Olafsson set his sights on Ireland and Scotland with the aim of controlling Norse communities in coastal areas on both sides of the Irish Sea. After an unsuccessful Irish Sea campaign in 1098, Olafsson landed in Ireland in 1101. A marriage between his son and the daughter of High King Muirchertach Ua Briain meant that Olafsson was able to gain control of Dublin, becoming known as Magnus Barefoot due to his wearing of a Gaelic tunic which left his lower legs exposed.

Muirchertach planned to use Olafsson's assistance to crush his rival Domnall Ua Lochlainn, but following their defeat at the Battle of Mag Coba (in present-day County Down), Muirchertach began to fear that Olafsson had set his sights on the Irish throne. This caused Olafsson and his men to flee into the country on 24 August 1103, where they were mistaken near Downpatrick for cattle raiders by the Ulaid and attacked. Olafsson survived being stabbed through both thighs, but was killed shortly afterwards by an axe blow to the neck.

Olafsson was the last Norwegian king to fall in battle abroad, and is regarded by some as the final Viking king. He was buried in a barrow approximately a kilometre to the south-west of Downpatrick, and would remain largely unknown and undisturbed for almost 900 years.

=== Arrival of the Railway ===
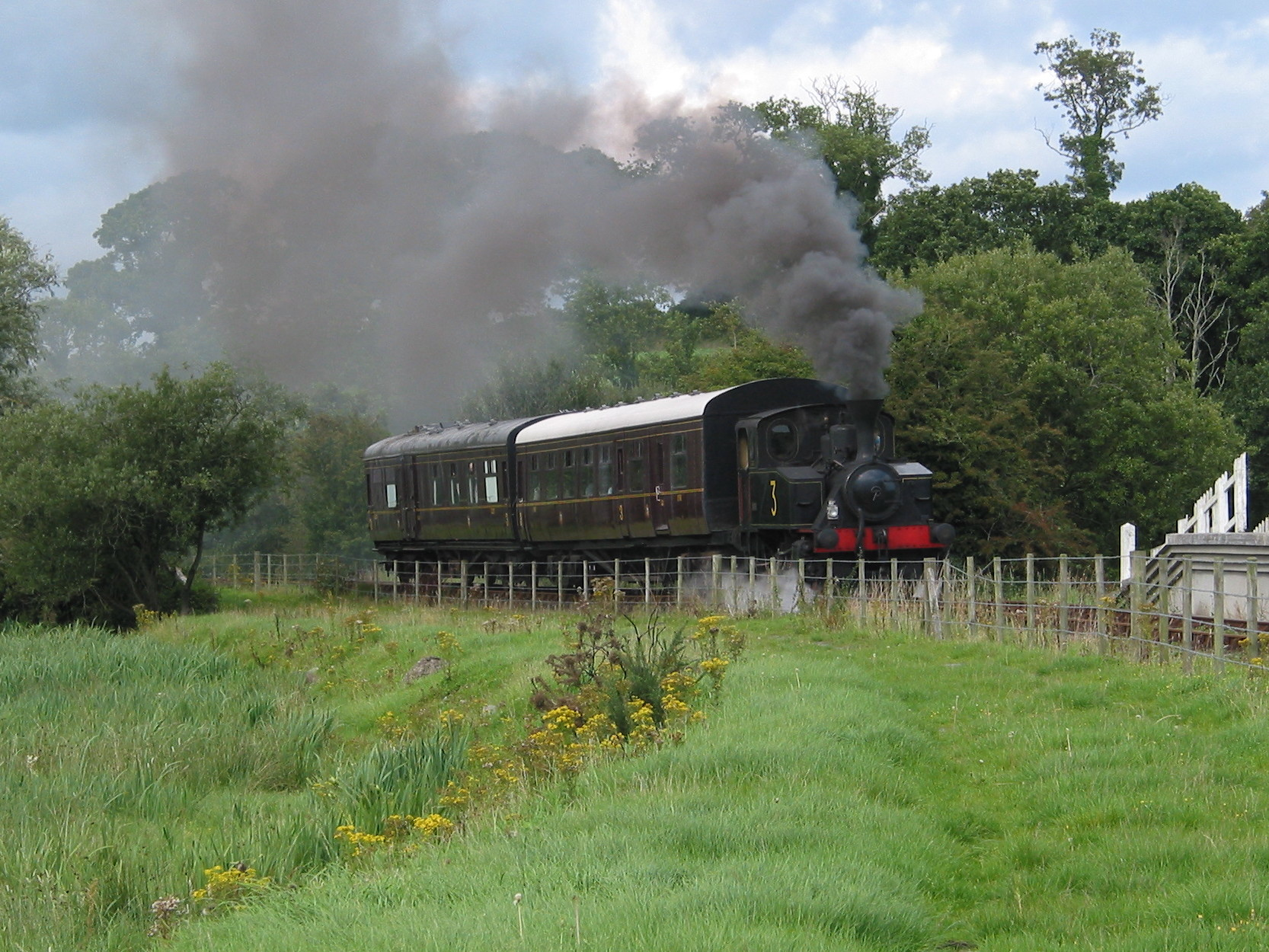
O&K No. 3 approaching Magnus Grave.

A railway line was opened between Downpatrick and Newcastle in 1869 which skirted the field Magnus Barefoot was buried in, but no halt or public access was provided – this remained the case when the branch line to Ardglass was opened in 1892, the new line joining the Newcastle Line a mere 80 metres away from his burial site overlooked by Downpatrick South signal cabin.

The Ardglass and Newcastle lines both closed in 1950, with the tracks being torn up and the signal cabin being demolished soon after. In 1995 part of the old Newcastle line was restored by the Downpatrick and County Down Railway, who opened a halt for the first time at the site of Magnus Barefoot's grave. In March 2003 a runestone was placed on the barrow to mark the 900th anniversary of his death, clearly visible from the halt.

From 1995 to 2005 Magnus Grave was the terminus of most DCDR trains, however this changed in 2005 with the opening of the North Line to Inch Abbey. Today, it is generally used only in the Autumn and Winter months with a particular focus on Halloween. It is anticipated that once the South Line is extended to Ballydugan it, along with Magnus Grave, will see more use.

== Services ==
Preceding station	Heritage railways	Following station
Downpatrick Loop Platform	Downpatrick and County Down Railway; South Line	Terminus
	Proposed Heritage railways	
Downpatrick Loop Platform	Downpatrick and County Down Railway; South Line	Ballydugan
