= Downpatrick Loop Platform railway station =

Heritage railway station in County Down, Northern Ireland

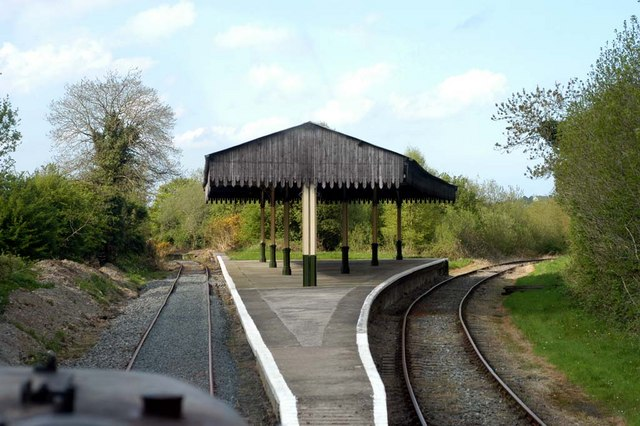

General information
- Location: Downpatrick, County Down; Northern Ireland
- Owner: Downpatrick and County Down Railway
- Operator: Downpatrick and County Down Railway
- Lines: South Line; Loop Line
- Platforms: 2

History
- Original company: Belfast and County Down Railway
- Pre-grouping: Belfast and County Down Railway
- Post-grouping: Ulster Transport Authority

Key dates
- 8 July 1892: Opened
- 16 January 1950: Closed
- 5 December 1987: Reopened by DCDR
Route map
Location

Downpatrick Loop Platform railway station (often shorted to The Loop Platform or simply The Loop) is a junction station owned and operated by the Downpatrick and County Down Railway, heritage railway in Northern Ireland.

The station is on the only operational railway triangle on a preserved railway. It can only be accessed by train – similar to Manulla Junction in County Mayo or Smallbrook Junction on the Isle of Wight.

== History ==
=== Belfast and County Down Railway ===
The original Downpatrick railway station was constructed as part of the Belfast and County Down Railway (BCDR) mainline from Queens Quay, Belfast to Downpatrick. However, with growing railway expansion in the Victorian era and the connecting Downpatrick, Dundrum and Newcastle Railway being subsequently built with a junction north of Downpatrick for through trains between Queens Quay, Belfast and Newcastle railway station (County Down). The awkward permanent way with Downpatrick railway station being on a branch necessitated the construction of the triangle and Loop platform. Therefore, trains could call at Downpatrick or use the avoiding line with connections for passengers and goods at the Loop Platform, thereby making the railway operationally from a signalling point of view, more efficient using a railway triangle.

Downpatrick Loop Platform was opened on 24 July 1892 and closed on 16 January 1950.

=== Downpatrick and County Down Railway ===
Because the Loop Platform had no road access, it was spared demolition unlike most of the BCDR mainline from Belfast Queen's Quay to Newcastle. It remained derelict from its closure in 1950 until the Autumn of 1987, when the Downpatrick & Ardglass Railway (since renamed the Downpatrick and County Down Railway) reached the Loop Platform with rebuilt track from Downpatrick town. The first train to call at the Loop Platform since its closure was a works train hauled by a former CIÉ E Class diesel on 10 October 1987. Passenger services began on 5 December 1987. In January 1993, the canopy was restored with funding from the International Fund for Ireland.

In Spring 2014, the Loop Line (The former mainline which avoided Downpatrick) was re-laid and the platform refurbished. During 2015, relaying commenced on the South Line (The direct line to Downpatrick).

Due to its isolated nature and simplistic features, it is a popular filming location. It served as Polegate Junction in Agatha and the Truth of Murder, as well as Derry Girls Season 3 episode Strangers on a Train and Moorheart station in Crookhaven episode Word to the Wise.

== Services ==
Preceding station	Historical railways	Following station
Downpatrick	Belfast and County Down Railway; Belfast-Newcastle	Tullymurry
King's Bridge Halt	Belfast and County Down Railway; Belfast-Newcastle	Tullymurry
Downpatrick	Downpatrick, Dundrum and Newcastle Railway; Downpatrick-Newcastle	Tullymurry
Downpatrick	Downpatrick, Killough and Ardglass Railway; Downpatrick-Ardglass	Downpatrick Racecourse
	Heritage railways	
Downpatrick	Downpatrick and County Down Railway; South Line	Magnus Grave
Inch Abbey	Downpatrick and County Down Railway; Loop Line	Magnus Grave

== Gallery ==
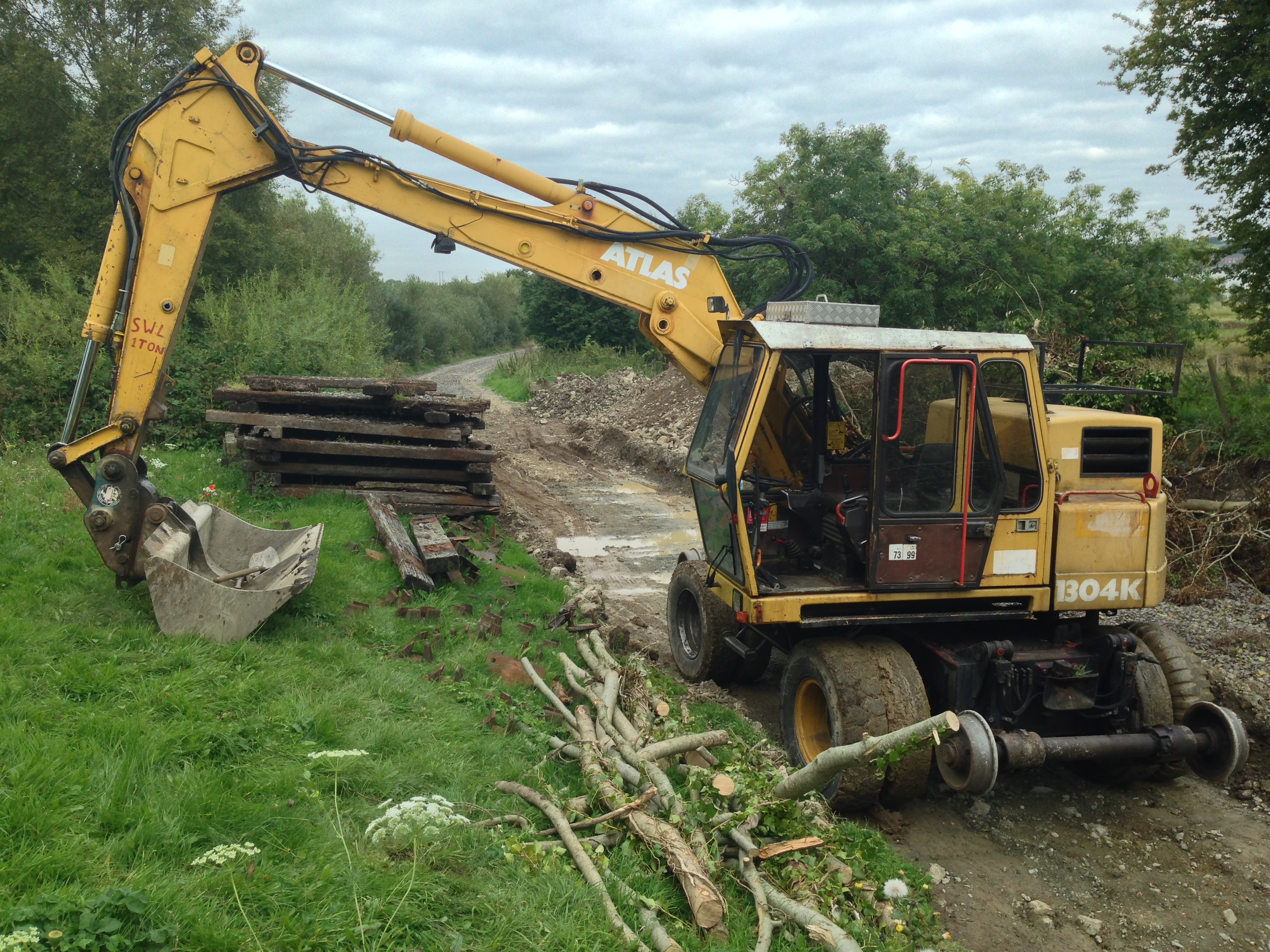
A road-rail digger being used to re-lay the line at the Loop Platform.

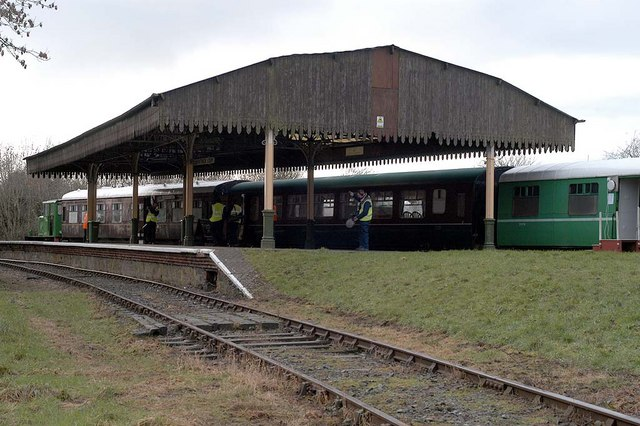
View of the Loop Platform looking south.

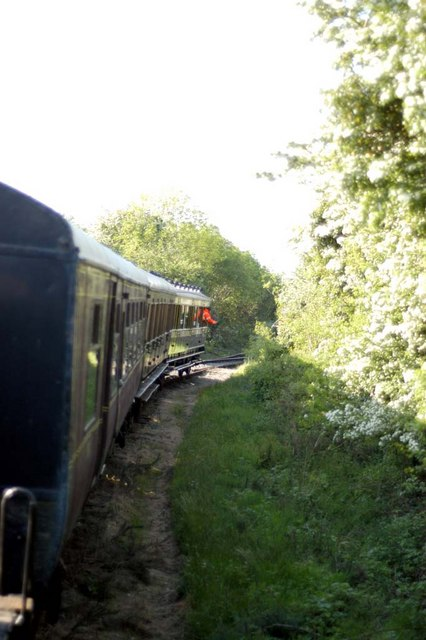
Approaching the Loop Platform from the south.
