= Castlewellan railway station =

Railway station in County Down, Northern Ireland

Coordinates: 54.261084°N 5.92456°W

Castlewellan
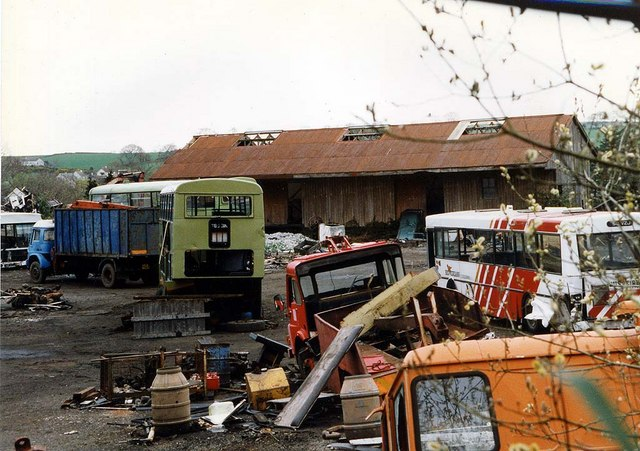
- Remains of Castlewellan railway station - now an industrial estate

General information
- Location: Castlewellan, County Down; Northern Ireland

Other information
- Status: Disused

History
- Original company: Great Northern Railway (Ireland)
- Pre-grouping: Great Northern Railway (Ireland)
- Post-grouping: Great Northern Railway (Ireland)

Key dates
- 24 March 1906: Station opens
- 2 May 1955: Station closes
Location

Castlewellan railway station was on the Great Northern Railway (Ireland). It was located in the village of Castlewellan.

== History ==
The station was opened by the Great Northern Railway (Ireland) on 24 March 1906 with the opening of its line to Banbridge, and the opening of the Belfast and County Down Railway line from Newcastle.

The BCDR's line from Belfast (Queen's Quay) to Newcastle via Downpatrick closed on 16 January 1950, but the GNR continued to operate services from Banbridge to Newcastle via Castlewellan until final closure of the line on 2 May 1955.

Preceding station	Historical railways	Following station
Leitrim	Great Northern Railway (Ireland); Banbridge-Castlewellan	Terminus
Terminus	Belfast and County Down Railway; Castlewellan-Newcastle	Newcastle

== The site today ==
From the mid-2000s the site has been used as an industrial estate consisting of three blocks of light industrial units. Tenants include self storage units, a gym, kids gymnastics centre, tile and bathroom shop, motor factors and a tyre fitting depot.
