= Agatha and the Truth of Murder =

- Poster
- Genre: Crime; Mystery
- Written by: Tom Dalton
- Directed by: Terry Loane
- Starring: Ruth Bradley; Pippa Haywood; Ralph Ineson; Tim McInnerny; Blake Harrison; Samantha Spiro; Joshua Silver; Luke Pierre
- Theme music composer: Andrew Simon McAllister
- Country of origin: United Kingdom
- Original language: English

Production
- Executive producers: Emily Dalton; Tom Dalton; Chamoun Issa
- Producer: Brett Wilson
- Production location: Northern Ireland
- Cinematography: Damien Elliott
- Editors: Claire Pringle; Zsófi Tálas
- Running time: 93 Minutes
- Production company: Darlow Smithson Productions

Original release
- Network: Channel 5
- Release: 23 December 2018

Agatha and the Truth of Murder is a 2018 British alternative history drama film about crime writer Agatha Christie becoming embroiled in a real-life murder case during her 11-day disappearance in 1926. Written by Tom Dalton, it depicts Christie investigating the murder of Florence Nightingale's goddaughter, Florence Nightingale Shore, which is based on real people and events, and how her involvement in this case influenced her subsequent writing.

The film premiered on Channel 5 in the United Kingdom on 23 December 2018; becoming the network's most popular programme of the Christmas period and the second-highest rated fictional programme of the year.

It is the first in a series of Christie films penned by Dalton. It was followed by Agatha and the Curse of Ishtar and Agatha and the Midnight Murders.

== Plot ==
In 1926, Agatha Christie finds herself in a difficult place when her writing is thwarted by predictable plot lines and her unfaithful husband pushes her for a divorce she does not want. As she searches for a way to revive her novel development, she is approached by Mabel Rogers, who is seeking help in solving the murder in 1920 of her partner, Florence Nightingale Shore, who had been bludgeoned to death on a train. Though initially reluctant to undertake a private investigation, Christie goes undercover while the nation searches for her whereabouts.

Calling herself Mary Westmacott (an early Christie pseudonym), she gathers all the suspects in the attack in a country house under the pretext of determining their share of a large inheritance from a fictitious American businessman, with herself as the representative of a law firm and Mabel acting as housekeeper and cook. The suspects include Daphne Miller, a young woman whose nursing career Florence could have ruined if she had lived; Randolph, Florence's cousin who inherited her money; Zaki Hanachi, a French soldier of Algerian ancestry whom she helped recover after the war and who may have been asking her for money; Travis Pickford, a boxer and black marketer who was interviewed by the police; and Mrs. Pamela Rose, the woman Florence was travelling to see. Daphne is accompanied by her abusive father Wade, and Mrs. Rose by her son Franklin, a former chaplain. Mabel is able to search the guests' bags, and finds that Wade Miller may have a pistol with him. To try and force a reaction from the others, Christie announces after the first interview that Daphne will get the biggest share of the inheritance.

Events take a turn when Daphne's father is shot dead. Detective Inspector Dicks arrives with a single constable, complaining that he is shorthanded because of the hunt for Agatha Christie, and that because of this he must conduct the investigation at the house instead of the police station. It is quickly discovered that they have been gathered together under false pretenses, and Christie changes her story to suit. Mabel is found in possession of the murder weapon and arrested. Dicks reveals to Christie that he knows who she is. He also knows that Daphne shot her father. Christie, having found a vital detail in Florence's diary, tells him she knows who attacked Florence and asks for his help. They spring a trap to get Pamela Rose and her son to admit their involvement. Even after Dicks and others overhear the conversation, the evidence is too thin to convict them, despite there being proof that they wrote a note blackmailing Daphne into planting the gun in Mabel's room. Instead, the others conspire to frame Florence's killers for the murder of Daphne's father.

Inspector Dicks helps Christie set up the cover story for her disappearance and inadvertently helps her get the idea for a new book. She is shown later completing a manuscript which appears to be Death on the Nile.

== Cast ==
Closing credits in alphabetical order.

- Dean Andrews as Wade Miller
- Ruth Bradley as Agatha Christie
- Bebe Cave as Daphne Miller
- Amelia Rose Dell as Rosalind
- Richard Doubleday as Postmaster Wilson
- Derek Halligan as Mr Todd, caretaker at the country house
- Blake Harrison as Travis Pickford
- Pippa Haywood as Mabel Rogers
- Stacha Hicks as Florence Nightingale Shore
- Ralph Ineson as Detective Inspector Dicks
- Brian McCardie as Sir Hugh Persimmion
- Michael McElhatton as Sir Arthur Conan Doyle
- Tim McInnerny as Randolph
- Clare McMahon as Carlo, Christie's secretary.
- Liam McMahon as Archibald Christie
- Seamus O'Hara as PC Spencer
- Luke Pierre as Zaki Hanachi
- Joshua Silver as Franklin Rose
- Samantha Spiro as Pamela Rose

== Production ==
Filming took place from 2 October to 22 October 2018 in Northern Ireland. Locations included Grey Abbey House in Greyabbey, Royal Belfast Golf Course, and Ulster Folk and Transport Museum. The train scenes were shot at the Downpatrick and County Down Railway, using both Downpatrick station and the Loop Platform, the latter of which was dressed as Polegate Junction.

Agatha and the Truth of Murder was produced by Brett Wilson and directed by Terry Loane, and stars Ruth Bradley in the eponymous role of Agatha Christie. Bradley admitted to feeling pressure playing Christie and used the biography by Laura Thompson (Agatha Christie: An English Mystery, 2007) "like a bible".

== Sequels ==
Dalton has written two further follow-up films Agatha and the Curse of Ishtar and Agatha and the Midnight Murders.

== Release ==
=== Broadcast ===
Agatha and the Truth of Murder premiered in the UK on Channel 5, on 23 December 2018, at 9 pm.

=== Home media ===
The film was released in Canada and the United States as VOD on Netflix on 31 January 2019.
