= Downpatrick Racecourse Platform railway station =

Railway station in Downpatrick, Northern Ireland

Coordinates: 54.315572°N 5.733232°W

Downpatrick Racecourse Platform

General information
- Location: Downpatrick, County Down; Northern Ireland

Other information
- Status: Disused

History
- Original company: Downpatrick, Killough and Ardglass Railway
- Pre-grouping: Belfast and County Down Railway
- Post-grouping: Belfast and County Down Railway

Key dates
- 8 March 1893: Station opens
- 16 January 1950: Station closes
Location

Downpatrick Racecourse Platform railway station was an exchange platform on the Downpatrick, Killough and Ardglass Railway, which ran from Downpatrick to Ardglass in Northern Ireland.

== History ==
Opened by the Downpatrick, Killough and Ardglass Railway, it became part of the Belfast and County Down Railway. It was only used on race days.

The station closed to passengers in 1950, by which time it had been taken over by the Ulster Transport Authority.

== Routes ==
Preceding station	Historical railways	Following station
Downpatrick Loop	Belfast and County Down Railway; Belfast-Ardglass	Ballynoe
