= Inch Abbey =

Ruined monastery in County Down, Northern Ireland

Coordinates: 54.3366178°N 5.7295675°W

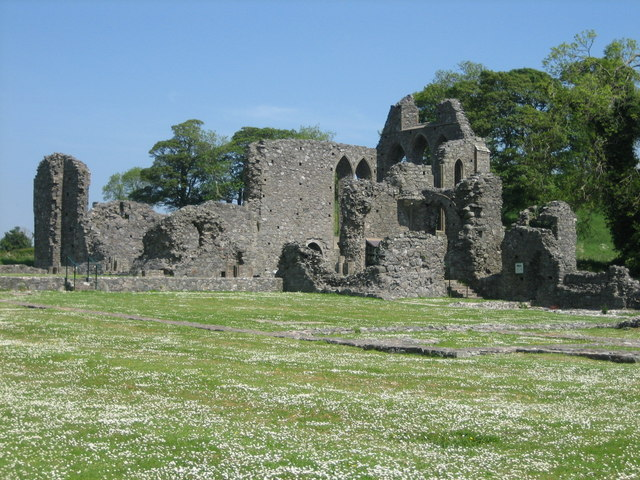
Inch Abbey

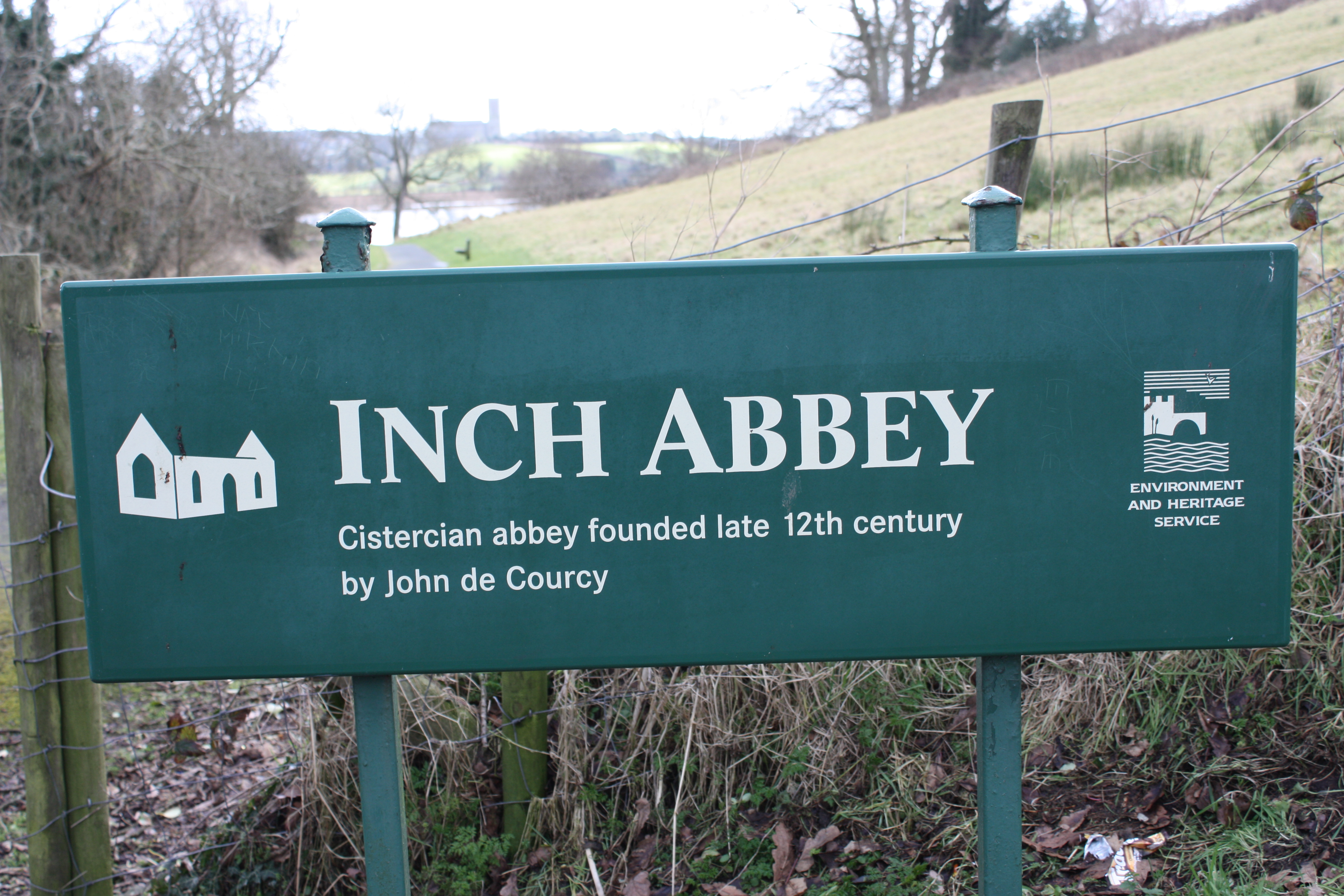
Signage at the abbey site

Inch Abbey is a ruined Cistercian monastery on the outskirts of Downpatrick, County Down, Northern Ireland. It was founded by John de Courcy in the 12th-century. It was dissolved in 1541.

== History ==
By the year 800 a monastery existed at this location called Inis Cumhscraighn and was situated on the River Quoile. In 1002, the monastery was sacked by Vikings led by Sitric, King of the Danes. It was also plundered by the Irish in 1149 and the site had become defunct by 1150.

The present day Cistercian ruins were founded by Anglo-Norman John de Courcy and his wife Affreca in the 12th-century as penance for his destruction of Erenagh Abbey in c.1177. de Courcy populated the newly built abbey with monks from Furness Abbey and commissioned one of them, Jocelyn of Barrow-in-Furness, to write about the legends of Saint Patrick. The abbey had a strong English influence beginning with the arrival of the monks from Furness. The monks refused to allow any Irish men into the abbey and were later accused of hunting the Irish with spears in 1318.

Inch Abbey was dissolved in 1541, and the site was granted to Gerald, Earl of Kildare.

It is served by Inch Abbey railway station, which is operated by the Downpatrick and County Down Railway.

== Architecture ==
It was constructed in a cruciform shape, which was standard for Cistercian buildings. The abbey contains an un-aisled chauncel with triple pointed lancet windows to the east, an aisled nave to the west and two projecting transepts to the north and south of the building.

One 12th-century romanesque style carved stone survives at the site.
