= Inch Abbey railway station =

Heritage railway station in County Down, Northern Ireland

Inch Abbey
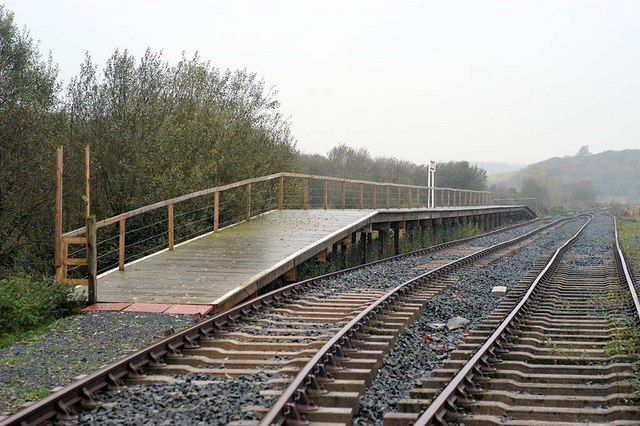

General information
- Location: Downpatrick, County Down; Northern Ireland
- Coordinates: 54.3377°N 5.7358°W
- Owner: Downpatrick and County Down Railway
- Operator: Downpatrick and County Down Railway
- Line: North Line
- Platforms: 2

Key dates
- 2005: Opened
Route map
Location

Inch Abbey railway station (often shortened to just Inch) is a station on the Downpatrick and County Down Railway, a heritage railway in Northern Ireland. It is the terminus of the railway's North Line and serves Inch Abbey, a ruined monastery and local tourist attraction of Downpatrick notable for its use as a filming location in the HBO show Game of Thrones.

The station is a simple island platform layout with a timber deck. The north platform face is on a through track, allowing locomotives to access a headshunt and run-around loop, whilst the south face is a bay platform slightly shorter than the through platform. When the station is open passengers purchase tickets and wait for their train in a parked-up railway carriage. The station has a small car park, picnic area, and toilet facilities.

Most of the DCDR's trains run to here from Downpatrick railway station, such as the Easter, St. Patrick's Day and Summer steam trains. On these days, the buffet train is parked in the bay platform and passenger trains use the through platform.

== History ==
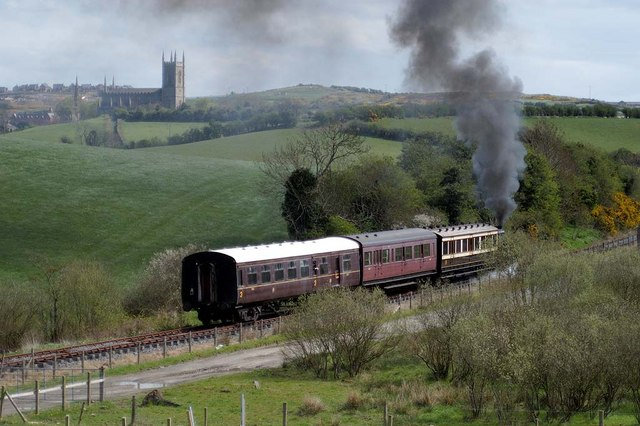
A DCDR steam train departing from Inch Abbey on its way back to Downpatrick. Down Cathedral can be seen in the background.

The Belfast and County Down Railway (BCDR) opened their mainline from Belfast Queen's Quay to Downpatrick in March 1859, operating for almost a century before the line was closed by the Ulster Transport Authority in 1950. The line passed approximately 600 metres from Inch Abbey, a Cistercian monastery built in 1100 by John de Courcy, but it was never served directly by a railway halt - the BCDR advertised it instead as a tourism destination reachable from Downpatrick station itself.

In 1983, Down District Council agreed to support the Downpatrick & Ardglass Railway (since renamed the Downpatrick & County Down Railway) in its efforts to rebuild part of the BCDR lines in and around Downpatrick for use as a heritage railway, starting with the South Line to the Loop Platform and Magnus Grave before moving on the North Line to a brand new halt at Inch Abbey. The restored line follows the original BCDR route out of Downpatrick until shortly after it crosses the River Quoile, where it makes a sharp turn to the north-east to terminate closer to the Abbey itself. Work on the extension commenced in 1997, with Inch Abbey opening in 2005.

In 2021 the line to Inch Abbey was used for the filming of Derry Girls Season 3 Episode 3, Strangers on a Train.

== Services ==
| Preceding station | Heritage railways | Following station |
|---|---|---|
| Terminus | Downpatrick and County Down Railway; North Line | Downpatrick |
| Terminus | Downpatrick and County Down Railway; Loop Line | Downpatrick Loop Platform |
