= Agatha and the Curse of Ishtar =

British TV drama film

- Poster
- Written by: Tom Dalton
- Directed by: Sam Yates
- Starring: Lyndsey Marshal; Jonah Hauer-King; Stanley Townsend; Jack Deam; Katherine Kingsley
- Music by: Oliver Coates
- Country of origin: United Kingdom
- Original language: English

Production
- Producers: Tom Dalton; Carol Harding
- Cinematography: Catherine Goldschmidt
- Editor: Anna Dick
- Running time: 95 minutes
- Production companies: Darlow Smithson Productions; Factual Fiction

Original release
- Network: Channel 5
- Release: 15 December 2019

Agatha and the Curse of Ishtar is a 2019 British alternative history television drama film about crime writer Agatha Christie becoming embroiled in a real-life murder case during a trip to an archaeological dig in Iraq following her divorce. The film premiered on Channel 5 in the United Kingdom on 15 December 2019. Filming took place in Malta and was directed by Sam Yates. Agatha and the Curse of Ishtar premiered in the United States on PBS on 18 May 2021.

== Plot ==
In 1928, two years after her divorce and her 11-day disappearance, Agatha Christie travels to Baghdad, Iraq seeking culture and peace. Instead she is caught in a web of murder, intrigue and love. Agatha is unwillingly drawn into the investigation of the murder of an attractive young archaeologist and must unravel a series of mysterious murders.

== Cast ==
- Lyndsey Marshal as Agatha Christie
- Jonah Hauer-King as Max Mallowan
- Stanley Townsend as Sir Constance Bernard
- Jack Deam as Leonard Woolley
- Katherine Kingsley as Katharine Woolley
- Waj Ali as Ezekiel
- Rory Fleck Byrne as Marmaduke
- Bronagh Waugh as Lucy Bernard
- Crystal Clarke as Pearl Theroux
- Liran Nathan as Faisal
- Walles Hamonde as Ahkam
- Waleed Elgadi as Doctor El-Memar
- Daniel Gosling as Hugo

== Production ==
The film was created by husband and wife team Tom and Emily Dalton who also created Agatha and the Truth of Murder which was Channel 5's most watched festive programme of 2018. This was shot in Malta, back-to-back with Agatha and the Midnight Murders.

== Reception ==
Described as "quite a treat" by Michael Hogan in The Daily Telegraph, The Times wrote that "what it lacked in unexpected twists and depth it made up for in nostalgic comfort-blanketry and good, clean murder".
