= Downpatrick and County Down Railway =

Heritage railway and museum in Downpatrick, Northern Ireland

Coordinates: 54.325629°N 5.722189°W

- The DCDR logo, based on a monogram design used by the BCDR
- Locale: Northern Ireland

Commercial operations
- Name: Belfast and County Down Railway
- Built by: Belfast and County Down Railway
- Original gauge: 1,600 mm (5 ft 3 in)

Preserved operations
- Operated by: The Downpatrick and County Down Railway Society Limited
- Stations: 4
- Length: Approximately 3 miles (4.8 km)
- Preserved gauge: 1,600 mm (5 ft 3 in)

Commercial history
- Opened: 1859
- Closed: 1950

Preservation history
- Jan 1985: Work started on building preserved railway
- Dec 1987: First public trains ran
- Apr 1995: South Line extended to Magnus' Grave
- Sep 2005: North Line extended to Inch Abbey
- Sep 2014: Carriage Gallery officially opened
- Mar 2020: Railway closes during COVID-19 pandemic
- Jul 2022: Railway reopens to public
- Oct 2023: Railway Temporarily Closes due to severe flooding and resulting damage
- Oct 2024: Railway reopens following flood damage

Website
- downrail.co.uk

The Downpatrick and County Down Railway (DCDR) is a 5 foot, 3 inch (1,600 mm) gauge heritage railway in County Down, Northern Ireland. It is operated by volunteers and runs passenger trains using steam and diesel locomotives, diesel railcars, and vintage carriages. The railway has approximately three miles (4.8 km) of track in a triangular-shaped layout, which connects the town of Downpatrick with the historical sites of Inch Abbey to the north and King Magnus’ Grave to the south. It also houses a museum of railway artefacts and rolling stock originating from both Northern Ireland and the Republic of Ireland, dating from the 1860s to the 1980s.

The DCDR's development was spearheaded by a group of local railway enthusiasts in the early 1980s, and work started on building the railway in 1985. Most of its track is on part of the now-closed Belfast and County Down Railway (BCDR) mainline which ran between Belfast, Downpatrick, and Newcastle. The heritage railway first opened to the public in December 1987, and originally consisted of little more than a short stretch of track with an E-class diesel locomotive and a brake van. It has expanded incrementally since then, and reached its current length with the completion of the Inch Abbey line in 2005.

The DCDR is the only five-foot, three-inch gauge heritage railway in Ireland, which has been the standard gauge on the island since the 1840s. With its Downpatrick terminus located at the foot of Down Cathedral and next to the Saint Patrick Centre, the railway has become a major tourist attraction for the town and has accumulated several hundred members. It currently has three steam and eight diesel locomotives, five of which are on loan from the Irish Traction Group, as well as the largest collection of Victorian railway carriages in Ireland. Some of these have been overhauled by the railway's volunteers from a dilapidated state, and have received awards for their restoration.

== History ==
=== Belfast and County Down Railway ===
The first railway in Downpatrick was opened to the public in March 1859, with the completion of the Belfast and County Down Railway mainline from Belfast Queen's Quay. Downpatrick's railway facilities included a substantial station building on Market Street, a two-road train shed, a goods store, an engine shed, and a turntable. The line was constructed under the management of the BCDR's chief engineer Sir John Macneill, and included a bridge over the marshy estuary of the River Quoile, just outside Downpatrick. The original bridge consisted of lattice trusses supported by timber piles driven into the riverbed, and was replaced with a steel girder bridge in 1929. As it was built on the floodplain of the River Quoile, the line towards Downpatrick often suffered from flooding, particularly during the winter months.

The railway originally terminated at Downpatrick, but in 1869 a separate company, the Downpatrick, Dundrum and Newcastle Railway, built an extension from Downpatrick to the seaside town of Newcastle. The Newcastle line was operated by the BCDR and purchased by them in 1881. The extension created an inconvenience wherein a train running between Belfast and Newcastle had to stop in Downpatrick and uncouple its locomotive, which moved via a run-round loop to the other end of the train in order to continue its journey. This significantly increased journey times and caused excessive congestion at the Downpatrick terminus.

The opportunity arose in 1892 to end this cumbersome practice with the opening of the Downpatrick, Killough and Ardglass Railway and, with it, Downpatrick Loop Platform. The Ardglass line was built and operated by the BCDR, and branched off from their mainline about a kilometre south of Downpatrick station. In conjunction with this, a loop line was constructed to directly link the Newcastle and Belfast lines, with the Loop Platform located at the South Junction. This enabled Newcastle-bound trains from Belfast (and vice versa) to bypass the main Downpatrick station, and instead call at the Loop Platform where passengers intending for Downpatrick or Ardglass could board a local train. Meanwhile, the mainline train could carry on without having to run around. This resulted in an unusual triangular-shaped layout, the trackbed of which forms the basis of most of the DCDR's operational railway line.

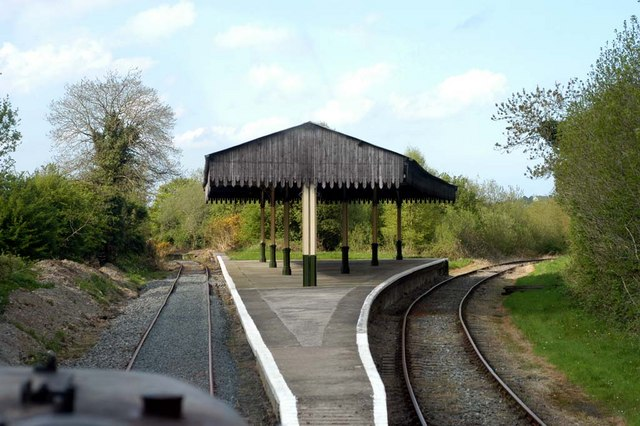
The original Loop Platform viewed from the South Junction. The line to the left originally led to Belfast, while the line to the right leads to Downpatrick

=== Decline and closure of the Belfast – Newcastle Line ===
Following the 1945 Ballymacarrett rail crash and the resultant £80,000 (the equivalent of over £3,530,000 in 2020) it had to pay in compensation, the BCDR was financially ruined. This was a deciding factor in the nationalisation of the company, which became part of the Ulster Transport Authority (UTA) in 1948. The UTA's railways were in need of significant investment following years of underfunding during World War II; as a result, Northern Ireland's devolved government established a tribunal to determine the future of its public transport system. In December 1949 the tribunal authorised the closure of all ex-BCDR lines except the Bangor branch, as part of an effort to avoid excess expenditure on railway maintenance and to divert assets towards improving the UTA's road services.

The entire Belfast – Newcastle line south of Comber, including Downpatrick, was closed on Sunday 15 January 1950. The track and almost all of the railway infrastructure was removed in 1953, and the station was used by the UTA's bus division, which became Ulsterbus in 1968. Most of the trackbed along the line was sold by the UTA to private individuals who owned adjoining land: the trackbed in the Downpatrick area was sold to Charles Mulholland, 3rd Baron Dunleath, and was left largely undisturbed until the arrival of the DCDR. Although the 1929-built Quoile Bridge was dismantled for scrap, the Loop Platform and several smaller nearby bridges were left intact. The station building was demolished shortly after Ulsterbus moved to a new depot in the town in 1975, and part of the former station yard was used as a storage depot by the Department of the Environment's Road Service.

=== Heritage Railway ===
Local architect Gerry Cochrane M.B.E. was inspired to start the scheme after taking a walk along the route of the line, and by 1982 had gained support to rebuild part of the line as a heritage steam railway from the local council. Lord Dunleath, whose father had purchased the railway trackbed adjacent to his estate after the closure of the BCDR in Downpatrick, gave the newly formed society a package of land on which to build the line and station for a peppercorn rent. This was on the approaches to the old Downpatrick station, which had been demolished in the 1970s. Work started on rebuilding the railway in 1985, with public trains finally running in the town again in Friday 4 December 1987, making it the first Irish gauge heritage railway in Ireland to carry passengers over its own track. Track has been relaid on nearly 6 km (4 mi) of Belfast and County Down Railway trackbed, and a 1.6 km (1 mi) extension south to the hamlet of Ballydugan is planned.

The railway began life as the Downpatrick & Ardglass Railway, as the original intention was to extend the railway to this fishing port on the south coast of County Down. This name was dropped in 1996 following the abandonment of this proposal and the railway was renamed the Downpatrick Railway Museum until 2005 when the new name, Downpatrick & County Down Railway was adopted following the opening of the Inch Abbey extension.

Between March 2020 and July 2022 (apart from a temporary resumption of service during Christmas 2021) the railway was closed to the public due to the COVID-19 pandemic. Volunteers continued work throughout the closure period, and normal service resumed on 16 July 2022

The railway was once again closed to the public in November 2023, after excessive rainfall during Storm Ciarán submerged the entire site under 3 - 6ft of floodwater for nearly a week. The railway was closed for almost a full year whilst volunteers assessed and repaired the damage caused by the flood to rolling stock and infrastructure, finally reopening on October 26 2024.

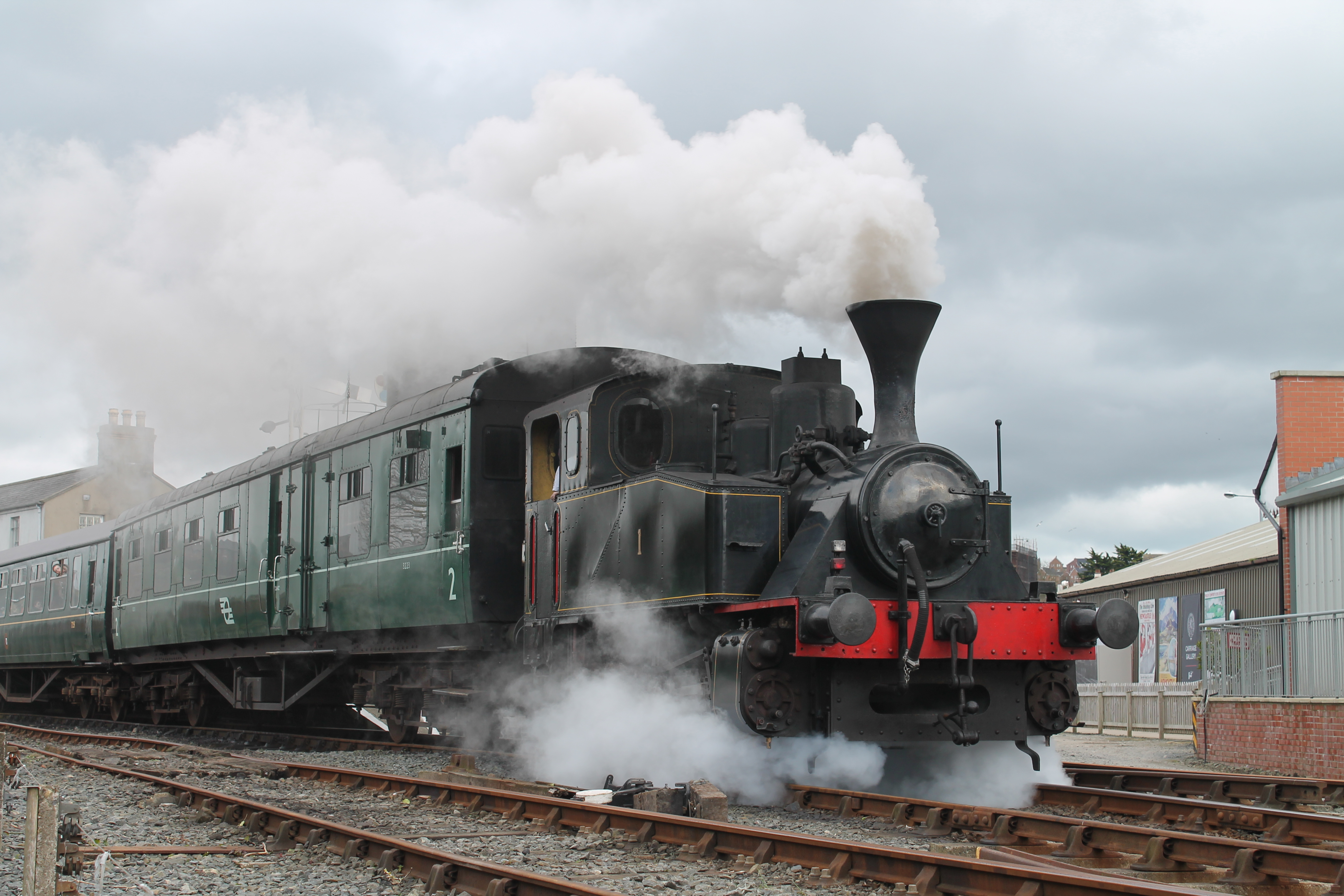
O&K No. 1 at Downpatrick

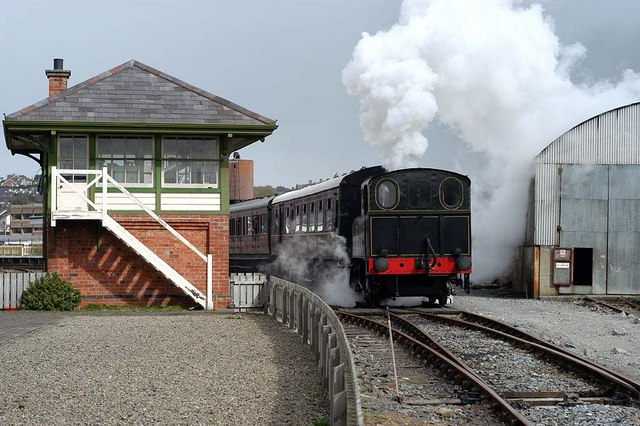
O&K No. 3 Pulls a train out of Downpatrick in 2006

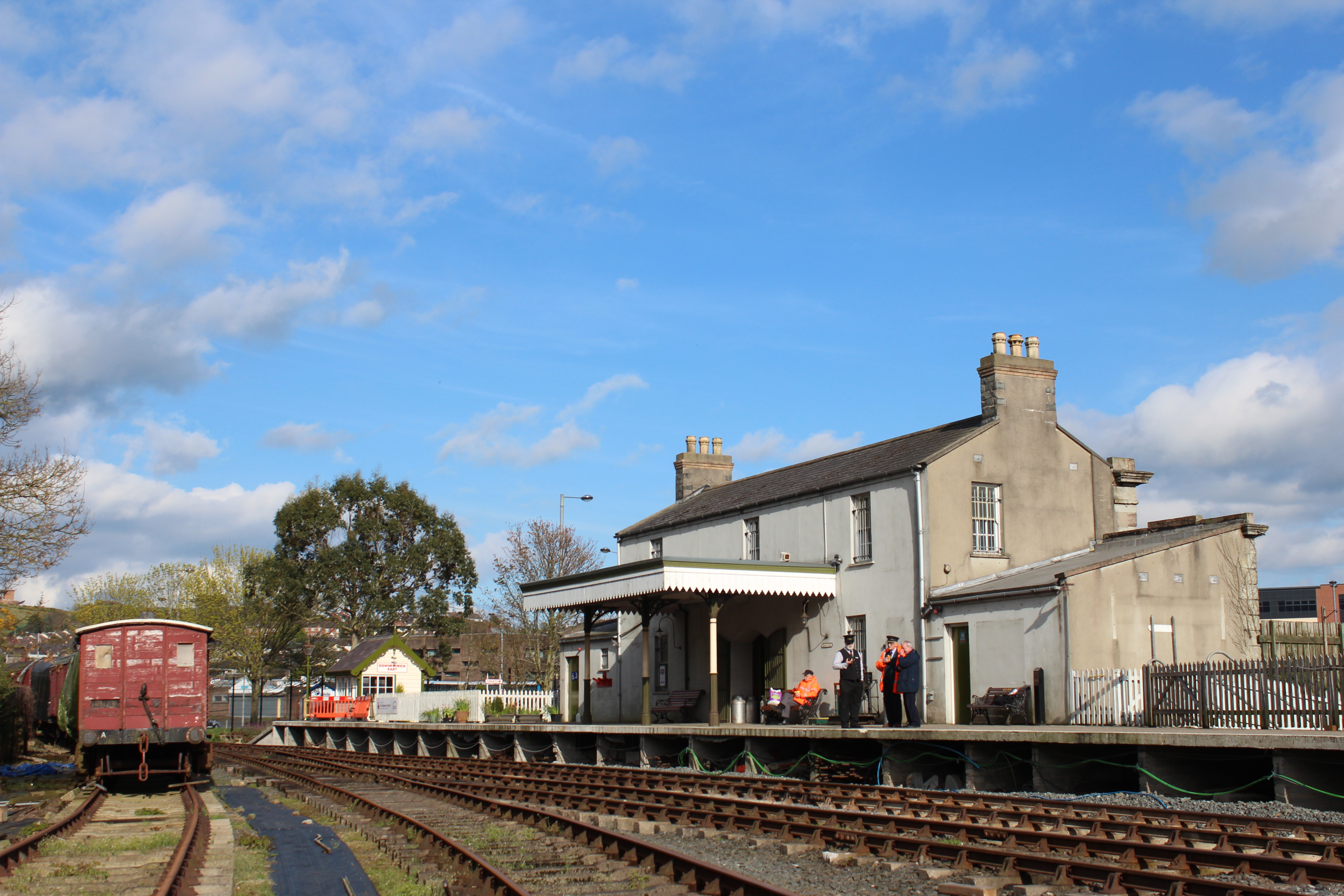
Downpatrick station building

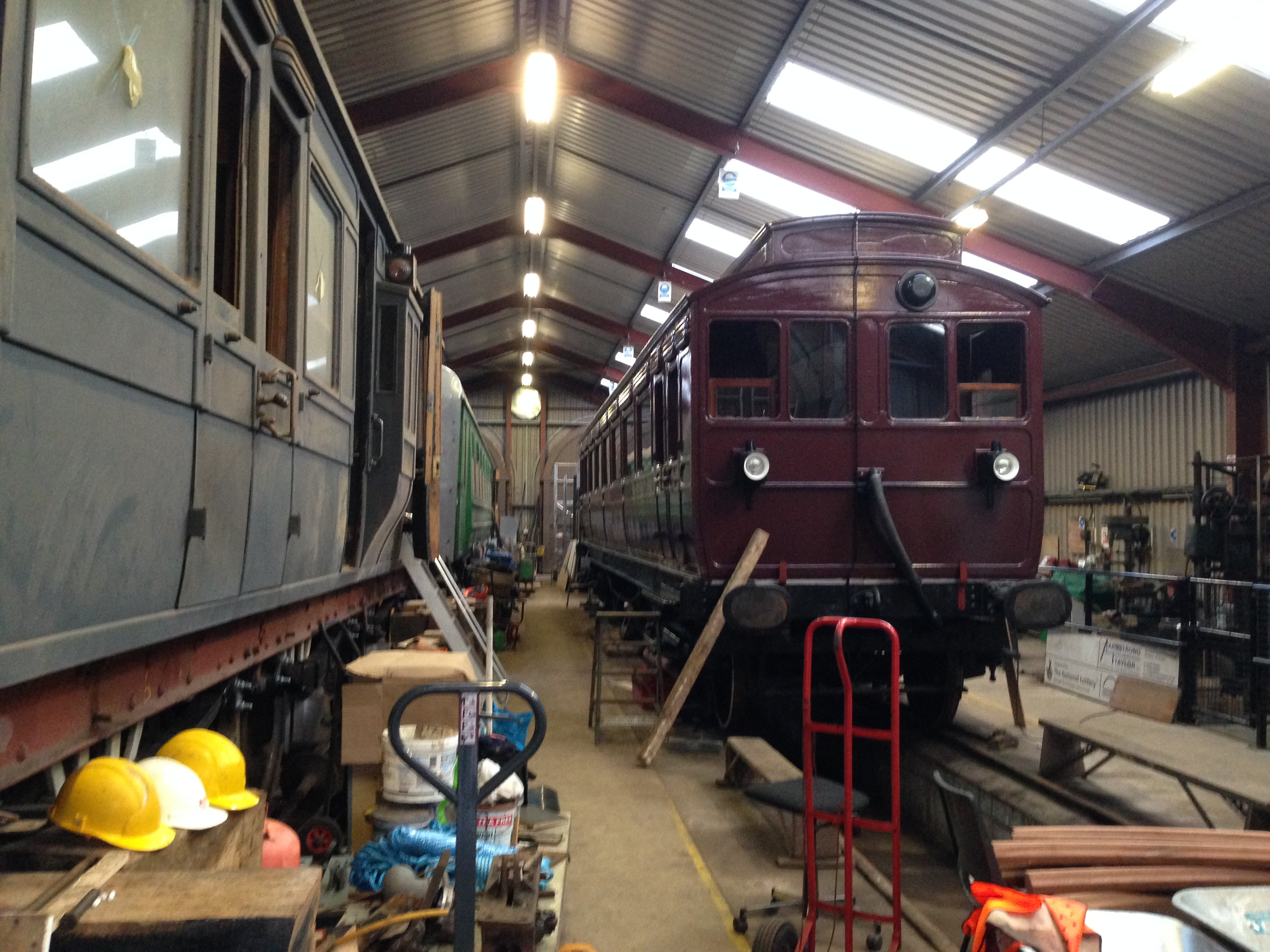
The BCDR Railmotor undergoing restoration in 2014.

== Operations ==
Approximately three miles (4.8 km) of 1,600 mm (5 ft 3 in) Irish standard gauge track are open as of 2019, along which a steam locomotive, currently either O&K No. 1 or 3, and 1950s-60s era diesel locomotives are run, drawing preserved rolling stock. Passenger trains are usually operated with brake/generator standard class coach 3223, which was built in 1954 by Córas Iompair Éierann, brake/standard class coach 728, which was built in 1951 by the Ulster Transport Authority, and Park Royal brake/standard class coach 1944, also built in 1954 by Córas Iompair Éierann. Stock is added to or withdrawn from the 'running set' as maintenance allows. Older carriages built by the Great Southern and Western Railway and Belfast and County Down Railway were operated on the line, but as 1950s/1960s stock became available the DCDR moved these vintage carriages inside for overhaul and display. These vintage coaches are now used on a select few special running days, such as European Heritage Open Days and for private contracts, as they are too historically important for everyday wear and tear.

The railway also aims to have an at least partially operational mechanical signalling system, using the preserved King's Bog and Bundoran Junction signal cabins along with multiple semaphores that are on the site. Related to this is the Double Track Project, which will allow simultaneous operation on the North and South lines.

Every year, the DCDR operates the following trains:

- Saint Patrick's Day Specials, which are held on Saint Patrick's Day and operate to Inch Abbey.
- Easter Specials, which take place over a couple of days around the Easter Period, and operate to Inch Abbey.
- May Day Specials, which take place on May Day and operate to Inch Abbey.
- Summer Specials, which take place every weekend during summer and operate to Inch Abbey. Some of these days involve special events, as well as an annual diesel day.
- EHOD Days, which run in conjunction with the last Summer Specials weekend. These offer visitors free cab rides in a diesel as well as behind-the-scenes tours.
- Halloween Specials, which take place on the weekend prior to, and on, Halloween night, and operate to Magnus' Grave.
- Santa Specials, which take place on the weekend prior to Christmas, and operate to the Loop Platform.
- Mince Pie Specials, which take place on either the last or last weekend of the year, and operate to Magnus' Grave or Inch Abbey - these are usually diesel-hauled.

Bank Holidays, shunts, private charters and film contracts make for extra trains throughout the year too.

On operating days, visitors have access to the BCDR Museum which is housed upstairs in Downpatrick railway station, the Downpatrick East signal cabin, a model railway room, the workshop viewing area (Where carriages can be seen undergoing restoration) and the Carriage Gallery.

A gift shop and buffet carriage, the latter of which will be parked at Inch Abbey or Downpatrick Loop Platform railway station, are open on operating days.

== Stations & Buildings ==
=== Stations ===
- Downpatrick Station is the principal station on the DCDR network, where all passenger trains originate from. It has two platforms, though one of these is currently out of use. The original BCDR station was sited on Market Street, but was demolished and replaced by a supermarket before the DCDR was established.
- Downpatrick Loop Platform has no road access, which helped it to escape demolition in the 1950s. It serves as the interchange point between the DCDR's South and Loop lines. Downpatrick Loop has two platforms.
- King Magnus' Halt is the current terminus of the South Line. It has one platform and serves the grave of Viking King Magnus Barefoot, a site previously inaccessible before the arrival of the railway. Magnus Halt was not an original BCDR station, though it is located at the site of the BCDR's Ardglass Junction.
- Inch Abbey Halt is the current terminus of the North Line. It has two platforms and serves the ruins of Inch Abbey. The station was not part of the BCDR, as it is located on a short deviation away from the original trackbed.

=== Buildings & Structures ===
Several of the railway's buildings, including its engine shed and two signal cabins, are original railway structures that were first erected in different parts Northern Ireland and later rebuilt brick-by-brick at Downpatrick.

- Downpatrick Station Building was originally the town's Gas Manager's House, sited across the road from the DCDR and moved over brick-by-brick.
- Downpatrick Signal Cabin, a BNCR structure, was moved brick-by-brick from Kingsbog Junction on the Belfast–Derry line.
- Downpatrick East Signal Cabin, a GNR structure, was originally Bundoran Junction's North Cabin. It was moved to DCDR in 2011 and opened to the public in 2017.
- Downpatrick Locomotive Shed, a BNCR structure, was moved stone-by-stone from Maghera where it was originally the goods shed.
- Downpatrick Station Canopy was originally attached to the Maghera Shed.
- Downpatrick Water Tower was moved from Antrim station.
- The Arch, which spans the main gate, bears the name of the railway and is based on an original design at Cookstown.
- Bridges 163 & 164 are original BCDR bridges, and carry the Back and South lines respectively across a narrow stream.
- Downpatrick Loop Platform and Canopy are the only BCDR buildings left in Downpatrick.
- The Cutting is just beyond the limit of passenger operations on the South Line. It carries trains up a slight gradient, with vertical retaining walls on either side.
- The Quoile Bridge is the longest bridge on the DCDR. It carries the North Line over the River Quoile, and though the spans are newly fabricated, the concrete centre pier is original.

=== Carriage Gallery ===
Completed in 2012, the Carriage Gallery is the DCDR's museum with rolling stock that is not being used to run public trains during their visit. Like the Ulster Folk and Transport Museum, the Carriage Gallery houses vehicles in an indoors environment where the public can get up close and learn about both the vehicles in question, and Irish railways in general. Despite its name, the Carriage Gallery also contains locomotives, both steam and diesel, and even a road-going tar boiler. Designed in homage to the Victorian railway termini with their grand overall roofs, the Gallery collection is arranged across 3 roads with 4 platform faces, allowing visitors the chance to enter the vehicles. The condition of the exhibits ranges from fully restored to as-discovered so that visitors can appreciate the huge work required, with some carriages still in the hen-house state they were found in on farms across the country.

The Carriage Gallery was officially opened by the Earl Of Wessex in 2014.

== Rolling Stock ==
=== Overview ===
The railway hosts three steam locomotives, twelve diesel locomotives, seven diesel railcar sets, twenty-four carriages, thirty-nine wagons and four permanent way vehicles, making for a total of eighty-five railway vehicles. If the railcar constituent coaches are considered as individual carriages, the total is ninety-two vehicles.

==== Engines ====
At present O&K Nos. 1 and 3 are the operational steam locomotives. 1875-built 0-6-0 tank engine, GSWR No.90, delivered to Downpatrick on Sunday 30 September 2007, is Ireland's oldest steam engine capable of operation. Two E Class diesels, Nos. E421 and E432, were acquired in 1986, with E421 working the Society's first passenger trains. However, the E Class could not start from cold and thus three G Class diesels arrived at the railway to facilitate shunting and works trains - one was purchased privately by a volunteer from Westrail, and two are on long-term loan from the Irish Traction Group (ITG). The ITG also loans seven mainline diesels to the railway: CIÉ A class Nos. A3_{R} (arrived 27 July 2025) and A39_{R} (22 November 2009), 141 class Nos. 146 (27 November 2010) and 152 (8 June 2025), 201 Class No. C231 (7 June 2014), 121 class No. 124 (1 June 2025), and 181 class No. 190 (1 June 2025).

==== Railcars ====
Sligo, Leitrim and Northern Counties Railway Railcar B, built in 1947, was donated to the railway by Iarnród Éireann in 2006. This railcar arrived in poor condition and it will be some time before the DCDR can return it to operational condition. Prototype BR-Leyland railbus, RB3, which was modified in the early 1980s to run on Irish metals and was used for a period by Northern Ireland Railways, was acquired by DCDR in 2001, with the hope of using it to run midweek trains as it did not require as large a crew as locomotive-hauled trains. However, due to several faults inherent with the prototype Railbus' design, this did not come to fruition. RB3 left DCDR on 8 June 2025, having been acquired by the Gwendraeth Valley Railway in Wales. Three more ex-NIR railcars are owned by DCDR, comprising the last 450 Class, 458 Antrim Castle, which arrived in 2014 and has been converted to a buffet train, and two 80 class railcars which arrived in 2018.

==== Carriages ====
There are four main 'carriage rakes'. These are:

- Old Buffet: Conventional 1950s carriages formerly used as the buffet train and Santa's Grotto during the Autumn and Winter months. Shown in pink on the tables below.
- New Buffet: A 450 Class railcar and DBSO used as the buffet train during the Spring and Summer months. Shown in blue on the tables below.
- Everyday Running Set: 1950s carriages used during most running days. Shown in green on the tables below.
- Vintage Running Set: Antique carriages (Edwardian period or earlier) normally on display in the Carriage Gallery, but brought into service for special events. Shown in brown on the table below.

The everyday running set currently consists of CIÉ 1944 and UTA 728, with generator van CIÉ 3223 being added for Autumn/Winter operations to provide heat and light. On special days, the Vintage Set is used, consisting of BCDR Nos. 72 and 148, and GSWR 836. 836 is also sometimes added to the everyday running set on very busy days, creating a high-capacity rake along with 1944 and 728 capable of seating over 200 people. The buffet set is publicly accessible on running days when it is parked in a platform (the New Buffet at Inch Abbey during Spring and Summer, and the Old Buffet at the Loop Platform in Autumn and Winter).

The remainder of the carriage fleet is considerably varied, with a mix of six- and four-wheeled and bogie carriages, and representatives from virtually every time period and Irish gauge railway company - including the BCDR (The DCDR owns 5 of the 6 extant BCDR carriages), GNR, GSWR, GSR, UTA, NIR, CIÉ, and most significantly, the Ulster Railway, which is represented by No. 33, the sole surviving UR vehicle and Ulster's oldest carriage. Other notable carriages are BCDR Railmotor No. 72 and Royal Saloon No. 153, both of Ireland's extant Travelling Post Offices and the last AEC railcar. Two carriages, GSWR No.'s 1097 and 1287, arrived at the railway in the mid-2000s on loan from RPSI, though ownership was later transferred to DCDR.

==== Wagons ====
The DCDR also has a large selection of wagons, goods vans and underframes. Ex-NCC brake van No. 33 was the railway's first passenger-carrying vehicle. Included in the railway's wagon fleet is the most powerful steam crane in Ireland, NCC No. 3084. As the wagons do not contribute to bringing in revenue like engines and carriages, most are in storage except for a small few in use by the railway's Permanent Way or Locomotive Departments. In time, DCDR hopes to construct a dedicated goods shed in order to finally give its wagons a permanent home. In August 2022, a complete ballast train composed of three hoppers and a plough van were delivered to the railway from North Wall, Dublin across two days, supported by Iarnród Éireann. In late 2025 and Summer 2026, the railway took delivery of several CIÉ-era freight wagons provided by a private donor, consisting of the last 'cement bubble' and pallet van, as well as two container flats.

A small fleet of permanent way vehicles, all acquired from NIR, and some road/rail on-track plant are used by the railway's Permanent Way department.

=== Stock Lists ===
==== Steam Locomotives ====
Number	Wheel Arrangement	Build Date	Original Operator	Arrived At DCDR	Current Status	Photo	Notes
1	0-4-0T+WT	1934	Cómhlucht Siúicre Éireann	1987	Boiler ticket expired, awaiting overhaul		Worked first trains in preservation in 2013.
3	0-4-0T+WT	1935	Cómhlucht Siúicre Éireann	1987	Stored		In service from 2000 to 2010, overhauled before resuming service in 2018.
90	0-6-0T	1875	Castleisland Railway/GSWR	2007	Undergoing overhaul		Originally built as a railmotor.

==== Diesel Locomotives & Railcars ====
Key:	No designated rake	Old Buffet	New Buffet	Everyday Running Set	Vintage Running Set

Number		Class	Build Date	Original Operator	Arrived At DCDR	Current Status	Photo	Notes	
E421		E421 Class	1962	CIÉ	1986	On display in Carriage Gallery, awaiting overhaul		Named W.F. Gillispie OBE.	
E432		E421 Class	1963	CIÉ	1986	Stored		Out of traffic.	
G611		G611 Class	1961	CIÉ	1996	Stored		Owned by the Irish Traction Group.	
G613		G611 Class	1961	CIÉ	1986	Stored		Privately Owned.	
G617		G611 Class	1962	CIÉ	1996	Operational		Owned by the Irish Traction Group.	
A39_{R}		A (001) Class	1955	CIÉ	2009	Under restoration		Owned by the Irish Traction Group.	
A3_{R}		A (001) Class	1955	CIÉ	2025	Stored		Owned by the Irish Traction Group.	
124		B (121) Class	1960	CIÉ	2025	Operational		Owned by the Irish Traction Group	
146		B (141) Class	1962	CIÉ	2010	Operational		Owned by the Irish Traction Group	
152		B (141) Class	1962	CIÉ	2025	Stored		Owned by the Irish Traction Group.	
190		B (181) Class	1966	CIÉ	2025	Undergoing overhaul		Owned by the Irish Traction Group	
C231		C (201) Class	1956	CIÉ	2014	Stored		Owned by the Irish Traction Group.	
458	458	450 Class	1987	NIR	2014	Operational		3-car set named Antrim Castle.	Power car
458	798	450 Class	1987	NIR	2014	Operational		3-car set named Antrim Castle.	Intermediate
458	788	450 Class	1987	NIR	2014	Operational		3-car set named Antrim Castle.	Driving trailer
69		80 Class	1978	NIR	2018	Undergoing internal restoration		2-car set.	Power Car
749		80 Class	1978	NIR	2018	Operational, but not yet in service		2-car set.	Driving Trailer
90		80 Class	1978	NIR	2018	Stored, but mechanically operational		2-car set.	Power Car
752		80 Class	1979	NIR	2018	Stored, but mechanically operational		2-car set.	Driving Trailer
6111		2600 Class	1962	CIÉ	2015	Awaiting overhaul		Former AEC railcar 2624, converted to push-pull driving trailer in 1974.	
Railcar B		-	1947	SLNCR	2006	Awaiting overhaul		Last passenger-carrying SLNCR vehicle.	
712		-	1962	CIÉ	1998	Stored		ITG-Owned Wickham Railcar.	
713		-	1962	CIÉ	1999	Operational		Wickham Railcar, Nicknamed Rosie. Overhaul finished in January 2023, awaiting trials	

==== Carriages ====
Key:	No designated rake	Old Buffet	New Buffet	Everyday running set	Vintage running set

Number	Type	Original Operator	Arrived At DCDR	Current Status	Photo	Notes
39	Six-Wheeler	BCDR	1987	In Carriage Gallery, awaiting overhaul		Third Brake. Sitting temporarily on a GSWR six-wheeled underframe.
72	Bogie	BCDR	1985	On display in Carriage Gallery, operational		Originally a railmotor; later converted to autocoach. Ran successfully in railmotor mode with No. 1 in April 2016.
148/152	Bogie	BCDR	1987	On display in Carriage Gallery, operational		Incorporates half of 148 and half of sister coach 152. Wheelchair accessible. Sits on GSWR no. 1110's underframe.
153	Bogie	BCDR	1987	In Carriage Gallery, awaiting overhaul		Royal Saloon, carried at least 3 British Monarchs. Sitting temporarily on GNR parcels van no. 619's underframe. Acquired in 1984 and stored at RAF Bishopscourt until 1987.
154	Six-Wheeler	BCDR	1984	In Carriage Gallery, awaiting overhaul		Second class half-back. Sitting temporarily on WLWR no. 935's underframe
638a	Four-wheeler	CIÉ	2019	Undergoing overhaul		Arrived at DCDR 05/03/2019.
1918	Bogie	CIÉ	1988	Stored		Laminate Brake.
1944	Bogie	CIÉ	1995	Operational		Park Royal. Returned to traffic 24/11/2018 after a 20-year overhaul.
2419	Bogie	CIÉ	1988	Stored		Laminate Buffet.
2977	Bogie	CIÉ	2017	On display in Carriage Gallery		Travelling Post Office. Owned by An Post.
3223	Bogie	CIÉ	1988	Stored		Laminate Standard Brake and Generator. Only used in Autumn and Winter. Equipped with propelling cab.
Unknown	Six-Wheeler	GNR	1993	Awaiting overhaul		Third class 17x series, exact number not yet known. Involved in Armagh rail disaster. Transferred to BCDR in 1922. Sits on MGWR no. 13M's underframe.
33	Unknown	Ulster Railway	1986	In Carriage Gallery, undergoing overhaul		Only surviving stock from UR; on temporary underframe. Third oldest carriage in Ireland (built 1862). Sitting temporarily on a former GSWR horsebox underframe.
25	Six-Wheeler	MGWR	2006	In Carriage Gallery, awaiting overhaul		-
53	Six-Wheeler	MGWR	2006	In Workshop, awaiting overhaul		-
69	Six-Wheeler	GSWR	1992	In Workshop, undergoing overhaul		Converted from Full Brake to Brake First Saloon. Privately Owned.
836	Bogie	GSWR	1986	On display in Carriage Gallery, operational		-
1097	Bogie	GSWR	2005	Awaiting overhaul		Originally on loan from RPSI, ownership later transferred.
1287	Bogie	GSWR	2004	In use as a 'Tarry' (mess van)		Originally on loan from RPSI, ownership later transferred.
728	Bogie	UTA	1991	Operational		Ex-MPD driving trailer; later 70 Class Intermediate.
8918	Bogie	NIR	2014	Operational		Ex-NIR DBSO 9712, later came to NIR but was never used in service. Used as translator wagon between 458 and 124 or 146 for buffet train.

==== Wagons ====
Number	Type	Original Operator	Arrived At DCDR	Current Status	Photo	Notes
1536	Tanker	Private Owner	1999	Stored		-
25199	Cement Tanker	CIÉ	2025	Stored		Last surviving example of a "bubble wagon".
18885	Goods Van	CIÉ		Stored		Contained Generator - known as Roaring Meg. Formerly used to store Halloween props.
26405	Goods Van	CIÉ	2026	Stored		Last remaining CIÉ pallet van.
27350	Container Flat	CIÉ	2026	Stored		
27427	Container Flat	CIÉ	2026	Stored		
27756	Container Flat	CIÉ	2017	In use		Carries a spare English Electric 4SRKT engine.
24122	Ballast Hopper	CIÉ	2022	In use		Built 1972.
24145	Ballast Hopper	CIÉ	2022	in use		Built 1972.
26633	Ballast Hopper	CIÉ	2022	In use		Built 1969 as a dolomite ore wagon, later converted for ballast use.
24852	Plough/Brake Van	CIÉ	2022	In use		Built 1978.
8452	Plough/Brake Van	GSWR	1990	Stored		Formerly used to store Halloween props and as crew transport to Magnus Grave at Halloween.
8411	Ballast Hopper	GSWR	1986	Stored		-
Unknown	Goods Van	BCDR	2013	Stored		Body only. Sitting temporarily on wagon underframe C604.
C505	Flat	NCC		In use		Used for Permanent Way trains.
713	Flat	NCC/UTA	1991 (As Carriage); 2002 (Conversion)	In use		Former 70 Class Driving Trailer, body destroyed by arson in 2002. Used for Permanent Way trains.
Unknown	Bridge Wagon	BCDR		Stored		1 of 3.
Unknown	Bridge Wagon	BCDR		Stored		1 of 3.
Unknown	Bridge Wagon	BCDR		Stored		1 of 3.
C378	Open Wagon	Courtaulds	1987	Stored		-
33	Brake Van	NCC	1987	Stored		Used in the lifting of the Portadown - Derry line. DCDR's first passenger-carrying vehicle.
C???	Flat	NCC		Stored		Brown Van underframe.
3084	Steam Crane	NCC	1994	Stored		Consists of crane, water wagon & jib wagon, built 1931. Capable of lifting 36t.
667	Goods Van	NCC	1987	Stored		Brown Van. 1 of 4.
674	Goods Van	NCC	1987	Stored		Brown Van. 1 of 4.
687	Goods Van	NCC	1987	Stored		Brown Van. 1 of 4.
688	Goods Van	NCC	1987	Stored		Brown Van. 1 of 4.
Unknown	Underframe	BNM	1999	In use		Part of former Bord na Móna track laying vehicle. Regauged and repurposed. Used by Permanent Way department. Named ''Pink Panther''.
Unknown	Underframe	BNM	1999	In use		Part of former Bord na Móna track laying vehicle. Regauged and repurposed. Currently carries detached conveyor from Ballast Regulator 315.
C32	Open Wagon	UTA	1985	Stored		Pyramid ends.

==== Permanent Way Vehicles ====
Vehicle ID	Original Operator	Arrived At DCDR	Current Status	Photo	Notes	
558 (7017)	NIR	2022	Operational		Geismar VMT crew transport vehicle with onboard jib	
5 (7005)	NIR	2022	Undergoing overhaul		Type 7 Tamper, last use with NIR was Derry line relay in 2013	
7 (7007)	NIR	2008	Stored		Type 7 Tamper	
315	NIR	2010	Operational		USP3000C Ballast Regulator	
Atlas	NIR	2010	Operational		Road-Rail equipped	Excavator
Komatsu	Railway Plant Services	2026	Operational		Road-Rail equipped	Excavator
Dumper	Hydrex Rail	2011	Operational		Road-Rail equipped	Nicknamed Daisy
Trailer	Hydrex Rail	2008	Operational		Road-Rail equipped	Hauled by Bruff or Dumper
Bruff	NIR	2015	Operational		Road-Rail equipped	Recovery Vehicle

==== Former DCDR Vehicles ====
Number	Type	Arrived At DCDR	Left DCDR	Fate	Reason	Notes
3BG	Steam Locomotive	1989	2001	Returned to Whitehead	Loan expired	Loaned to DCDR from RPSI.
3	Steam Locomotive	2005	2012	Returned to Whitehead	Loan expired	Loaned to DCDR from RPSI.
Daewoo	Road-Rail Excavator	2008	2013	Sold to Pakistan	Surplus to requirements	-
Komatsu	Road-Rail Excavator	2015	2026	Sold	Life-expired	-
JCB	Backhoe Excavator	1990	2009	Sold	Life-expired	-
2978	Bogie carriage	1995	2022	Scrapped	Life-expired	-
47M	Six-Wheeled Carriage	Unknown	2007	Scrapped	Roof collapse	-
713	70 Class Driving Trailer	1991	2002	Destroyed	Arson	Underframe survives as a flat wagon - see above.
448	GNR Carriage	Unknown	2006	Scrapped	Beyond repair	Only half of the coach body.
2053	GNR Brake Van	Unknown	2002	Destroyed	Arson	-
Unknown	Tank Wagon	Unknown	Unknown	Scrapped	Unknown	-
Unknown	GNR Goods Van	Unknown	2015	Destroyed	Destroyed by a storm	Grounded body.
HC1	Hedgecutter (formerly tamper)	2006	2020	Scrapped	Surplus to requirements, life-expired	-
8314	GSWR ballast hopper	1986	2023	Scrapped	Surplus to requirements, life-expired	-
C496	NIR ballast hopper	Unknown	2023	Scrapped	Surplus to requirements, life-expired	-
3189	CIÉ MkI Generator Van	2008	2025	Scrapped	Surplus to requirements, life-expired	-
RB3	NIR Railbus	2001	2025	Donated	Surplus to requirements	Moved to Gwendreath Valley Railway
Tar Boiler	Road vehicle	2017	2020	Returned to owner	Loan expired	Loaned to DCDR by private collector.

== Awards ==
- National Railway Heritage Awards; Ian Allan Railway Heritage Award (First Class): Received in 1992 in recognition of Downpatrick Station Building.
- Northern Ireland Tourist Board and British Airways Tourism Awards (Highly commended): Received for 'Best Project', December 1999.
- Heritage Railway Association; Carriage and Wagon Award (Highly commended): Received in 1999 in recognition of GSWR carriage No. 836.
- Down District Council; Tourism Heroes Award: Received in May 2008.
- Co-operation Ireland; Pride Of Place Award: Received in November 2012.
- Heritage Railway Association; Small Groups Award: Received in 2014 in recognition of its involvement of young people and its excellent building and museum development.
- Heritage Railway Association; Carriage and Wagon Award: Received in 2019 in recognition of the restoration of BCDR railmotor No. 72.
- Ulster Architectural Heritage Society; Heritage Angel Awards (Highly commended): Received in October 2019 in recognition of the restoration of Bundoran Junction North signal cabin.
- National Railway Heritage Awards; Abellio Signalling Award (Highly commended): Received in December 2019 in recognition of the restoration of Bundoran Junction North signal cabin.
- Heritage Railway Association; Lord Faulkner Young Volunteer Award: Received in February 2024, runner-up in March 2022.
- Social Enterprise Northern Ireland Awards; Social Enterprise of the Year (Under £500k): Received in November 2024.
- Social Enterprise Northern Ireland Awards; Emerging Leader of the Year: Received in November 2024.
- Social Enterprise Northern Ireland Awards; Leader of the Year (runner-up): Received in November 2024.
- Heritage Railway Association; Team of the Year: Received in February 2025.
- Heritage Railway Association; Achievement of the Year: Received in February 2025.

== Television and film appearances ==
- Children in Need Quiet Man Spoof (BBC One NI, 2001)
- Puckoon (2002)
- Flight to Freedom (BBC One NI, 2005)
- Rain (2005)
- A Potted History of Armagh (BBC One NI, 2006)
- Raising Steam, a 40-minute documentary of which the DCDR was the subject (BBC One NI, 2008)
- Our Wee World (BBC One NI/Barking Films, 2010)
- Christopher and His Kind, starring Matt Smith (BBC2/Mammoth Screen, 2011)
- Wodehouse in Exile, starring Tim Pigott-Smith and Paul Ritter (BBC 4, 2013)
- Walk the Line (Barra Best, BBC NI, 2014)
- The Lost City of Z, starring Robert Pattinson and Tom Holland (2015)
- A Patch of Fog, starring Stephen Graham (2015)
- The Woman in White (BBC, 2017)
- The Last Letter (BBC NI, 2018)
- Mrs Wilson (BBC, 2018)
- Agatha and the Truth of Murder (Channel 5, 2018)
- Extreme Railways, starring Chris Tarrant (Channel 5, 2019)
- Derry Girls (Channel 4, 2022)
- Rozkvet (2025)
- Crookhaven (CBBC, 2026)

== See also ==
- List of heritage railways in Northern Ireland
- History of rail transport in Ireland
- Sir John Macneil
