= King's Bridge Halt railway station =

Railway station in Northern Ireland

Coordinates: 54.358429°N 5.754544°W

Kings Bridge Halt was part of the Belfast and County Down Railway system. King's Bridge Halt opened on 1 November 1929 and closed January 1942 during the Second World War.

| Preceding station | Historical railways | Following station |
|---|---|---|
| Crossgar | Belfast and County Down Railway; Belfast-Newcastle | Downpatrick |
| Crossgar | Belfast and County Down Railway; Belfast-Newcastle-Ardglass | Downpatrick Loop Platform |
