= Tullymurry railway station =

Former railway station in Northern Ireland

Tullymurry
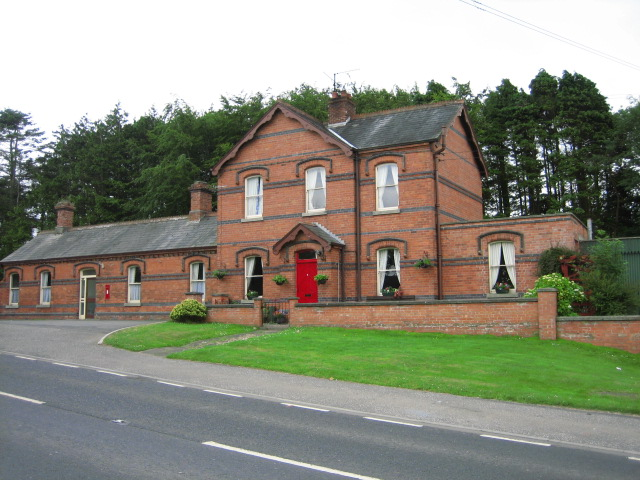
- Tullymurry railway station

General information
- Location: Tullymurry, County Down; Northern Ireland
- Coordinates: 54.300745°N 5.800126°W

Other information
- Status: Disused

History
- Original company: Belfast and County Down Railway
- Pre-grouping: Belfast and County Down Railway
- Post-grouping: Great Northern Railway (Ireland)

Key dates
- 7 August 1871: Station opens
- 1896: Rebuilt and relocated 500m south west
- 16 January 1950: Station closes
Location

Tullymurry railway station was on the Belfast and County Down Railway which ran from Belfast to Newcastle, County Down in Northern Ireland.

== History ==
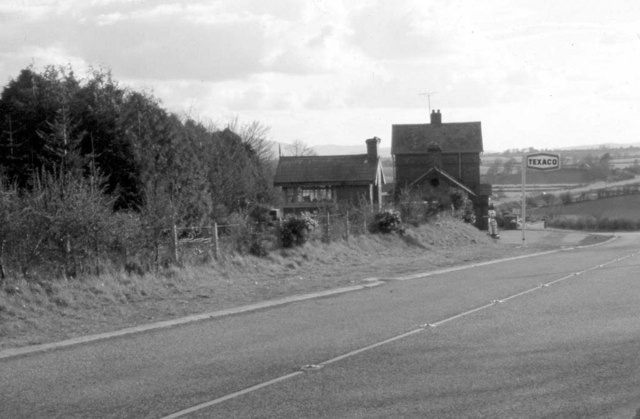
Tullymurry station and signal box in use as a Texaco fuel station in 1979

The station was opened by the Belfast and County Down Railway on 7 August 1871.

In 1896 it was relocated around 500 metres to the south west.

Before the opening of Ballykinlar Halt in 1914, the station was the main transport link for Ballykinlar Camp.

The station closed to passengers in 1950, by which time it had been taken over by the Ulster Transport Authority.

| Preceding station | Historical railways | Following station |
|---|---|---|
| Downpatrick Loop Platform | Belfast and County Down Railway; Belfast-Newcastle | Ballykinlar Halt |
