= Orenstein & Koppel CSÉT Shunting Locomotives =

Class of industrial steam engines used in Irish sugar factories

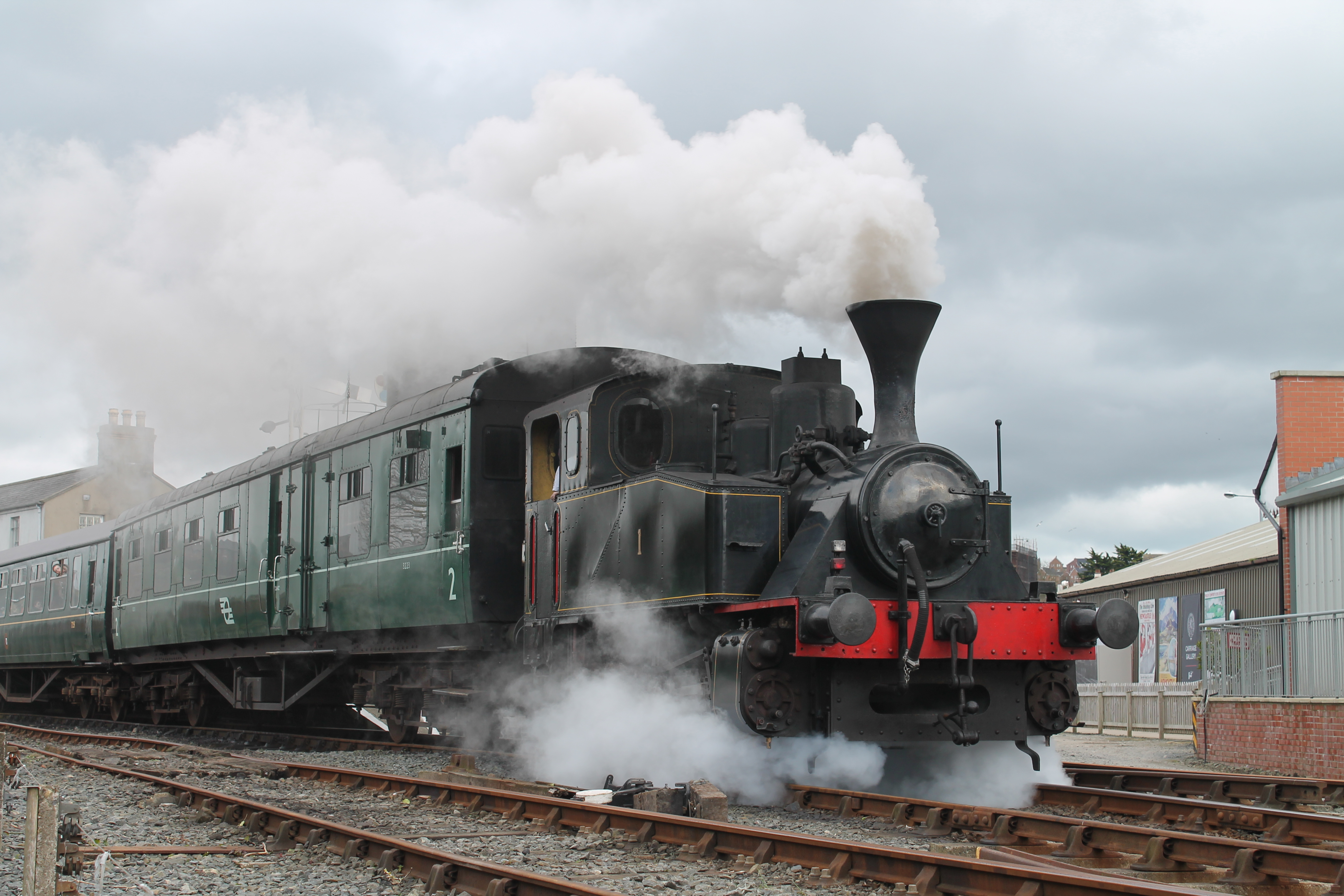
- Thurles No. 1 at Downpatrick in 2014
Type and origin
- Power type: Steam
- Builder: Orenstein & Koppel
- Build date: First 6, 1934; Latter 3, 1935
- Total produced: 9
Specifications
- Configuration
  - Whyte: 0-4-0T+WT
- Gauge: 5 ft 3 in (1,600 mm)
Career
- Operators: Comlucht Siúcre Éireann Teoranta
- Numbers: 1, 2 & 3 (One locomotive of each number per factory)
- Nicknames: Sugarpuffs, O&K's
- Withdrawn: 1950s-1960s
- Preserved: Thurles No.1, Mallow No. 3
- Disposition: Two preserved, remainder scrapped

The O&K CSÉT Shunting Locomotives were a class of nine small Irish steam locomotives built in Berlin, Germany, by Orenstein & Koppel for shunting wagons of sugar beet at the three Irish Sugar Company (Comlucht Siúcre Éireann) factories in Mallow, Thurles and Tuam. (There was another factory at Carlow, but it used vertical-boilered Belgian locomotives.) They were delivered in two batches, with the first six arriving in 1934 and the last three in 1935. The 1934 batch was paid for by barter, using cattle as payment. Each factory received three locomotives, and numbered them independently, leading to each factory having a No. 1, a No. 2 and a No. 3. Each factory applied their own design of number onto the tanks, and in some cases, bufferbeams, of their respective locomotives.

== History ==
There was no official class designation, but in preservation they have gained the nicknames Sugarpuffs, due to their small size and careers in the sugar industry, and O&Ks, which is the acronym of their manufacturer. Withdrawals and scrapping of most of the locomotives took place during the 1960s, with only Thurles No. 1 and Mallow No. 3 surviving. The latter locomotive was the last steam locomotive to be in service in the Republic of Ireland for the famous sugar beet campaign, as CIÉ's dieselisation programme was complete by this point, 1963.

The locomotives were easy to recognise in Ireland thanks to their diminutive size and European characteristics - which included a sandbox on top of the boiler, and a funnel-shaped chimney which allowed for the potential fitting of a spark arrestor for wood-burning. Unusually, they also have a well tank in addition to two side tanks.

Table of locomotives
Running Number	Works Number	Original Factory	Built	Fate
1	12473	Mallow	Orenstein & Koppel, Berlin, 1934	Scrapped
2	12474	Mallow	Orenstein & Koppel, Berlin, 1934	Scrapped
3	12662	Mallow	Orenstein & Koppel, Berlin, 1935	Preserved
1	12475	Thurles	Orenstein & Koppel, Berlin, 1934	Preserved
2	12476	Thurles	Orenstein & Koppel, Berlin, 1934	Scrapped
3	12663	Thurles	Orenstein & Koppel, Berlin, 1935	Scrapped
1	12478	Tuam	Orenstein & Koppel, Berlin, 1934	Scrapped
2	12477	Tuam	Orenstein & Koppel, Berlin, 1934	Scrapped
3	12664	Tuam	Orenstein & Koppel, Berlin, 1935	Scrapped

== In Preservation ==
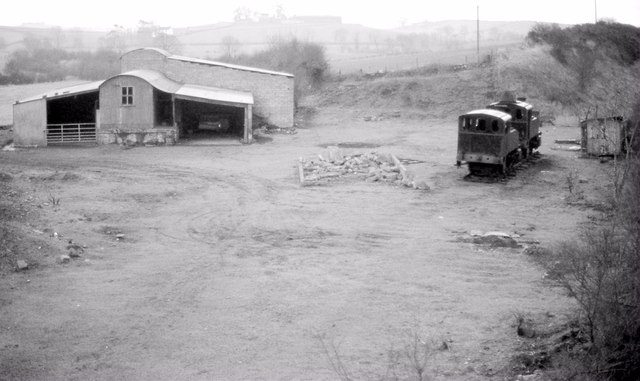
Preserved O&Ks 1 and 3 stored at Ballynahinch Junction in 1983.

Two locomotives are preserved, No. 1 of Thurles, and No. 3 of Mallow, both at the Downpatrick and County Down Railway. After being displaced by Ruston Hornsby diesels, Nos. 1 and 3, as well as Thurles No. 2, were purchased for preservation in England and moved to Dalkey, Dublin in 1974. They remained there until 1977, when CIÉ required the siding they occupied. CIÉ offered a disused bus garage at the former MGWR Broadstone station to the locomotives as a replacement home, but this necessitated transport by lorry through Dublin. To cover the costs of this, No. 2 was sold to a scrap merchant, where she languished for several years as her new owners, reluctant to cut her up, tried to find a buyer. Despite their best efforts, no buyer was found and she was scrapped in 1978. That same year, Nos. 1 & 3 were moved by road from Broadstone to the former site of Ballynahinch Junction railway station, and it was here that their owner finally realised that the gauge in Ireland was substantially wider than that of Great Britain, thus rendering the locomotives useless to him.

They remained in the open at Ballynahinch Junction until 1987 when they were bought by and transported to the Downpatrick and County Down Railway. No. 3 was sent to Whitehead for overhaul in 1997, and upon return to Downpatrick, gave 12 years of service between 2000 and 2012. No. 1 was similarly sent to Whitehead in 2007, returning in 2012 and taking over from No. 3. She is still in service, operating all DCDR passenger trains, with the exception of the occasional diesel special. No. 3's boiler was sent to Whitehead for overhaul in January 2016, returning in early 2017, and on Thursday 24 August the locomotive was reassembled so that testing could start. No. 3 was steamed in her frames for the first time post-overhaul on 19 May 2018, and passed her final boiler inspection on 12 November 2018, releasing her into traffic. Following a final general running test on 24 November 2018, No. 3 was fit for passenger traffic, hauling her first revenue-earning train since overhaul on the night of 22 December 2018.

== Gallery ==
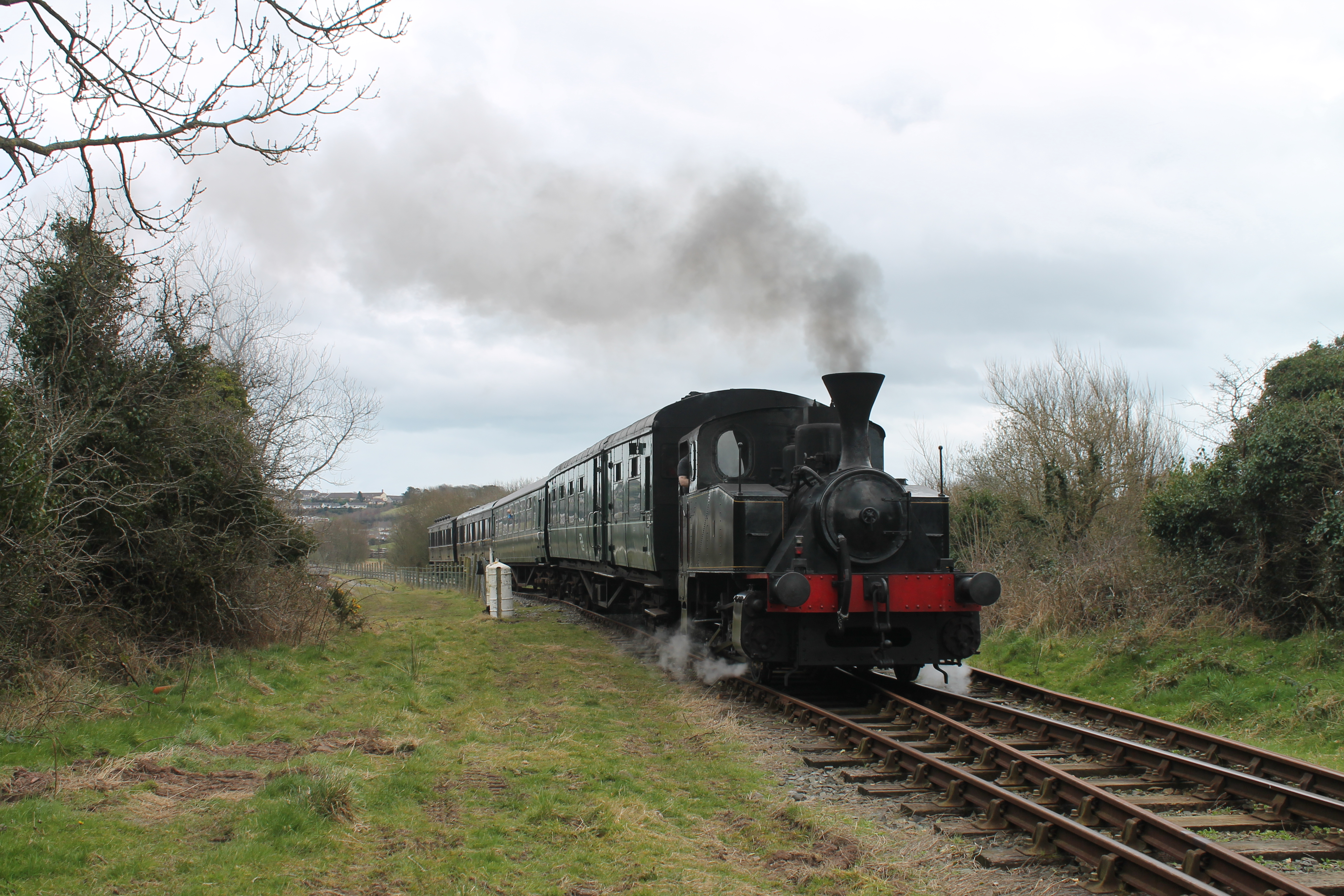

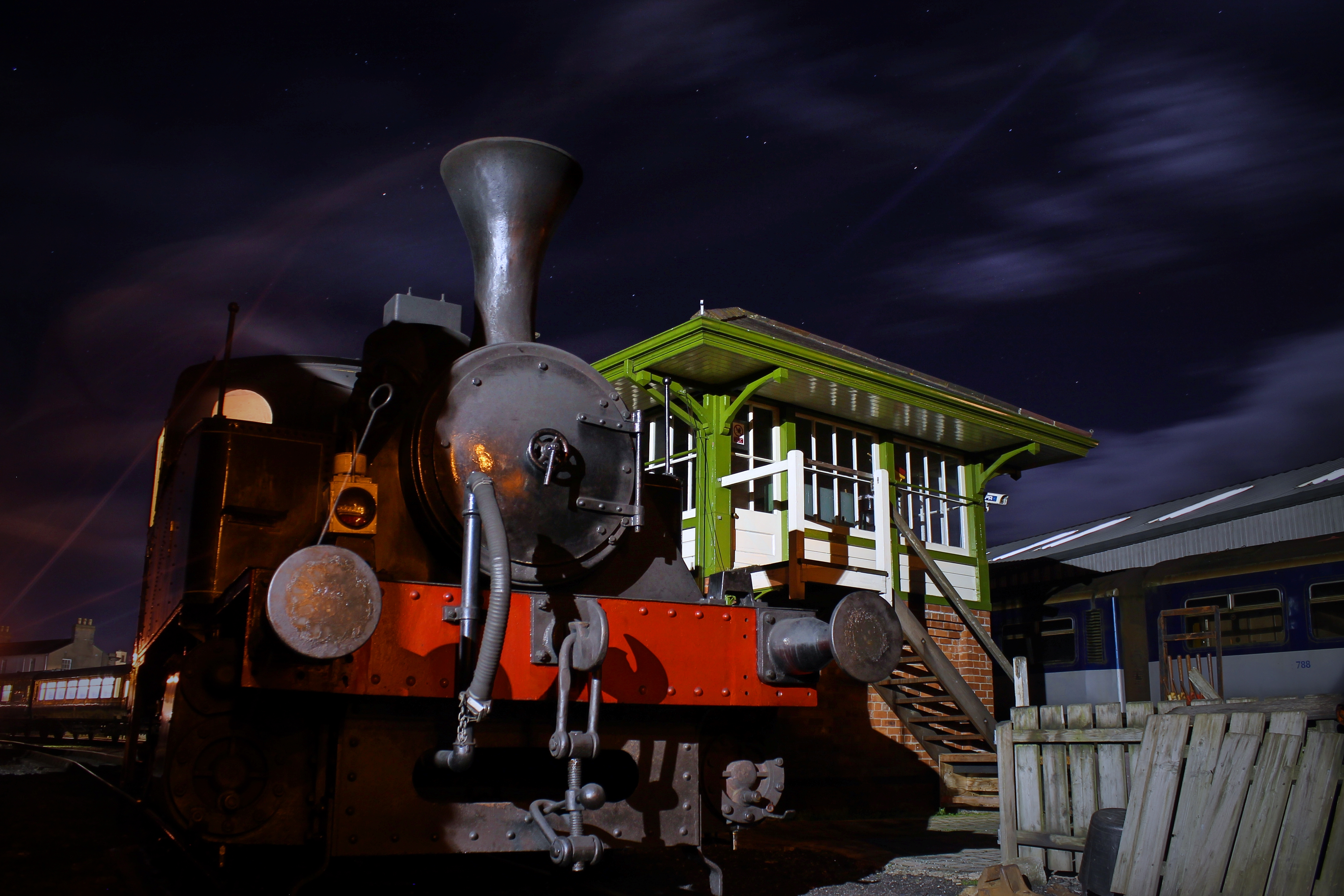

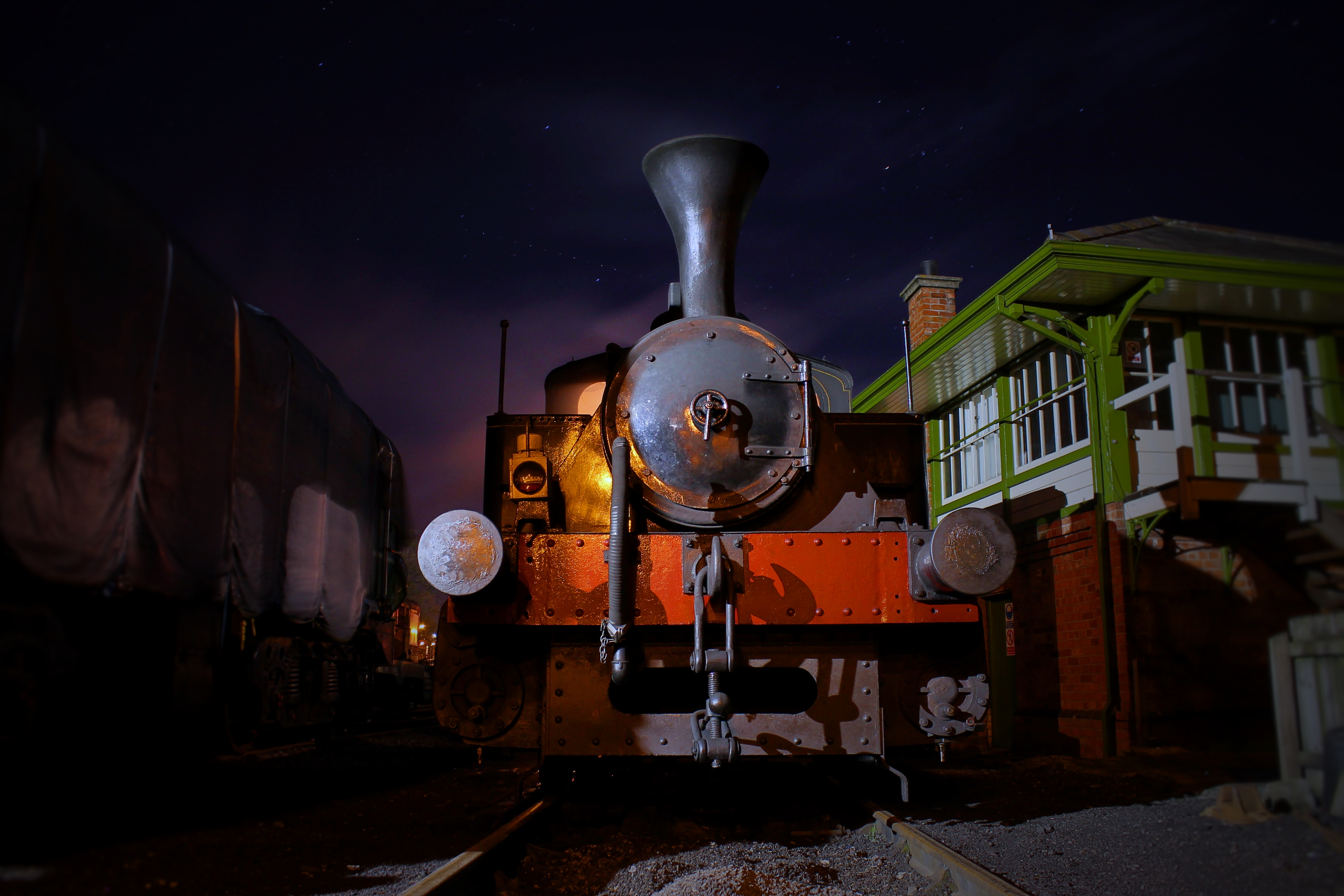

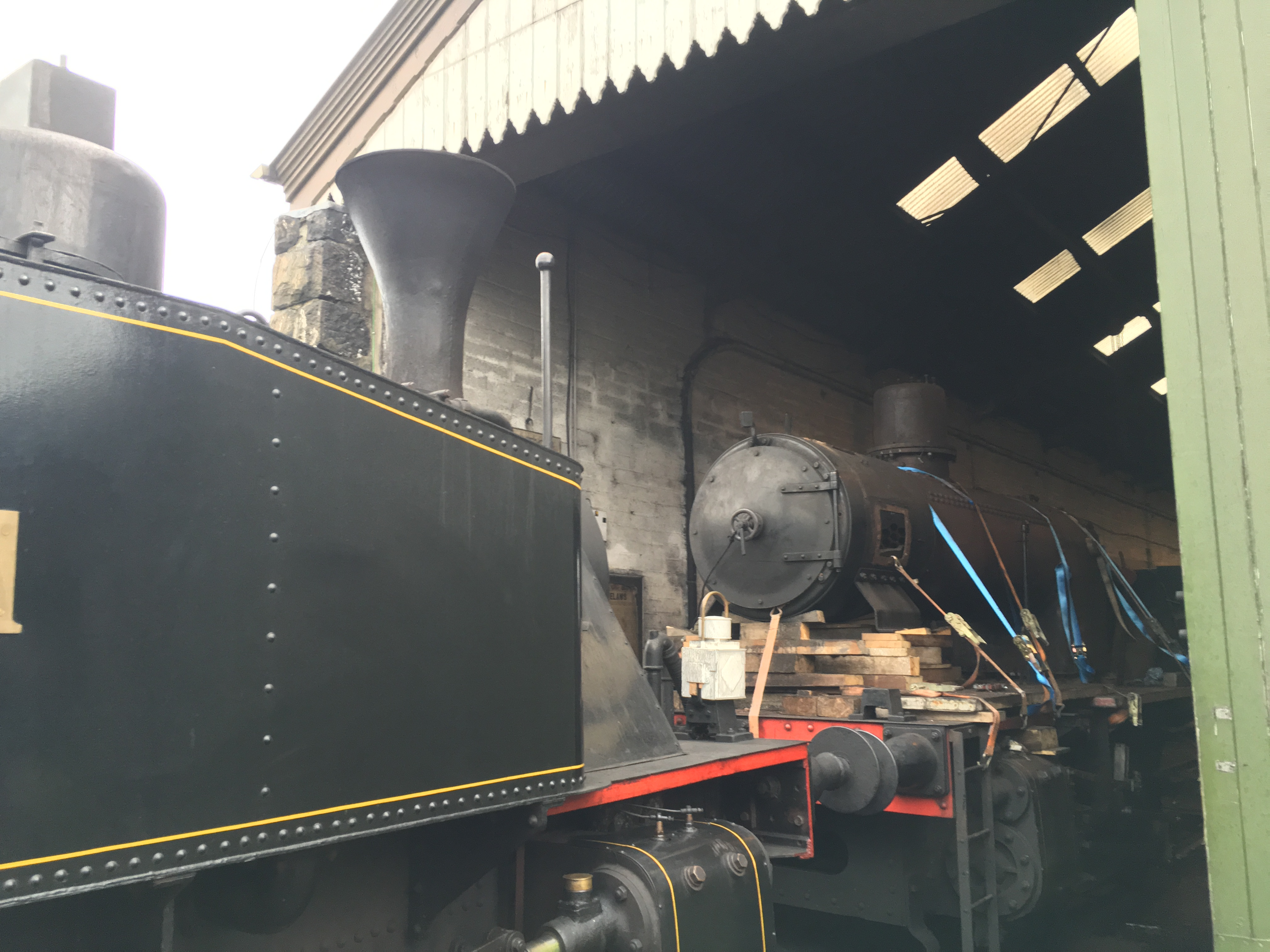

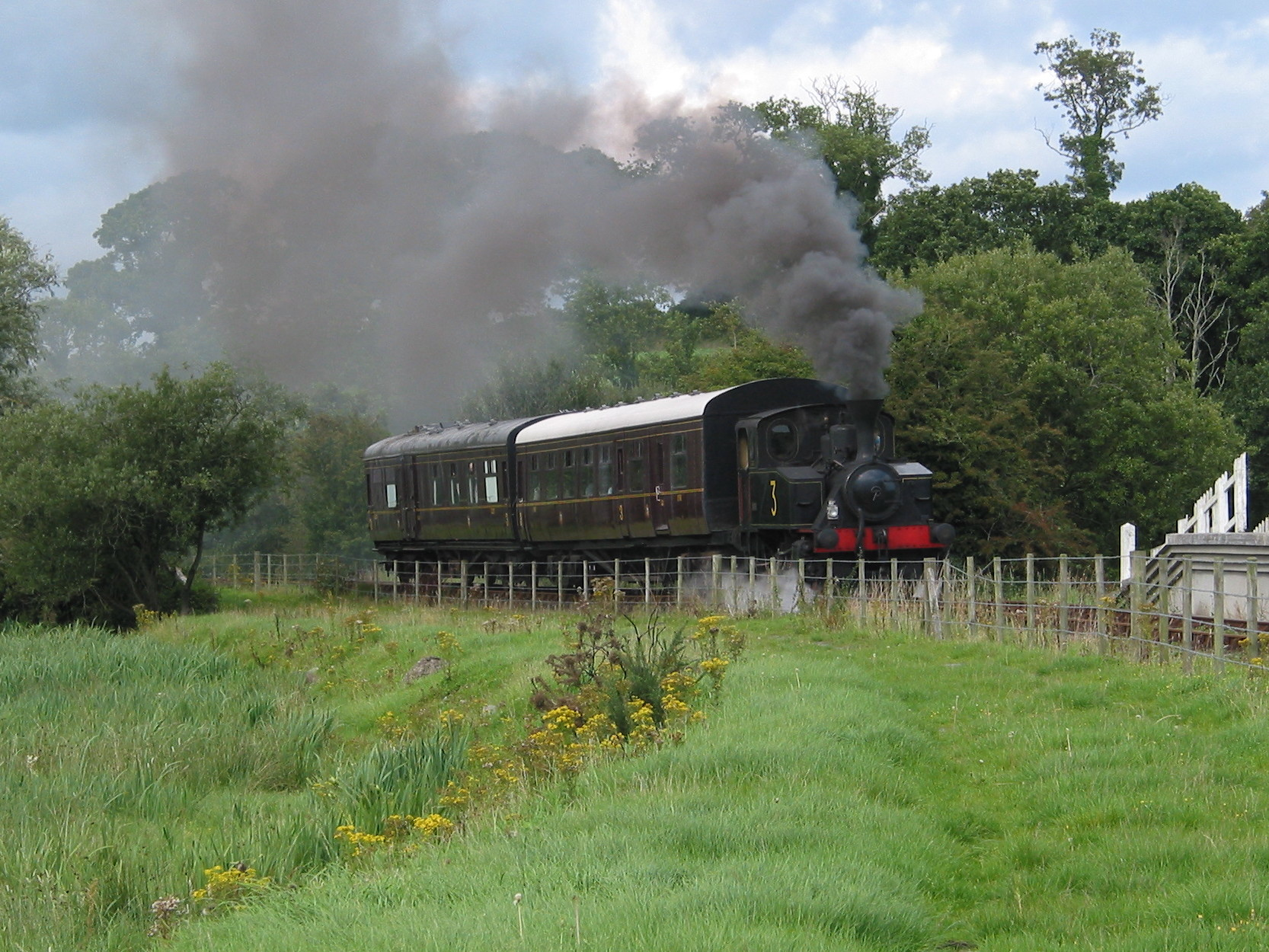

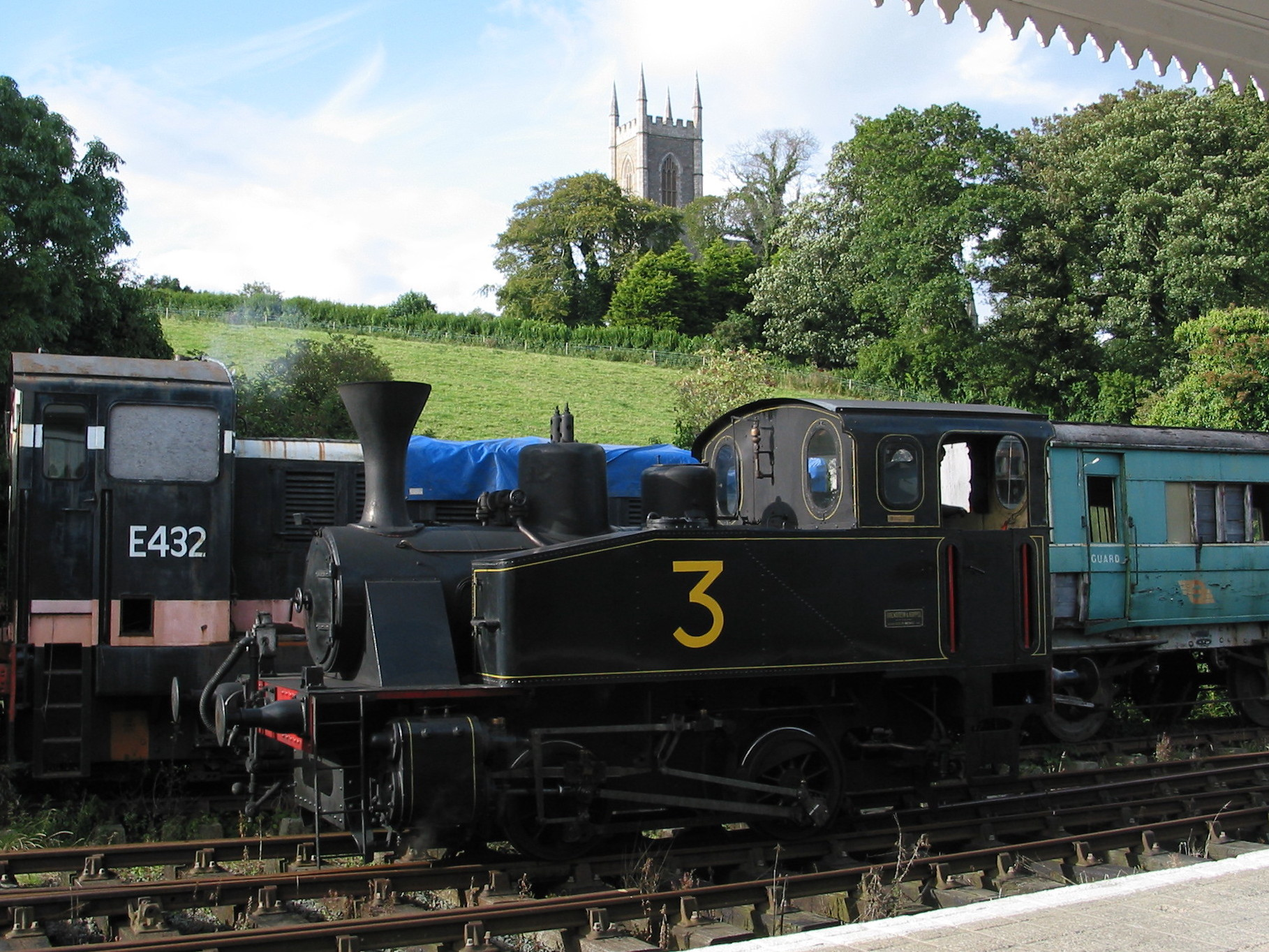
