= Newcastle railway station (Northern Ireland) =

Former railway station in County Down, Northern Ireland

Coordinates: 54.214766°N 5.887367°W

Newcastle (County Down)
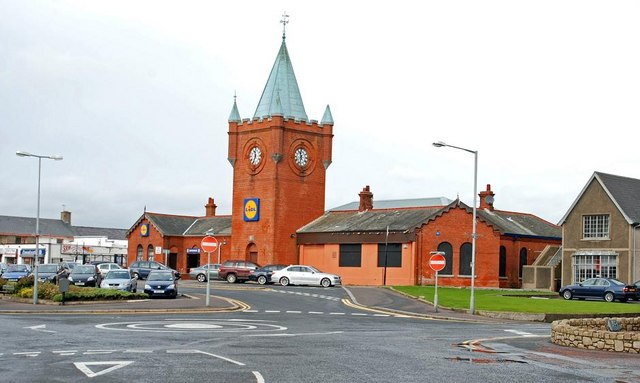
- Newcastle station as it stands today, now a Lidl supermarket

General information
- Location: Railway Street, Newcastle; County Down; Northern Ireland

Other information
- Status: Disused

History
- Original company: Belfast and County Down Railway
- Pre-grouping: Belfast and County Down Railway/Great Northern Railway (Ireland)

Key dates
- 25 March 1869: Station opens
- 16 January 1950: Services to Queen's Quay and Downpatrick cease
- 2 May 1955: Station closes
Location

Newcastle railway station was on the Belfast and County Down Railway which ran from Belfast to Newcastle, County Down in Northern Ireland.

== History ==
The station was opened by the Belfast and County Down Railway on 25 March 1869 when they opened the Downpartick, Dundrum and Newcastle Railway, extending their main line south of Downpatrick. A branch to Castlewellan linking to Banbridge opened on 24 March 1906, which was also operated by the Great Northern Railway (Ireland), which owned the rest of the branch and had running powers to Newcastle.

The Ulster Transport Authority took over the BCDR in 1948, only to close it over a year later on 16 January 1950 (bar the Bangor branch), but the branch from Newcastle to Castlewellan remained open under the GNRI's operation until 2 May 1955. The station is now a Lidl supermarket.

== Routes ==
Preceding station	Historical railways	Following station
Dundrum	Belfast and County Down Railway; Belfast-Newcastle	Terminus
Castlewellan	Belfast and County Down Railway/Great Northern Railway (Ireland); Castlewellan-Newcastle	Terminus
