= Downpatrick railway station =

Heritage railway station in County Down, Northern Ireland

Coordinates: 54.325334°N 5.723319°W

Downpatrick
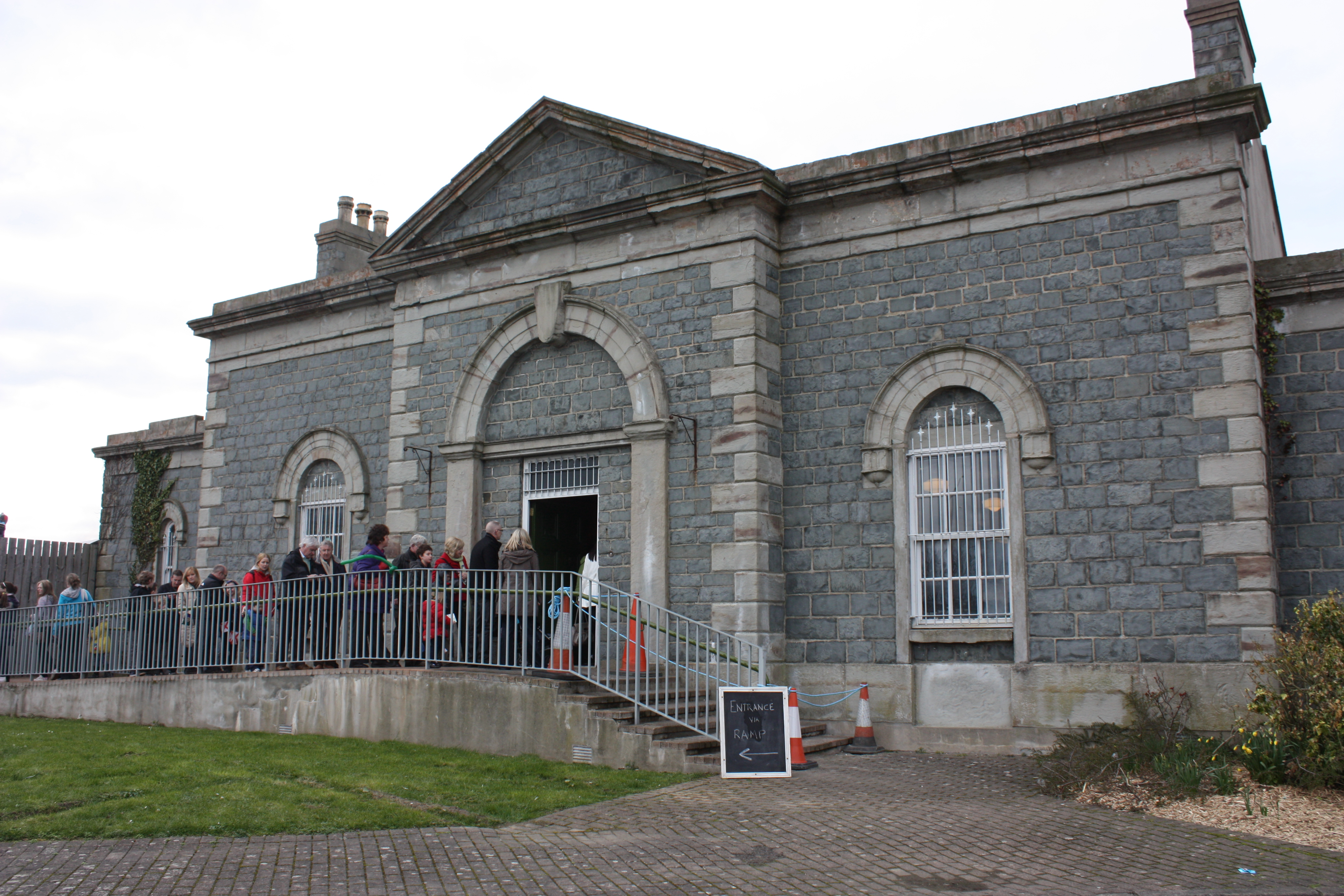

General information
- Location: Downpatrick, County Down; Northern Ireland
- Owner: Downpatrick and County Down Railway
- Operator: Downpatrick and County Down Railway
- Lines: North Line; South Line
- Platforms: 2 (1 disused)

History
- Original company: Belfast and County Down Railway
- Pre-grouping: Belfast and County Down Railway
- Post-grouping: Ulster Transport Authority

Key dates
- 23 March 1859: First station opens
- 24 April 1950: First station closes
- 7 May 1990: Second station opened by DCDR on a new site
- 26 December 2002: Interior destroyed by arson
- 21 September 2003: Building reopened after restoration
Route map
Location

Downpatrick railway station was on the Belfast and County Down Railway, which ran its longest route from Belfast to Downpatrick in Northern Ireland. Today it is the headquarters of the Downpatrick and County Down Railway.

== History ==
Downpatrick was opened in March 1859 by the Belfast and County Down Railway, as the terminus of their line from Queen's Quay station. In 1869 the Downpatrick, Dundrum & Newcastle Railway opened, connecting Newcastle to the BCDR system at Downpatrick. It was worked by the BCDR for its entire independent existence, being absorbed by the BCDR in 1871. Downpatrick became the terminus of yet another line in 1892 following the opening of the Downpatrick, Killough & Ardglass railway, which was built and operated by the BCDR. Coinciding with this, a direct curve from the Belfast line to the Newcastle line was built, and an interchange station (It had no external access) roughly 700m south of Downpatrick was provided at the junction, named Downpatrick Loop Platform. The Loop Platform brought an end to the time-consuming practice of Belfast – Newcastle trains having to enter Downpatrick and run around; instead stopping at the Loop Platform with passengers for Downpatrick catching a connecting train.

At its peak, Downpatrick station boasted a turntable, small engine shed, a cattle beach, goods shed and multiple sidings. The station itself was an elaborate affair with a large brick building and an overall glass roof covering the Northern section of the main platform and its associated run-around loop. The bay platform and its loop were covered by a shorter wooden canopy which adjoined the main building. The station and yard were situated on Market Street, roughly where The Grove shopping centre stands today.

The station closed completely in 1950, by which time it had been taken over by the Ulster Transport Authority. It was used as a bus station before demolition.

== Today ==
After a 37-year-long absence, Downpatrick was served by trains once more in 1987. The current railway station is the headquarters of the heritage Downpatrick and County Down Railway. The station yard, which is on a different site to the original BCDR station (opposite the modern bus station), consists of two locomotive sheds, two signal cabins, a carriage workshop, a carriage museum, the station itself, and various sidings and other structures. In the early hours of Boxing Day 2002, the station building was gutted by arson. It was renovated and reopened on 21 September 2003.

The station building was moved from across the street to its present location in the 1990s. Its previous role was that of the Gas Manager's House. The ground floor hosts the ticket office, shop, model railway room and toilets, the latter two of which are accessed from the platform. The first floor is home to a museum of BCDR railwayana. Downpatrick Station currently only has one operational platform, with a second, slightly shorter one, to be reinstated in the near future. A restored signal cabin from Bundoran Junction is at the north end of the platform. At the south end is a water tower and signal post.

The station stood in for Derry and Castlerock railway stations in the Derry Girls Season 3 episode, Strangers On A Train.

== Services ==
Preceding station	Historical railways	Following station
King's Bridge Halt	Belfast and County Down Railway; Belfast-Newcastle	Train reverses
Downpatrick Loop Platform	Belfast and County Down Railway; Belfast-Newcastle	Train reverses
Tullymurry	Downpatrick, Dundrum and Newcastle Railway; Downpatrick-Newcastle	Terminus
Downpatrick Loop Platform	Downpatrick, Killough and Ardglass Railway; Downpatrick-Ardglass	Terminus
	Heritage railways	
Inch Abbey	Downpatrick and County Down Railway; North Line	Terminus
Downpatrick Loop Platform	Downpatrick and County Down Railway; South Line	Terminus

== Gallery ==
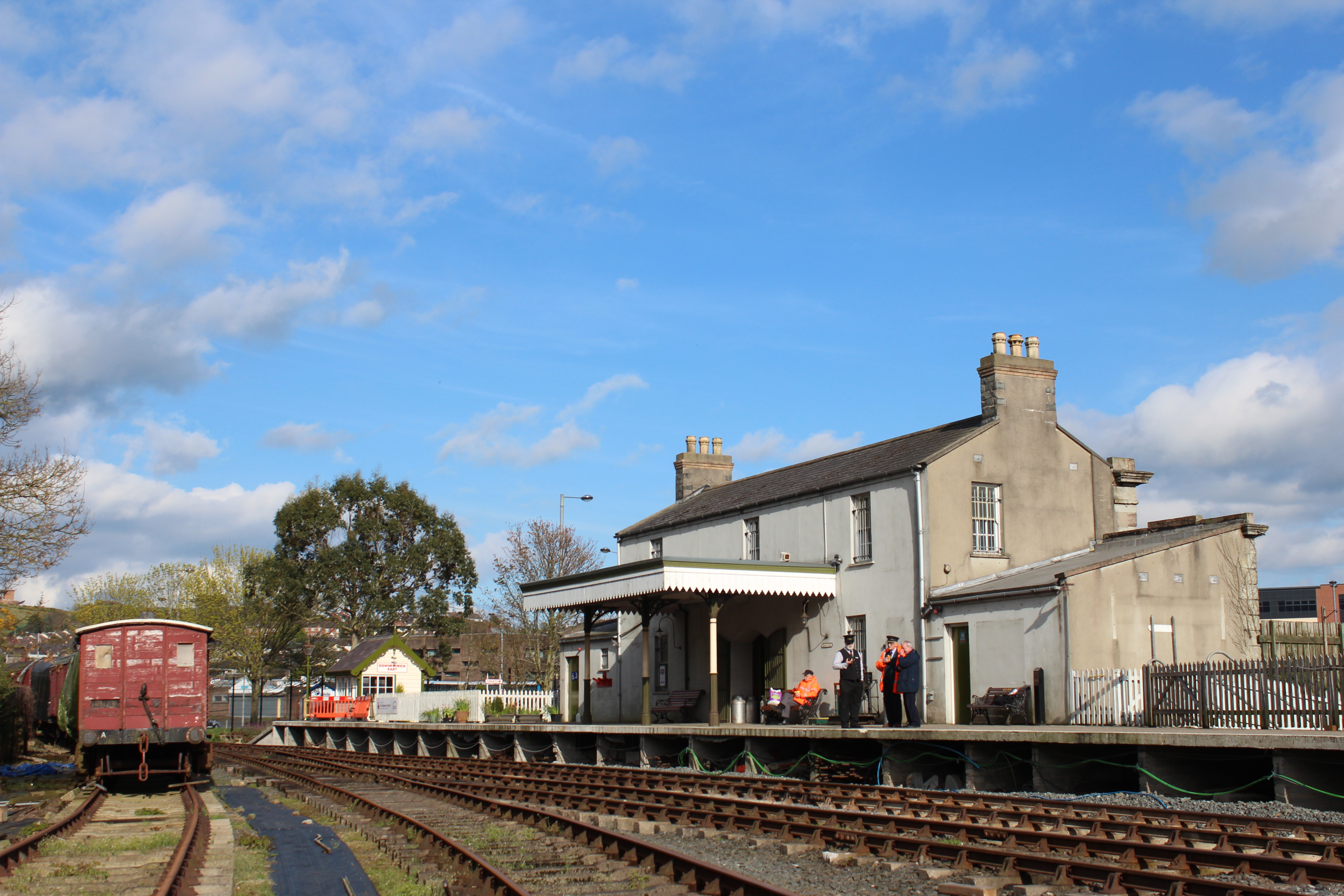
The station as seen from the locomotive yard.

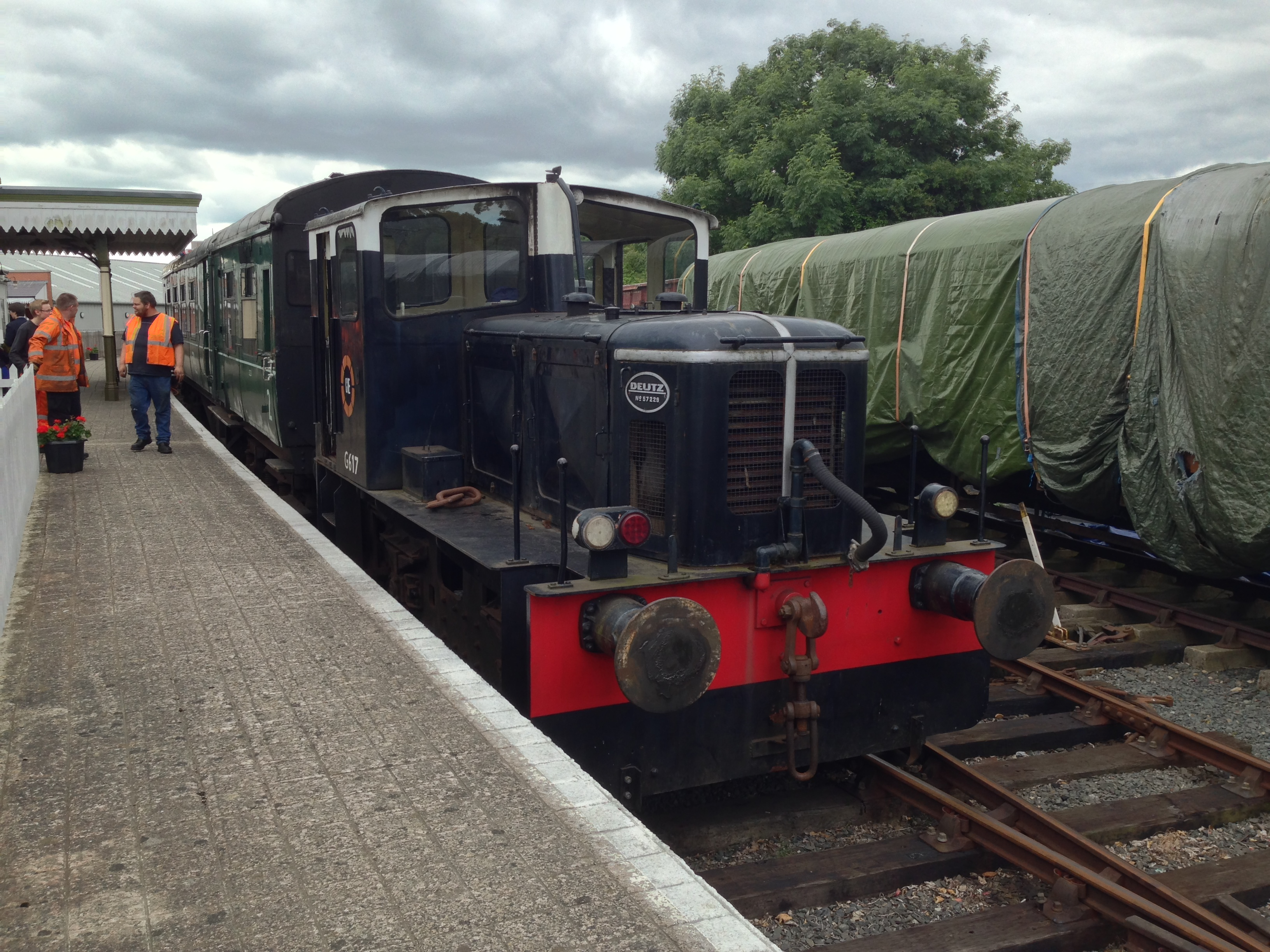
A diesel passenger train at Downpatrick station.

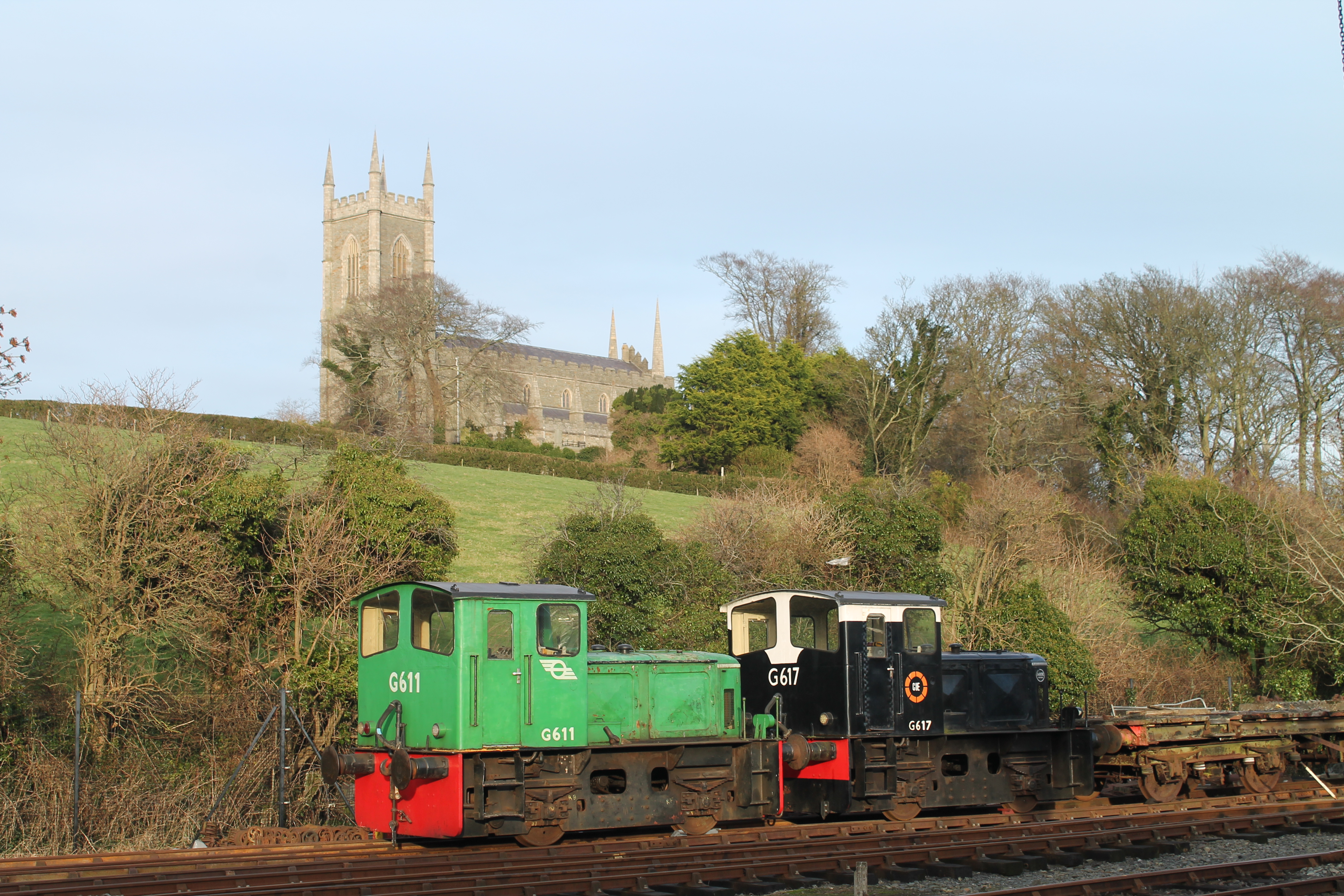
Two ex-CIÉ G Class diesel locomotives in a siding at Downpatrick station. Down Cathedral can be seen above.

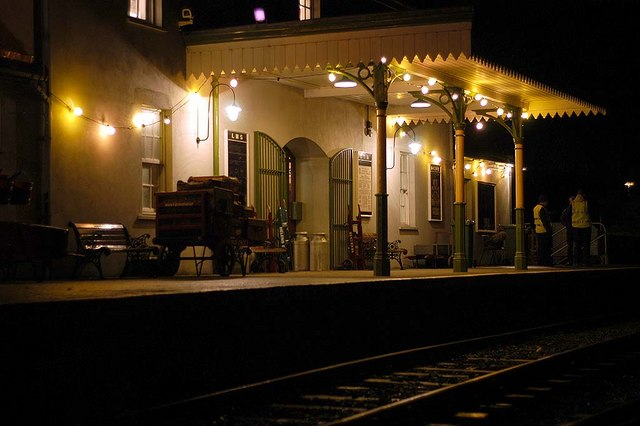
The station canopy (from Maghera railway station) and building lit up at night.

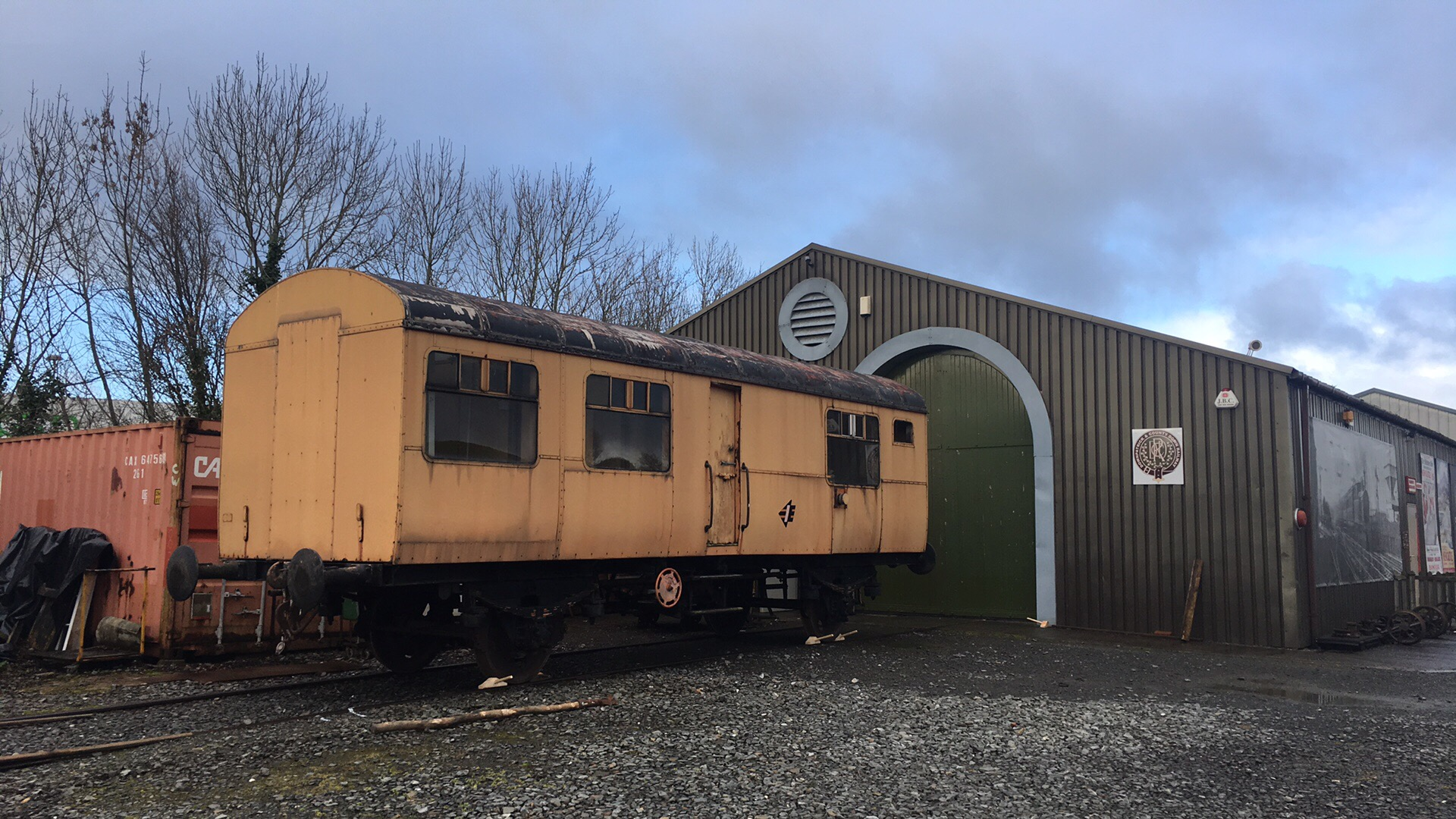
The Carriage Workshop, part of the station complex.

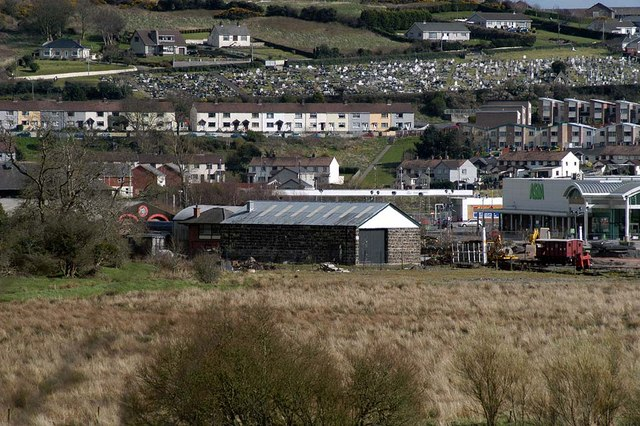
The station's locomotive shed (relocated from Maghera).
