= Neill's Hill railway station =

Disused railway station in Northern Ireland

Neill's Hill
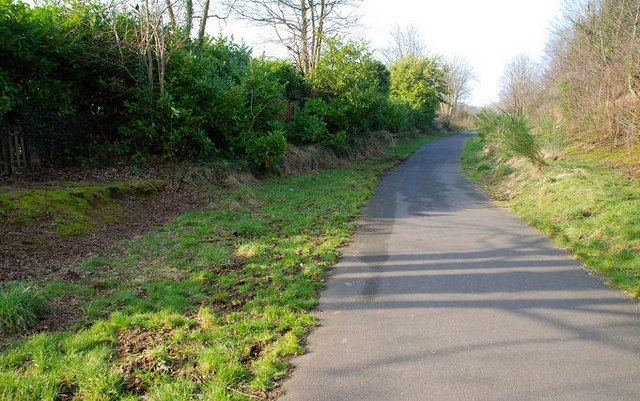
- The former site of Neill's Hill station, now part of the Comber Greenway

General information
- Location: Belfast, County Down, Northern Ireland
- Coordinates: 54.590607°N 5.865441°W
- Platforms: 2

History
- Opened: 1 March 1890
- Closed: 15 January 1950
- Original company: Belfast and County Down Railway
- Pre-grouping: Belfast and County Down Railway
- Post-grouping: Ulster Transport Authority
Location

Neill's Hill railway station is a disused railway station / halt on the main line of the Belfast and County Down Railway. It ran from Queen's Quay, Belfast south to Newcastle, County Down in Northern Ireland.

When the Belfast and County Down Railway was open, Neill's Hill railway station was the 4th station from Queen's Quay, Belfast. After traversing Ballymacarrett Junction (where a station existed at Ballymacarrett on the Bangor Line) the preceding stations were Fraser Street Halt and Bloomfield. The stations following Neill's Hill were Knock, Dundonald, Comber railway station, Ballygowan railway station, Shepherd's Bridge Halt, Saintfield railway station, Ballynahinch Junction, Crossgar, King's Bridge Halt, Downpatrick North Junction, Downpatrick, Downpatrick South Junction, Downpatrick Loop Platform, Tullymurry, Ballykinler, Dundrum, Junction with Castlewellan line and the terminus at Newcastle railway station in Newcastle.

== History ==
=== Ballycloughan Road (Knock Road) ===
BCDR built the main line from Belfast Queen's Quay to Newtownards in 1850 with both passengers and goods being carried. The railway was now serving the villages of Ballyhackamore and Gilnahirk. The railway was to encourage the development of those villages into the outlying Belfast suburbs of today. There was a level crossing at Ballyclougan Nursery on the Ballycloughan Road. This road was later to be known as Knock Road. The first station building at Knock began with part of the Holywood station being moved to Knock. A 2-storey station house was built at Knock on the down side in 1869. Knock sits at mile post 2¾.

=== Cadger's Loaney (Sandown Road) ===
A Mr Sinclair Boyd owned land at Ballyhackamore in east Belfast. Mr Boyd's business, 'Sinclair & Boyd' built many houses in the surrounding districts. To make the bricks, he quarried the sand-hills around the railway line at Cadger's Loaney and had brick-fields in that area. In June 1877, a siding consisting of a short loop was installed off the main line to cater for this trade. A level-crossing was in existence. Cadger's Loaney later changed its name to Sandown Road, Belfast.

=== Bloomfield (Beersbridge Road) ===
Between 1876 and 1878, Sinclair Boyd entered into discussions with the BCDR to build a station at Bloomfield. This part of the line also had a level-crossing. Bloomfield station sits at mile post 1¼. In 1884, the wagons used for the Neill's Hill sand traffic were the only ones available for the BCDR Civil Engineer to use for ballast work on the permanent way.

=== Doubling ===
The line to Knock was doubled and the new line opened on 28 May 1888. New footbridges and up platforms were built at both Bloomfield and Knock stations to cater for the additional track. Three level crossings, including Cadger's Loaney were widened. The gates were moved to Knock crossing as part of a penny pinching exercise. 'Sinclair & Boyds' sand siding had the turnout moved to take the shunting away from the level crossing area.

=== Opening of Neill's Hill ===
Following the successful doubling of the track to Knock, a decision was made by the BCDR to build a small station on the up side of Neill's Hill crossing. Coakham states that the cost of two small platforms, with a shelter on each and a small booking office would have an estimated cost of £250. Although Bloomfield and Knock stations had footbridges, BCDR felt that there was no need for a footbridge at the more respectable sounding site on the Sandown Road.

Neill's Hill station opened on 1 March 1890 with a gateman acting as stationmaster and assisted by a boy porter. A subway was added in 1897 alongside the level crossing. In 1904, a more substantial station building was built on the down platform. This would have faced out onto what later became Sandown Park South. Neill's Hill station sits at mile post 2¼. A timber signal cabin was later built on the down side of the crossing at an angle to the track for visibility. Following rationalisation of the signalling, this cabin was removed in 1925 and replaced by a 3 lever ground frame on the opposite side. Permanent Way workmen loaded the signal cabin onto the 12:15pm stone train and brought it into Belfast.

The sand siding had been closed and built over in the 1920s. This would have been the Clara Park and Neill's Hill Park area.

In 1922, BCDR considered using Baltic Class engines on the main line and a survey recommended that the platform walls would require to be rebuilt to improve the clearance at Bloomfield, Neill's Hill, Knock and one at Comber.

=== Railway Station Floral Competition ===
In 1937, the Belfast Telegraph reported that Neill's Hill station is among the prize-winners in the BCDR floral competition following a recent inspection by the BCDR directors.

=== Reduction of Neill's Hill to Halt status ===
As part of economy measures in 1946, the BCDR reduced the status of Neill's Hill from a 'station' to a 'halt'. This status change also occurred at Knock, Dundonald, Craigavad, Ballynahinch Junction, Killough, Sydenham, Carnalea. Cultra was made an unattended halt.

=== Incidents ===
In his book, Coakham relates an incident when an up Sunday train came past Bloomfield when the engine uncoupled and ran ahead into the Neill's Hill sand siding. Smart work at the points allowed the carriages to trundle past on the main line.

Coakham also reports that BCDR engine number 6 achieved 60 mph through Neill's Hill in the latter war years. The magic '60' had only been achieved in 1944.

=== Closure ===
The Ulster Transport Authority had taken over the BCDR and closed the main line to Newcastle on Sunday 15 January 1950. The halt at Neill's Hill closed at the same time. Housing had been built in the 1950s at Sandhill Gardens followed by Orangefield Road. Both roads followed the line of the railway from Clara Park to North Road. The track was not lifted until after 1954 by which time the station buildings had fallen into disrepair. The subway was filled in in the early 1960s with the buildings also being demolished around that time.

== The Site Today ==
Preceding station	Historical railways	Following station
Bloomfield	Belfast and County Down Railway; Belfast-Newcastle	Knock

=== Knock Valley Sewage Scheme ===
In 2003, a major Belfast sewage scheme saw a main sewer being built the whole length of the former main line between Comber and Belfast. As Neill's Hill had the only subway on the route, this had to be cut through by the builders. Photographic evidence from them shows the subway to be in good condition.

=== The Comber Greenway ===
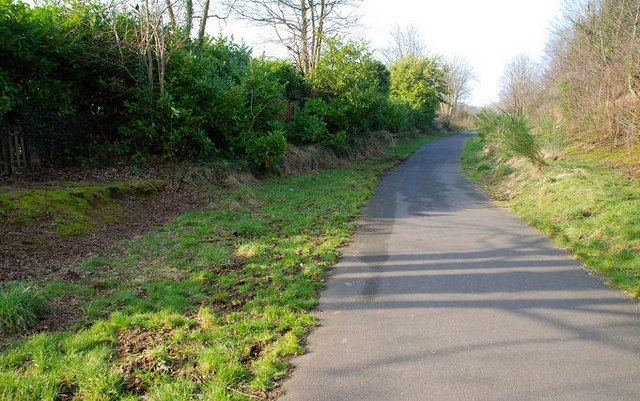
Site of Neill's Hill station

The Comber Greenway is a 7-mile traffic-free section of the National Cycle Network, in development along the old Belfast-Comber railway line. The cycle path starts on Dee Street in Belfast and finishes at Comber. Now completed the Greenway provides an eco-friendly cycle path with views of Stormont and Scrabo Tower.

On the way out of Belfast, the Greenway goes through many of the old BCDR stations i.e. Bloomfield, Neill's Hill, Knock, Dundonald before finishing just short of Comber station.

== The Future - EWAY ==
Both the Regional Transportation Strategy (RTS) for Northern Ireland and the Belfast Metropolitan Transport Plan (BMTP) recognised the value of introducing rapid transit services in Belfast. In 2004 the BMTP stated that the pilot stage of a rapid transit network could be implemented (subject to economic appraisal, budgetary processes and the completion of statutory processes) within the 2015 Plan period. It confirmed EWAY as the preferred option which would serve the Newtownards corridor and its success would dictate the extent, if any, of further development of the rapid transit network.

An announcement by the BBC confirmed that the EWAY will not be using The Comber Greenway as part of its route.

== Neill's Hill in Print ==
Sir Kenneth Bloomfield, former Head of the NI Civil Service quotes in his autobiography, "Stormont in Crisis, A Memoir" - "... There too, 'the railway path' led alongside the line of the old Belfast and County Down Railway to the small station at Neill's Hill, a halt straight out of The Railway Children with level-crossing gates, stationmaster's house with neat beds of nasturtiums, and a malodorous subway in which early sexual encounters took place."

Gerry Cochrane, a founder member of the Downpatrick and County Down Railway mentions Neill's Hill a few times in his book, "Back in Steam. The Downpatrick and County Down Railway from 1982". A few are detailed here: "I was born within the sound and smell of the Belfast & County Down Railway (BCDR), about half a mile from the Neill's Hill railway station in East Belfast." "My first encounter with a steam engine at Neill's Hill occurred when I was about two years old." "It would let me off at Neill's Hill station with the ensuing pleasant half mile walk home alongside the railway."
