= G&SWR shipping services =

This page describes the shipping services of the Glasgow and South Western Railway.

== Background ==
The Glasgow and South Western Railway operated a network of railways in the south-west quadrant of Scotland, and in time developed a series of associated piers and shipping routes, chiefly in the Firth of Clyde.

== Passenger ships ==
The G&SWR ran a fleet of passenger steamships on scheduled and excursion services from its various piers and harbours. In 1872 the Greenock and Ayrshire Railway Co bought the second-hand paddle steamer PS Marquis of Bute, dating from 1868. In 1891, the G&SWR took her over and bought five more second-hand steamers. Three of them came from the fleet of Captain Alexander Williamson: PS Sultan (launched in 1861); PS Sultana (launched in 1868) and PS Viceroy (launched in 1875). The others were PS Chancellor and PS Scotia (both launched in 1880).

Thereafter the G&SWR had various Clyde shipyards build new steamers to order. PS Glen Sannox was launched in 1892. PS Neptune and PS Mercury, who were sisters, were also launched that year. PS Minerva (1893) and her near-sister PS Glen Rosa were launched in 1893. With the delivery of the new ships the company sold Sultan in 1892 and Scotia in 1893. PS Jupiter was launched in 1896, the company sold Sultana in 1897 and PS Juno was launched in 1898 The company sold Chancellor in 1901 and PS Mars was launched in 1902 In 1904 the company bought a second-hand paddle-steamer, PS Vulcan (launched in 1897) and sold Marquis of Bute.

In 1901 the Parsons Marine Steam Turbine Company, shipbuilder William Denny and Brothers and passenger steamer operator Captain John Williamson formed the Turbine Steamer Syndicate. The G&SWR supported Williamson by guaranteeing his overdraft. The syndicate introduced the World's first turbine steamer, TS King Edward, which was launched that year. Denny built her, Parsons supplied her machinery and Williamson operated her on the River Clyde and Firth of Clyde. Despite this early involvement, it was not until 1906 that the G&SWR got a turbine steamer of its own, TS Atalanta, launched that year by John Brown and Company. After that the G&SWR sold Viceroy in 1907 and sold Vulcan back to her previous owner in 1908.

In the First World War, paddle steamers were found suitable for service as auxiliary minesweepers so the Admiralty requisitioned most of the G&SWR's fleet for war service. The steamers' names were changed because the Royal Navy already had warships bearing many of their original names. In 1917 two were lost on active service. In April Neptune, serving as HMS Nepaulin, was sunk by a mine and in November Mars, serving as HMS Marsa, sank as a result of a collision off Harwich. Minerva survived the war but did not return to the G&SWR. She remained with the Admiralty until April 1920 and was sold to new owners in Turkey in 1924.
