= Comber Greenway =

Cycle/footpath east of Belfast, Northern Ireland

Coordinates: 54.6010°N 5.8967°W

The Comber Greenway is a 7-mile (11 km) traffic-free section of the National Cycle Network that runs along the old Belfast-Comber railway line. The cycle path starts on Dee Street in east Belfast and finishes at Comber in County Down. As well as a cycling path, it is also popular with people on foot. The most recent addition to the route was in November 2008 when the final link between Old Dundonald Road/Comber Rd junction and Comber was opened. This added 1.6 miles (2.6 km) to the route. One section runs through a SLNCI-designated Wetland ecosystem.

== Route ==
The traffic-free route starts at Dee Street in East Belfast and passes the C. S. Lewis statue at the Holywood Arches, along the Bloomfield Walkway to Sandown Road where it continues past the PSNI headquarters to a newly installed toucan crossing at the Knock Road.

From here it goes to Kings Road and on to Abbey Road, through Tullycarnet and Ardcarn to East Link Road in Dundonald. The Hanwood Centre and East Point Entertainment Village sit in front of the Greenway along this point.

It continues through a wetland area emerging at the Comber Road, Dundonald where there is a toucan crossing.

The route continues from Comber Road, Dundonald past the Billy Neill Centre for Soccer Excellence where the former railway line passes near the Enler River. Walkers and cyclists can cross the River Enler and farm lanes by a series of reinstated bridges before reaching its end at Belfast Road, Comber.

On its route the Greenway passes through former Belfast and County Down Railway stations at Bloomfield, Neill's Hill, Knock and Dundonald before finishing just short of Comber station.

== History ==
The current route of the Greenway was originally the main line of the Belfast and County Down Railway. The railway was in use from 1850s until 1950 when the Ulster Transport Authority closed it. Through the 1950s the track was lifted in phases and infrastructure, including bridges, removed. The remains of Neill's Hill station survive near Sandown Road behind Clara Park and Sandhill Gardens.

In 1964 it was proposed that a section of what is now the Greenway be utilised for the M7 Motorway project. This motorway was not built. The Belfast Urban Area Plan 2001 included a proposal for a smaller-scale road along the same route, but that was never built either.

By late in the century the Greenway had become a recreation path for walkers, cyclists etc. In 2003–04 the Knock Valley Relief Sewer was installed from Ballymacarett to Dundonald resulting in substantial excavation along the path. Subsequently a number of government agencies contributed funds to upgrade the Greenway with a modern hard surface, road crossings and, with the opening of the section alongside Police Headquarters, a continuous route from inner Belfast to Comber. It was officially opened on 8 November 2008.

== EWAY proposal ==
As part of the Belfast Metropolitan Transport Plan 2015 published in November 2004, a rapid transport scheme was proposed for three routes in Belfast. The route to the east of the city, dubbed EWAY, proposed utilising the Greenway for either a light rail or bus link for Belfast.

Consultants Atkins and KPMG subsequently completed a preliminary assessment of the proposals. Key conclusions include the preference for bus over light rail on cost grounds and the construction of much of the route along the Greenway.

There is political support for the rapid transit but the EWAY route is contentious. A campaign group was formed to oppose EWAY using the Greenway and wants it rerouted along Upper Newtownards Road and increased public consultation. In October 2011 it was announced that EWAY would not include the Comber Greenway in its route.

== Legacy ==
Van Morrison refers to the path in his song Cyprus Avenue, in the song he mentions "walking by the railroad with my cherry, cherry wine".

The Comber Greenway Campaign is community group that look to improve the greenway. They fought a proposal against turning the Greenway into a rapid bus route. They organised a "Enough is Enough" march and protest in November 2019 against dog poisonings that had occurred along the Greenway when dog food spiked with anti-freeze was found and ingested, resulting in the deaths of dogs.
