= St Colman's High and Sixth Form College =

Coordinates: 54.4045°N 5.8875°W

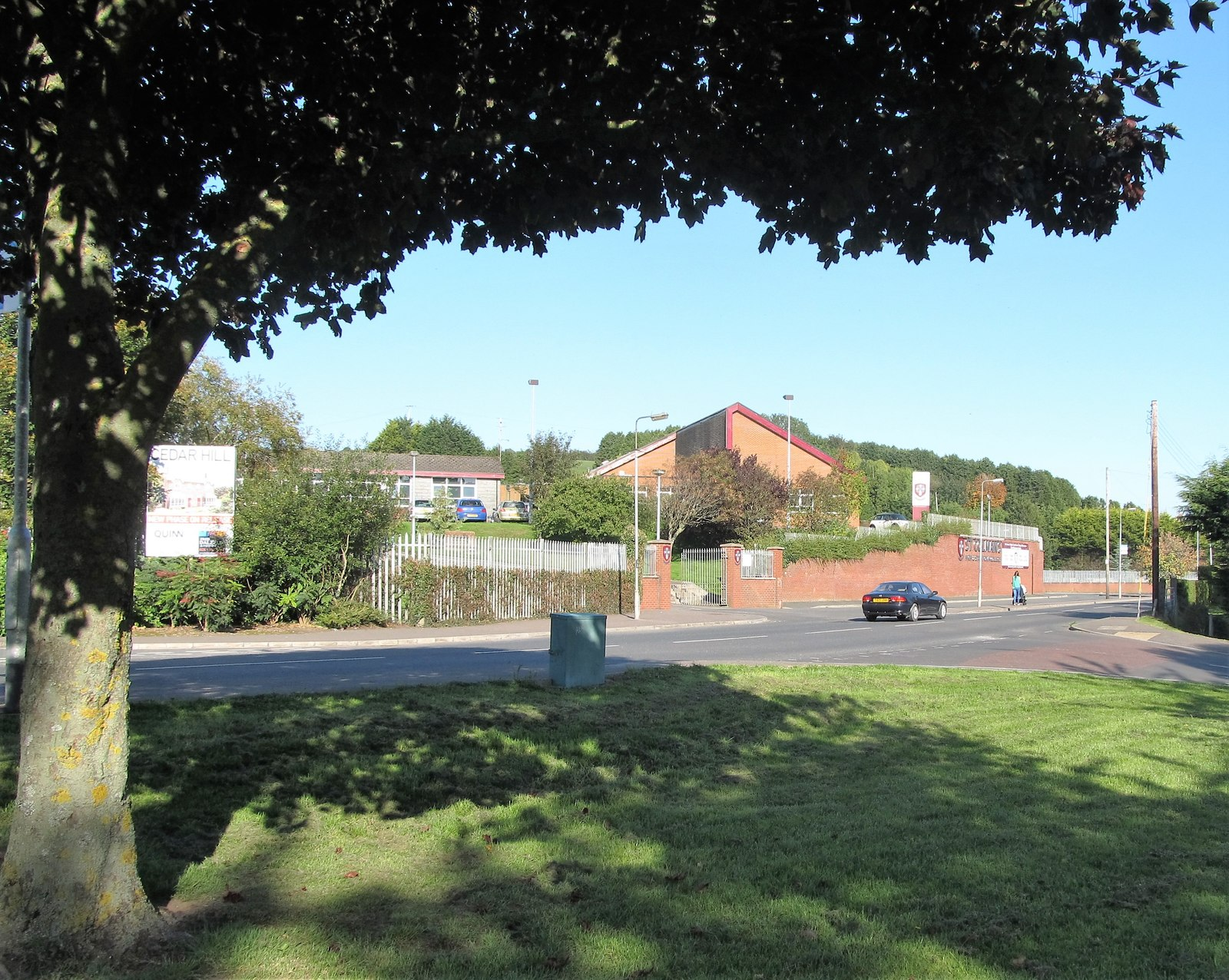
- School crest St Colman's High School and Sixth Form College in 2015

Location
- 52 Crossgar Road; Ballynahinch, County Down, BT125 8XS; Northern Ireland

Information
- Type: 11–18 Secondary School
- Religious affiliation: Roman Catholic
- Local authority: Education Authority (South Eastern)
- Principal: Jennifer King
- Gender: Boys and girls
- Age: 11 to 18
- Enrolment: 550 (as of 2025)
- Colour
- Website: www.stcolmans.co.uk

St. Colman's High and Sixth Form College is an 11–18 Roman Catholic co-educational secondary school situated in Ballynahinch, County Down, Northern Ireland. The schools catchment area includes Ballynahinch Crossgar, Dromara, Downpatrick, Castlewellan, Loughinisland, Lisburn and Belfast. As of 2025, the school had a total of 550 pupils enrolled, and consistently ranks amongst the top 20 non-selective schools across the South Eastern Education Authority for academic attainment.

== History ==
The college was established in 1965 as St. Colman's Secondary School. As it grew in size and the range of courses offered its name was changed to St. Colman's High and Sixth Form College. Although the college is formally Catholic it welcomes students from many different faiths including Baptist, Church of Ireland, Congregational, Methodist, Presbyterian, Seventh Day Adventist and other Christian Churches.

== Overview ==
=== Academics ===
The school provides instruction in a range of academic subjects besides the core subjects English, Maths and Science. At Key Stage 3 these include Geography, Drama, Technology & Design, ICT, History, Home Economics, Music, Irish, Art & Design, Spanish. At Sixth form level, students have a wide range of options including Agriculture & Land Use, Business, Computing, Art & Design, Biology, Chemistry, Drama, Economics, English Literature, French, Irish, Spanish, Maths, Geography, Government & Politics, Psychology, Sociology and Religious Studies. Some of these options are taken in conjunction with Assumption Grammar School. The students can also take BTECs in Applied Science, Construction, Horticulture and Vehicle Technology.

In 2018, the college was placed in the top ten of non-selective schools in Northern Ireland with 92% of Year 12 students securing at least 5 A* to C grades and 82% of Year 12 securing Grade C or above in 7 subjects. The college is a member of the Ballynahinch Area Learning Community, a consortium of local schools. In September 2024, the schools principal, Jennifer King, said that if she "were to look at the ethos of the school, relationships would be the key to the school’s success", further adding "that’s not something that happens by accident". Since introducing A level qualifications in the 1990s, the school has implemented an "agile curriculum" which allows pupils to access more subjects whilst promoting academic and vocational education routes.

=== School crest ===
During the creation of a new school crest, it aspired to create a design which "encapsulated" the "various pathways taken by Sixth Year students". During the development of the new crest, terminology used to describe the school’s identity were explored, falling into two categories which were industry and values. The key components of the crest consist of a shield and Latin scroll, Christian cross, blades of a windmill, glass leading and a flower. The crest displays the schools Latin motto, Facta Non Verba (English: Deeds Not Words).

=== Attainment ===
Between 2021 and 2023, St Colman's High consistently reached over 90% in the number of pupils attaining 5 GCSE qualifications at A*–C. In 2021, the number of pupils attaining 5 GCSE, including English and Maths, at grades A*–C was 75%, before falling slightly to 69% the following year. By 2023, the percentage increased, with 70% of pupils attaining in this area. Attainment figures based on the number of pupils attaining 7 GCSE qualifications, including English and Maths, at grades A*–C in 2021 stood at 74% with a decrease to 62% the following year, before rising to 70% in 2023.

Attainment based on pupil performance at A level qualifications, achieving 2 A*–C grades in 2021 stood at 84%, increasing to 89% the following year. By 2023, it had fallen to 86% of pupils. In the same category, pupils attaining 3 A*–C grades at Level A in 2021 was 56%, however, by 2023, this had fallen to only 47% of pupils across the school. When comparing the percentage of pupils who passed all examinations entered at A Level, 96% passed all qualifications in 2021, whilst 94% and 100% achieved a pass in all qualifications at A Level in 2022 and 2023 respectively.

The number of pupils achieving five or more GCSE qualifications, or equivalents, between grades A*-C remains above the national average across Northern Ireland.

=== Associated primaries ===
As of 2025, St Colman's High has 38 affiliated primary schools, ranging from as far as the city of Belfast, Ardglass, Newcastle, Saintfield and Ballygowan.

== Principals ==
- Mr Harry Bent
- Mr Hugh Graham
- Mr Francis Duffy
- Mr Hugh McCann
- Mr Mark Morgan
- Mrs Jennifer King

== See also ==
- List of secondary schools in Northern Ireland
