= Dundonald railway station =

Railway station in County Down, Northern Ireland

Coordinates: 54.5867°N 5.8014°W

Dundonald
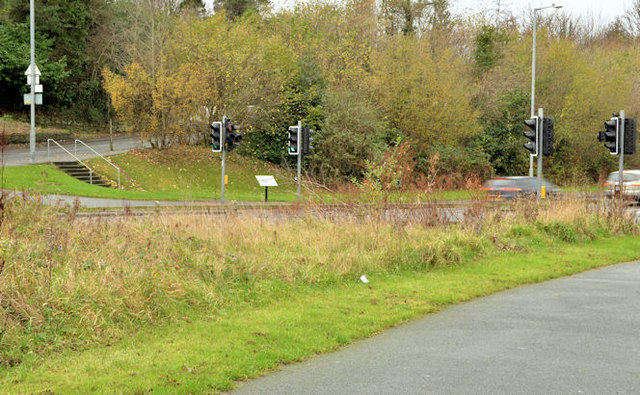
- The current site of where Dundonald station was, now part of the Comber Greenway.

General information
- Location: Old Dundonald Road; Dundonald, County Down; Northern Ireland

Other information
- Status: Demolished

History
- Original company: Belfast and County Down Railway

Key dates
- 6 May 1850: Station opens
- 24 April 1950: Station closes
Location

Dundonald railway station was a station in Dundonald, County Down on the Belfast and County Down Railway which ran from Belfast to Newcastle in Northern Ireland.

== History ==
The station was opened by the Belfast and County Down Railway on 6 May 1850. It was located 4 miles 78 chains (8.0 km) from Belfast Queen's Quay. The station was closed on 24 April 1950, (just under a month off of exactly 100 years of service) by which time it had been taken over by the Ulster Transport Authority. The station buildings were demolished following the removal of the line. Today the site of the station is now on the Comber Greenway that runs on part of the old railway from Belfast to Comber.

== Routes ==
Preceding station	Historical railways	Following station
Knock	Belfast and County Down Railway; Belfast-Newcastle	Comber
