= Fraser Street Halt =

General information
- Coordinates: 54.602119°N 5.904820°W
Location

Fraser Street Halt is a closed railway station in Belfast which was part of the Belfast and County Down Railway system.

The station opened on 1 July 1935 and closed on 16 January 1950. It has been mentioned as early as 1928, in that there would be a stop to serve a train from Donaghadee for the workers at the shipyards and engineering works.

Preceding station	Historical railways	Following station
Belfast Queen's Quay	Belfast and County Down Railway; Belfast-Downpatrick-Newcastle	Bloomfield
