= Ballyhackamore =

Suburb of Belfast, Northern Ireland

Coordinates: 54.595°N 5.868°W

Ballyhackamore: Irish: Baile an Chacamair
- Location within County Down
- County: County Down
- Country: Northern Ireland
- Sovereign state: United Kingdom
- Post town: Belfast
- Postcode district: BT4 and BT5
- Dialling code: 028
- Police: Northern Ireland
- Fire: Northern Ireland
- Ambulance: Northern Ireland
- UK Parliament: East Belfast
- NI Assembly: East Belfast

Ballyhackamore (Irish: Baile an Chacamair, meaning 'townland of the slob land or mud flat') is a suburb of Belfast, Northern Ireland. It is in East Belfast, around part of the Upper Newtownards Road. It is also a ward in the East Belfast constituency of the UK Parliament, and a townland of County Down.

The Sunday Times named Ballyhackamore the Brunch Capital of Belfast in a 2018 article on the Best Places to live in Britain. The neighbourhood (often called 'Ballyhack' for short) is the location of several restaurants and cafés as well as a range of local and national shops.

== Transport ==
Ballyhackamore is served by the Translink Glider G1 service. In addition Metro and Ulsterbus services stop here.

== Places of note ==
- Cyprus Avenue a residential street and conservation area which lent its name to the Van Morrison song, Cyprus Avenue
- Neill's Hill railway station a former halt on the Belfast and County Down Railway line.
- Kincora Boys' Home, a home for boys that was the scene of serious organised abuse.
- Bloomfield Collegiate School, an Independent Grammar School for girls.
- Star of the North - Ballyhackamore Loyal Orange Lodge 1053. As of 2026, the lodge has been active for 128 years since 1898

== Notable people ==
- Judith Cochrane, politician, had a constituency office in Ballyhackamore
- Ian Geddes Davidson, Irish rugby union player, born in Ballyhackamore
- Gemma Garrett, former Miss Great Britain, attended Bloomfield Collegiate
- Christine Lampard, TV broadcaster, attended Bloomfield Collegiate
- Joan Lingard, Scottish novelist, grew up and lived in Ballyhackamore until the age of 18
- Naomi Long, leader of the Alliance Party of Northern Ireland, attended Bloomfield Collegiate and lives in Ballyhackamore
- Paddy O'Flaherty, broadcaster and journalist
- Elaine Shemilt, fine art printmaker, attended Bloomfield Collegiate

== In popular culture ==
- Ballyhackamore – "Town of the big horses”, an NVTV television programme
- Cyprus Avenue, a Van Morrison song

== Sport ==
Bloomfield Football Club are historically linked to Ballyhackamore, as they were previously known as 24th Old Boys, who would meet in Ballyhackamore Presbyterian Church. They play in the Northern Amateur Football League, and have won the Cochrane Corry Cup and multiple division league championships.

In dodgeball, Ballyhackamore Dodgeball Club has the most successful men's and women's teams. They are governed by British Dodgeball and play in the Northern Irish Super League. The men's team is nicknamed the Ballyhackamore Barbarians, and the women's team is known as the Ballyhackamore Amazonians. They won their respective leagues in 2025, marking a league double for the suburb.
