= PS Slieve Bearnagh =

History
- Name: PS Slieve Bearnagh (1893–1915 or 1917); HMS Slieve Bearnagh (1915 or 1917–19); HC5 (1919)
- Namesake: Slieve Bearnagh in County Down; "Hospital Carrier 5" (1919)
- Owner: Belfast and County Down Railway (1894–1912); D&J Nicol (1912–23)
- Operator: B&CDR (1894–1912); D&J Nichol (1912–15 or –17); Royal Navy (from 1915 or 1917)
- Port of registry: (United Kingdom); (United Kingdom)
- Ordered: October 1893
- Builder: J&G Thomson
- Yard number: 268
- Launched: 21 November 1893 or 21 March 1894
- In service: 1 May 1894
- Fate: Scrapped 1923

General characteristics
- Type: passenger ferry
- Tonnage: 383 GRT
- Length: 225 ft (69 m); or 225.6 ft (68.8 m)
- Beam: 26 ft (7.9 m); or 26.1 ft (8.0 m)
- Draught: 9 ft (2.7 m)
- Propulsion: side paddles powered by two compound diagonal steam engines.
- Capacity: 958 passengers Belfast — Bangor; 871 passengers Belfast — Larne

PS Slieve Bearnagh was a United Kingdom passenger paddle steamer that in later years was called HC5. J&G Thomson launched her in 1893 or 1894 for the Belfast and County Down Railway (B&CDR). In 1912 she was sold to D&J Nicol of Dundee. Around the end of the First World War she served with the Royal Navy as hospital carrier ship HC5. She was scrapped in 1923.

== With the B&CDR ==
J&G Thomson of Clydebank built the ship for the B&CDR, who named her Slieve Bearnagh after the second highest peak in the Mourne Mountains in County Down. Sources disagree as to whether she was launched on 21 November 1893 or 21 March 1894. She made her trial run on Belfast Lough on 1 May 1894

In the spring of 1893 Thomson had built the slightly smaller steamer PS Slieve Donard for the B&CDR. In May 1894 Slieve Bearnagh joined Slieve Donard on the company's regular steamship route between Belfast and Bangor, for which the scheduled journey time was 55 minutes.

Between them the two ships made six sailings per day from Belfast to Bangor from Mondays to Saturdays and a similar number back to Belfast. There were five sailings on Sundays, and from Mondays to Saturdays one sailing per day extended beyond Bangor to Donaghadee. On Saturday afternoons other sailings continued from Bangor across Belfast Lough to Larne.

The railway sold Donard in 1899 but kept Bearnagh until 1912. She occasionally made excursions to Portaferry on the Ards Peninsula, Ardglass in south Down, and Larne and Portrush on the coast of County Antrim in addition to her regular scheduled route on Belfast Lough.

The Board of Trade certificated Slieve Bearnagh to carry 958 passengers along the coast between Belfast and Bangor or 871 passengers on the more open sea voyage between Belfast and Larne. A report by the B&CDR's General Manager records that in November 1904 her Master, Captain McCorquodale, was summonsed for overloading the ship.

At the end of the 1911 summer season the B&CDR ordered a replacement ship for £24,000 and put Slieve Bearnagh up for sale for £12,000. No-one offered to buy at that price so the railway reduced it to £10,000 by the end of 1911 and later to £7,000. The replacement ship, the slightly larger PS Erin's Isle, was launched on 12 June 1912, and finally on 19 June 1912 Slieve Bearnagh was sold for only £4,350.

== With D&J Nicol ==
Slieve Bearnagh' buyer was D&J Nicol of Dundee on the east coast of Scotland, with whom she became the largest pleasure steamer on the Firth of Tay. From Dundee she made various excursions: along the coast of Angus to Arbroath and Montrose, around the Inchcape lighthouse, and across to St Andrews in Fife.

== With the Royal Navy ==
Sources disagree as to when Slieve Bearnagh entered Royal Navy service. The Admiralty may have requisitioned her in 1915, used her as an auxiliary minesweeper and then bought her in October 1917. According to another source the Admiralty did not requisition her until 1917. However, sources agree that in January 1919 she served as hospital carrier ship HC5.

Slieve Bearnagh was scrapped at Inverkeithing in Fife on 7 June 1923.

== Sources ==
- McCutcheon, W.A. (1980). The Industrial Archaeology of Northern Ireland. Belfast: HMSO. p. 149. ISBN 0337081549.
- Patterson, E.M. (1982) [1958]. Belfast and County Down Railway. Newton Abbott: David & Charles. pp. 13–14. ISBN 071538306X.
