= Creevyargon Halt railway station =

Railway station in County Down, Northern Ireland

Coordinates: 54.414335°N 5.862536°W

Creevyargon Halt

General information
- Location: County Down; Northern Ireland

Other information
- Status: Disused

History
- Original company: Belfast and County Down Railway
- Pre-grouping: Belfast and County Down Railway
- Post-grouping: Belfast and County Down Railway

Key dates
- 1 November 1930: Station opens
- 16 January 1950: Station closes
Location

Creevyargon Halt railway station was on the Belfast and County Down Railway which ran from Belfast to Ballynahinch in Northern Ireland.

== History ==
The station was opened by the Belfast and County Down Railway on 1 November 1930.

The station closed to passengers in 1950, by which time it had been taken over by the Ulster Transport Authority.

Preceding station	Historical railways	Following station
Ballynahinch Junction	Belfast and County Down Railway; Belfast-Ballynahinch	Ballynahinch
