= Ballygrainey railway station =

Railway station in County Down, Northern Ireland

Coordinates: 54.632828°N 5.630815°W

Ballygrainey

General information
- Location: Ballygrainey, County Down; Northern Ireland

Other information
- Status: Disused

History
- Original company: Belfast and County Down Railway
- Pre-grouping: Belfast and County Down Railway
- Post-grouping: Belfast and County Down Railway

Key dates
- 3 June 1861: Station opens
- 24 April 1950: Station closes
Location

Ballygrainey railway station was on the Belfast and County Down Railway which ran from Belfast to Donaghadee in Northern Ireland.

== History ==
The station was opened by the Belfast and County Down Railway on 3 June 1861 as 'Groomsport & Bangor'. It was later renamed 'Groomsport Road' and finally 'Ballygrainey'.

The station closed to passengers in 1950, by which time it had been taken over by the Ulster Transport Authority.

Preceding station	Historical railways	Following station
Conlig	Belfast and County Down Railway; Belfast-Donaghadee	Millisle Road Halt
