= Bloomfield railway station =

Former railway station in Belfast, Northern Ireland

General information
- Coordinates: 54.594972°N 5.883056°W
- Distance: 1 mile 40 chains (2.4 km) from Belfast

History
- Opened: 12 May 1879
- Closed: 24 April 1950
Location

Bloomfield railway station was part of the Belfast and County Down Railway's main line from Belfast to Comber. The station opened 12 May 1879 and closed on 24 April 1950. It was located 1 mile 40 chains (2.4 km) from Belfast Queen's Quay.

| Preceding station | Historical railways | Following station |
|---|---|---|
| Fraser Street Halt | Belfast and County Down Railway; Belfast-Downpatrick-Newcastle-Ardglass | Neill's Hill |
