= Craigavad railway station =

Railway station in County Down, Northern Ireland

Coordinates: 54.65544°N 5.79225°W

Craigavad railway station was a railway station in the townland of Ballygrainey on the Belfast, Holywood and Bangor Railway until it was absorbed by the Belfast and County Down Railway in 1884, the line ran from Queen's Quay station to Bangor railway station in Northern Ireland and was located 6.7 miles (10.8 km) from the Queen's Quay terminus.

== History ==
The station was opened by the Belfast, Holywood and Bangor Railway on 1 May 1865.

The station closed to passengers in 1957 and was reopened in 1960 but later closed for good in 1961.

Preceding station	Historical railways	Following station
Cultra halt	Belfast, Holywood and Bangor Railway; Belfast-Bangor	Helen's Bay
