= Knock railway station =

Railway station in County Down, Northern Ireland

Coordinates: 54.590578°N 5.855541°W

Knock
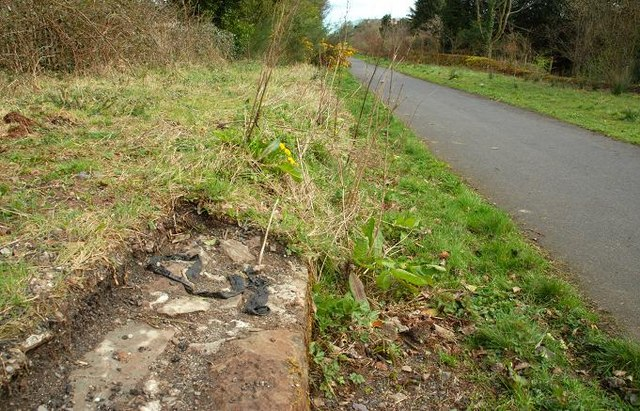

General information
- Location: Knock, Belfast, County Down; Northern Ireland

Other information
- Status: Disused

History
- Original company: Belfast and County Down Railway
- Pre-grouping: Belfast and County Down Railway
- Post-grouping: Belfast and County Down Railway

Key dates
- 6 May 1850: Station opens
- 24 April 1950: Station closes
Location

Knock railway station was on the Belfast and County Down Railway which ran from Belfast to Newcastle, County Down in Northern Ireland.

== History ==
The station was opened by the Belfast and County Down Railway on 6 May 1850.

It was originally called Ballycloghan Halt, named after the neighbouring townland.

It gradually built up the number of trains it handled on a daily basis, with 2 a day in 1852, 4 a day in 1861 and 6 a day in 1868.

In 1869, the temporary booking office was replaced by proper brick station buildings and the halt's name was changed to Knock Station.

The platforms were 645 feet long and could be accessed from the King's Road via paths sloping down on either side of the track.

The station closed to passengers on 24 April 1950, by which time it had been taken over by the Ulster Transport Authority.

The former track bed now forms part of the Comber Greenway.

Preceding station	Historical railways	Following station
Neill's Hill	Belfast and County Down Railway; Belfast-Newcastle	Dundonald
