= Comber railway station =

Station on the Belfast and County Down Railway mainline, Northern Ireland

Coordinates: 54.551576°N 5.754529°W

Comber
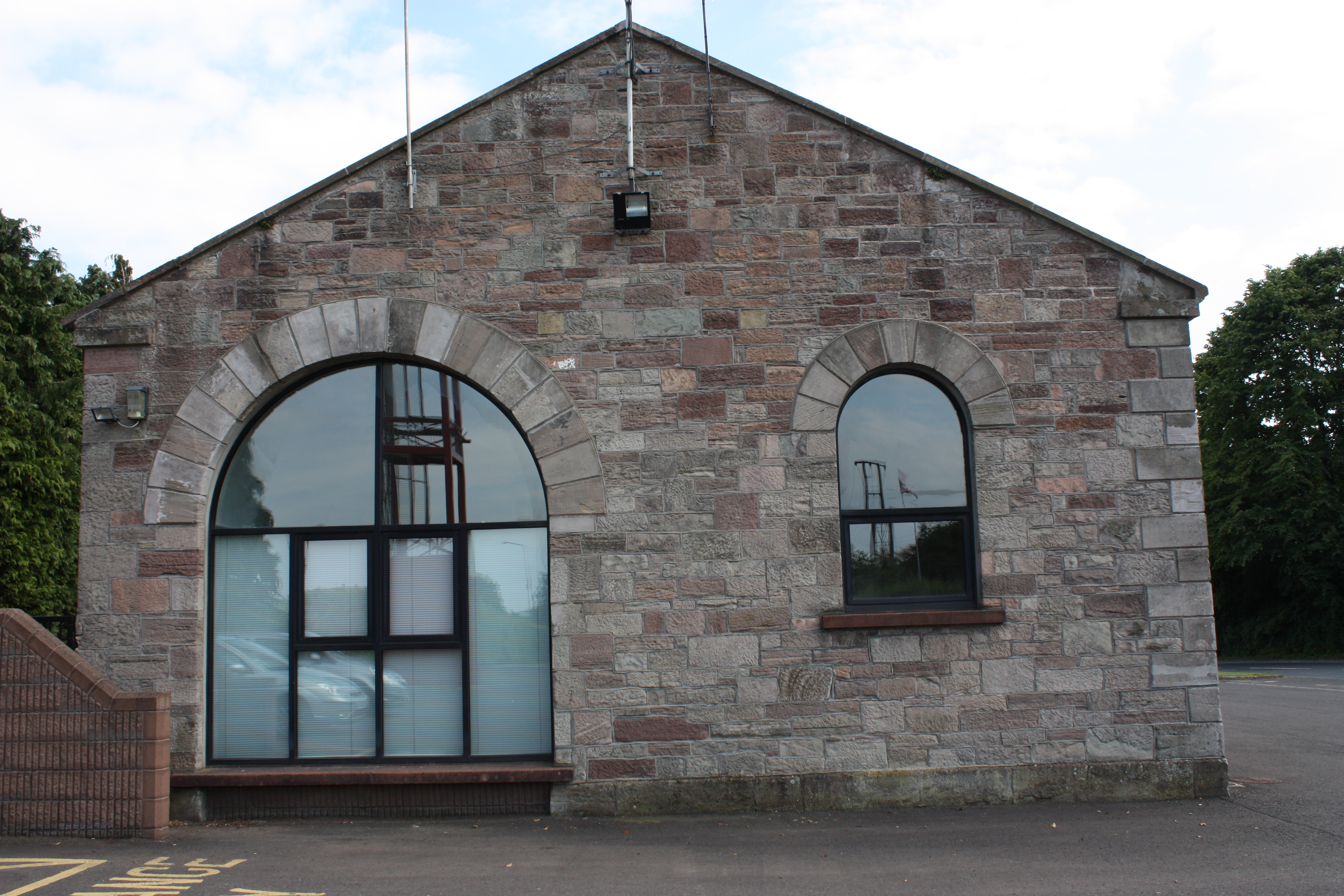
- In the current guise as a Fire Station with Northern Ireland Fire and Rescue Service.

General information
- Location: Glen Road; Comber, County Down; Northern Ireland

Other information
- Status: Disused

History
- Original company: Belfast and County Down Railway
- Pre-grouping: Belfast and County Down Railway
- Post-grouping: Belfast and County Down Railway

Key dates
- 6 May 1850: Station opens
- 24 April 1950: Station closes
Location

Comber railway station was on the Belfast and County Down Railway which ran from Belfast to Newcastle in Northern Ireland.

== History ==
The station was opened by the Belfast and County Down Railway on 6 May 1850 as the penultimate station on the original single-track line to Newtownards. With the opening of the branch to Ballygowan and Downpatrick in 1858, it became a junction station. The Newtownards branch was eventually extended to Donaghadee and the Downpatrick line to Newcastle.

The station closed to passengers in 1950, by which time it had been taken over by the Ulster Transport Authority. The station buildings, with the exception of the goods shed, were demolished and a section of the trackbed running through the station relaid as the A22 bypass. Today the former engine shed is now used as the Comber Fire Station, while part of the old railway north of the town to Belfast is now the Comber Greenway.

== Routes ==
Preceding station	Historical railways	Following station
Dundonald	Belfast and County Down Railway; Belfast-Newcastle	Ballygowan
Terminus	Belfast and County Down Railway; Donaghadee Branch Line	Newtownards
