= Tullycarnet =

Area of eastern Belfast, Northern Ireland

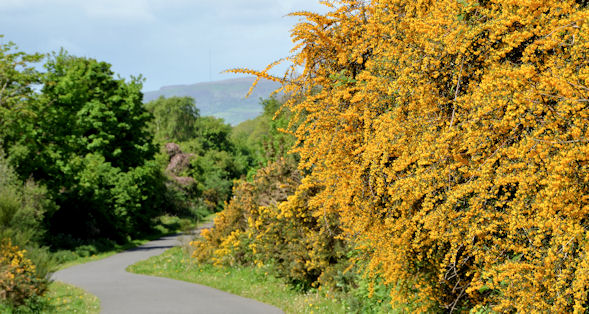
The Comber Greenway, a recreational cycling and walking path through east Belfast, passes through Tullycarnet

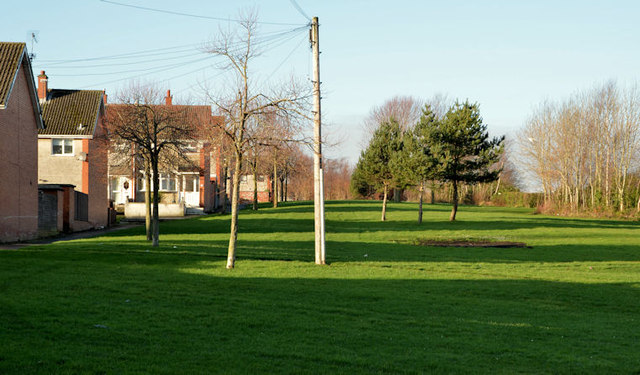
Housing and greenspace in Tullycarnet

Tullycarnet is an area of east Belfast, Northern Ireland. It is a built-up area, mostly residential, that lies around 7 kilometres (4.3 mi) to the east of Belfast City Hall. It borders Dundonald to the west, and the main thoroughfare is Kings Road.

== Name ==
The name "Tullycarnet" is from the Irish Tulaigh Charnáin ("hillock of the little cairn"). It is not known where the original cairn was.

== Amenties and sport ==
Local facilities include the Comber Greenway (a long cycle/recreational path through east Belfast), a public library, Tullycarnet Park, and Tullycarnet Community Centre (hosting a number of leisure activities). Tullycarnet F.C., an association football club named for the area, entered the Northern Amateur Football League in 2011.
