= Ballynahinch Market House =

Municipal Building in Ballynahinch, Northern Ireland

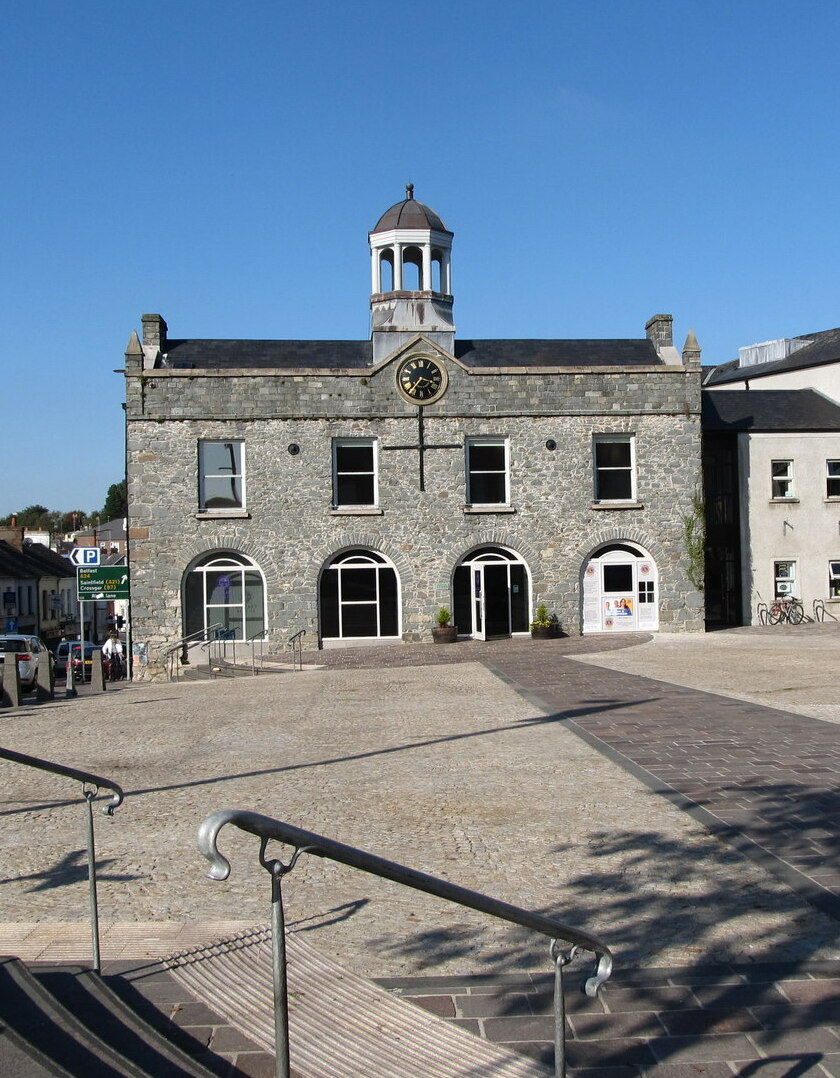
- Ballynahinch Market House

- Shown in Northern Ireland
- 54.4022°N 5.8973°W
- Location: Market Square, Ballynahinch

History
- Built: 1795

Site notes
- Architectural style: Neoclassical style

Listed Building – Grade B1
- Official name: Old Court House, AKA Former market house, The Square, Ballynahinch, County Down
- Designated: 11 February 1980
- Reference no.: HB 18/07/005

Ballynahinch Market House, formerly known as Ballynahinch Court House and as Ballynahinch Town Hall, is a municipal structure in the Market Square, Ballynahinch, County Down, Northern Ireland. The structure, which is used as a community events venue, is a Grade B1 listed building.

== History ==
The building was commissioned by the Earl of Moira, whose seat was at Moira Castle, as a covered market for the local people. The foundation stone for the new building was laid by representatives of the local masonic lodge on 2 July 1792. It was designed in the neoclassical style, built in rubble masonry and was completed in 1795. The design involved a symmetrical main frontage with four bays facing onto the Market Square; it was arcaded on the ground floor, so that markets could be held, with an assembly room on the first floor. There were four irregular openings with on the ground floor and four sash windows with window cills on the first floor. At roof level, there was a parapet, a central pediment and pinnacles at each end.

In June 1798, a group of United Irishmen, led by Henro Munro, were exposed to a barrage of musketry and artillery fire outside the building in the Market Square in what became known as the Battle of Ballynahinch. Munro was subsequently taken to Lisburn where he was tried and hanged. In 1802, the building, together with much of the town, was acquired by David Ker, who came to Ballynahinch to "take the waters" from the local medicinal springs. By the 1830s, the building had become dilapidated; it was refurbished in 1841, when a central cupola, in the form of eight columns on a square base supporting a dome, was installed on the roof and a clock, made by James Scott and Sons, was installed in the central pediment.

The assembly room was used as a court room for petty session hearings throughout the 19th century and it was also used as a classroom for lessons in science and technology in the late 19th century.

In May 1935, the Ker family sold the building to William James McCoubrey, who was a local businessman and chairman of Down County Council. McCoubrey converted the ground floor of the building for retail use and the first floor for use as a working men's club. In 1957, he replaced the cupola with a small pyramid-shaped spire and he subsequently infilled the openings at the front of the building with glazing.

In January 2001, a group of local people, the Ballynahinch Regeneration Committee, acquired the building from the McCoubrey family. An extensive programme of refurbishment works, which involved the removal of cement render from the front building, establishing regular openings with voussoirs on the ground floor and the restoration of the cupola in the original style, was completed in 2002. Down District Council then acquired the building for use as a community events venue in August 2010.
