= Ballynahinch, County Down =

Town in County Down, Northern Ireland

Coordinates: 54.395°N 5.886°W

Ballynahinch: Irish: Baile na hInse; Scots: Ba'nahinch
- Town
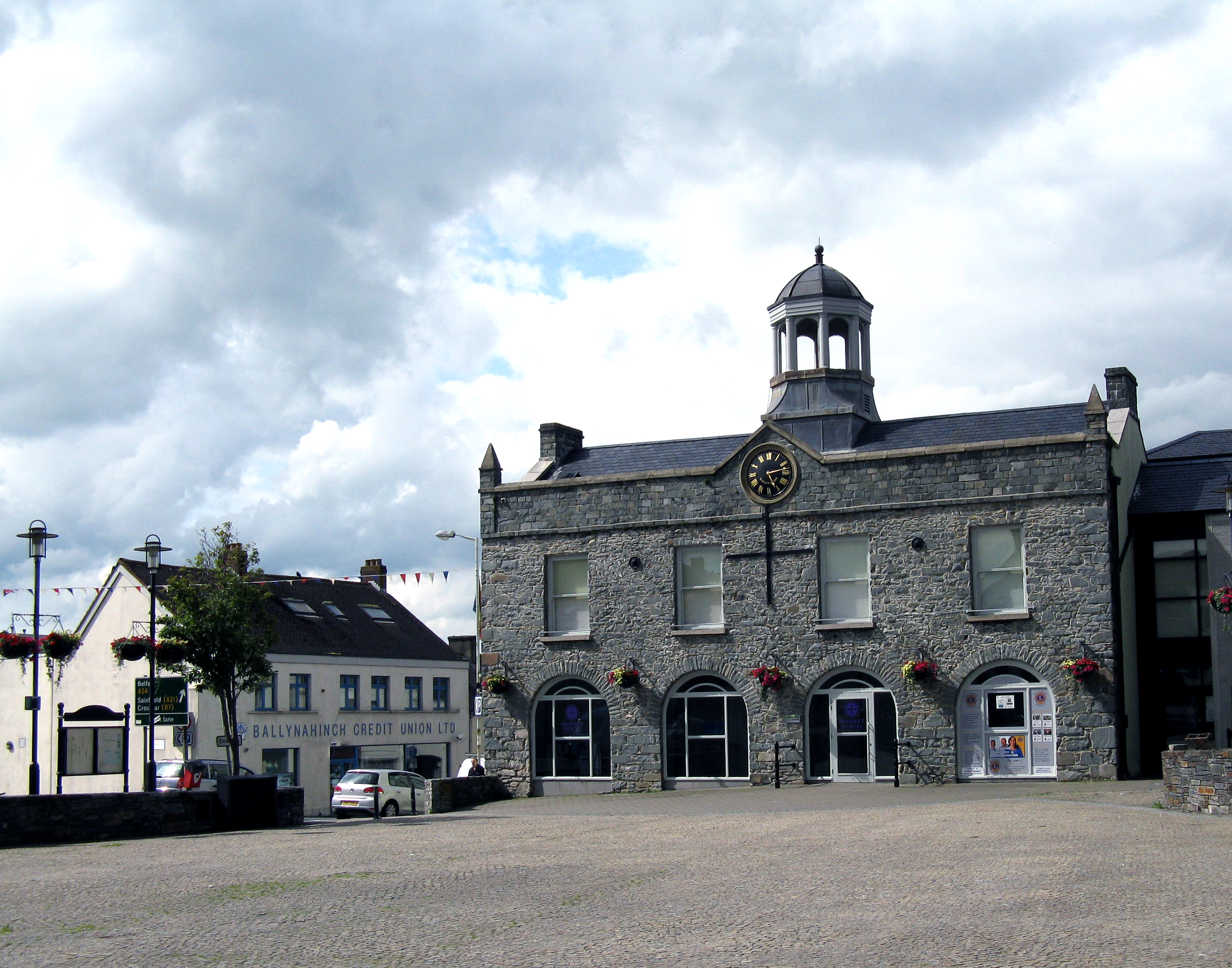
- Ballynahinch Market House (middle) and Credit Union (left)

- Location within County Down
- Population: 6,164 (2021 census)
- District: Newry, Mourne and Down
- County: County Down
- Country: Northern Ireland
- Sovereign state: United Kingdom
- Post town: BALLYNAHINCH
- Postcode district: BT24
- Dialling code: 028
- Police: Northern Ireland
- Fire: Northern Ireland
- Ambulance: Northern Ireland
- UK Parliament: Strangford
- NI Assembly: Strangford

Ballynahinch (from Irish Baile na hInse, meaning 'settlement of the island/water-meadow') is a market town in County Down, Northern Ireland. It is 14 miles (23 km) south of Belfast city centre, the town lies on the main A24 road from Belfast to Clough, near Newcastle. It had a population of 6,164 people in the 2021 census.

Ballynahinch hosts a market that still takes place in the square every Thursday. Facilities in the town include a leisure centre. In recent years a regeneration committee has been formed for the development of the town and the surrounding Spa and Drumaness areas.

== History ==
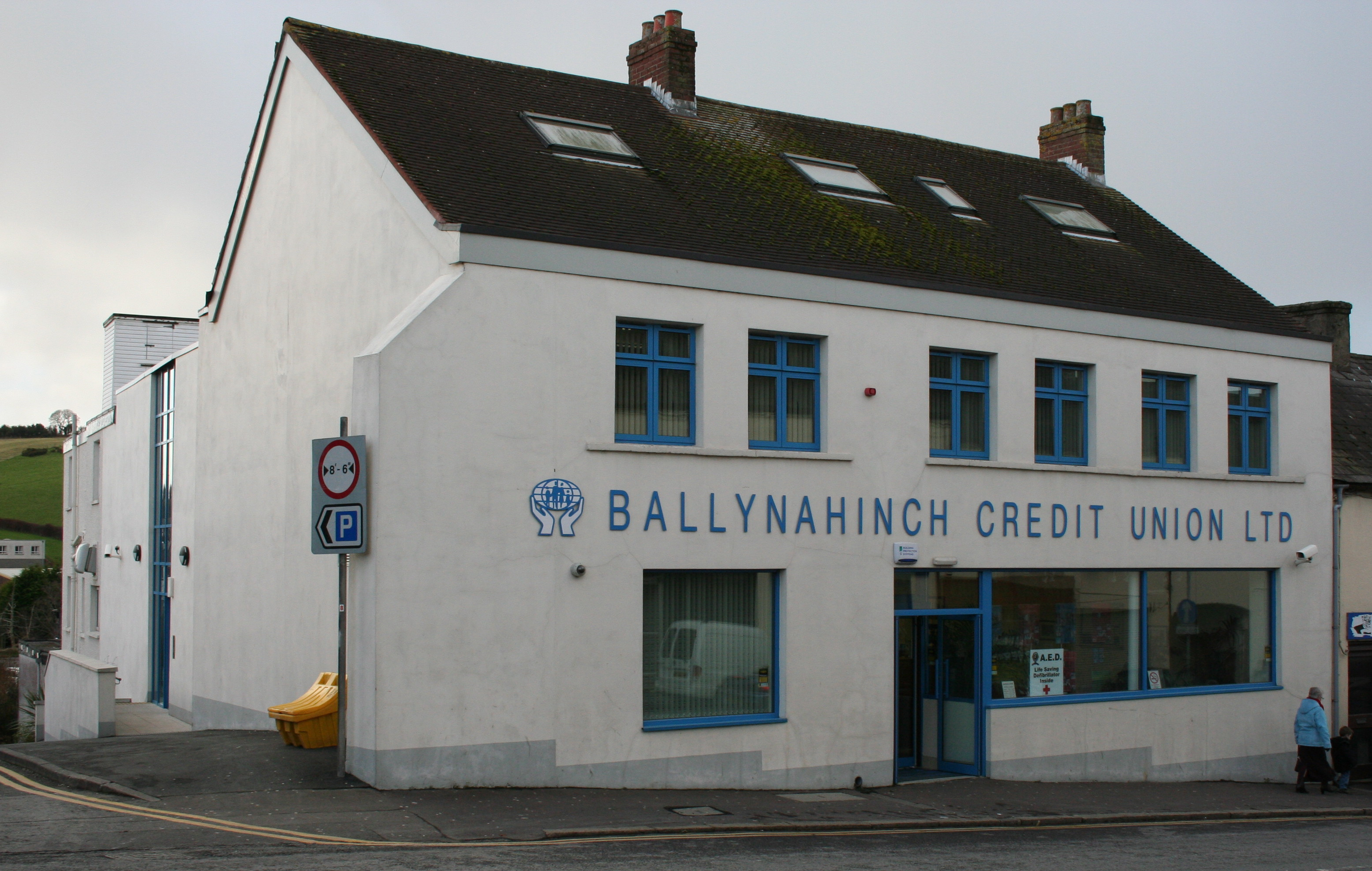
The credit union in Ballynahinch

Before the 17th century, the area around Ballynahinch was controlled by the McCartan clan. During the Wars of the Three Kingdoms, Catholic military officer Patrick McCartan captured a Parliamentarian-controlled castle in Downpatrick. After he was captured, McCartan was executed in 1653 and his lands were confiscated by the Parliamentarian authorities and sold to Sir George Rawdon, an associate of Sir William Petty. Prior to his death in 1678, Petty leased his interest in the former McCartan lands purchased by Rawdon, leaving the latter in sole possession of the estate; Rawdon subsequently ordered the construction of two gristmills on the estate and established the town of Ballynahinch, which was founded with a market square. In 1683, King Charles II granted a royal patent to Ballynahinch allowing it the right to open the market square on Thursdays and hold two fairs every 1 February and 29 June.

Settlers from lowland Scotland increased the population and Ballynahinch grew as a market town with the sale of livestock, corn, potatoes and increasingly, flax was being cultivated. Sir John Rawdon, descendant of Sir George and now the Earl of Moira took up residence in Montalto house in Ballynahinch. He made significant improvements to the estate and to the town by promoting the linen market and causing Ballynahinch Market House to be built. By the end of the eighteenth century sales in the market were grossing around £300 per week and the town was prospering.

The Society of United Irishmen launched a rebellion in 1798. It began in Leinster and quickly spread to Ulster. The United Irishmen had been founded in 1791 by liberal Protestants in Belfast. Its goal was to unite Catholics and Protestants and make Ireland an independent republic. Although its membership was mainly Catholic, many of its leaders and members in northeast Ulster were Protestant. The Battle of Ballynahinch began on 12 June 1798, when about 4,000 United Irishmen stationed at Ballynahinch were attacked by a government force led by George Nugent. Nugent's forces bombarded the town with cannon for a full day until the United Irishmen retreated. Following this, the victorious troops burnt sixty-three houses in Ballynahinch and its hinterland. The commander of the United Irishmen, Henry Munro, was betrayed, captured and executed shortly after.

Montalto and Ballynahinch was sold in 1802 to David Ker Esq. who took advantage of the rising fashion for 'taking the waters' amongst tourists with money and developed the medicinal spa wells just over two miles outside the town. The village continued to expand thereafter. In mid-1920, the Royal Irish Constabulary (RIC) barracks at Ballynahinch was subject to a bomb attack by the Irish Republican Army (IRA). On 16 October 1986 Terence Mullan age 31 and Kathleen Mullan age 79, both Catholic civilians, were shot dead by the Ulster Freedom Fighters at their home, Dromore Road, Ballynahinch. Then British Prime Minister John Major visited Ballynahinch in December 1996. Ballynahinch is the site of Montalto Estate, Montalto House and The Carriage Rooms. The latter of which was the setting for Disney's The Lodge.

== Built heritage ==
The town's market house was built in 1795 and is now used as a community centre. An old flax mill and corn mill also stand on the outskirts of the town. Ballynahinch Orange Hall was completed in the early 20th century.

Churches in the area include the First Presbyterian Church on Windmill Street. This church has its roots back to the middle of the 17th century with Presbyterians being present in the town from the 1630s. It is believed there was a Presbyterian minister here from 1655. The church building was built in 1751, some 50 years after the first known minister, the Rev William Reid, who was ordained and installed on 14 July 1696. The church is still the largest and oldest ecclesiastical building in the town. Another Presbyterian church, Edengrove Presbyterian Church on Dromore Road, dates from 1841. Ballynahinch Free Presbyterian Church was established in 1978.

St Patrick's Roman Catholic Church, on Church Street in Ballynahinch, was completed in 1812 with the tower and transepts added in the 1860s.

== Demographics ==
Ballynahinch is classified as a small town by the Northern Ireland Statistics and Research Agency (NISRA) (i.e. with population between 4,500 and 10,000).

=== 2021 census ===
On census day in 2021 (21 March 2021), there were 6,164 people living in Ballynahinch. Of these:

- 53.28% belong to or were brought up as Protestants and 34.15% belong to or were brought up as Catholics.
- 57.1% indicated that they had a British national identity, 36.1% had a Northern Irish national identity and 17.3% had an Irish national identity (respondents could indicate more than one national identity).
- 19.73% were aged under 16 years and 17.85% were aged 65 and over.
- 51.56% of the usually resident population were female and 48.44% were male
- 39 years was the average (median) age of the population.
- 11.03% had some knowledge of Ulster-Scots and 5.40% had some knowledge of Irish (Gaelic).
- 1.51% of people aged 16–74 were unemployed (excluding full time students) or 1.74% including full time students.

=== 2011 census ===
On census day in 2011 (27 March 2011), there were 5,703 people living in Ballynahinch (2,326 households), accounting for 0.31% of the Northern Ireland total and representing an increase of 6.3% on the census 2001 figure of 5,363. Of these:

- 21.01% were aged under 16 years and 16.48% were aged 65 and over.
- 52.27% of the usually resident population were female and 47.73% were male.
- 57.99% belong to or were brought up as Protestants and 34.61% belong to or were brought up as Catholics.
- 62.41% indicated that they had a British national identity, 30.46% had a Northern Irish national identity and 14.29% had an Irish national identity (respondents could indicate more than one national identity).
- 37 years was the average (median) age of the population.
- 6.95% had some knowledge of Ulster-Scots and 4.52% had some knowledge of Irish (Gaelic).
- 4.94% of people aged 16–74 were unemployed.

== Transport ==
=== Traffic congestion ===
The town is well known for its heavy congestion. A bypass is proposed for the town. Geological surveys were conducted over twenty years ago to determine the route of the bypass but money has never been allocated by the Department of the Environment. In the 1990s various traffic control measures were introduced including the present one way system, however all have failed to cope with the sheer volume of traffic which passes through the town daily, particularly evenings.

In January 2012 The Minister for Regional Development made the following announcement:

"Roads Service approved the stage 2 preferred options report for the scheme, including the recommendation for a preferred line for the A24 Ballynahinch bypass scheme around the eastern outskirts and adjacent to the development limit of the town. That line will run from the junction of the A24 Belfast Road and the A21 Saintfield Road, which is north of the town, to the junction of the A24 Drumaness Road and the B2 Downpatrick Road, which is south of the town, at a distance of approximately 3.1 km. The scheme will involve substantial earthworks to traverse the drumlin topography and ground conditions along the route, which includes the flood plain of the Ballynahinch River. Three substantial structures will be required where the route crosses Moss Road, Crossgar Road and the Ballynahinch river."

There will also be a junction with the B7 Crossgar Road.

However this just shows the advanced nature of the planning rather than imminent construction; The official position is still that construction will take place between 2014 and 2019.

=== Rail ===
Ballynahinch railway station and Ballynahinch Junction railway station on the Belfast and County Down Railway, both opened on 10 September 1858, and both finally closed on 16 January 1950.

== Education ==
There are a number of primary schools in the area, including Drumlins Integrated Primary School, Ballynahinch Primary School, Saint Patrick's Primary School and Spa Primary School.

Secondary schools include Assumption Grammar School, the High School Ballynahinch and St Colman's High and Sixth Form College.

At third-level, the South Eastern Regional College has a campus in Ballynahinch.

== Sport ==
Ballynahinch Rugby Football Club, founded 1954, has its home ground at Ballymacarn Park and plays in AIL Division One. Ballynahinch Rabbitohs, a rugby league football club, won a number of consecutive Ulster League titles from 2009 to 2012. They also field a second team in the Ulster second division.

Association football (soccer) clubs in the area include Ballynahinch United F.C., Temple Rangers Football Club and Ballynahinch Olympic FC. Ballynahinch United play in the Northern Amateur Football League and have their home ground at Millbridge on the outskirts of the town. Ballynahinch Olympic FC, founded in 1973, have a Senior side in Division 2A of the Northern Amateur Football League and a Senior side in Division 1 of the Newcastle League with Junior sides in DYFL. Both teams play at Cedar Playing Fields in Crossgar. Temple Rangers Football Club, which fields teams in the Northern Amateur Football League, plays home games at the pitches in the Langley Road estate.

Ballynahinch Hockey club have four sides (men and women first teams, and men's and women's seconds teams) that compete in the Ulster hockey leagues. In 2020, the men's team was relegated from the Ulster Senior League. As of 2026, the men's first team was playing in the Ulster Hockey Junior 6 League Cup.

== Notable people ==
- William Reddick (1812–1885), American politician, was born in Ballynahinch
- Hugh Gourley (1825–1906) emigrated from Ballynahinch aged 27 and was elected Mayor of Dunedin, New Zealand, on two occasions
- John McMullen (1832–1883), born in Ballynahinch, became a Roman Catholic Bishop in Iowa, United States
- Irish international footballer and manager, Frank Thompson (1885–1950), was born in Ballynahinch
- Irish international cricketer, Joseph Coskery (1895–1965), was from Ballynahinch
- David Howland, professional footballer, was born in Ballynahinch in 1986
- Brian Philip Davis, film editor, was raised in Ballynahinch

== See also ==
- List of localities in Northern Ireland by population
- Market houses in Northern Ireland
