= HMS Erin's Isle =

Minesweeper of the Royal Navy

Coordinates: 51°33′N 1°19′E

History
- Name: PS Erin's Isle (1912–15); HMS Erin's Isle (1915–19)
- Namesake: "Erin", Hiberno-English for Ireland
- Owner: Belfast and County Down Railway
- Operator: B&CDR (1912–15); Royal Navy (1915–19)
- Port of registry: (United Kingdom); (United Kingdom)
- Builder: A&J Inglis, Glasgow
- Cost: £24,000
- Yard number: 300
- Launched: 12 June 1912
- In service: 12 July 1912
- Fate: Sunk by mine 7 February 1919

General characteristics
- Type: passenger ferry
- Tonnage: 630 GRT or 633 GRT
- Length: 225 ft (69 m) or 225.3 ft (68.7 m)
- Beam: 29 ft (8.8 m) or 29.2 ft (8.9 m)
- Draught: 9 ft (2.7 m) or 8.7 ft (2.7 m)
- Propulsion: side paddles powered by two two-cylinder compound diagonal steam engines

HMS Erin's Isle was a United Kingdom passenger paddle steamer built by A&J Inglis for the Belfast and County Down Railway (B&CDR). She was launched in Glasgow in 1912 as PS Erin's Isle, and sailed regular services on Belfast Lough until 1915.

She was then requisitioned for the Royal Navy and became the minesweeper HMS Erin's Isle. On 7 February 1919 she was sunk by a mine off Nore. with the loss of 23 lives.

== With the B&CDR ==
The B&CDR had owned and run steamships since 1893, mainly between Belfast and Bangor but also to other destinations in County Down and County Antrim.

At the end of the 1911 summer season the railway planned to sell PS Slieve Bearnagh, which dated from 1894, and replace her with a new, larger and more modern ship. The company ordered Erin's Isle from A&J Inglis of Pointhouse, Glasgow, who launched her on 12 June 1912 and fitted her out in less than a month. The B&CDR named her after "Erin", the Hiberno-English version of the Irish Éirinn, meaning Ireland.

Erin's Isle entered B&CDR service on 12 July 1912. She worked seasonally from mid-May to the end of September each year, making regular scheduled runs between Belfast and Bangor and between Bangor and Larne, plus excursions from Bangor to other destinations. She ended her fourth summer season on 29 September 1915.

== With the Royal Navy ==
The wreck of Erin's Isle lies in North Edinburgh Channel, north of Thanet.

The Admiralty inspected Erin's Isle on 8 October 1915, and then requisitioned her on 20 November for £400 per month. Six days later she sailed from Belfast to become the Royal Navy auxiliary minesweeper HMS Erin's Isle.

Erin's Isle remained in Royal Navy service after the Armistice with Germany. On 6 February 1919 she sailed from Sheerness on the Isle of Sheppey and anchored for the night in the North Edinburgh Channel off the Thames Estuary, not far from the Nore sandbank. At 0600 hrs on 7 November she was still at anchor and her crew were called to rise. About five minutes later a drifting mine struck the forward part of her starboard side beneath the seamen's quarters, blowing her practically in two. She sank in about two minutes with the loss of 23 lives. 28 survivors were rescued, of whom only about three were seamen from the quarters where the mine had struck.

The Admiralty paid £53,676 compensation to the B&CDR for the loss of the ship but the railway found that a new ship would cost £64,000. Given the changed economic circumstances after the First World War the company decided not to replace her.

== Wreck and war grave ==
The wreck of Erin's Isle lies in the North Edinburgh Channel off the Thames Estuary. In 2001 the Ministry of Defence (MoD) began a rolling programme of assessment of wrecks for possible protection as war graves under the Protection of Military Remains Act 1986. In August 2004 the Port of London Authority was advised that the MoD had not designated wreck as a protected place under the Act, but could decide to do so in future.

== Sources ==
- Hanlan, J.W. (26 February 1919). Text Attachment. Kingston-upon-Hull: Virtual Museum of Canada. (Letter from First Lieutenant Hanlan to Mrs Eileen Fowlow of Trinity East, Newfoundland, widow of Seaman John Fowlow, RNCVR.)
- McCutcheon, W.A. (1980). The Industrial Archaeology of Northern Ireland. Belfast: HMSO. p. 149. ISBN 0337081549.
- Patterson, E.M. (1982) [1958]. Belfast and County Down Railway. Newton Abbot: David & Charles. pp. 13–14. ISBN 071538306X.
- Wessex Archaeology (August 2004). North Edinburgh Channel Dredging Disposal Area; Archaeological Assessment Technical Report. Salisbury: The Trust for Wessex Archaeology Limited, for the Port of London Authority. p. 18. 54757.02.
