= Cultra railway station =

Railway station in Northern Ireland

Cultra
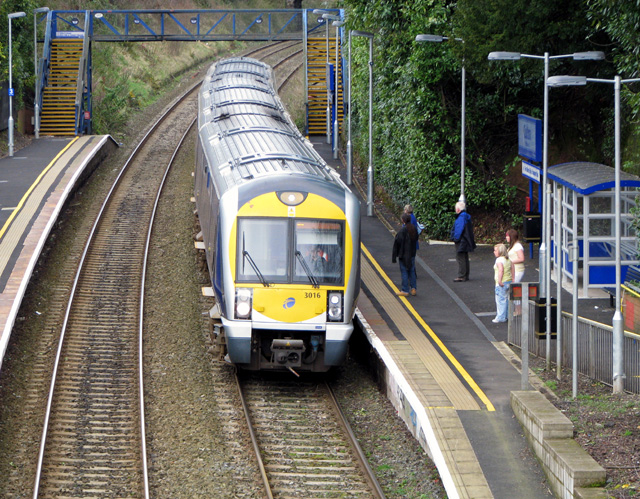
- Cultra railway station

General information
- Location: Cultra (Holywood); Northern Ireland
- Coordinates: 54.6523°N 5.8050°W
- Owner: NI Railways
- Operator: NI Railways
- Line: Bangor
- Platforms: 2
- Tracks: 2

Construction
- Structure type: At-grade

Other information
- Station code: CT

Key dates
- May 1865: Opened
- 11 November 1957: Closed
- 1978: Re-opened
- 2008: Refurbished

Passengers
- 2022/23: 60,665
- 2023/24: ▲73,667
- 2024/25: ▼71,305
- 2025/26: ▲85,608
- NI Railways; Translink; NI railway stations
Route map
(Click to expand)
Location
- Location within Northern Ireland Location within island of Ireland

Cultra railway station is a railway station in the townland of Ballycultra in Holywood, County Down, Northern Ireland. It serves the Cultra residential area and the Ulster Folk and Transport Museum.

== History ==
The Belfast, Holywood and Bangor Railway was authorised by Act of Parliament on 12 June 1861 and opened in May 1865. The BH&BR crossed the land of some wealthy landowners, whose terms included that Cultra station must be "of an ornamental character" and that "at least One Half of the Trains" must call there, or else the company would be penalised £10 per day.

The BH&BR was originally single track and the only passing loop was at Craigavad, so Cultra station would have had only one platform. However, the Belfast and County Down Railway took over the BH&BR in 1884 and doubled the track between 1897 and 1902, from which time Cultra has had two platforms. In deference to Cultra's wealthy residents the footbridge between the platforms had a roof, the only bridge so equipped on the B&CDR network.

Cultra station features in the documentary film A Letter from Ulster (1942); the narrator incorrectly describes the station as Coleraine.

Due to low passenger numbers, the Ulster Transport Authority closed the station on 11 November 1957. However, subsequently the Ulster Folk and Transport Museum was established at Cultra. Northern Ireland Railways reopened the station in 1978, primarily to serve the museum.

== Service ==
Mondays to Saturdays there is a half-hourly service westbound to Belfast Grand Central in one direction, and eastbound to Bangor in the other. More frequent trains run at peak times, and the service reduces to hourly in the evenings.

Some peak-hour trains pass through Cultra station without stopping.

On Sundays there is an hourly service in each direction.

Preceding station	NI Railways	Following station
Marino	Northern Ireland Railways; Belfast-Bangor Line	Seahill

== Sources ==
- Patterson, E.M. (1982) [1958]. Belfast and County Down Railway. Newton Abbott: David & Charles. pp. 8, 41. ISBN 071538306X.
