= Newtownards railway station =

Former railway station in Newtownards, Northern Ireland

Coordinates: 54.597366°N 5.706346°W

Newtownards

General information
- Location: Newtownards, County Down; Northern Ireland

Other information
- Status: Disused

History
- Original company: Belfast and County Down Railway
- Pre-grouping: Belfast and County Down Railway
- Post-grouping: Belfast and County Down Railway

Key dates
- 6 May 1858: Station opens
- 3 June 1861: Station relocated
- 24 April 1950: Station closes
Location

Newtownards railway station was on the Belfast and County Down Railway which ran from Belfast to Donaghadee in Northern Ireland.

== History ==
The station was opened by the Belfast and County Down Railway on 6 May 1858.

The station closed to passengers in 1950, by which time it had been taken over by the Ulster Transport Authority.

Preceding station	Historical railways	Following station
Comber	Belfast and County Down Railway; Belfast-Donaghadee	Conlig
