= Joseph Coskery =

Irish cricketer

Personal information
- Full name: Joseph Whiteside Coskery
- Born: 22 July 1895; Ballynahinch, Ireland
- Died: 24 September 1965 (aged 70); Bangor, Northern Ireland
- Batting: Left-handed

Domestic team information
- Years: Team
- 1924: Ireland

Career statistics
Competition	First-class
Matches	1
Runs scored	7
Batting average	7.00
100s/50s	–/–
Top score	4*
Catches/stumpings	–/–
- Source: Cricinfo, 2 January 2022

Joseph Whiteside Coskery (22 July 1895 in County Down – 24 September 1965 in County Down) was an Irish cricketer. A left-handed batsman, he played twice for the Ireland cricket team, against Scotland and the MCC in 1924. The match against Scotland had first-class status.
