= Conlig railway station =

Former station in Northern Ireland

Coordinates: 54.631822°N 5.660105°W

Conlig

General information
- Location: Conlig, County Down; Northern Ireland

Other information
- Status: Disused

History
- Original company: Belfast and County Down Railway

Key dates
- 3 June 1861: Station opens
- 1 June 1865: Station closes
Location

Conlig railway station was on the Belfast and County Down Railway which ran from Belfast to Donaghadee in Northern Ireland.

== History ==
The station was opened by the Belfast and County Down Railway on 1 October 1861. The station didn't last long as it was closed on 1 June 1865.

== Routes ==
Preceding station	Historical railways	Following station
Newtownards	Belfast and County Down Railway; Belfast-Donaghadee	Millisle Road Halt
