= PS Slieve Donard =

History
- Name: PS Slieve Donard (1893–1899); PS Albion (1900–1915); HMS Albyn (1915–1921)
- Namesake: Slieve Donard in County Down; "Albion", the old name for Great Britain; "Albyn", from Alba, the Scots Gaelic name for Scotland
- Owner: Belfast and County Down Railway (1893–99); Alexander Campbell (1899–1900); P&A Campbell (1900–1921)
- Operator: B&CDR (1893–99); P&A Campbell (1900–1915); Royal Navy (1915–17)
- Port of registry: (United Kingdom); (United Kingdom)
- Builder: J&G Thomson
- Launched: 20 May 1893
- In service: 20 June 1893
- Fate: Scrapped 1921

General characteristics
- Type: passenger ferry
- Tonnage: 341 GRT, 360 GRT or 363 GRT
- Length: 200 ft (61 m)
- Beam: 25 ft (7.6 m)
- Draught: 9 ft (2.7 m)
- Propulsion: side paddles powered by two compound diagonal steam engines. High pressure cylinders 26 inches (660 mm) bore x 54 inches (1,400 mm) stroke; low pressure cylinders 55 inches (1,400 mm) bore x 54 inches (1,400 mm) stroke.
- Speed: 17 knots (31 km/h; 20 mph)

PS Slieve Donard was a United Kingdom passenger paddle steamer that in different periods of her history was also called PS Albion and HMS Albyn. Albion is the name she bore the longest and may be the one by which she is better known in England. Slieve Donard was her original name and the one by which she will be best known on the island of Ireland.

J&G Thomson launched Slieve Donard in 1893 for the Belfast and County Down Railway (B&CDR). In 1900 she joined P&A Campbell's White Funnel Fleet of pleasure steamers and was renamed Albion. From 1915 she served with the Royal Navy as HMS Albyn. She was bombed in 1917 and scrapped in 1921.

== Slieve Donard with the B&CDR ==
J&G Thomson of Clydebank built the ship for the B&CDR for a price of more than £18,000. Thomson's launched her on 20 May 1893 and quickly her fitted out, giving her a capacity for a combined total of 1,065 passengers and crew. The B&CDR named her Slieve Donard after the highest peak in the Mourne Mountains in County Down.

At the same time Thomson built an exact sister ship, PS Glen Rosa, for the Glasgow and South Western Railway. Thomson had launched another sister ship for the G&SWR, PS Minerva (1893), a few weeks previously. Minerva had detail differences from Glen Rosa and Slieve Donard.

Slieve Donard entered service on 20 June 1893, which was within a week of her arrival on Belfast Lough. Her regular route was between Belfast and Bangor, for which the scheduled journey time was 55 minutes.

On 1 May 1894 the B&CDR introduced a second new steamer, the slightly larger PS Slieve Bearnagh. Between them Donard and Bearnagh made six sailings per day from Belfast to Bangor from Mondays to Saturdays and a similar number back to Belfast. There were five sailings on Sundays, and from Mondays to Saturdays one sailing per day extended beyond Bangor to Donaghadee. On Saturday afternoons other sailings continued from Bangor across Belfast Lough to Larne.

== Albion with P&A Campbell ==
In 1899 the B&CDR sold Slieve Donard for £12,500 to Captain Alexander Campbell, co-founder of the P&A Campbell pleasure steamer company. The Campbells renamed her Albion and her to their "White Funnel Fleet". The Campbells stationed her at Southampton 1900–02, Newport 1903–12 and Brighton 1913–14. On 1 April 1907 she ran aground in the Bristol Channel off Portishead, but with the aid of tugs she was refloated on the next high tide.

== Albyn with the Royal Navy ==
In 1915 the Admiralty requisitioned Albion, renamed her HMS Albyn and had her converted into a minesweeper. With the Royal Navy she was stationed at Dover and in 1917 she was bombed and set on fire by enemy action.

After the First World War Albyn was not refurbished. She was scrapped in 1921 but P&A Campbell had her engines salvaged. Ailsa Shipbuilding Company of Troon installed them in PS Glen Gower, which they built for P&A Campbell and launched in 1922.

== Sources ==
- McCutcheon, W.A. (1980). The Industrial Archaeology of Northern Ireland. Belfast: HMSO. p. 149. ISBN 0337081549.
- Patterson, E.M. (1982) [1958]. Belfast and County Down Railway. Newton Abbott: David & Charles. p. 13. ISBN 071538306X.
