= PS Minerva (1893) =

Passenger paddle steamer

History
- Name: PS Minerva
- Namesake: the goddess Minerva in ancient Roman mythology
- Owner: Glasgow and South Western Railway (1893–1920)
- Operator: Glasgow and South Western Railway (1893–1916); Royal Navy (1916–20)
- Port of registry: (United Kingdom); (United Kingdom)
- Builder: J&G Thomson
- Yard number: 264
- Launched: 6 May 1893
- Fate: Scrapped by 1928

General characteristics
- Type: passenger ferry
- Tonnage: 306 GRT
- Length: 200 ft (61 m)
- Beam: 25 ft (7.6 m)
- Propulsion: side paddles powered by two compound diagonal steam engines. High pressure cylinders 26 inches (660 mm) bore x 54 inches (1,400 mm) stroke; low pressure cylinders 55 inches (1,400 mm) bore x 54 inches (1,400 mm) stroke.

PS Minerva was a 306 GRT passenger paddle steamer that J&G Thomson launched in 1893 for the Glasgow and South Western Railway (G&SWR). She served with the Royal Navy from 1916 and was sold into civilian service in Turkey in 1924. She was scrapped by 1928.

== History ==
J&G Thomson of Clydebank launched Minerva for the G&SWR on 6 May 1893. She had two sister ships with slight detail differences: PS Glen Rosa, which was also built for the G&SWR, and PS Slieve Donard, which was built for the Belfast and County Down Railway.

She worked various G&SWR ferry routes, commonly to Rothesay and the Kyles, and in winter to the Isle of Arran. In 1902 she was re-boilered, as a result of which her funnel was moved further forward.

In June 1916 the Admiralty requisitioned her for the Royal Navy as an auxiliary patrol vessel. The Turkish Navy captured her in 1917. After the Armistice of Mudros in 1918 she returned to the Royal Navy. From April 1919 she served as a minesweeper.

In 1924 she was sold to Turkish owners, who operated her as a ferry on the Bosphorus. She had been scrapped by 1928.
