= Ballynahinch Junction railway station =

Disused railway station in County Down, Northern Ireland

Coordinates: 54.42667°N 5.821295°W

Ballynahinch Junction
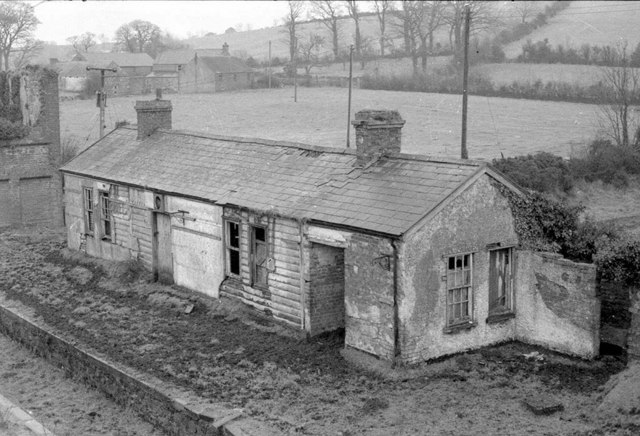
- The rotting station office in March 1980, 30 years after closure

General information
- Location: County Down; Northern Ireland

Other information
- Status: Demolished

History
- Original company: Belfast and County Down Railway
- Pre-grouping: Belfast and County Down Railway
- Post-grouping: Belfast and County Down Railway

Key dates
- 10 September 1858: Station opens
- 16 January 1950: Station closes
Location

Ballynahinch Junction railway station was on the Belfast and County Down Railway which ran from Belfast to Newcastle in Northern Ireland. The railway split off from the main line here onto the Ballynahinch Branch.

== History ==
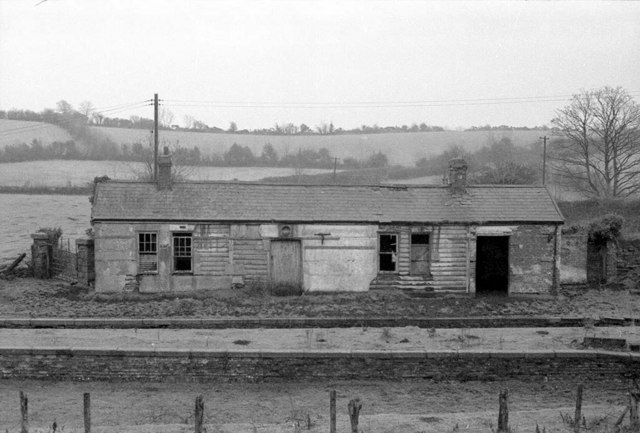
View of the station taken in March 1980

The station was opened by the Belfast and County Down Railway on 10 September 1858.

The station closed to passengers on 16 January 1950, by which time it had been taken over by the Ulster Transport Authority.

== Routes ==
| Preceding station | Historical railways | Following station |
|---|---|---|
| Saintfield | Belfast and County Down Railway; Belfast-Newcastle | Crossgar |
| Saintfield | Belfast and County Down Railway; Ballynahinch branch | Creevyargon Halt |
