= Assumption Grammar School =

Coordinates: 54.4054°N 5.8956°W

Location
- 24 Belfast Road; Ballynahinch, County Down, BT24 8EA, Northern Ireland

Information
- Type: Grammar
- Motto: ex sola virtute honor (From virtue alone comes honour)
- Religious affiliation: Roman Catholic
- Founder: Mother Baptist McKenny
- Chairperson: Anne Moclair
- Principal: Peter Dobbin
- Gender: Female
- Age: 11 to 19
- Enrolment: 905
- Houses: Knock; Saul; Drogheda; Iona; Faughart
- Colour
- Website: www.assumptiongrammar.org.uk

Assumption Grammar School (also known as 'The Assumption', 'Assumption Grammar' or 'AGS’) is a Catholic girls' grammar school in Ballynahinch, County Down, Northern Ireland, with over 900 students.

== History ==
The school was founded by the Missionary Sisters of the Assumption in 1933, and approved by the Ministry of Education in 1936. The first principal was Mother Baptist McKenny. It is the only Assumption school in Ireland. The school is linked with the Assumption school in Grahamstown, South Africa.

== Facilities ==
The school officially opened its new school building on Friday 4 May 2012 by Sister Anne Patricia Flynn MSA, the Congregational Leader of the Missionary Sisters of the Assumption. The building hosts two multi-purpose halls, Windmill Restaurant, library, drama suites, ICT suites and music facilities including a music technology suite. The school grounds include a Gaelic football and camogie pitch and an astro-turf pitch.

== Academics ==
Admission to the school is by examination and entrance to Year 13 or Lower Sixth is based on GCSE grades.

The school offers instruction in a full range of subjects including: Art & Design, Biology, Business Studies, Chemistry, Computing, Digital Technology, Drama, Economics, English, English Literature, Food & Nutrition, French, Further Mathematics, Geography, Health & Social Care, History, Irish, Learning for Life & Work, Mathematics, Moving Image Arts, Music, Physical Education, Physics, Politics, Psychology, Religious Studies, Science, Sociology, Spanish, Statistics, Technology & Design and Theatre Studies.

The school is currently a Specialist School for Music with PE as a subsidiary subject. Assumption Grammar now works along with 8 partner schools in the community providing opportunities for primary school children to have greater access to music both in and out of the classroom and allowing post-primary students the chance to study music at GCSE.

In 2018 it was ranked joint first in Northern Ireland for its GCSE performance with 100% of its entrants receiving five or more GCSEs at grades A* to C, including the core subjects English and Maths.

85.4% of its A-level students who sat the exams in 2017/18 were awarded three A*-C grades.

== Extra-curricular activities ==
=== Sport ===
The school has several sports teams including netball, camogie, dance, athletics, horse riding, cross country and Gaelic football. The Gaelic team is split into four teams: Year 8, Under 14, Under 16 and Under 20. The camogie is split likewise with the exception of the Under 20s, which is simply called the Senior team. The school has entered five netball teams into the NI League and Cup competitions and three into the East Down League. Two teams of 8 pupils will be selected from Year 8 for the East Down Tournament which is to be held in May.

The minor team and Year 9 A team are entered into the Rockport Invitational Tournament held in May. A dance team takes part in the NI Creative and Dance Competition, which is held in March.

=== Music ===
The music department offers lessons for strings, woodwind, brass, traditional instruments, percussion and voice. Students are prepared for graded examinations through the Associated Board of the Royal Schools of Music in both practical and theory. They may also take exams in Traditional Music through the London College of Music and Drums through the ‘Rockschool’ system.

The current music groups and ensembles are Senior Orchestra, Training Orchestra, Senior and Junior Chamber Ensembles, several string ensembles such as quartets, trios and sextets, Senior and Junior Choirs, Senior and Junior Barbershop, Chamber Choir, Jazz Ensemble, Irish Traditional Group and a djembe group. The school hosts annual concerts which have taken place in the Waterfront Hall and the Ulster Hall, both situated in Belfast. Many of the music students take part in the Holywood and Ballymena Festivals every year. Assumption won the Best School (Instrumental) award at the Ballymena Festival in 2011.

== Principals ==
For the first 67 years of its existence the school was led by a religious sister but since 2000 it has been led by a lay principal.

- 1933–1937: Mother Baptist McKenny
- 1937–1940: Sister Joachim Baker
- 1940–1960: Sister Pauline Mawson
- 1960–1983: Sister Jarlath McKenna
- 1983–1994: Sister Eileen Bogues
- 1994–2000: Sister Maureen Carville
- 2000–2008: Mrs Sheila Crea
- 2008–2014: Mr Paul McBride
- 2014–Present: Mr Peter Dobbin

== Notable alumnae ==
- Bríd Brennan (born 1955) – actress
- Dame Brenda King (born 1964) – Attorney General for Northern Ireland
- Leontia Flynn (born 1974) – poet
- Ciara Mageean (1992-2026) -athlete
- Niamh McGrady (born 1982) – actress
- Mary Rose McGrath (fashion designer)
- Eileen O'Higgins (born 1987) – actress
- Julie Sinnamon (Chief Executive, Enterprise Ireland)
