= Ballygowan railway station =

Railway station in County Down, Northern Ireland

Coordinates: 54.501700°N 5.792680°W

Ballygowan
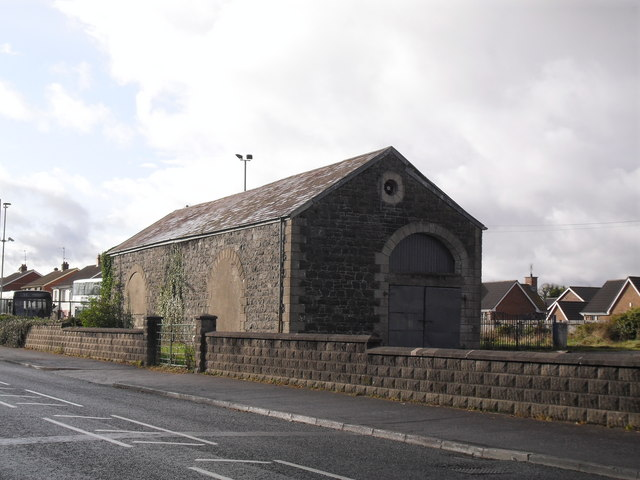
- The goods shed is all that remains of Ballygowan railway station

General information
- Location: Ballygowan, County Down; Northern Ireland

Other information
- Status: Disused

History
- Original company: Belfast and County Down Railway
- Pre-grouping: Belfast and County Down Railway
- Post-grouping: Belfast and County Down Railway

Key dates
- 10 September 1858: Station opens
- 15 January 1950: Station closes
Location

Ballygowan railway station was a rural station in Ballygowan, County Down between Comber and Saintfield on the Belfast and County Down Railway which ran from Belfast Queens Quay station to Newcastle railway station in Northern Ireland.

== History ==
The station was opened by the Belfast and County Down Railway on 10 September 1858.

The station had only one platform on the south side. There was a level crossing at the Comber end. The goods store on the Saintfield end was added in 1898.

The station closed to passengers on 15 January 1950 along with the rest of the Belfast and County Down Railway bar the Bangor branch, by which time it had been taken over by the Ulster Transport Authority.

The station has since been demolished and rebuilt into a shop and a private residence but the goods shed still stands, now used by the company Station Autos. Part of the former train yard on the west side is now used as a bus depot by Translink Ulsterbus.

== Routes ==
Preceding station	Historical railways	Following station
Comber	Belfast and County Down Railway; Belfast-Newcastle	Shepherd's Bridge Halt
