= Ballykinlar Halt railway station =

Railway station in County Down, Northern Ireland

Coordinates: 54.30105°N 5.797777°W

Ballykinlar Halt

General information
- Location: Ballykinler, County Down; Northern Ireland

Other information
- Status: Disused

History
- Original company: Belfast and County Down Railway
- Pre-grouping: Belfast and County Down Railway
- Post-grouping: Belfast and County Down Railway

Key dates
- October 1914: Station opens
- 16 January 1950: Station closes
Location

Ballykinlar Halt railway station was on the Belfast and County Down Railway which ran from Belfast to Newcastle, County Down in Northern Ireland.

== History ==
It was opened by the Belfast and County Down Railway in October 1914, primarily to service the British Army base at Ballykinlar. The station closed to passengers in 1950, by which time it had been taken over by the Ulster Transport Authority. The earliest mention via the British Newspaper Archive was on 31 October 1914 in the Weekly Telegraph https://www.britishnewspaperarchive.co.uk/viewer/bl/0001531/19141031/111/0008.

== Routes ==
Preceding station	Historical railways	Following station
Tullymurry	Belfast and County Down Railway; Belfast-Newcastle	Dundrum
