= Shepherd's Bridge Halt railway station =

Former halt in County Down, Northern Ireland

Coordinates: 54.48345°N 5.814900°W

Shepherd's Bridge Halt

General information
- Location: County Down; Northern Ireland

Other information
- Status: Disused

History
- Original company: Belfast and County Down Railway
- Pre-grouping: Belfast and County Down Railway
- Post-grouping: Belfast and County Down Railway

Key dates
- 24 November 1930: Station opens
- 15 January 1950: Station closes
Location

Shepherd's Bridge Halt was a basic halt on the Belfast and County Down Railway which ran from Belfast Queens Quay station to Newcastle railway station in Northern Ireland. It is about 13.7 miles from Queens Quay station

== History ==
The station was opened by the Belfast and County Down Railway on Monday, 24 November 1930.

The station closed to passengers on 15 January 1950 along with the rest of the Belfast and County Down Railway line, by which time it had been taken over by the Ulster Transport Authority.

Preceding station	Historical railways	Following station
Ballygowan	Belfast and County Down Railway; Belfast-Newcastle	Saintfield
