= Dundrum railway station =

Railway station in County Down, Northern Ireland

Coordinates: 54.258105°N 5.844212°W

Dundrum

General information
- Location: Dundrum, County Down, County Down; Northern Ireland

Other information
- Status: Disused

History
- Original company: Belfast and County Down Railway
- Pre-grouping: Belfast and County Down Railway
- Post-grouping: Great Northern Railway (Ireland)

Key dates
- 25 March 1869: Station opens
- 16 January 1950: Station closes
Location

Dundrum railway station was on the Belfast and County Down Railway which ran from Belfast to Newcastle, County Down in Northern Ireland.

== History ==
The station was opened by the Belfast and County Down Railway on 25 March 1869.

The station closed to passengers in 1950, by which time it had been taken over by the Ulster Transport Authority.

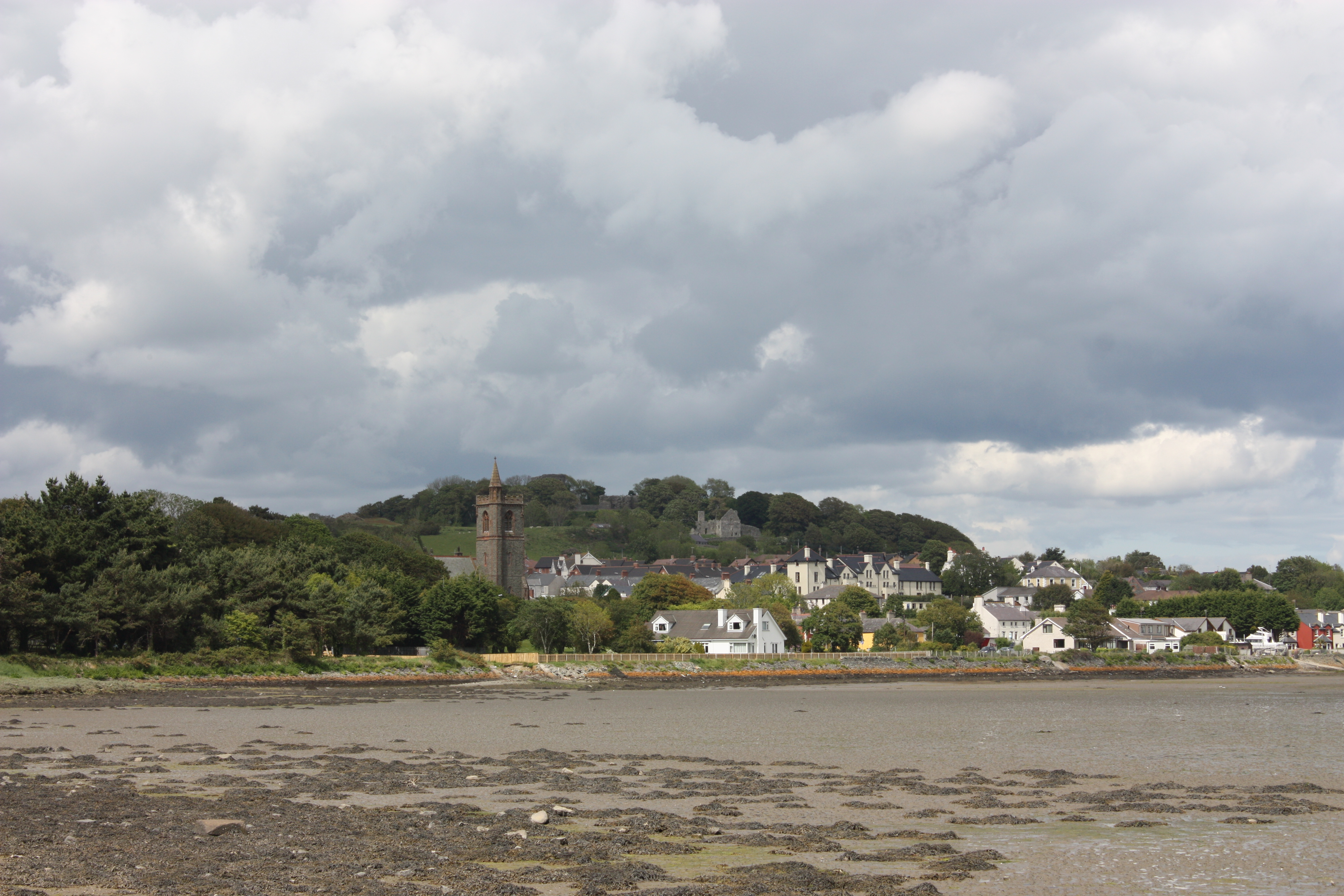
Dundrum Bay showing the dramatic scenery that the railway encountered on the shore.

== The site today ==
Preceding station	Historical railways	Following station
Ballykinlar Halt	Belfast and County Down Railway; Belfast-Newcastle	Newcastle
