= Ballynahinch railway station =

Disused railway station in County Down, Northern Ireland

Coordinates: 54.403608°N 5.893843°W

Ballynahinch
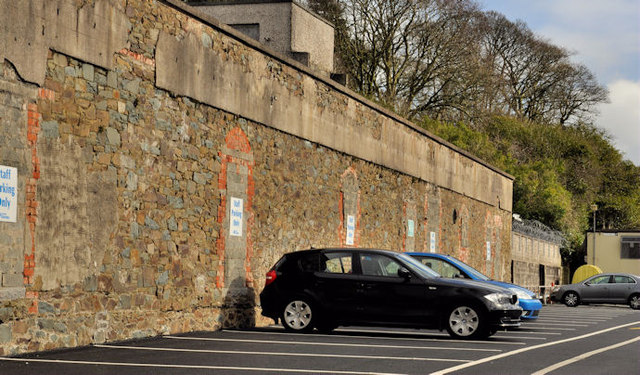

General information
- Location: Ballynahinch, County Down, County Down; Northern Ireland

Other information
- Status: Disused

History
- Original company: Belfast and County Down Railway
- Pre-grouping: Belfast and County Down Railway
- Post-grouping: Belfast and County Down Railway

Key dates
- 10 September 1858: Station opens
- 16 January 1950: Station closes
Location

Ballynahinch railway station was on the Belfast and County Down Railway which ran from Belfast to Ballynahinch in Northern Ireland.

== History ==
The station was opened by the Belfast and County Down Railway on 10 September 1858.

The station closed to passengers in 1950, by which time it had been taken over by the Ulster Transport Authority.

Preceding station	Historical railways	Following station
Creevyargon Halt	Belfast and County Down Railway; Belfast-Ballynahinch	Terminus
