= PS Glen Rosa =

History
- Name: PS Glen Rosa; HMS Glencross
- Namesake: Glen Rosa on the Isle of Arran; Glencross, Midlothian
- Owner: Glasgow and South Western Railway (1893–1923); London, Midland and Scottish Railway (1923–38); Caledonian Steam Packet Company (1938–39)
- Operator: G&SWR (1893–1923); Royal Navy (World War I); LMS (1923–38)
- Port of registry: (United Kingdom) Glasgow; (United Kingdom)
- Builder: J&G Thomson
- Cost: £17,500
- Launched: 31 May 1893
- In service: 1893
- Out of service: laid up 1939
- Identification: UK Official Number 103500
- Fate: Scrapped August 1939

General characteristics
- Type: passenger ferry
- Tonnage: 306 GRT
- Length: 200 ft (61 m)
- Beam: 25 ft (7.6 m)
- Draught: 8.3 ft (2.5 m)
- Installed power: 185 NHP
- Propulsion: side paddles powered by two compound diagonal steam engines. High pressure cylinders 26 inches (660 mm) bore x 54 inches (1,400 mm) stroke; low pressure cylinders 55 inches (1,400 mm) bore x 54 inches (1,400 mm) stroke.
- Speed: average 17.75 knots (32.9 km/h; 20.4 mph)

PS Glen Rosa was a 306 GRT passenger paddle steamer that J&G Thomson launched in 1893 for the Glasgow and South Western Railway (G&SWR). She served with the Royal Navy in the First World War as HMS Glencross. She was absorbed into the London, Midland and Scottish Railway fleet in 1923, transferred to the Caledonian Steam Packet Company in 1938 and scrapped in 1939.

== History ==
J&G Thomson of Clydebank built Glen Rosa for the G&SWR for £17,500. Thomson's launched her at Clydebank on 31 May 1893 and she completed her sea trials on 27 June. She had a 150-foot (46-metre) promenade deck.

At the same time Thomson built an exact sister ship, PS Slieve Donard, for the Belfast and County Down Railway. Another sister ship, PS Minerva (1893), had been launched for the G&SWR a few weeks previously. Minerva had detail differences from Glen Rosa and Slieve Donard.

Glen Rosa was named after Glen Rosa on the Isle of Arran. She worked various G&SWR ferry routes in the Firth of Clyde including off-season crossings to Arran.

In the First World War the Admiralty requisitioned Glen Rosa, renamed her HMS Glencross and had her converted into a minesweeper. With the Royal Navy she was based in Belfast Lough and later at Swansea.

After the First World War she returned to G&SWR service, initially serving Fairlie, North Ayrshire. Later she worked on the route between Wemyss Bay on the North Ayrshire coast, Millport on Great Cumbrae and Kilchattan on the Isle of Bute.

In the 1923 grouping of Britain's railways the G&SWR became part of the new London, Midland and Scottish Railway, and Glen Rosa became part of the LMS fleet. In 1926 she was re-boilered, as a result of which her bridge was moved forward of her funnel.

In 1938 the LMS transferred Glen Rosa to the Caledonian Steam Packet Company. In 1939 she was laid up at Greenock, and in August of that year she was scrapped at Dalmuir.
