= Saintfield railway station =

Former railway station in County Down, Northern Ireland

Coordinates: 54.461253°N 5.825555°W

Saintfield
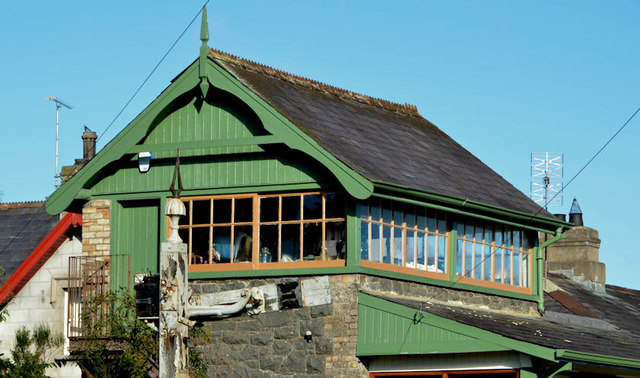
- Saintfield signal cabin

General information
- Location: Saintfield, County Down; Northern Ireland

Other information
- Status: Disused

History
- Original company: Belfast and County Down Railway
- Pre-grouping: Belfast and County Down Railway
- Post-grouping: Belfast and County Down Railway

Key dates
- 10 September 1858: Station opens
- 16 January 1950: Station closes
Location

Saintfield railway station was on the Belfast and County Down Railway which ran from Belfast to Newcastle, County Down in Northern Ireland.

== History ==
The station was opened by the Belfast and County Down Railway on 10 September 1858.

The station closed to passengers in 1950, by which time it had been taken over by the Ulster Transport Authority.

A section of the bed of the former railway approaching the station from the Belfast direction can be seen from Windmill Park (opened in 2026) including two bridges - see photographs below.

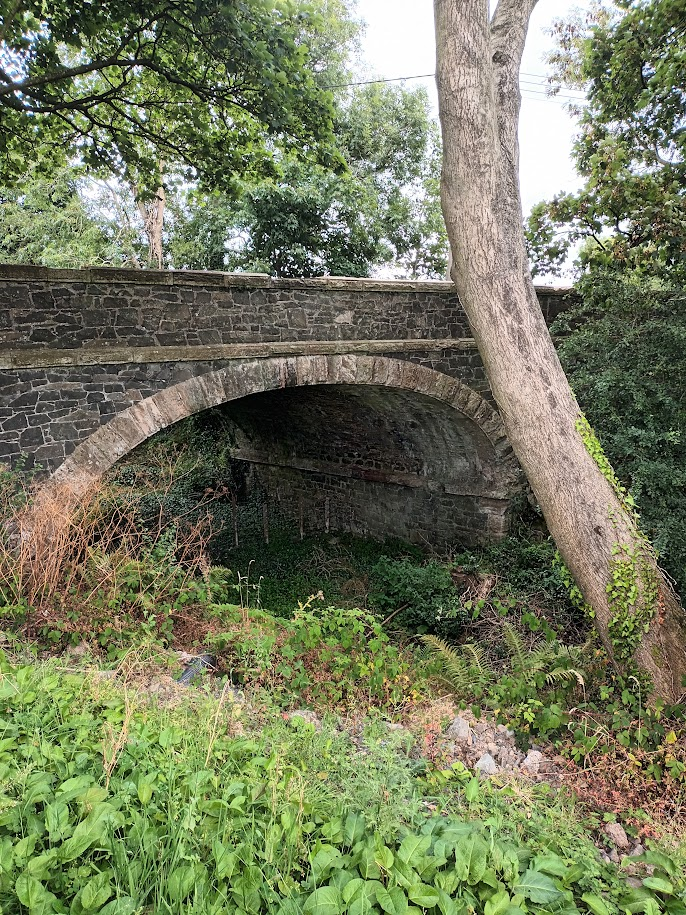
Windmill Road bridge over former Belfast and Co. Down Railway, Saintfield - viewed from Windmill Park

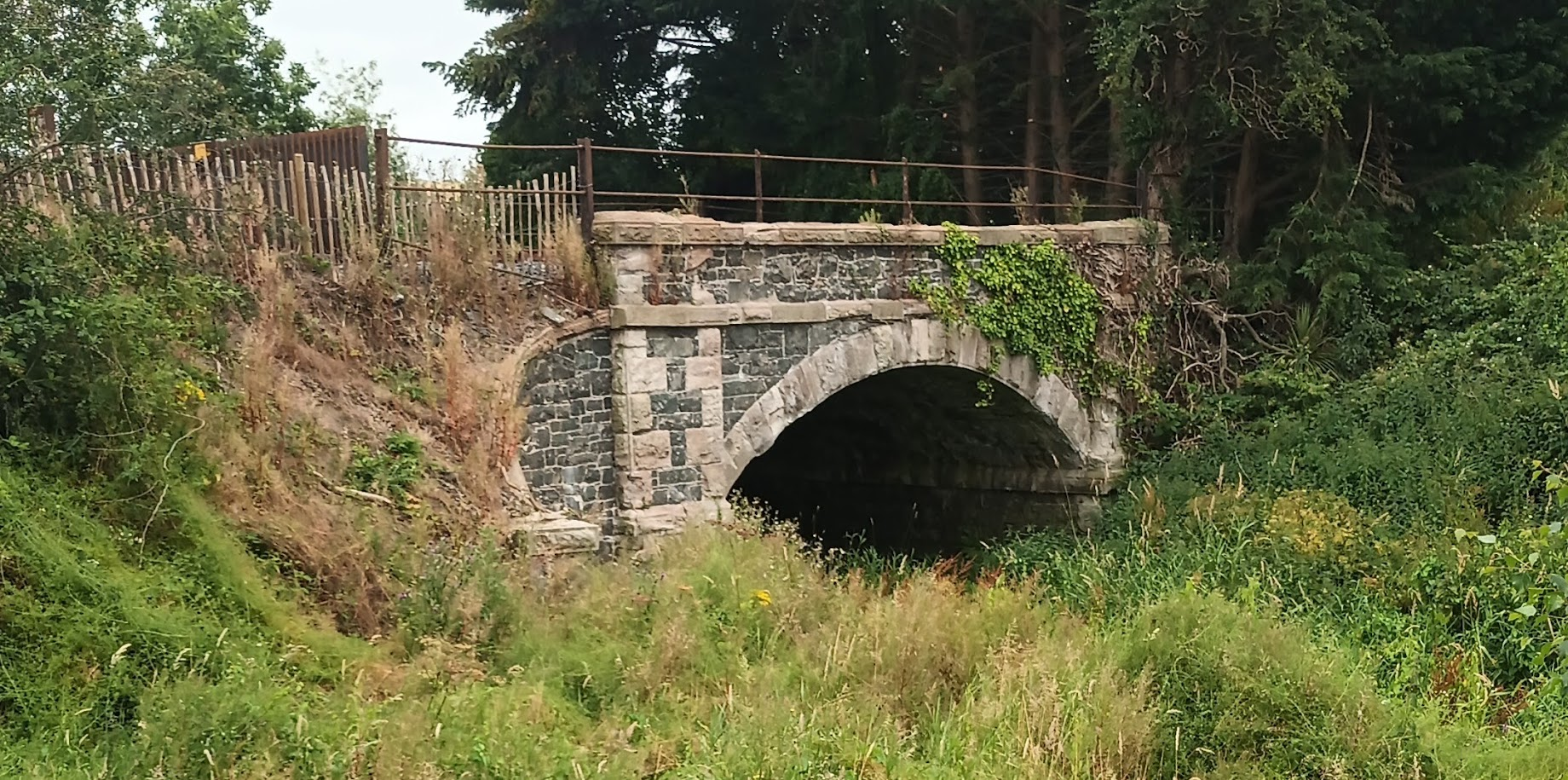
Railway bridge over Carson's Dam River, Saintfield - viewed from Windmill Park

Preceding station	Historical railways	Following station
Shepherd's Bridge Halt	Belfast and County Down Railway; Belfast-Newcastle	Ballynahinch Junction
