= Donaghadee railway station =

Railway station in County Down, Northern Ireland

Coordinates: 54.641509°N 5.531037°W

Donaghadee
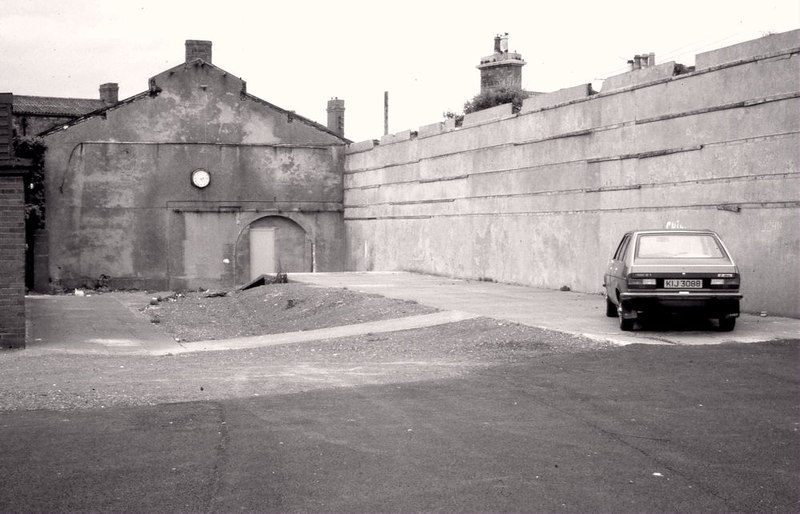

General information
- Location: Donaghadee, County Down; Northern Ireland

Other information
- Status: Disused

History
- Original company: Belfast and County Down Railway
- Pre-grouping: Belfast and County Down Railway
- Post-grouping: Belfast and County Down Railway

Key dates
- 3 June 1861: Station opens
- 24 April 1950: Station closes
Location

Donaghadee railway station was on the Belfast and County Down Railway which ran from Belfast to Donaghadee in Northern Ireland.

== History ==
The station was opened by the Belfast and County Down Railway in 1861.

The station closed to passengers in 1950, by which time it had been taken over by the Ulster Transport Authority.

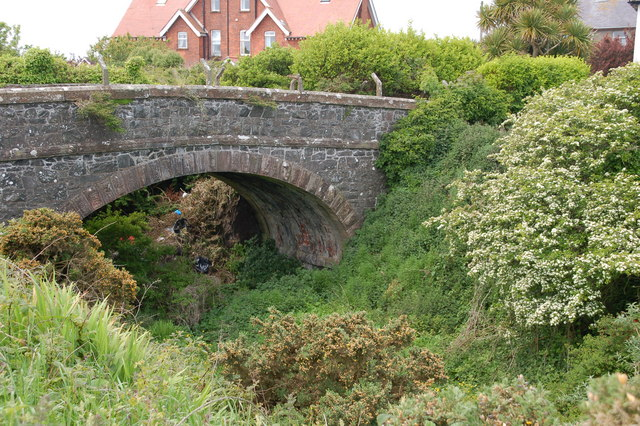
Donaghadee remains of the railway permanent way alignment.

== Routes ==
Preceding station	Historical railways	Following station
Millisle Road Halt	Belfast and County Down Railway; Belfast-Donaghadee	Terminus
