= Slieve Bearnagh =

Mountain in the Mourne Mountains, Northern Ireland

- Sliabh Bearnach
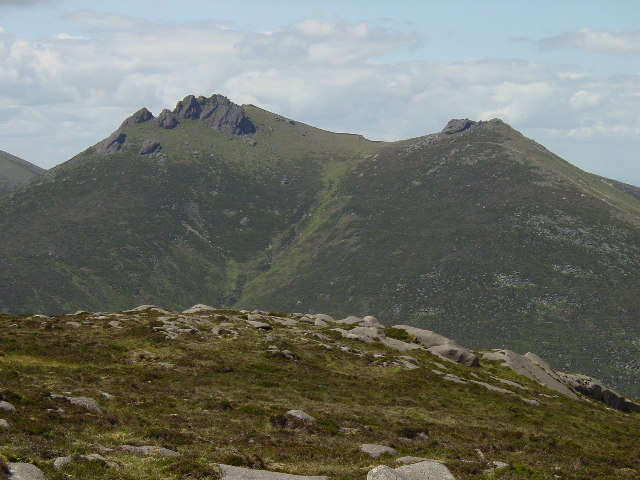
- Slieve Bearnagh from the east

Highest point
- Peak: Slieve Bearnagh summit, Mourne Mountains, County Down
- Elevation: 739 m (2,425 ft)
- Prominence: 304 m (997 ft)
- Parent peak: Slieve Commedagh
- Isolation: 1.9 km (1.2 mi) to Slieve Meelmore
- Listing: Marilyn, Hewitt
- Coordinates: 54°11′06″N 5°59′22″W

Naming
- Etymology: From Irish Sliabh Bearnach, meaning "gap mountain"
- Native name: Sliabh Bearnach (Irish)
- English translation: Gap mountain

Geography
- Location within Northern Ireland
- Location: County Down, Northern Ireland
- Country: United Kingdom
- County: County Down
- Parent range: Mourne Mountains
- OSI/OSNI grid: J313281
- Topo map: Ordnance Survey of Northern Ireland OSNI Outdoor Pursuits map Mourne Country
- Biome: Upland heath and grassland

Geology
- Formed by: Intrusive igneous activity
- Orogeny: Caledonian
- Rock age: ~60 million years (Paleogene)
- Mountain type: Granite mountain
- Rock type(s): Aplitic granite with dolerite and feldspar porphyry dykes
- Last eruption: Not applicable

Climbing
- First ascent: Unknown
- Easiest route: Hike from Trassey Track or Meelmore Lodge
- Normal route: Eastern approach via Hare’s Gap
- Access: Public access via Mourne Wall paths and upland trails

Slieve Bearnagh (SLEEV BAR-na; from Irish Sliabh Bearnach 'gapped mountain') is one of the Mourne Mountains in County Down, Northern Ireland. It has a height of 739 metres (2,425 ft). Its summit is crowned by two tors with a gap between them, giving it its distinctive shape and name. The Mourne Wall crosses the summit of Slieve Bearnagh east to west. Paths lead to the cols on either side of the mountain, namely Pollaphuca (from Irish Poll an Phúca 'hole of the púca') to the west and Hare's Gap to the east. From the latter, one can also descend southwards to the head of the Ben Crom reservoir.

== Geological Features ==
Like much of the Mourne range, Slieve Bearnagh is composed primarily of granite, formed during the Paleogene period. The tors at the summit are classic examples of granite weathering, creating dramatic rock formations.

== Ecology ==
The area surrounding Slieve Bearnagh supports upland heath and bog habitats. Vegetation includes species such as heather, bilberry, mosses, and lichens. Alpine plants such as Dwarf Willow and Cowberry are found among the summit crags, where wind passes through crevices even on calm days. Bird species commonly found in the area include meadow pipits and ravens. Slieve Bearnagh lies within the Mourne Area of Outstanding Natural Beauty (AONB), which provides environmental protection for the region. Slieve Bearnagh is listed among the principal peaks in the Mourne Mountains where summit grassland communities are developed. These communities are characterized by the dominance of Festuca ovina, Rhacomitrium lanuginosum, and dwarf Vaccinium myrtillus, and are associated with summit areas lacking peat.

== Hiking and Access ==
Slieve Bearnagh is a popular destination for hikers due to its distinctive summit and panoramic views. Common routes include ascents from Hare’s Gap or via the Trassey Track. The track begins at the Trassey Car Park and follows a gently rising path alongside Clonachullion Wood and the Trassey River, gradually transitioning from forested terrain to open mountain landscape. As hikers ascend, the track becomes rockier and steeper, eventually leading to Hare’s Gap, a mountain pass between Slievenaglogh and Slieve Bearnagh. From here, the route continues up stone steps and rugged slopes toward the summit tors of Slieve Bearnagh, offering panoramic views of the Mournes.

The Trassey Track is part of the Ulster Way and intersects with the historic Brandy Pad, once used by smugglers transporting goods across the mountains. The approach to Hare’s Gap via the Trassey Track is rocky and rugged, passing through forest edges, river fords, and granite pavements. The cliffs of Spellack (from Irish Speilg 'steep rock or crag') and the granite tors of Slieve Bearnagh flank the route, offering dramatic views and geological interest. The Mourne Wall, which crosses the summit, often serves as a navigational aid.

== Cultural and Historical Context ==
Pollaphuca is the name given to the col (a pass or saddle) between Slieve Bearnagh and Slieve Meelmore, as well as the rocky path leading to it. This area is known for its distinctive rocky tors and is a popular spot for hikers, offering stunning views of the surrounding landscape. The name “Pollaphuca” (hole of the púca) hints at Irish folklore, where the púca is a mischievous shape-shifting spirit associated with remote landscapes and known for leading people on wild nocturnal rides. The Mourne Wall itself is a significant historical structure, built between 1904 and 1922 to enclose the catchment area for the Silent Valley and Ben Crom reservoirs.
