= Belfast and County Down Railway =

Former Irish railway linking Belfast with County Down

Overview
- Dates of operation: 2 August 1848–1 October 1948
- Predecessor: Belfast, Holywood and Bangor Railway (1864-1884); Downpatrick, Dundrum and Newcastle Railway (1869-1884)
- Successor: Ulster Transport Authority

Technical
- Track gauge: 5 ft 3 in (1,600 mm)
- Length: 80 miles (130 km) (1925)
- Track length: 127 miles 11 chains (204.6 km) (1925)

The Belfast and County Down Railway (BCDR) was an Irish gauge (1,600 mm (5 ft 3 in)) railway in Ireland (later Northern Ireland) linking Belfast with County Down. It was built in the 19th century and absorbed into the Ulster Transport Authority in 1948. All but the line between Belfast and Bangor was closed in the 1950s, although some of it has been restored near Downpatrick by a heritage line, the Downpatrick and County Down Railway.

== History ==
The company was incorporated by the Belfast and County Down Railway Act 1846 (9 & 10 Vict. c. lxxxvii) on 26 June 1846 with the first section of line from Belfast to Holywood opening for traffic on 2 August 1848. The line was further extended to Bangor by the Belfast, Holywood and Bangor Railway (BHBR), opening on 1 May 1865, and acquired by the BCDR under the Belfast and County Down Railway (Bangor Transfer) Act 1884 (47 & 48 Vict. c. cxx). The line to Downpatrick was opened on 25 March 1859. The line from Downpatrick to Newcastle was built by the Downpatrick, Dundrum and Newcastle Railway, opening on 25 March 1869 and absorbed by BCDR under the Belfast and County Down Railway (Newcastle Transfer) Act 1881 (44 & 45 Vict. c. ccxiii). The railway's first chief engineer was Sir John Macneill, who was responsible for allowing the railway to cross the marshy River Quoile.

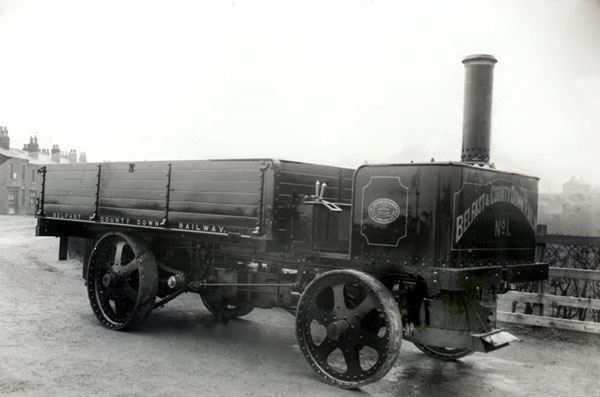
Railway-owned steam driven lorry, early 20th century.

A branch to Ballynahinch was opened in 1858 via Ballynahinch Junction.

A branch line from Downpatrick to Ardglass was opened in 1892, as was a loop line at Downpatrick. This resulted in a 'triangle'-shaped track layout just outside of Downpatrick, allowing trains between Belfast and Newcastle to collect and drop off passengers at the Loop Platform, who would be ferried between there and the main station at Downpatrick by a local train. Thanks to the triangular layout, trains were still capable of operating directly from the main Downpatrick station to Belfast or Newcastle. The branch from Newcastle to Castlewellan was opened on 24 March 1906.

By 1948 the company had 29 locomotives. Two steam railcars from Kitson & Company were acquired in 1905. The locomotive works were at Belfast Queen's Quay railway station and closed in 1950. New carriage works had been opened in 1886, with the last carriage being built in 1923.

== Routes ==
- Belfast (Queen's Quay) – Ballymacarrett Halt – Victoria Park – Sydenham – Tillysburn – Holywood – Marino – Cultra – Craigavad – Helen's Bay – Carnalea – Bangor West – Bangor
- Belfast (Queen's Quay) – Bloomfield – Neill's Hill – Knock – Dundonald – Comber
- Comber – Ballygowan – Shepherd's Bridge Halt – Saintfield – Ballynahinch Junction – Crossgar – King's Bridge Halt – Downpatrick
- Comber – Newtownards – Conlig – Ballygrainey – Millisle Road Halt – Donaghadee
- Comber – Ballygowan – Shepherd's Bridge Halt – Saintfield – Ballynahinch Junction – Creevyargon Halt – Ballynahinch
- Downpatrick – Downpatrick Loop Platform – Tullymurry – Ballykinlar Halt – Dundrum – Newcastle – Castlewellan
- Downpatrick – Downpatrick Loop Platform – Racecourse Platform – Ballynoe – Bright Halt – Killough – Coney Island Halt – Ardglass

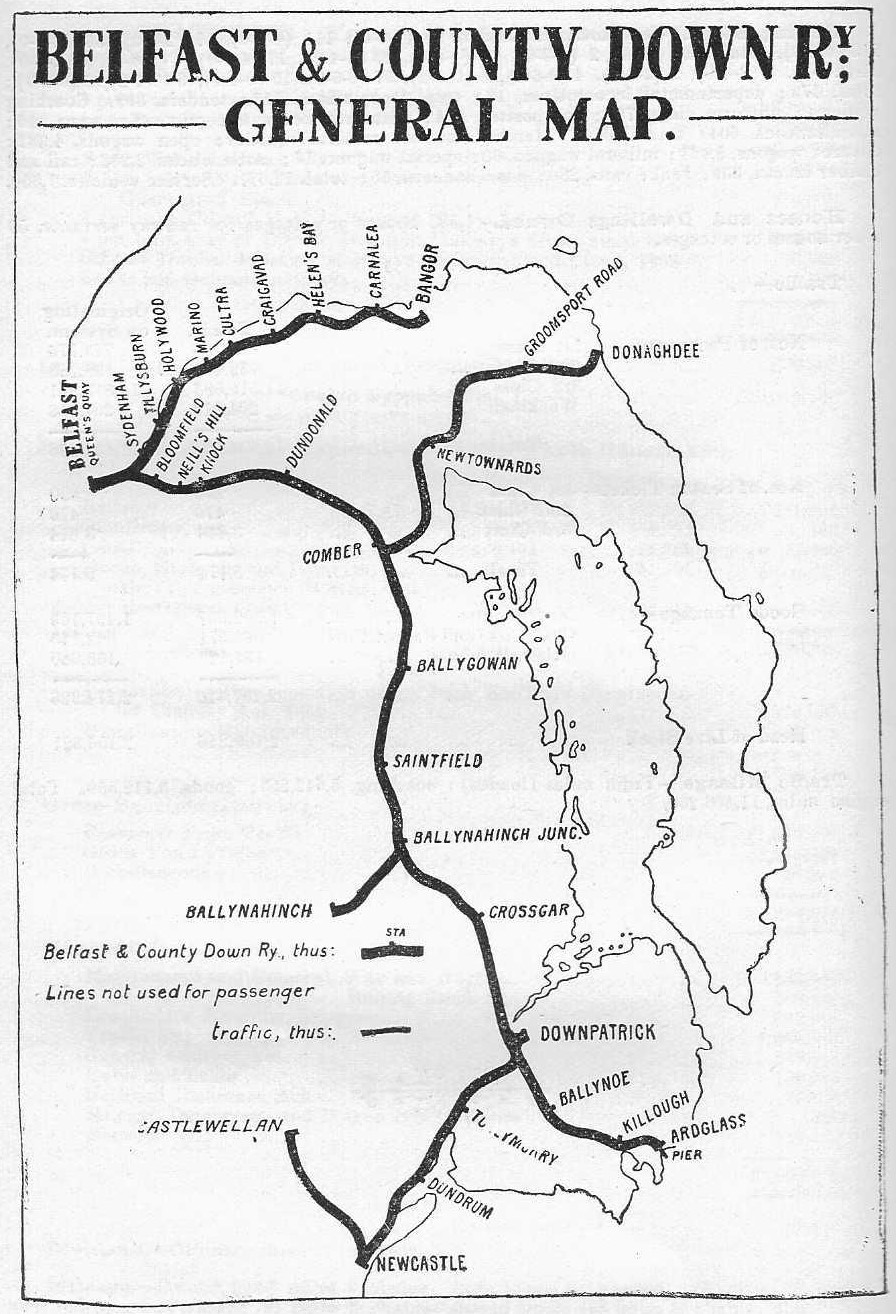

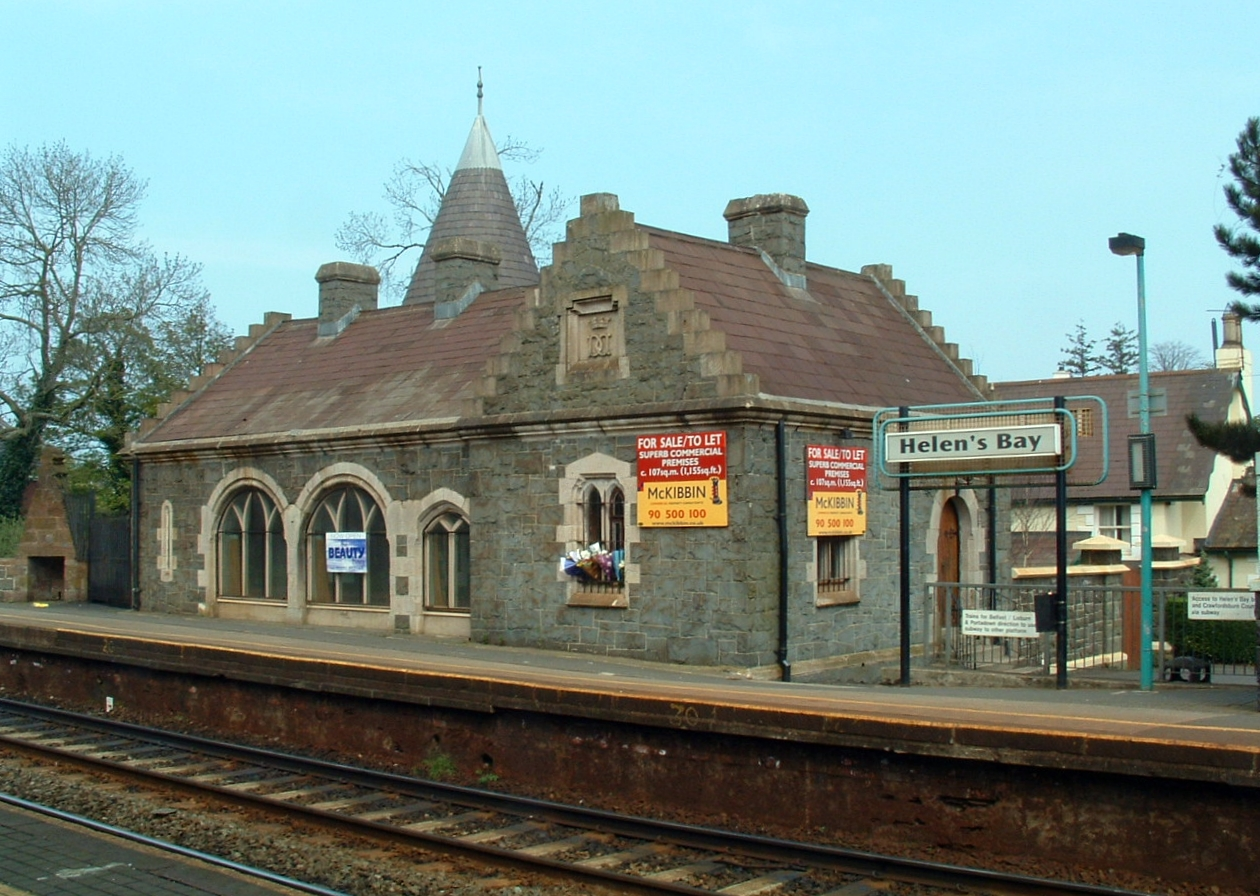
Helen's Bay railway station

== Steamships ==
The Belfast, Holywood and Bangor Railway Act 1881 (44 & 45 Vict. c. cc) authorised that company not only to have a railway built between Holywood and Bangor but also to run steamships "for the purpose of establishing an improved and efficient communication between Belfast, Holywood and Bangor". The BHBR did not exercise this power, but several years after it had been taken over by the BCDR, the latter company started running scheduled passenger steamship services on the route.

The BCDR took advice from the Glasgow and South Western Railway (G&SWR), which had been running passenger paddle steamers since 1891. For the 1893 season the G&SWR had ordered a new ship, PS Minerva (1893), to be built by J&G Thomson at Clydebank. The two railways then ordered from Thomson's two sister ships of a slightly revised design: PS Glen Rosa for the G&SWR and PS Slieve Donard for the BCDR. Thomson's launched Slieve Donard on 20 May 1893 and she entered service between Belfast's Donegall Quay and Bangor on 20 June. She was named after Slieve Donard, the highest peak in the Mourne Mountains in County Down.

In October 1893 the BCDR ordered a slightly larger paddle steamer, PS Slieve Bearnagh, named after Slieve Bearnagh, the second-highest peak in the Mourne Mountains. She made her first voyage on Belfast Lough on 1 May 1894. Donard and Bearnagh worked between Donegall Quay and Bangor, between them providing six sailings per day from Mondays to Saturdays and five on Sundays. From Mondays to Saturdays one mid-afternoon sailing per day extended around the coast to Donaghadee. On Saturday afternoons other sailings continued from Bangor across Belfast Lough to Larne.

Later that summer a local steamer line, the New Belfast, Bangor and Larne Steamboat Company, went into liquidation and the BCDR bought two of its ships, PS Bangor Castle and PS Erin, from the receivers. These ships were older and smaller than those that Thomson had supplied, and the BCDR seemed to have made little use of them. Bangor Castle had been on charter to the Southampton, Isle of Wight and South of England Royal Mail Steam Packet Company since 1888 and was scrapped in 1899.

In 1899 the railway sold Slieve Donard to Alexander Campbell, co-founder of the P & A Campbell pleasure steamer company. Slieve Bearnagh remained with the BCDR, occasionally making excursions to Portaferry on the Ards Peninsula, Ardglass in south Down, and Larne and Portrush on the coast of County Antrim in addition to her regular scheduled route on Belfast Lough.

At the end of the 1911 summer season the BCDR put Slieve Bearnagh up for sale and ordered a new paddle steamer, again slightly larger than her predecessors. A & J Inglis of Pointhouse, Glasgow launched the new ship, PS Erin's Isle, on 12 June 1912 and fitted her out in less than a month. On 19 June 1912 the railway sold Slieve Bearnagh to D&J Nicol of Dundee for service on the east coast of Scotland. Erin's Isle was in BCDR service from 12 July 1912 until her fourth summer season ended on 29 September 1915. On 20 November 1915 the Admiralty requisitioned her for £400 per month to be a Royal Navy minesweeper. On 7 May 1919 she was sunk by a mine, for which the Admiralty paid £53,676 compensation. However, the railway found that a new ship would cost £64,000 and decided not to return to owning steamships.

== Ulster Transport Authority ==
In 1946 the Northern Ireland Government announced that it would unite under a single authority all public transport that was wholly within Northern Ireland. The Transport Act (Northern Ireland) 1948 created the Ulster Transport Authority which took over the BCDR on 1 October 1948 and the Northern Counties Committee on 1 April 1949.

On 15 January 1950 the UTA withdrew services on the former BCDR lines between Comber and Newcastle; Ballynahinch Junction and Ballynahinch; and Downpatrick and Ardglass. The Northern Ireland Transport Tribunal had authorised these closures on 15 December 1949.

The UTA withdrew services between Ballymacarrett Junction and Donaghadee on 22 April 1950. The line between Castlewellan and Newcastle remained open until 1 May 1955, served by Great Northern Railway Board trains to and from Banbridge. Once these two sections had been closed, the line between Belfast and Bangor was the only part of the former BCDR that remained open.

When the UTA took it over, the BCDR had 29 locomotives, 181 carriages and 25 other coaching vehicles, 629 wagons mostly covered vans and wagons but also including some 6-wheeled fish vans, and 54 service vehicles.

== Incidents and accidents ==
In the Ballymacarrett rail crash of 1871, on 13 May, 2 died and 55 were injured when a passenger train ran into a derailed goods train at Ballymacarrett Junction. The goods train derailed when a drunken fireman drove the train into an unfinished turnout, fouling the line.

In the Ballymacarrett rail crash, on 10 January 1945, 22 passengers died and 27 were injured when a railmotor car ran into the rear of a conventional train stopped at a signal at Ballymacarrett Junction. The 7.40 a.m. rail motor Holywood to Belfast crashed into the rear of the 7.10 a.m. Bangor to Belfast train. The darkness and local fog were a factor but the driver of the rail motor was held to blame. The Railway had to pay out some £80,000 in compensation, which crippled the company financially, leading to its early nationalisation in 1948.

== Downpatrick and County Down Railway ==
The Downpatrick and County Down Railway (DCDR) operates the only Irish Gauge heritage railways in Northern Ireland on part of the former BCDR Belfast-Newcastle main line. It has fully restored and operates several miles of track, including the famous 'Downpatrick Loop', complete with original restored platform. The DCDR operates four railway stations on the line, one of which was the original BCDR Loop Platform. The railway holds a vast collection of BCDR rolling stock and museum artefacts, the majority of which are on display for the public to enjoy. The DCDR's logo is based on a monogram previously used by the BCDR.

== Preservation ==
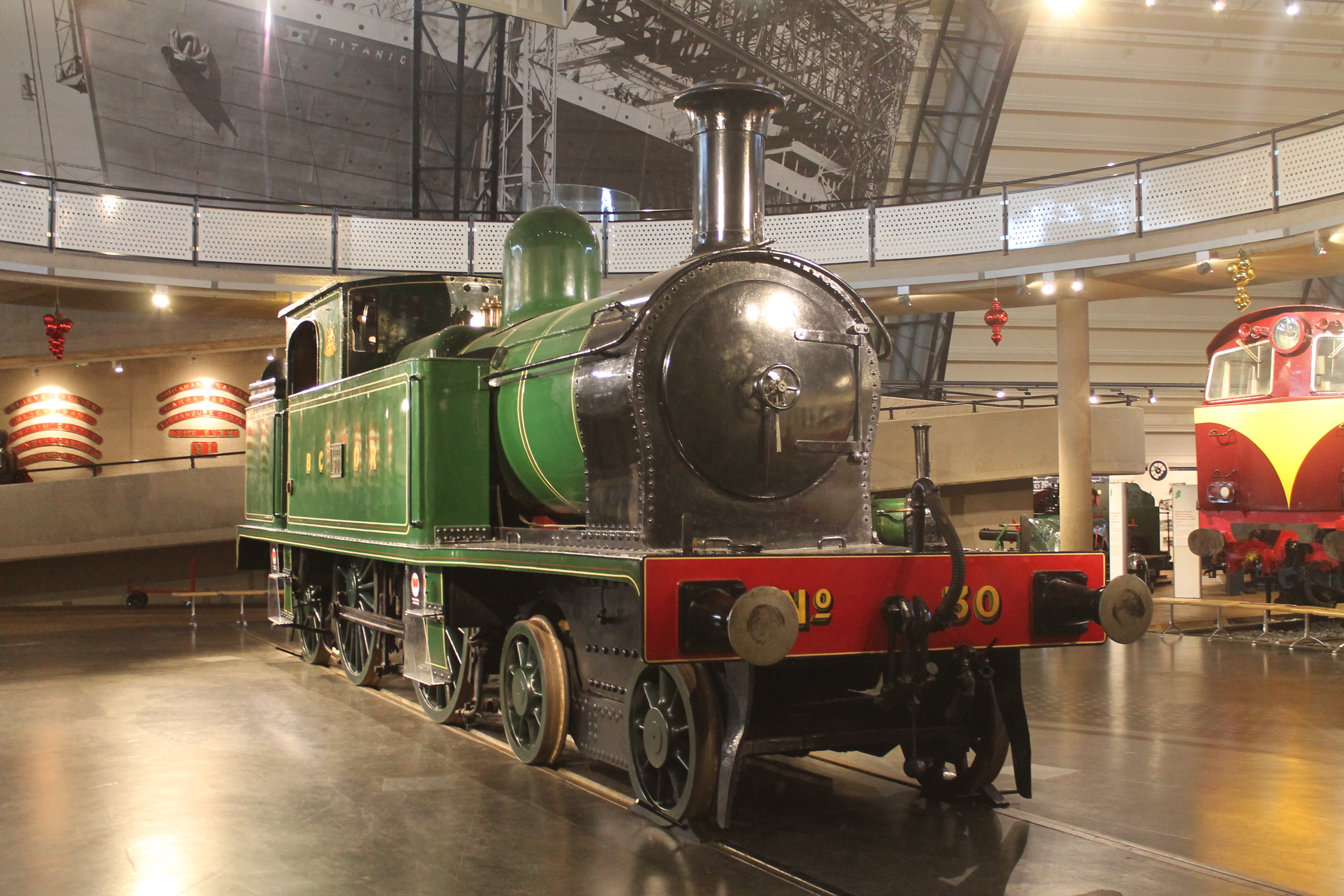
BCDR 4-4-2 tank engine No. 30 at the Ulster Transport Museum

Six carriages that were once owned by the Belfast and County Down Railway have survived into preservation. Among them are two six-wheeled carriages built at Queen's Quay by the BCDR (39 & 154), one of the railway's three railmotors (72), an 1897 composite bogie coach (148/152) and the BCDR's royal saloon (153). All of these are located at the Downpatrick and County Down Railway. So far, bogie coach No. 148/152 and ex-railmotor No. 72 have been fully restored, while No. 153 is part-way through overhaul. The other 2 coaches owned by the railway are awaiting maintenance on site.

- No. 39 - Downpatrick and County Down Railway. Built in 1903 by Queen's Quay. Stored.
- No. 72 - Downpatrick and County Down Railway. Built 1905 by Kitson and Company. Originally a Railmotor. Operational.
- No. 148/152 - Downpatrick and County Down Railway. Built in 1897 (152. Build date for 148 unknown) by Ashbury (both). Operational.
- No. 153 - Downpatrick and County Down Railway. Built in 1897 by Ashbury. Used by Queen Victoria for her Diamond Jubilee. Under restoration.
- No. 154 - Downpatrick and County Down Railway. Built in 1918 by Queen's Quay. Stored.

In addition, one BCDR locomotive has been preserved at the Ulster Transport Museum: BCDR No. 30, which was built in 1901 by Beyer, Peacock & Company. The engine was renumbered 230 by the Ulster Transport Authority in 1951, and preserved by the company for static display. It is one of only 19 remaining 5' 3" gauge steam locomotives left in Ireland.

== After closure ==
Much of the line between Belfast and Newcastle was lifted in the early- to mid-1950s by the Ulster Transport Authority, shortly after the closure of the line. Some of the trackbed was purchased by farmers, while some was later used for walkways: for example, the stretch of former line North of Dundrum. As already mentioned, some of the line was relaid by the Downpatrick and County Down Railway.

The line from Belfast to Comber was converted in the 2000s to The Comber Greenway, a 7-mile (11 km) walk and cycleway.

== Legislation ==
- Belfast and County Down Railway Act 1855
- Belfast and County Down Railway Act 1858
- Belfast and County Down Railway Amendment Act 1860
- Belfast, Holywood and Bangor Railway Act 1860
- Belfast and County Down Railway (Bangor Branch Abandonment) Act 1861
- Downpatrick, Dundrum and Newcastle Railway Act 1866
- Belfast, Holywood and Bangor Railway Act 1863
- Belfast and County Down Railway (Holywood Branch Transfer) Act 1865
- Downpatrick, Dundrum and Newcastle Railway Act 1868
- Downpatrick, Dundrum and Newcastle Railway (Lease) Act 1870
- Belfast, Holywood, and Bangor Railway (Lease) Act 1873
- Belfast and County Down Railway Act 1876
- Belfast, Holywood, and Bangor Railway Act 1876
- Belfast, Holywood and Bangor Railway Act 1881
- Belfast and County Down Railway (Newcastle Transfer) Act 1881
- Belfast and County Down Railway (Bangor Transfer) Act 1884
- Belfast and County Down Railway Act 1891
- Belfast and County Down Railway Act 1900

== Sources and further reading ==
- Coakham, Desmond (1998). The Belfast and County Down Railway of Ireland: An Irish Railway Pictorial. Leicester: Midland Publishing. ISBN 1-85780-076-1.
- IRRS (4 January 2016) [2001]. "Irish Railways: 1946 - 1996 ― NCC". Irish Railway Record Society. Belfast & County Down Railway. Archived from the original on 19 November 2017.*McCutcheon, W.A. (1980). The Industrial Archaeology of Northern Ireland. Belfast: HMSO. ISBN 0337081549.
- Patterson, Edward Mervyn (1982) [1958]. Belfast and County Down Railway. Newton Abbott: David & Charles. ISBN 0-7153-8306-X. OCLC 16552845.
- Pue, R.J.A. (1975). Twenty-five years gone. Millisle: The Belfast & County Down Railway Museum Trust. ISBN 0-905196-00-7.
- Pue, R.J.A. (2009). Large 4-4-2 Tanks of the Belfast & County Down Railway. Steam Locomotives of Irish Railways. Newtownards: The Belfast & County Down Railway Museum Trust. ISBN 978-0-905196-16-9.
- Pue, R.J.A. (2006). Standard 4-4-2 Tanks of the Belfast & County Down Railway. Steam Locomotives of Irish Railways. Newtownards: The Belfast & County Down Railway Museum Trust. ISBN 0-905196-06-6.
