= Ballymacarrett rail crash =

1945 train crash in Belfast, Northern Ireland

Details
- Date: 10 January 1945; 7:50am
- Location: Ballymacarrett
- Coordinates: 54.6033395°N 5.892709°W
- Country: Northern Ireland
- Line: Belfast to Bangor Line
- Operator: Belfast and County Down Railway
- Incident type: Collision
- Cause: Excessive speed; driver error; unsafe operating rules

Statistics
- Trains: 2
- Passengers: Approx. 800
- Deaths: 22
- Injured: 27

The Ballymacarrett rail crash occurred on 10 January 1945 at 7:50am in the Ballymacarrett area of Belfast, County Down, Northern Ireland on the Belfast to Bangor Line of the Belfast and County Down Railway, when a train led by a heavy autotrain driving trailer ran into the back of a stopped passenger train consisting of lightweight wooden coaches. 22 died with 27 injured. It was the worst crash in Northern Ireland since 1889. The cause was found to be carelessness of the driver of the autotrain (also called a railmotor) who was running too fast for conditions. Fog, unsafe railway rules, and possible distraction from passengers all may have contributed to the accident. Old lightweight rolling stock contributed to the great number of injuries and deaths. The accident led to the demise of the railway company which was nationalised three years later.

== Background ==
The Belfast and County Down Railway operated the very busy line from Belfast to Bangor. The heyday of the railway was in the late 1800s. By the end of the First World War, the railway was facing competition from buses and private vehicles and was facing economic pressures. In the 1920s some economy measures were put in place such as replacing manned signal boxes with automatic signals. In the 1930s there was an economic depression which put the company under even greater financial pressure. By the end of the Second World War, the pressures were even worse.

When this railway implemented the automatic signals on this line, they also introduced a unique "Stop and Proceed" rule. This allowed the driver of a train to proceed cautiously into an occupied block after waiting two minutes and sounding the whistle, but without communicating with a signalman.

== Collision ==
There were two trains involved. The first was the 7:10 am from Bangor to Belfast. This was a traditional passenger train consisting of 13 six-wheeled coaches, pulled by 4-6-4 steam locomotive Number 25. The coaches were of an old design with steel and oak undercarriages and light wood coachwork. The train had a seating capacity of 724 and was carrying about 600 passengers. The guard's van was the ninth coach on the train. This had side lights, but the rear coach of the train had only a single red light.

The second train was the 7:40 am railmotor passenger train from Holywood to Belfast. This so-called railmotor was three coaches being pushed by a 2-4-2 tank locomotive, Number 5, which was running bunker first. The lead car was apparently a railmotor coach that had been converted to an autocoach. The driver stood in the front of this car and had primitive controls to control the regulator (throttle) and whistle on the steam engine that was in the back of the train, as well as the train's vacuum brakes. The head car was 27 tons with an all-steel undercarriage. The train had a seating capacity of 186. All seats were taken, and there were a number of standing passengers.

The 7:10 was stopped at the Ballymacarrett station at the outer home signal of the interlocking at Ballymacarrett Junction, which was beyond the station. It was while stopped at this signal that the train was hit. The rear of the train was near The Oval football stadium.

The 7:40 stopped at the Sydenham station for passenger service. When the train was ready to leave, the train was held at an automatic signal due to the track ahead being occupied by the 7:10. The railway's "Stop and Proceed" rule permitted the 7:40 to move ahead cautiously after waiting at the stop signal for two minutes and then sounding the whistle. The 7:40 did so, continuing to the next station, Victoria Park. At this station, there was another signal, unrelated to the automatic signals, instead showing caution relating to the fact that the signal where the 7:10 was already stopped was at danger. This signal at Victoria Park did not remind the 7:40 driver that the block was occupied. Also at this time, it was still dark, and there was a very heavy fog. After receiving and discharging passengers at Victoria Park, the train continued. The driver saw the light in the back of the 7:10 train at only 30 yards away and allegedly tried to stop his train, but the lead car of the 7:40 collided with the rear car of the 7:10.

The heavy steel lead car of the 7:40 rode up over the underframe of the rear wooden coach and ploughed through the entirety of its coachwork and ten feet of the next car's coachwork as well. The passengers in the rear two cars of the 7:10 suffered the vast majority of the deaths and injuries.

Thirteen passengers died at the scene with nine passing from their injuries later all from the 7:10. 23 passengers in the 7:10 and one from the 7:40 were injured along with three crew members.

Rescuers came from the neighbourhood of the crash, including many workers from the nearby Harland and Wolff Shipyard. The rescuers built bonfires to help illuminate the scene and included using the roof of the destroyed coach to help feed the bonfires. Buses also illuminated the scene using their headlights.

== Investigations ==
There were at least three inquiries into the crash: a criminal inquiry against the driver of the 7:40 in April 1945, a collection of several civil cases against the railway, and a Ministry of Commerce investigation by R. Dundas Duncan, the Inspector of Railways for Northern Ireland.

=== Criminal inquiry ===
The driver of the 7:40, Isaac McQuillan, was charged with manslaughter in April 1945 for the death of a passenger: Samuel Wilson. During the hearing, two passengers testified that they were in the driver's compartment. One of the witnesses said there were six passengers in the driver's compartment.

He was found not guilty after four days. During the trial, an expert witness for the defence said the "Stop and Proceed" rule was unheard of in Britain and placed an unfair burden on the driver. Another defence witness, a civil engineer, said the police tests of the braking system found it to be extremely inefficient. He further testified that because the two coaches that collided were of such different construction, this greatly contributed to the severe loss of life on the one with none in the motor coach.

=== Civil cases ===
There were at least 18 civil cases that were consolidated down to one test case for purposes of determination of liability on the part of the railway . The victim used as the test case was James McCoy of Sydenham. On 22 July 1946, this test case was found in favour of the plaintiff who was awarded £250. This allowed damages to be assessed in all the other civil cases.

In March 1947, a damage claim of £50 was dismissed for plaintiff John McCoy, of Holywood because he was travelling on a weekly ticket, and one of the conditions of that ticket was "its holder will have no legal right of action against the company for injury, however caused."

In February 1947, the Railway tried to have its liability in the case of William Redpath of Bangor reduced by the amount of monies received by the victim from charities. The argument was rejected in March.

As of February 1948, cases were still being settled.

=== Ministry of Commerce investigation ===
The public hearing was held on 29 January. Mr. Duncan stated that it was the worst rail crash in Northern Ireland since 1889.

After opening the hearing and asking if anyone present had anything they wished to say and no one offering, Mr. Duncan declared that he would hear the evidence in private. After a protest from a member of the public, Mr. Duncan explained that the purpose of the hearing was to learn what could be changed on the railways to prevent future accidents and was not to fix blame. Mr. Duncan said he would collect evidence in private to collect evidence with the greatest candour possible.

The final report was released five and a half months after the accident on 2 June 1945.

The report found that the 7:40 railmotor train had a few shortcomings related to its equipment. The train could be stopped faster if it were running engine first because the driver could use the brake valve in the engine instead of the somewhat less effective brake valve in the autocoach. Also, the way that the mechanical linkages were arranged that connected the regulator control from the driving trailer was somewhat unreliable in that there was play in the system that prevented the regulator from being opened fully. There was also an issue where a connecting pin in the regulator linkage was prone to falling out.

More importantly, the driving coach had a compartment for the driver separated by a sliding door from the main part of the coach. When loading and offloading passengers, one of the two doors for the passengers was through the driver's compartment. It was revealed that the dividing door was rarely closed by this driver. Furthermore, the driver was shaky in his testimony regarding whether there were, in fact, any passengers in his compartment when the accident occurred.

It turned out that the reason the 7:10 was still stopped was that there was a faulty signal. The signalman at the interlocking had tried to clear the signal to allow the train to continue, but it was stuck in the danger position due to wet or frosty weather causing the mechanism to stick. The signalman was on his way from the signal box at Ballymacarrett Junction to the 7:10 train to signal it in person when the accident occurred.

The report commented on and criticised the fact that the signal system was in need of modernization and that the rules that permitted this accident to occur should be made more stringent. It pointed out that elsewhere, telephones are provided at signals so that drivers can report signals holding them and receive clear instructions on whether it is safe to proceed.

The report concluded that the 7:40 was running too fast for conditions and at considerably more than the 8 to 10 mph that the witnesses claimed. The damage done was simply inconsistent with a low speed. The driver of the 7:40 was solely blamed for the accident for running at too high a speed for the conditions and the signals received. The author of the report indicates that there seemed to be no braking action before the collision. The driver was also criticised for the possibility of allowing passengers in the crowded train to stand in his compartment that may have provided a distraction.

== Aftermath ==
Rail service was restored very quickly. One of the two lines was back in operation by 11 am the same morning, with full service restored by 5 pm.

The job of telling the families of the victims about the accident and the loss of their loved ones fell to the Station Master of Bangor with his assistant, who were accompanied by a police officer. He was so troubled with at least one family that he was unable to talk, and the policeman had to speak for him.

Since most of the dead and injured were from Bangor, the Mayor of Bangor organised a disaster relief fund drive the night after the accident to help the families who suffered losses. The drive raised some £20,000, which is considered extraordinary for the time given, the hardships that the area and the entire British Commonwealth had been through with the Second World War.

Push-pull trains were withdrawn from service; the Stop and Proceed rule was removed, and lineside telephones were installed after the accident.

The Railway had to pay out £75,000 in compensation, which crippled it financially since it was already in a weak financial condition and had no insurance to cover an accident such as this. It was nationalised a few years later in 1948.
