= Tillysburn railway station =

Railway station in Northern Ireland

General information
- Location: Belfast, Northern Ireland
- Coordinates: 54.618988°N 5.863261°W

History
- Opened: 1848
- Closed: 1945
- Original company: Belfast and County Down Railway
Location

Tillysburn railway station was a railway station on the Bangor line of the Belfast and County Down Railway. It opened in 1848, closed in 1945 and was located 2 miles 48 chains (4.2 km) from the Queens Quay terminus.

As of the 2000s, the site was proposed as a station to serve the area between Belfast and Holywood on the Bangor line. The "Belfast Metropolitan Area Plan 2015", published in 2014, proposed that the station be used as part of a rail link to both the Holywood Exchange retail development and George Best Belfast City Airport. As of 2009, it was reported that the station would serve the planned national stadium and as a park and ride facility for the areas around Holywood.

The pressure group, Rail 21, in a submission to the BMAP plan, raised objections about what the new station was expected to do, in that the proposed site was a similar distance from the airport terminal to Sydenham station. Instead, the pressure group proposed a dedicated airport station, with Tillysburn used for the retail development and as a park and ride.

Preceding station	NI Railways	Following station
	Proposed	
Sydenham	Northern Ireland Railways; Belfast-Bangor	Holywood
