= 1871 Ballymacarrett rail crash =

Railway incident in Belfast

Details
- Date: 13 May 1871; 8:30pm
- Location: Ballymacarrett
- Coordinates: 54.601935°N 5.901845°W
- Country: Ireland, now modern day Northern Ireland
- Line: Belfast–Comber main line
- Operator: Belfast and County Down Railway
- Incident type: Collision
- Cause: Derailment caused by intoxicated fireman.

Statistics
- Trains: 2
- Deaths: 2
- Injured: 55

The Ballymacarrett rail crash of 1871 occurred on 13 May 1871 at the Ballymacarrett Junction of the Belfast and County Down Railway in Belfast, Ireland, which at the time was in the United Kingdom of Great Britain and Ireland. Two people were killed with 55 injured. The cause was a derailment caused by an intoxicated fireman who drove a steam locomotive with four goods wagons off the end of incomplete set of points at Ballymacarrett Junction blocking the main line. Another train came along and struck the first.
