= Ballymacarrett Junction =

Overview
- Locale: Ballymacarrett, Belfast, County Down, Northern Ireland
- Coordinates: 54°36′06″N 5°54′30″W
- Connecting lines: Queen's Quay to Bangor * Queen's Quay to Comber * Belfast Central to Bangor

History
- Opened: 1850
- Closed: 1994

Technical
- Track gauge: 5 ft 3 in (1,600 mm)

Ballymacarrett Junction was a railway switching point on the Belfast and County Down Railway in the Ballymacarrett area of Eastern Belfast, in modern-day Northern Ireland. It was located near the present-day Titanic Quarter railway station.

== History ==
The first track, built around 1848, ran from Belfast Queen's Quay to Holywood. On 6 May 1850, the area became a junction, curving Southeast to Dundonald to become part of the main line of the BCDR.

In 1871, another spur came in from the South to the West end of the junction, constituting the Belfast Central Railway connection. The junction continued with this basic configuration for nearly 80 years. On 13 May, while the junction was under construction, an accident occurred, killing two passengers.

On 10 January 1945, an accident took place on the Bangor line, about 4,000 feet (1,200 m) East of the junction resulting in 22 fatalities and 27 injuries. The accident is blamed on a combination of excess speed and poor visibility.

On 22 April 1950, the main line spur to the East was closed for revenue service, and in the same year, the Newcastle route was closed.

On 10 April 1976, revenue service ceased at Queen's Quay. Instead, services ran from the new Belfast Central station to Bangor. Today, this route from Belfast to Bangor is the only existing operative line over the former Belfast and County Down Railway.

The Titanic Quarter stop was added 9 May 1977, known at the time as Bridge End.

In 1994, the original Northern entrance on the west end that connected to Queen's Quay was removed due to the decommissioning of its maintenance area.
