= Ballymacarrett railway station =

Railway station in Belfast, Northern Ireland

Ballymacarrett
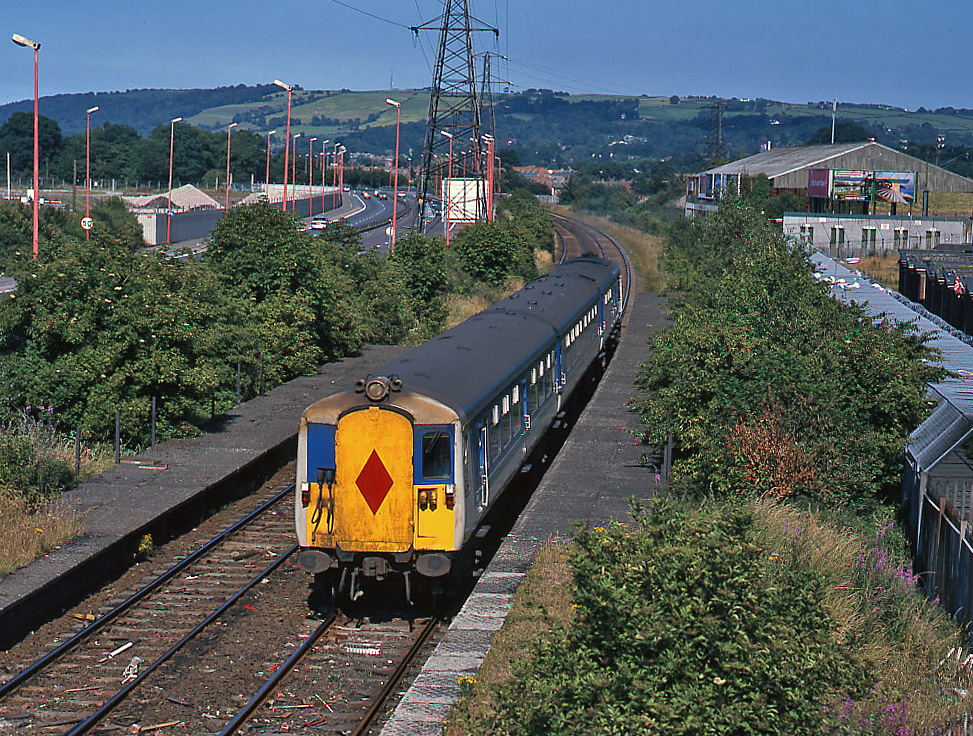
- NIR Class 80 train passing the site of Ballymacarrett station in 2000.

General information
- Location: Belfast, Belfast City; Northern Ireland
- Coordinates: 54.60284°N 5.89559°W
- Platforms: 2

Other information
- Status: Disused

History
- Post-grouping: Northern Ireland Railways

Key dates
- 1905: Station opened
- 1977: Station closed
Location

Ballymacarrett railway station (also known as Ballymacarrett halt) was a railway halt that served the townland of Ballymacarrett in east Belfast.

== History ==
The station was opened by the Belfast and County Down Railway on 1 May 1905 and was the first stop on the branch line to Bangor.

Following the closure of the Queen's Quay terminus in 1976, and the reconnection of the Bangor Line to the Dublin Line via Belfast Lanyon Place formally Belfast Central, Ballymacarrett station was closed on 9 May 1977 and replaced by the nearby Bridge End station, which was renamed "Titanic Quarter" in 2012.

== Service ==
Preceding station	NI Railways	Following station
Queen's Quay	Northern Ireland Railways; Belfast-Bangor	Victoria Park
	Historical railways	
Queen's Quay; Line and station closed.	Belfast and County Down Railway; Belfast-Holywood-Bangor	Victoria Park; Line open, station closed.
