= Titanic Quarter =

Dockland regeneration zone in Belfast

Coordinates: 54°36′24.51″N 5°54′20.84″W

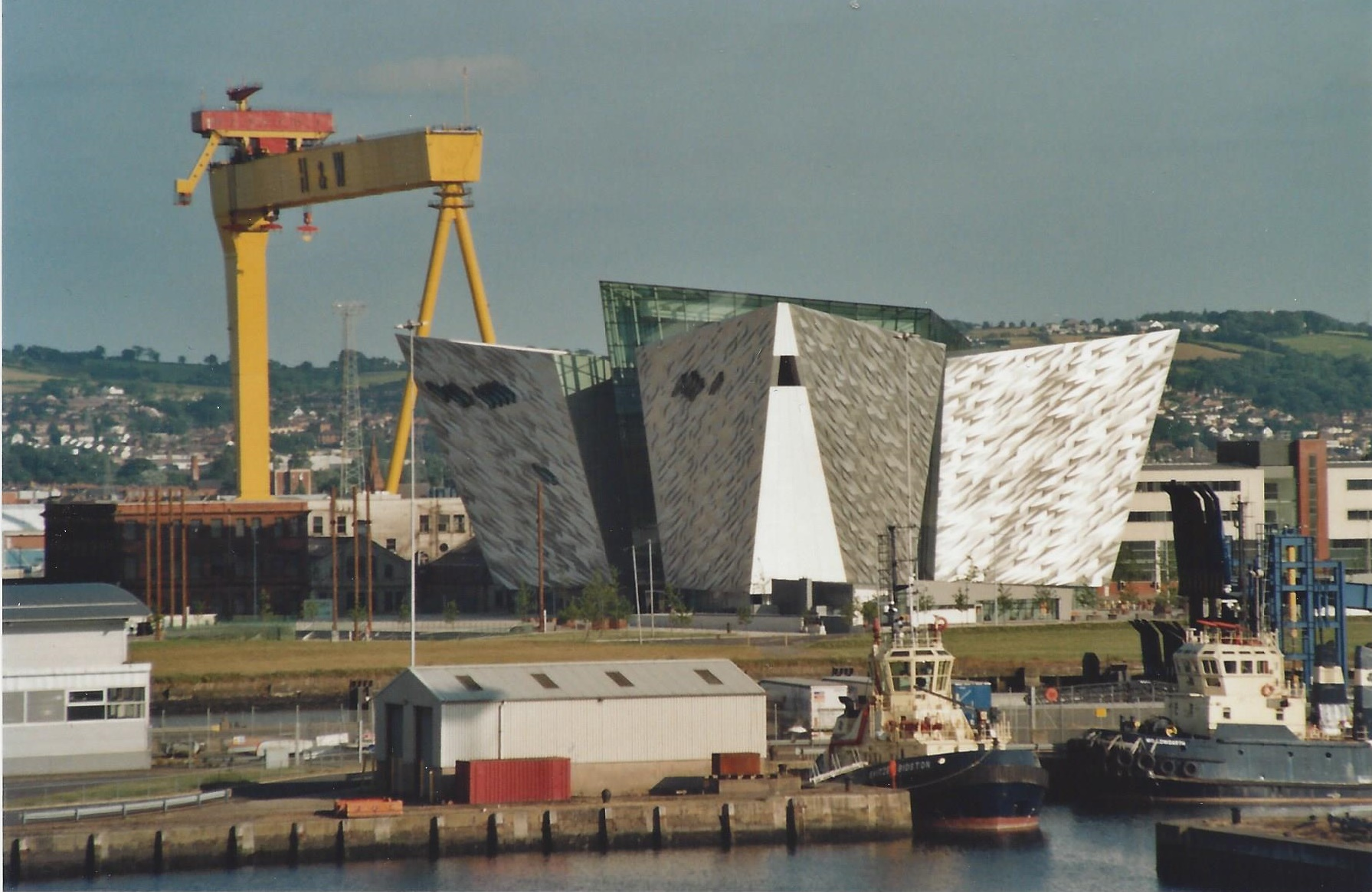
Titanic Museum in Belfast Harbour (2013)

Titanic Quarter in Queen's Island, Belfast, Northern Ireland, is a large-scale waterfront regeneration, comprising historic maritime landmarks, film studios, education facilities, apartments, a riverside entertainment district, and the world's largest Titanic-themed attraction centered on land in Belfast Harbour, known until 1995 exclusively as Queen's Island, and initially, Dargan's Island. The 185-acre (75 ha) site, previously occupied by part of the Harland & Wolff shipyard, is named after the company's, and the city's, most famous product, RMS Titanic. Titanic Quarter is part of the Dublin-based group, Harcourt Developments, which has held the development rights since 2003.

== Dargan Island / Queen's Island ==
Prior to the developments of the Titanic Quarter, the island was initially named ‘Dargan’s Island’ after engineer William Dargan who developed the area. A deep channel was cut through the mudflats of the River Lagan, the material excavated from the cut was used to form the artificial Dargan's Island. It was later renamed to Queen's Island when Queen Victoria visited Belfast in 1849. The island's first use was as a people's park, with a zoo, a Crystal Palace, gardens, and a bathing pond. The site of the Titanic Quarter didn't replace the name of Queen's Island but rather rebranded as such. The townland of Queen's Island is unchanged. This is because Titanic Quarter is a part of the Queen's Island townland.

=== Industrial usage ===
In 1853 the Harbour Commissioners leased land on the island to Robert Hickson, who hired Edward Harland as manager. In 1861 Edward Harland and Gustav Wolff established Harland and Wolff shipyard. 1875, Harland and Wolff eomployed 1,000 workers. Wooden lighthouses were erected in the late 1800s to assist the mariners as they came in and out of the Belfast docks as Belfast's coal and steel industries grew.

The Abercorn Basin and Hamilton Dock were established in 1876 for the growing shipbuilding industry. The Abercorn Basin, also known as Belfast Marina, was used for the transportation of coal onto cargo boats, the presence of swan-necked cranes were common during the 20th century. Harland & Wolff shipyard used Abercorn Basin to launch many of ships for White Star Line.

Queen's Quay, at the time was known as 'Coal Quay.' From the mid-19th century, the area serviced Belfast's coal, freight and scrap metal trade. John Kelly Limited, a coal merchant used Queen's Island for their business from the 1840s up until the 1990s. The quay featured the terminus of Belfast and County Down Railway, Queen's Quay Station.

In the 21st-century, the north side of Queen's Island is used by Harland & Wolff and Clearway scrapyard.

== Completed projects ==
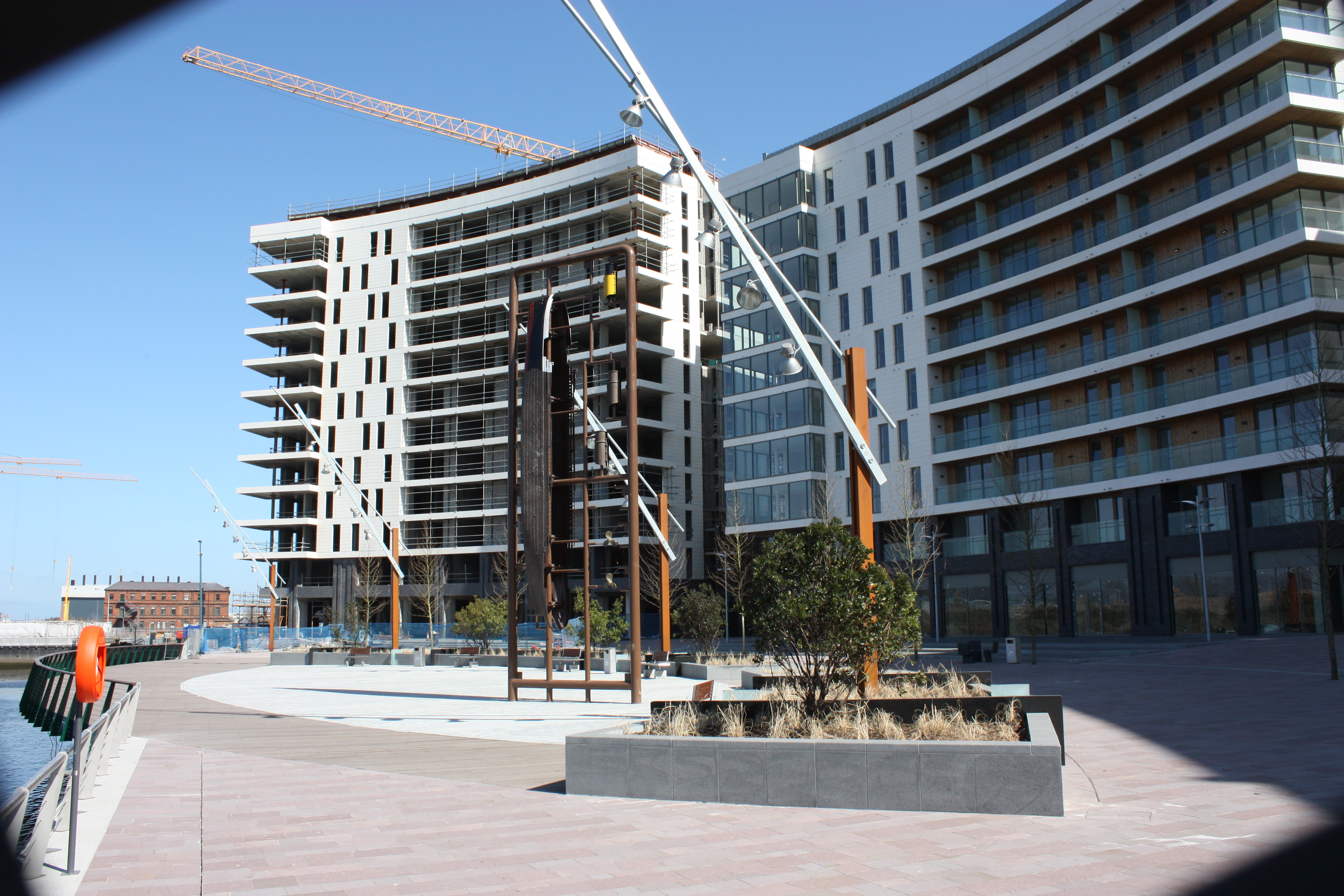
Apartments and sculpture in the Quarter in 2010

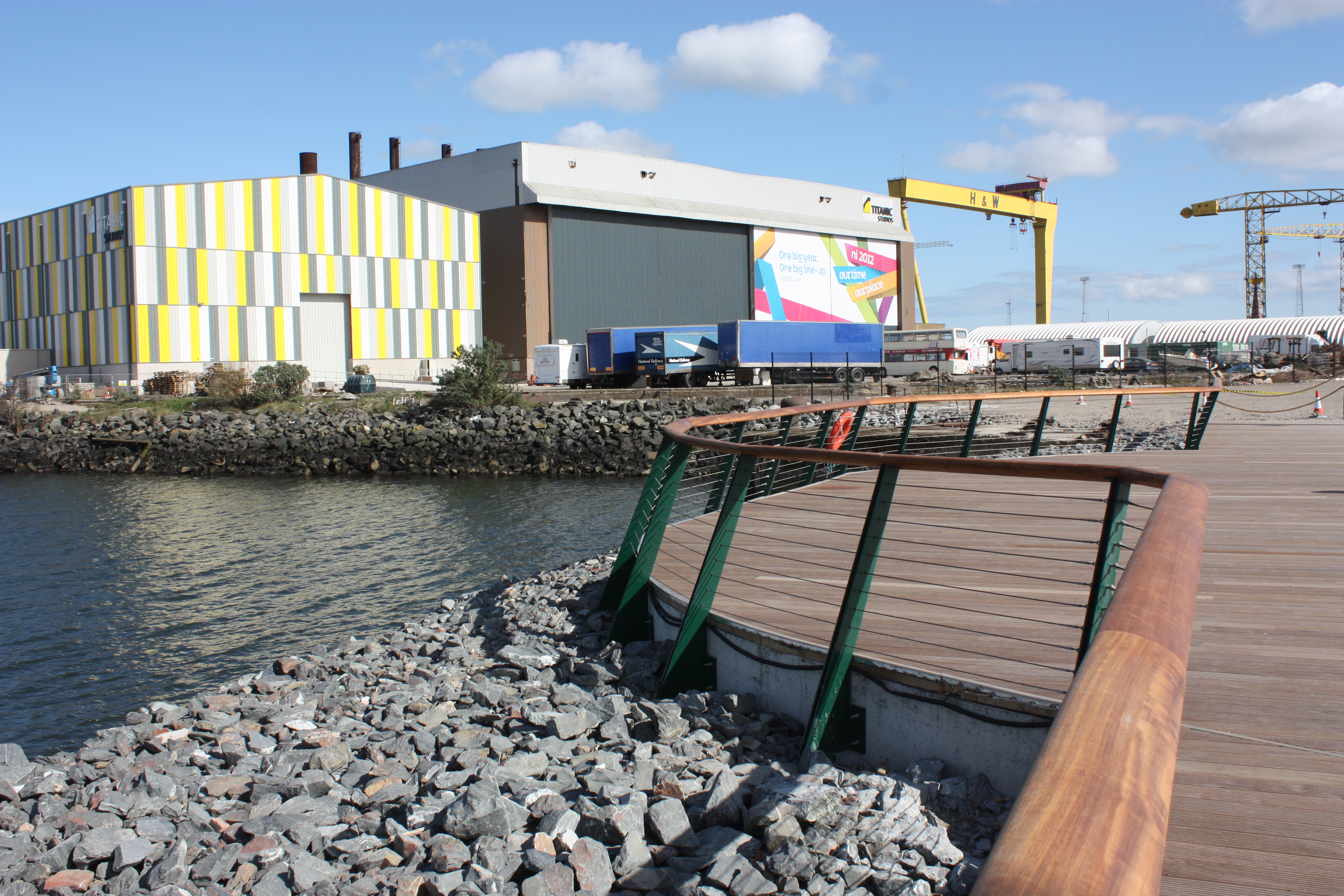
View towards Titanic Studios

The largest development is the £101 million Titanic Belfast visitor attraction which holds the record for the island's largest ever single concrete pour (4,300 cubic metres) for its foundations. The building opened on 31 March 2012 and attracted over 800,000 visitors in its first year. The attraction is owned by a charitable foundation. The architects said that "we have created an architectural icon that captures the spirit of the shipyards, ships, water crystals, ice, and the White Star Line's logo. Its architectural form cuts a skyline silhouette that has been inspired by the very ships that were built on this hallowed ground."

In 2005 the Catalyst Inc opened, a science park affiliated closely with Queen's University Belfast, the University of Ulster and Titanic Studios (aka the Paint Hall Studios, a film studio originally created by film producer Jo Gilbert that was used in the production of films including Tom Hanks's City of Ember starring Bill Murray, Your Highness, HBO's television series Game of Thrones and A Knight of the Seven Kingdoms).

The £30 million headquarters of the Public Record Office of Northern Ireland (PRONI) opened at 2 Titanic Boulevard in April 2011. PRONI is the national archive for Northern Ireland and holds records dating from 1219.

In September 2011, the largest education facility in Northern Ireland, the Belfast Institute for Further and Higher Education (now Belfast Metropolitan College), opened a £211 million campus in Titanic Quarter.

Belfast Harbour Marina opened in the centre of Titanic Quarter in 2009 as part of the Belfast Tall Ships Festival. Located in the Abercorn Basin, it features 40 berths for leisure craft, it was funded by the Northern Ireland Tourist Board and Belfast Tall Ships 2009 Ltd. It is the forerunner to a future 200 berth marina in the Titanic Quarter.

In November 2010 the first hotel, a Premier Inn with onsite restaurant, opened in Titanic Quarter. Over 40 new jobs were created.

In 2013, the SS Nomadic was restored, over 100 years after it was originally built. It sits in Hamilton Dock. It is the last remaining vessel of White Star Line. The iron caisson of the dry dock, built by Workman, Clark & Co. Ltd. in 1888 is awaiting restoration.

In September 2017 a second hotel, Titanic Hotel Belfast, opened in the former Harland & Wolff Headquarters and Drawing Offices. The hotel includes artwork from the drawing offices by former Harland & Wolff worker, and later artist, Colin H Davidson.

Belfast Audi, operated by the Agnew Group, opened its new headquarters in November 2010. Located at 80 Sydenham Road, it created 115 new jobs.

The first residential development in Titanic Quarter was completed in December 2010. The Arc comprises apartments and shops, and is located adjacent to Abercorn Basin.

== Sport ==
In September 2014, Northern Irish boxer Carl Frampton won the IBF world super-bantamweight title in a specially constructed outdoor arena in the Titanic Quarter in front of 16,000 fans, Northern Ireland's largest ever boxing crowd.

== Transport ==
The Titanic Quarter is served by Translink Metro Services 94, 600A and 600B bus services, which run from Donegall Square North (Across from City Hall) to Holywood Exchange, Catalyst Inc, and Belfast City Airport, via The SSE Arena, Queens Road, Titanic Belfast and Belfast Harbour Estate East.

The area is also served by NI Railways services to Titanic Quarter (Bridge End) station, which is the first station heading towards Bangor on the Belfast–Bangor line from Lanyon Place.

The G2 service, operated by the Belfast Rapid Transit System (Glider) also terminates at Titanic Quarter.

== See also ==
- Belfast Quarters
- HMS Caroline
- SS Nomadic
- Catalyst Inc
- List of tourist attractions in Ireland
