= Public Record Office of Northern Ireland =

Northern Irish archival institution

Coordinates: 54.604°N 5.911°W

Agency overview
- Formed: 1924
- Jurisdiction: Northern Ireland, Government of the United Kingdom
- Headquarters: 2 Titanic Boulevard, Titanic Quarter, Belfast, BT3 9HQ
- Minister responsible: Gordon Lyons, Minister for Communities
- Parent department: Department for Communities (DfC)
- Key document: Public Records Act (NI) 1923
- Website: www.nidirect.gov.uk/proni/

The Public Record Office of Northern Ireland (PRONI) is situated in Belfast, Northern Ireland. It is a division within the Engaged Communities Group of the Department for Communities (DfC).

The Public Record Office of Northern Ireland is distinguished from other archival institutions in the United Kingdom by its unique combination of private and official records. The Record Office is not the Northern Ireland equivalent or imitation of any Great Britain or Republic of Ireland archival institution. It combines the functions and responsibilities of a range of institutions: it is at the same time Public Record Office, manuscripts department of a national library, county record office for the six counties of Northern Ireland, and holder of a large range of private records. This range of remit, embracing, among others, central and local government, the churches and the private sector, is unique to Northern Ireland.

== History ==
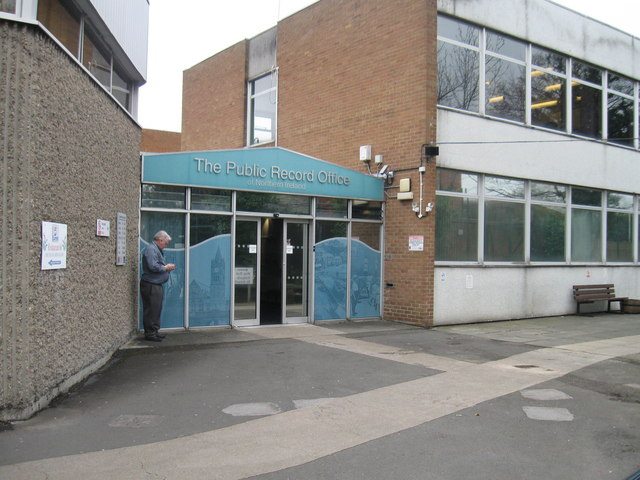
PRONI at Balmoral Avenue

PRONI was established by the Public Records Act (Northern Ireland), 1923. The new body opened to the public on Monday 3 March 1924 on the fourth floor of a former linen warehouse in central Belfast (at Murray Street). The immediate challenge was to identify and preserve surrogates of records lost in Dublin during the Four Courts fire on 30 June 1922. The first Deputy Keeper, Dr David A. Chart (born in Lucknow but educated in his mother's native County Kilkenny), successfully replaced many of these records by approaching solicitors, business people, politicians, churches and the landed aristocracy.

The success of Chart's acquisition policy meant that PRONI needed more storage space. In April 1933, the office moved to a new central Belfast location, the first floor of the new Royal Courts of Justice in Chichester Street. However, it was not until 1965 that the Ministry of Finance for Northern Ireland would approve an actual purpose built repository. This new building, opened in 1972, was at Balmoral Avenue in South Belfast and was the first new record office building to be built in the UK since the Public Record Office in London was erected in 1838.

Between 1924 and 1982, PRONI was part of the Ministry (later Department) of Finance for Northern Ireland. The functions were then transferred to the Department of the Environment for Northern Ireland (the DoE), and, in 1995, PRONI became an executive agency within the DoE. With the restoration of devolved government in 1999, PRONI became an agency within the new Department of Culture, Arts and Leisure (DCAL; pronounced as 'Dee-Kal'). The department brought together for the first time overall responsibility for libraries, museums and archives. As part of the implementation of the Review of Public Administration, PRONI ceased to be an agency in 2006 and became a division within the core department. On 9 May 2016, PRONI became a division within the Engaged Communities Group as part of the newly created Department for Communities (DfC).

== Relocation to Titanic Quarter ==
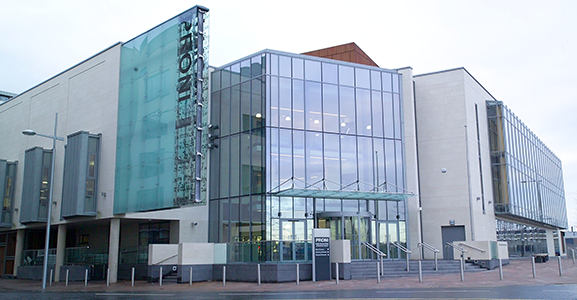
PRONI at Titanic Quarter

In March 2011, PRONI reopened in new purpose-built premises at 2 Titanic Boulevard, BT3 9HQ, in the Titanic Quarter of Belfast, approximately one mile from the city centre. The £29 million new headquarters includes a larger public search room, a reading room with seats for 78 users (most of which have access to power for laptops), a wifi cafe, microfilm readers, self-service digital cameras for digital copying, electronic information points, public art integrated into the fabric of the building, lecture theatre facilities, and dedicated exhibition space.

PRONI is easily accessed from Belfast City Hall via the Metro 26, 26A and 26B bus services. The Belfast Rapid Transport Glider Service - G2 also serves Titanic Quarter and operates daily every 10 minutes to and from Wellington Place. PRONI is in close proximity to the Titanic Quarter railway station (formerly Bridge End) and George Best Belfast City Airport.

Titanic Quarter is also home to leading tourist attractions including Titanic Belfast, HMS Caroline, SS Nomadic, The O2, Titanic Exhibition Centre and Titanic Studios (aka the Paint Hall Studios) where Game of Thrones was filmed.

== Current organisation ==
=== Records ===
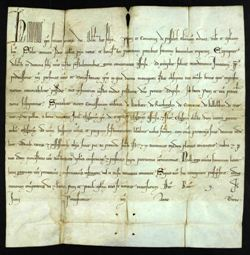
Papal bull issued by Honorius III in 1219

PRONI currently holds 54 kilometres of records. These records date largely from c.1600 to the present day but a few date as far back as the early 13th century, with the oldest document being a bull of Pope Honorius III, dated 1219. Records range from public documents, such as those created by the NI government departments, to private records, such as letters or diaries.

The records at PRONI relate chiefly to present day Northern Ireland. The office holds a number of records relating to other parts of the island of Ireland which have been received from private depositors and include amongst others: the Kenmare Papers of County Kerry; the Lissadell Papers of County Sligo; and Conolly Papers of County Kildare.

=== Access to records ===
There is no entry fee for access to records. New visitors must produce photographic proof of identity in order to register and use the research facilities. Anyone over 16 can register as a PRONI visitor.

The collection at PRONI can be accessed by the electronic catalogue. Documents are ordered using the onsite ordering system in the PRONI Search Room and are produced in the PRONI Reading Room. Visitors can order up to five documents at a time. Since December 2016, PRONI has allowed visitors to copy many records using their own cameras.

PRONI also provides direct access to the most up to date births, marriages and deaths database hosted by General Register Office (Northern Ireland).

In September 2011, the Northern Ireland Assembly accepted a Legislative Consent Motion to reduce the time limit for release of official records from 30 years to 20 years ("the 20-year Rule"). This is underpinned by the Freedom of Information Act 2000 and the amendments made to it by the Protection of Freedoms Act 2012. The 20 Year Rule is being phased in over 10 years, with two years' worth of records being reviewed and released each year.

=== Online records ===
The PRONI website supports a number of free online resources including

- PRONI electronic catalogue;
- a searchable wills database which contains details of testamentary papers, 1858–1965;
- valuation records, 1864–1933;
- historic Ordnance Survey maps, 1832-1996;
- fully indexed and searchable Ulster Covenant signatories of 1912;
- Northern Ireland street directories, 1819–1900;
- pre-1840 Freeholders Registers and Poll Books;
- links to PRONI records on Flickr;
- the Conflict Archive on the Internet (CAIN);
- PRONI Web Archive, preserving a selection of Northern Ireland's websites.

=== Events programme ===
PRONI delivers a programme of events, talks, conferences, book launches and exhibitions over the course of the year. Many of which are in conjunction with partner institutions and other DfC sponsored bodies. Details can be found on the PRONI website or by subscribing to the monthly PRONI Express.

=== PRONI on social media ===
PRONI makes available filmed presentations, lectures and conferences on The PRONI YouTube channel. These cover a wide range of subjects including amongst others: family and local history, marking centenaries, culture, wars and conflicts, migration and the Plantation of Ulster.

== See also ==
- List of Government departments and agencies in Northern Ireland
