= Victoria Park railway station (Northern Ireland) =

Railway station in Belfast, Northern Ireland

Victoria Park
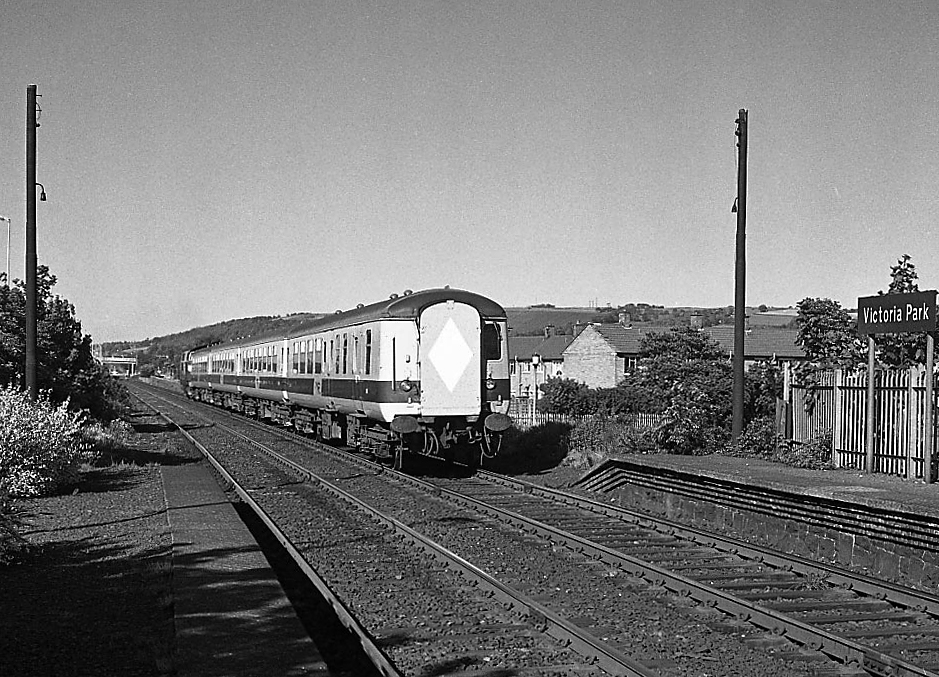
- Train approaching Victoria Park station in 1985.

General information
- Location: Belfast, Belfast City; Northern Ireland
- Coordinates: 54.605191°N 5.886336°W
- Platforms: 2

Other information
- Status: Disused

History
- Post-grouping: Northern Ireland Railways

Key dates
- 1905: Station opened
- 1988: Station closed
Location
- Location within Northern Ireland

Victoria Park railway station served the area around Victoria Park in east Belfast.

== History ==
The station was opened by the Belfast and County Down Railway on 1 May 1905. It saw little use during its lifetime, and by the time it was closed by Northern Ireland Railways in 1988, few trains were stopping.

Victoria Park itself is still accessible by rail from the nearby Sydenham station.

== Service ==
Preceding station	NI Railways	Following station
Bridge End	Northern Ireland Railways; Belfast-Bangor	Sydenham
	Historical railways	
Ballymacarrett; Line open, station closed	Belfast and County Down Railway; Belfast-Bangor	Sydenham; Line and station open

== See also ==
- List of parks and gardens in Belfast
