= Holywood Exchange =

Retail development in Belfast, Northern Ireland

Coordinates: 54.6257°N 5.8591°W

Location of Holywood Exchange

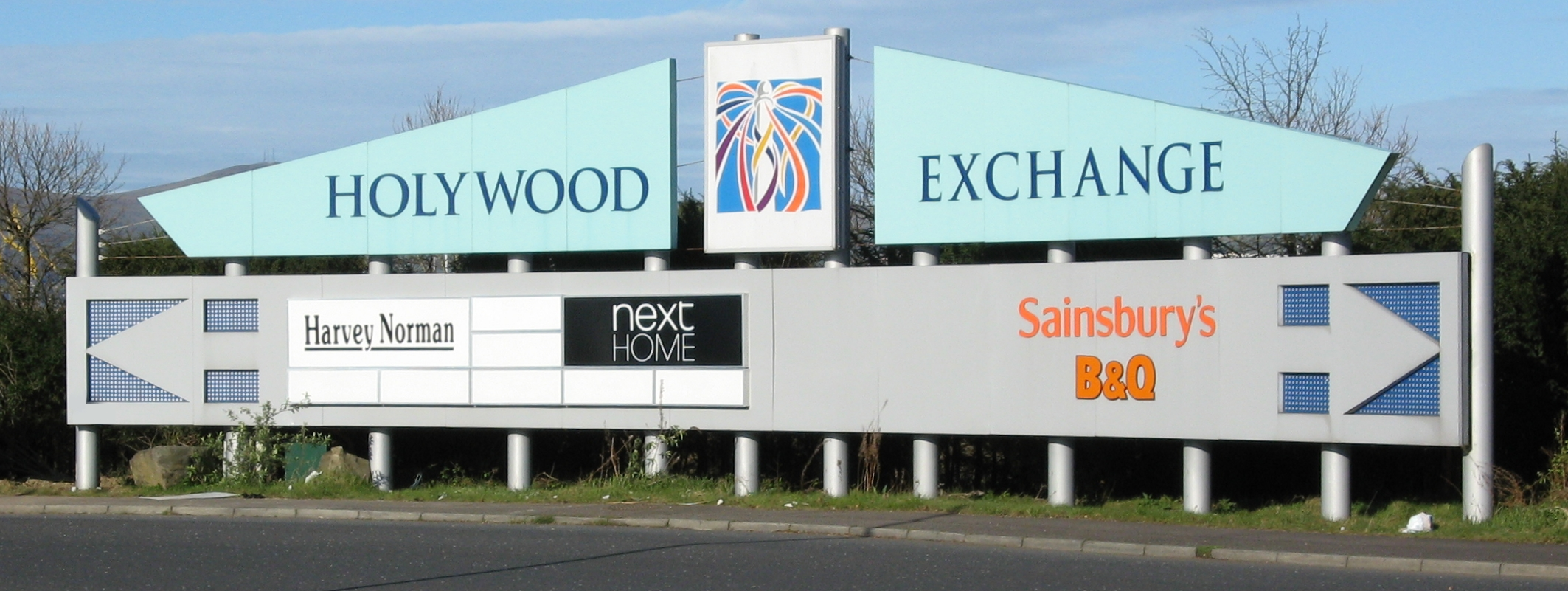
Entrance sign to Holywood Exchange, 2009

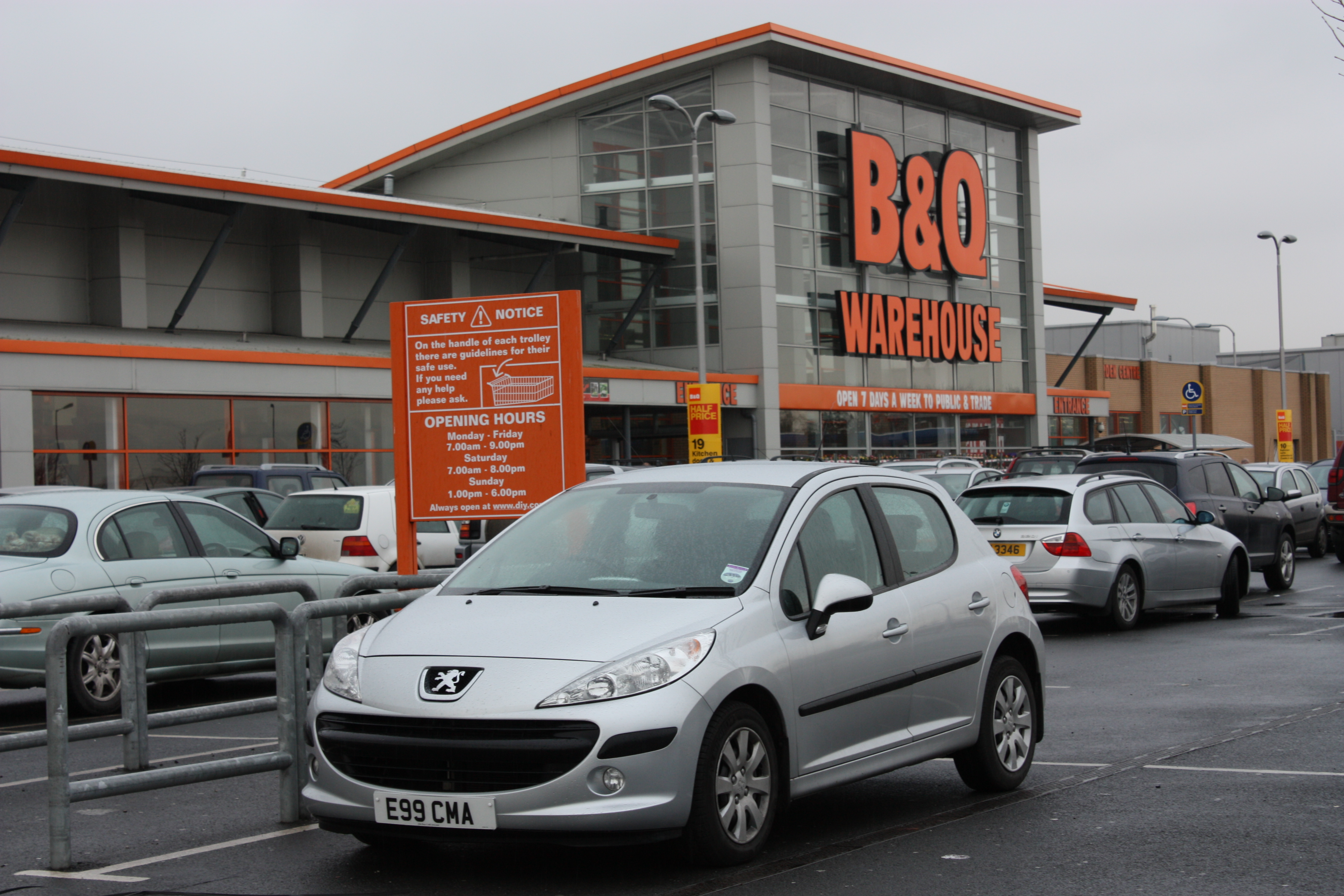
B&Q, Holywood Exchange, 2010

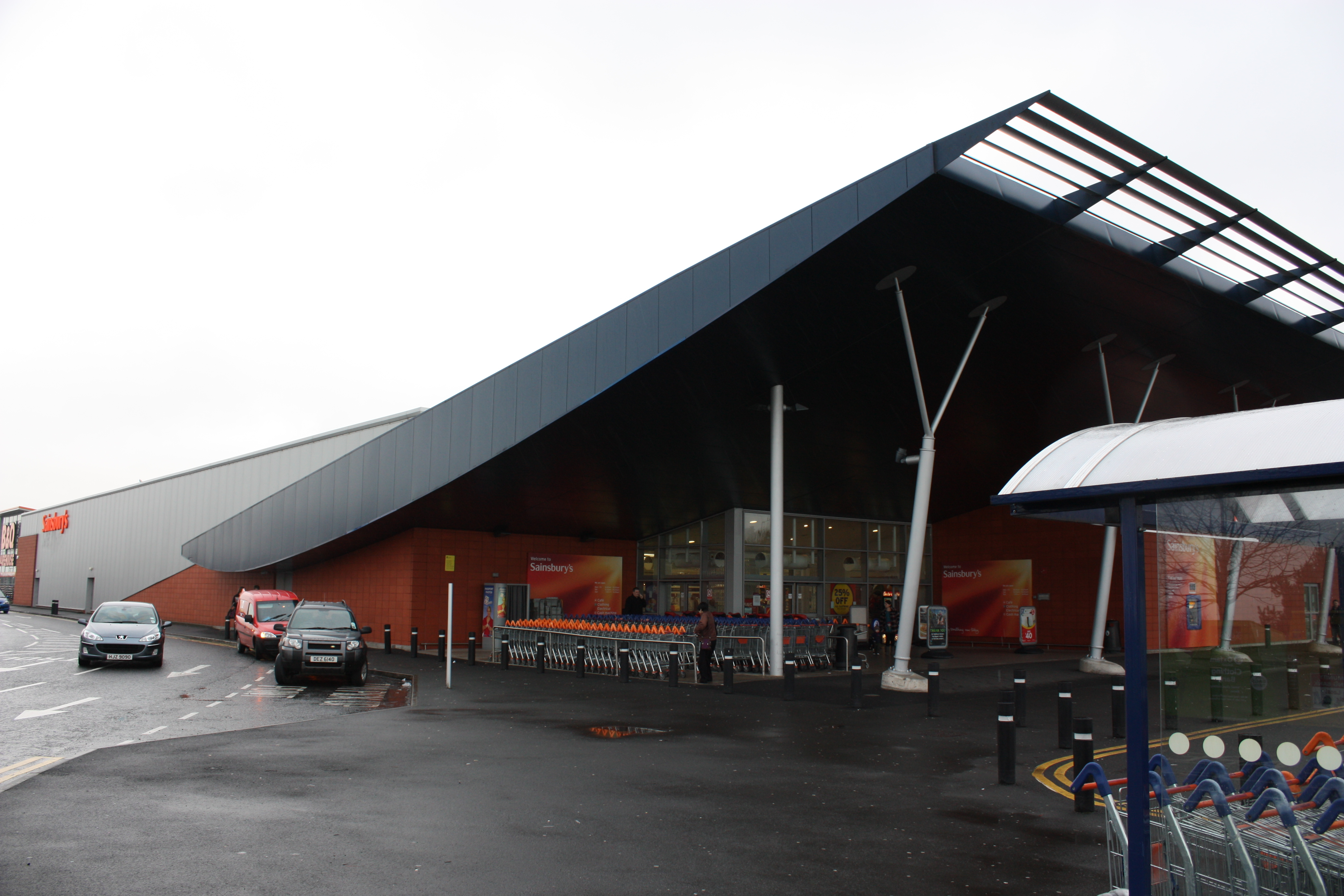
Sainsbury's, Holywood Exchange, 2010

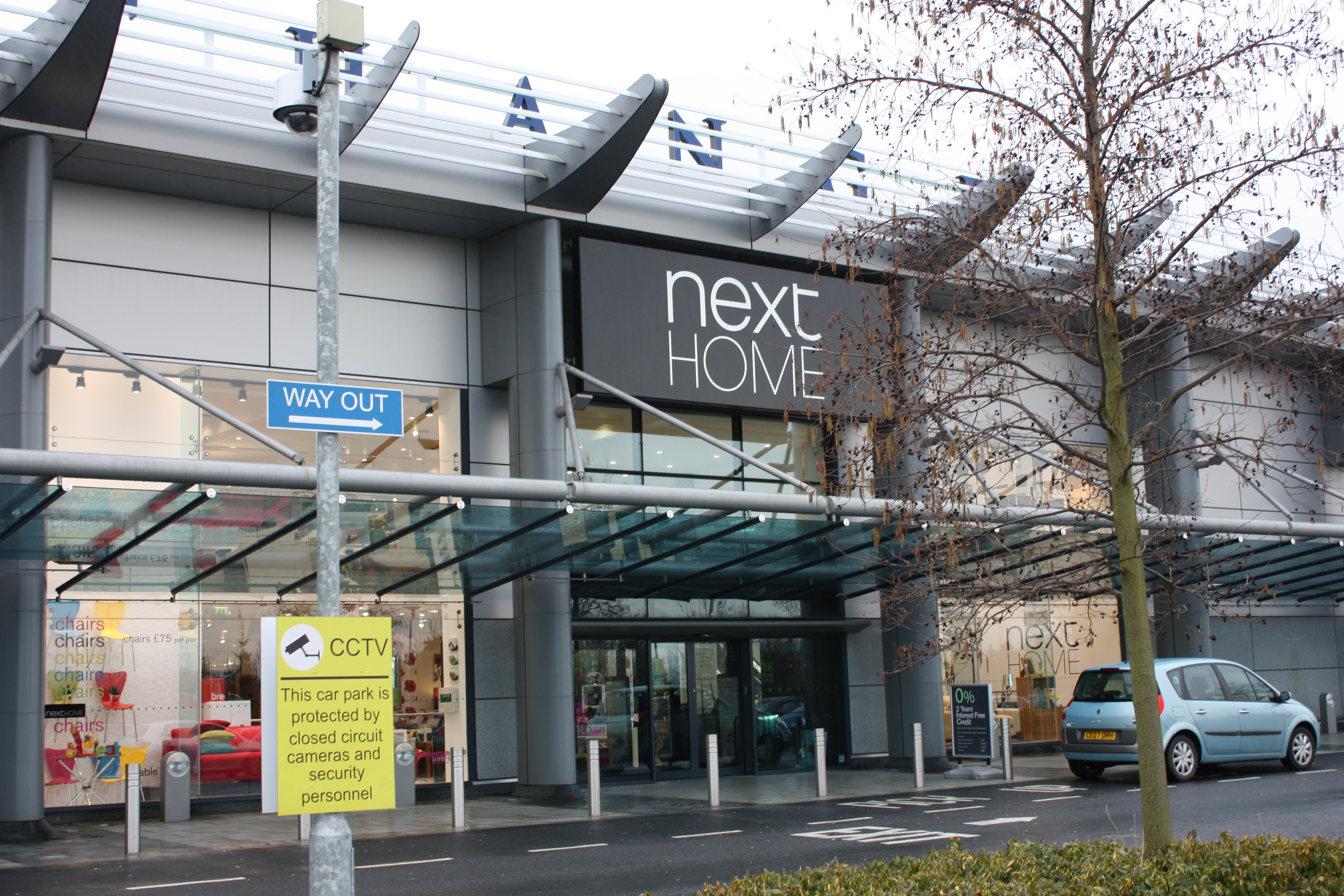
Next Home, Holywood Exchange, 2010

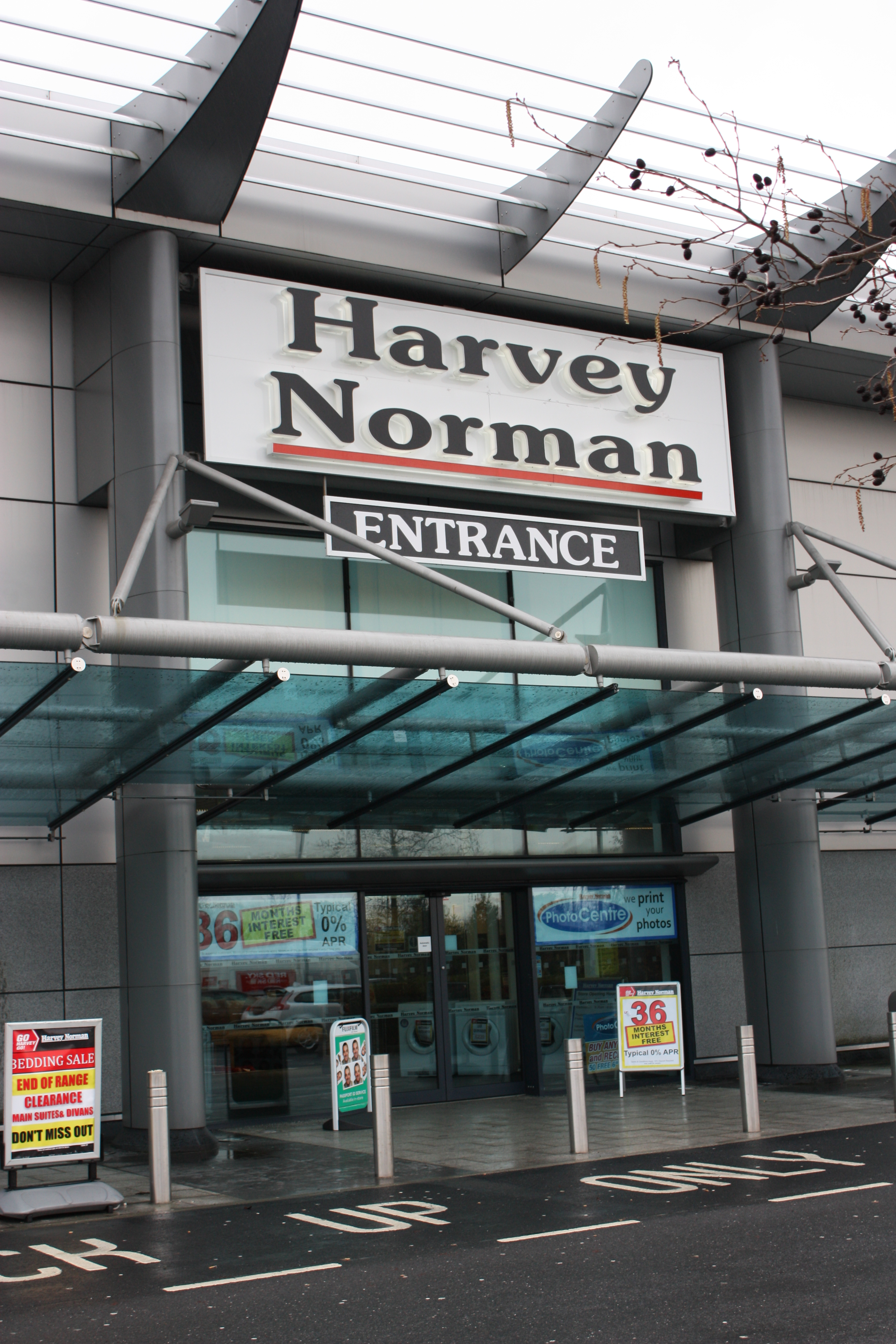
Harvey Norman, Holywood Exchange, 2010

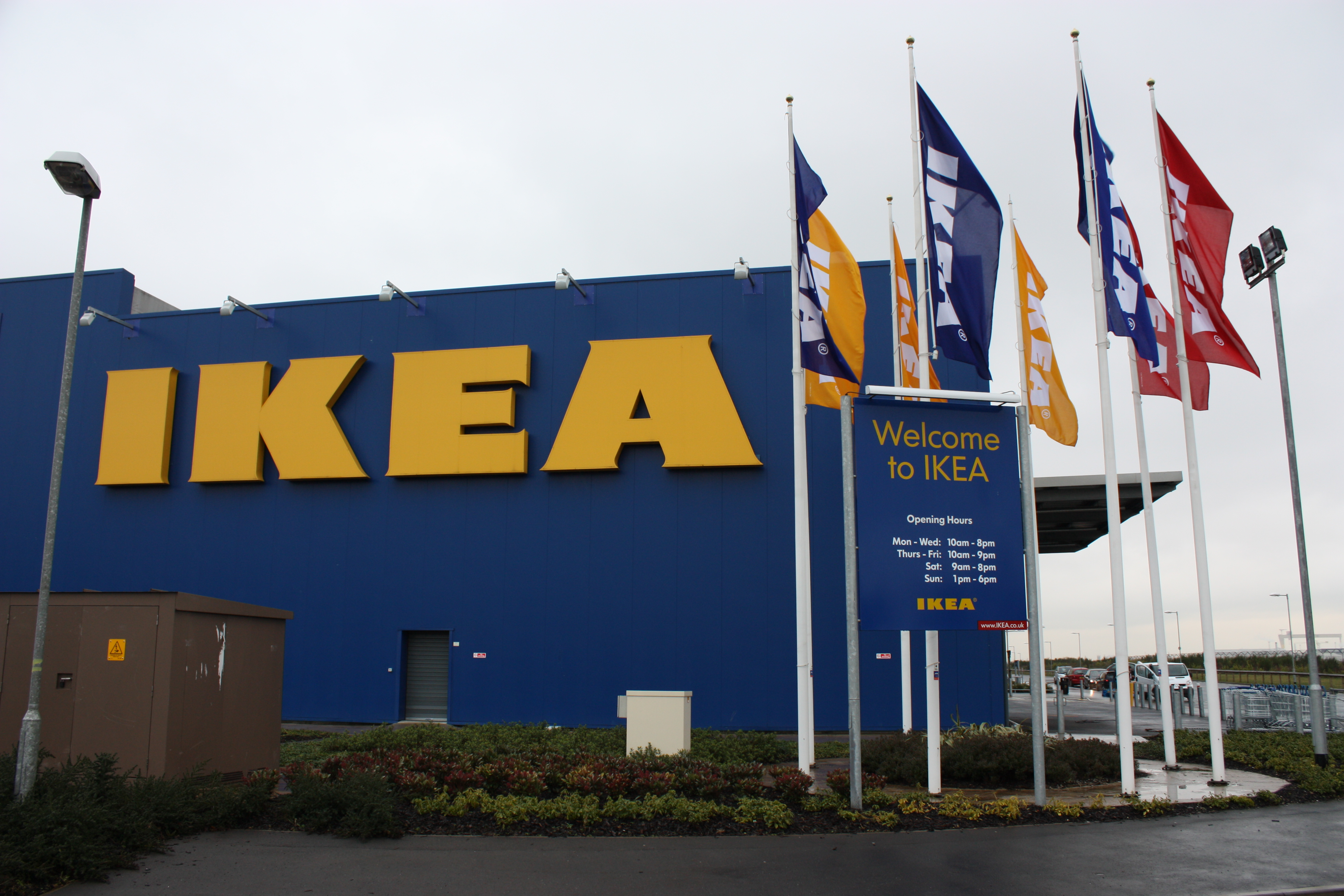
IKEA, Holywood Exchange, 2010

Holywood Exchange is a major retail development on the borders of Belfast and Holywood, Northern Ireland. It is beside Belfast City Airport, in the townland of Knocknagoney. The site was previously known as D5 and Harbour Exchange. At present, the development comprises an eleven-unit, 13,940 m^{2} (150,000 ft^{2}) retail warehouse centre with (as of September 2025); Harvey Norman, Lidl, Next Home, EZ Living Interiors, Home Bargains and Decathlon.

Located beside the retail warehouse is a Sainsbury's superstore and service station, a B&Q Warehouse, and an IKEA store. Like the expansion of the Sprucefield Development, Holywood Exchange has been controversial and the subject of repeated planning problems and legal disputes.

== History ==
The first planning application for what was then known as D5 was made by Aquis Estates Limited, Anglia and General Developments Limited and Belfast Harbour Commissioners on 14 November 1995. A five-week public inquiry was held in December 1996 and January 1997. In 1997, the Planning Appeal Commission and the Department of the Environment's Planning Service recommended that approval should be granted.

Formal planning permission was granted on 13 April 1999. On 21 June that year, Belfast City Council and the Belfast Chamber of Trade and Commerce applied for judicial review of the decision to grant planning permission. On 9 July 1999, planning permission for D5 was quashed as it was judged that the Minister did not take the decision with all the relevant information.

Planning permission for the competing Tesco development on the opposite side of the A2 had been granted on 28 November 1998. Following the quashing of planning permission for D5, its developers sought judicial review of the permission granted to Tesco arguing that the same could apply to that development, however, this was refused on 17 September 1999. This was on the basis that the £13 million Tesco store was almost complete.

The developers then resubmitted their planning application and were granted permission on 21 March 2000. This decision was again successfully challenged in September 2000. Following another appeal, planning permission was granted in February 2001.

The Belfast Chamber of Trade lodged a legal challenge with the House of Lords but the judicial committee of the House refused to grant the chamber of trade leave to appeal. Construction of the B&Q Warehouse commenced in December 2002. B&Q Holywood Exchange opened in August 2003. Sainsbury's Holywood Exchange opened in September 2003 with a sales area of 3,809 m^{2} (41,000 ft^{2})

The retail warehouse units were not let after completion; they are "the subject of strict guidelines that dictate that only bulky goods can be sold" as a result of the legal challenges to its construction. In May 2008, however, The Irish News reported that The Planning Service "is considering an application that would see the addition of a mezzanine floor in the retail warehouse." The paper named Harvey Norman, Next, TK Maxx and British Home Stores as likely tenants, all of which sell electric and/or homeware goods.

=== IKEA ===
In January 2006, IKEA announced its intention to build a 25,800 m^{2} (278,000 ft^{2}) store, its first in Northern Ireland. In May of that year, the company amended its application for a larger 29,000 m^{2} (312,000 ft^{2}) store. The application was approved in December 2006, work on the store began in January 2007, and the store opened on 13 December 2007. The store includes a 500-seat restaurant, bistro and Swedish Shop, and has parking for 1,455 vehicles. Heating is provided by a 1.2 MW biomass boiler fuelled by locally produced woodchips.

=== Restaurant units ===
By 2012, four restaurant units of 924.11 m^{2} (9934 ft^{2}) had been completed within the existing retail units car park. As of September 2025, Burger King, Costa Coffee and Subway are occupying three separate premises. There is also a Starbucks located in the Sainsbury's supermarket.

== Transport ==
The developers of the Holywood Exchange were able to take advantage of existing road connections, the most important element of which was a flyover on the A2, already built for access to the Belfast Harbour Estate. The Belfast–Bangor railway line runs between the site and the A2.

There were proposals for a railway halt to serve both Holywood Exchange and the adjacent Belfast City Airport. However, the airport operators argued that constructing the halt adjacent to the airport terminal (further away from Holywood Exchange) would encourage more air travellers to use the rail connection. The airport operators also stated that they would consider providing road access to the airport through Holywood Exchange as a way of reducing congestion on the existing airport access route.

On 16 January 2007, the Regional Development Minister David Cairns announced that a feasibility study would be launched into the construction of a rapid transit route linking Holywood Exchange to Belfast City Centre. The route would also serve the airport and the Titanic Quarter Development.
