= Holywood railway station (Northern Ireland) =

Railway station in Northern Ireland

Holywood
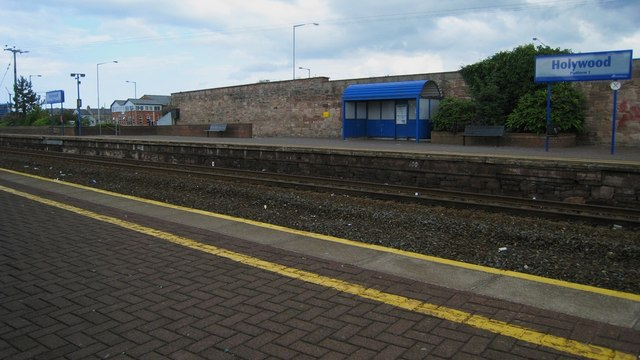

General information
- Location: Holywood; Northern Ireland
- Coordinates: 54.6411°N 5.8395°W
- Owner: NI Railways
- Operator: NI Railways
- Line: Bangor
- Platforms: 2
- Tracks: 2

Construction
- Structure type: At-grade

Other information
- Station code: HW

Key dates
- 2 August 1848: Opened
- May 1865: Line extended to Bangor
- 1897–1902: Bangor line doubled
- 1950: Goods services withdrawn
- 2008: Refurbished

Passengers
- 2022/23: 435,222
- 2023/24: ▲540,233
- 2024/25: ▲544,998
- 2025/26: ▲596,289
- NI Railways; Translink; NI railway stations
Route map
(Click to expand)
Location
- Location within Northern Ireland Location within island of Ireland

Holywood railway station serves Holywood in County Down, Northern Ireland. It is located along the shore of Belfast Lough and during the Summer months, provides excellent views over the lough to Carrickfergus.

== History ==
The Belfast and County Down Railway (B&CDR) opened the line between Queen's Quay, Belfast and Holywood on 2 August 1848. Holywood was a terminus until May 1865, when the Belfast, Holywood and Bangor Railway (BH&BR) opened from Holywood to Bangor. In 1859 the B&CDR sold its Holywood branch to the BH&BR, with the result that Holywood station came under BH&BR management. However, the B&CDR leased the BH&BR line from 1878 and took it over in 1884, which meant that Holywood station returned to its original management and ownership.

When BH&BR opened in 1865 it was single track. In response to increased traffic the B&CDR doubled the track in stages between 1897 and 1902. In 1911 Holywood station handled passenger and parcel traffic, while its goods yard offered facilities for goods, general livestock, horses and prize cattle. Carriages could be conveyed by passenger train.

The Ulster Transport Authority withdrew Holywood's goods services on 24/04/1950. Translink had the station refurbished in 2008.

== Service ==
From Mondays to Saturdays there is a half hourly service westwards to Belfast Grand Central in one direction, and eastwards to Bangor West and Bangor in the other. More frequent trains run at peak times, and the service reduces to hourly in the evenings.

On Sundays there is an hourly service in each direction.

Preceding station	NI Railways	Following station
Sydenham	Northern Ireland Railways; Belfast-Bangor railway line	Marino
	Proposed	
Tillysburn	Northern Ireland Railways; Belfast — Bangor line	Marino

== Sources ==
- Patterson, E.M. (1982) [1958]. Belfast and County Down Railway. Newton Abbott: David & Charles. ISBN 071538306X.
