= Bangor West railway station =

Station in County Down, Northern Ireland

Bangor West
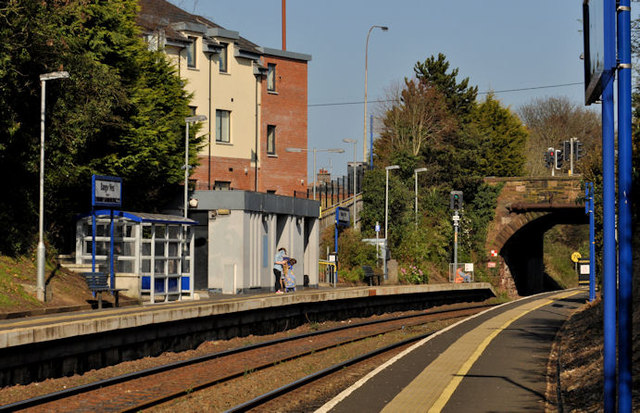
- Bangor West station in 2012

General information
- Location: Crawfordsburn Road, Bangor; County Down; Northern Ireland, United Kingdom
- Coordinates: 54.6595°N 5.6929°W
- Owner: NI Railways
- Operator: NI Railways
- Line: Bangor
- Platforms: 2
- Tracks: 2

Construction
- Structure type: At-grade

Other information
- Station code: BW

History
- Opened: 1 June 1928
- Original company: Belfast and County Down Railway

Key dates
- 1928: Opened
- 2008: Refurbished

Passengers
- 2022/23: 198,490
- 2023/24: ▲263,853
- 2024/25: ▲281,836
- 2025/26: ▲316,524
- NI Railways; Translink; NI railway stations
Route map
(Click to expand)
Location
- Location within Northern Ireland Location within island of Ireland

Bangor West railway station is located in the townland of Ballyvarnet in Bangor, County Down, Northern Ireland.

== History ==
It was opened on 1 June 1928 by the Belfast and County Down Railway to serve the rapidly expanding suburbs of Bangor. It was initially provided with a wooden structure on the up side to function as waiting room and ticket office.

It was replaced with a simple, more robust concrete structure in 1978. It remains one of the few intermediate suburban stations in Northern Ireland to retain a ticket office. This is owed to the station's high popularity and usage, being served by the Bangor express train, one of the few stations in North Down to be served.

== Service ==
Mondays to Saturdays there is a half-hourly service towards Belfast Grand Central in the westbound direction, and to Bangor in the other eastbound direction. Extra services operate at peak times, and the service reduces to hourly in the evenings.

Certain peak-time express trains operate non-stop from here to Holywood and Belfast Grand Central.

On Sundays there is an hourly service in each direction.

Preceding station	NI Railways	Following station
Carnalea	Northern Ireland Railways; Belfast-Bangor Line	Bangor
