= Victoria Park, Belfast =

Park in Belfast, Northern Ireland

Coordinates: 54.6073°N 5.8886°W

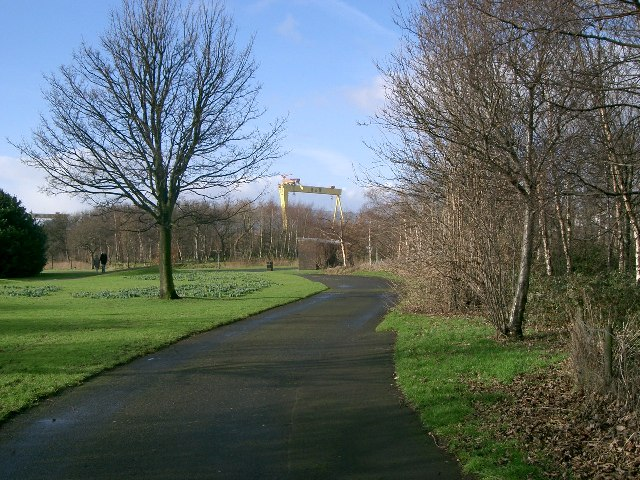
Victoria Park

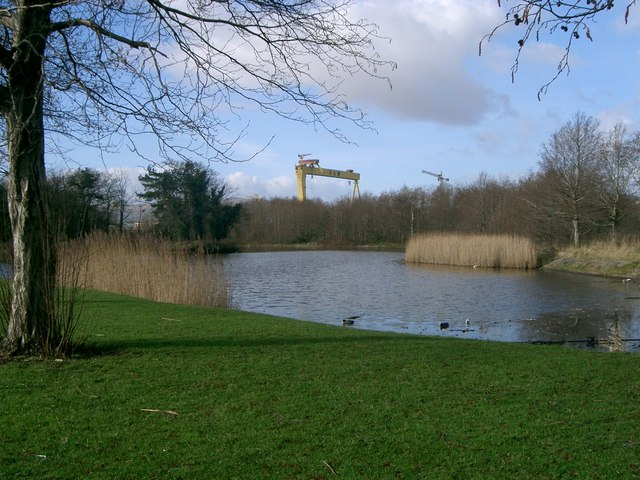
Victoria Park lake in Winter

Victoria Park was opened in 1906 in the Connswater area of Belfast. Belfast Harbour Commissioners investigated the idea in 1854, however the land was very marshy and needed draining near Belfast Lough. It was landscaped by Charles McKimm, who also built the Tropical Ravine in Botanic Gardens. Victoria Park contains a large lake.

== Stations ==
Victoria Park had a namesake station called Victoria Park which was opened in 1905 by the Belfast and County Down Railway and closed in 1988. Today the Victoria Park can be accessed from Sydenham.

== Belfast Victoria Parkrun ==
Belfast Victoria Park holds a weekly 5K run which is run by Parkrun.
