= Ballymacarrett =

Townland/electoral ward in Belfast, Northern Ireland

Coordinates: 54°36′05″N 5°54′21″W

Ballymacarrett or Ballymacarret (from Irish Baile Mhic Gearóid 'MacGearóid's settlement') is the name of both a townland and electoral ward in Belfast, Northern Ireland. The townland is in the civil parish of Knockbreda in the historic barony of Castlereagh Upper in County Down, and has existed since earlier than 1622.

The electoral ward is part of the Titanic district electoral area of Belfast City Council. The ward was created in 1973, with most of the population coming from the former Pottinger ward. It was slightly enlarged in 1985, taking in part of the Island ward.

The ward consists of two distinct districts: Ballymacarrett, which is almost entirely Protestant, and the Short Strand which is almost entirely Catholic, with the two separated by a peaceline. Consequently, in the 2001 census, the Roman Catholic community background figure was 51%.

Set in the shadows of the Harland and Wolff cranes Samson & Goliath, large numbers of local men worked in the shipyard during its heyday. The area is also well known for 'Ulster's Freedom Corner', a series of loyalist murals.

== History ==
Ballymacarrett has not always been part of Belfast. Even after its industry, infrastructure and population had become intertwined with the city, its official incorporation happened slowly in several stages, with Belfast often reluctant to take on the burden of the townland's population. It was incorporated into the municipal boundary of Belfast in 1852.

=== Population history ===
Year	Population	Source
1782	419	
1791	1,208	
1816	2,000	
1824	4,363	
1837	5,168	
1841	6,697	

=== 17th and 18th centuries ===
In 1622, James Hamilton (Viscount of Clandeboye) leased the townland of Ballymacarret to Richard and Henry Whitehead. Later leases were made to the merchant family Kelso from Ayr, Scotland. In 1672, ‘Balle maccarrett alias Ballincrat’ was sold to Thomas Pottinger, whose merchant family built the large Mountpottinger house in the townland.

In 1744, the only two buildings described in Ballymacarrett were Mountpottinger and a mill. Handloom weavers had built small cottages, forming a village at Ballymacarrett. In 1776, glass works were opened on land reclaimed from the Lagan, and a pottery factory soon followed. In 1799 the first vitriol works was established. By 1791, the village had 257 houses and a population of 1,208.

=== 19th century ===
From around 1825, Ballymacarrett transformed rapidly from a rural village into a town. In 1836, 223 people in Ballymacarrett worked as labourers, earning an estimated yearly wage of £15 to £18 (£1500 to £1800 in 2025). By 1837, the townland had 5168 inhabitants and a police station. Industry in 1837 included:

- Calico and muslin manufacture, employing several hundred people
- The Lagan foundry, which employed 140 people
- A rope yard and sail cloth factory, which employed 130 people
- Two large linen spinning mills (opened in 1834), which employed more than 300 people
- Two vitriol works, which supplied local bleachers, dyers, and calico printers
- Various starch, meal and flour factories incorporating steam and water mills

Belfast Poor Law Union was formed on 1 June 1839 and assigned two out of 22 members of its Board of Guardians to Ballymacarrett. Ballymacarrett was greatly impacted by the famine, but had difficulties obtaining government assistance because it was officially treated as separate from Belfast. In 1840, the reforms of the Municipal Corporations Act added Ballymacarrett to the corporation of the town of Belfast.

Ballymacarrett was incorporated into the municipal boundaries of Belfast in 1852. In 1853, the landowner of the townland, Baron Templemore planned a sweeping redevelopment of the area, which would have replaced it with a planned suburb. Templemore Avenue was built under this plan before the scheme was abandoned due to cost.

=== 20th century ===
==== The Troubles ====
In some ways the ward has been a microcosm of the Northern Ireland troubles. The June 1970 "Battle of Saint Matthew's" occupies an important place in Irish republican history after a gun battle between republicans and loyalists, who were accused of attacking the church. Loyalists counter this with claims that three Orange Order members were killed after returning from a parade. The Historical Enquiries Team (HET) confirmed the loyalist version of events. It is seen as one of the key developments in the rise to prominence of the Provisional IRA. Similarly on the Ballymacarrett side of the peaceline, Protestant residents have claimed that Republicans are engaged in attacks on Protestant homes which amount to 'ethnic cleansing' – claims which Republicans dispute and deny.

==== 2011 East Belfast riots ====
Ballymacarrett and the nearby Newtownards Road played a key part in what became known as the 2011 Northern Ireland riots. At first, the riots were only located in the area and were known as the 2011 East Belfast riots but by July, the riots had spread to other parts of the country. During the riots, the Protestants in the area were going against Short Strand Catholics.

== Transport ==
Ballymacarrett was the location of the Ballymacarrett Junction, a large railway junction that served the Belfast and County Down Railway from its Queens Quay terminus, to Bangor in the north, and the mainline running south to Comber, Downpatrick and Newcastle. There was also an interconnection over the river Lagan to the Great Northern Railway and on to Belfast Central railway station.

Ballymacarrett is also served by Belfast Metro bus routes 3a,f,g as well as Connswater 'EzyBus' route EB2.

Ballymacarrett was the scene of the Ballymacarrett rail crash which occurred at 7.50am on 10 January 1945 when the 7.40am rail motor Holywood to Belfast crashed into the rear of the 7.10am Bangor to Belfast train. 22 passengers were killed, and 27 injured. The darkness and local fog were a factor but the driver of the rail motor was held to blame.

Ballymacarrett Halt railway station was located on the B&CDR route from Belfast to Bangor. It opened on 1 May 1905, but closed on 9 May 1977, when the adjacent Bridge End railway station opened.
