= Queen's Quay railway station =

Railway station in Belfast, Northern Ireland

Queen's Quay
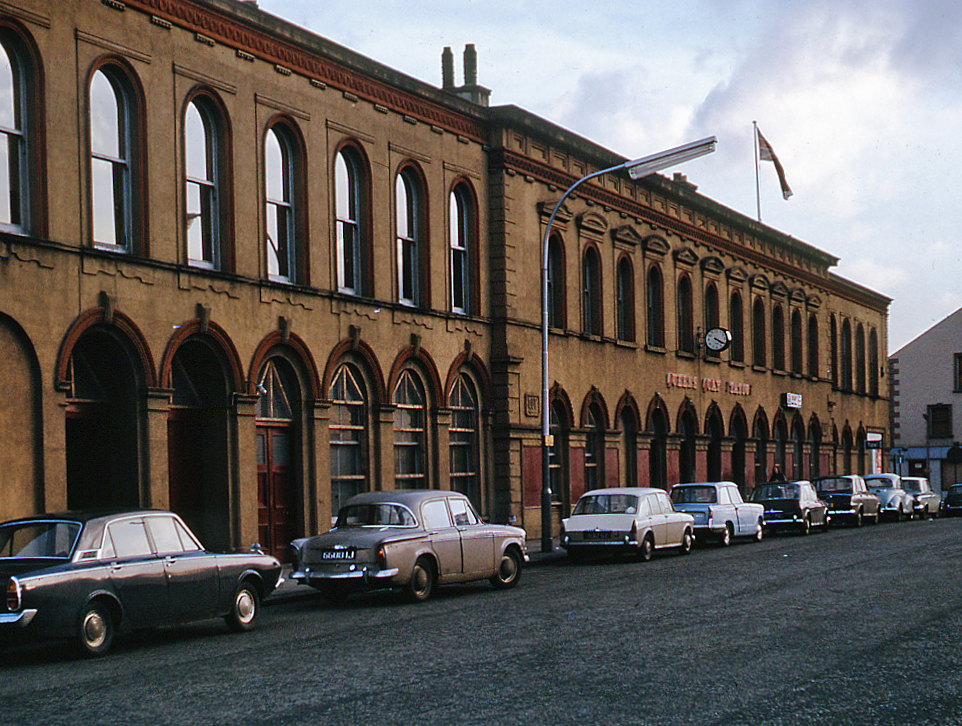
- Queen's Quay station in 1971

General information
- Location: Belfast, Belfast City; Northern Ireland
- Coordinates: 54.6016°N 5.9174°W
- Platforms: 3 at closure (originally 5)

Other information
- Status: Disused

History
- Post-grouping: Northern Ireland Railways

Key dates
- 1848: Station opened by the Belfast, Holywood and Bangor Railway, as Belfast
- 1850: Adjacent station opened by the B&CD
- 1852: Renamed Belfast, Queen's Quay
- 1884: Stations merged
- 1910-14: Station rebuilt
- 1976: Station closed
Location

Queen's Quay railway station (also referred to as Belfast Queen's Quay) served the east of Belfast in Northern Ireland. It was formerly one of the three terminus railway stations in Belfast. The others were Great Victoria Street, and York Road.

== History ==
=== Belfast and County Down Railway ===
Queen's Quay station was opened in 1848 as Belfast and was the terminus of the Belfast, Hollywood & Bangor Railway. The Belfast and County Down Railway opened an adjacent station two years later, both stations merging after a further two years. At its height, it contained five platforms and operated services to Ardglass, Bangor, Comber, Donaghadee, Downpatrick and Newcastle.

=== Ulster Transport Authority / Northern Ireland Railways ===
The station and its lines were taken over by the Ulster Transport Authority in 1948, who then set about closing large portions of the County Down network. The lines from Queen's Quay to Ardglass, Comber and Newcastle were withdrawn in January 1950. The line to Donaghadee was then removed in April 1950. This left Queen's Quay for the remainder of its years as a fairly quiet terminus for the suburban services to and from Bangor. The interior of the station suffered extensive damage from bomb attacks as The Troubles took hold in Northern Ireland, leaving it a mostly-empty shell by the 1970s, when Northern Ireland Railways took over the country's rail network.

A connection was provided at Ballymacarrett Junction to the Belfast Central Railway, which linked to the Great Northern Railway of Ireland at Great Victoria Street along a track through the site where Belfast Central station now stands. This was primarily used only for rolling stock transfers and freight workings, and closed in 1965. The connection and railway line was subsequently rebuilt in 1976 to allow Bangor line services to transfer to Belfast Central and run directly through to the rest of the Northern Ireland railway network.

=== Following closure ===
Queen's Quay station was closed on 10 April 1976. The rebuilt chord to Belfast Central was brought into operation the next day, and Bangor Line services began to operate into the city centre and through to the Newry Line. The station's train servicing facilities were then converted for use as Northern Ireland Railways' Central Services Depot, primarily for stock stabling and maintenance. This depot closed in 1994 to make way for the Cross-Harbour Rail Link including the Dargan Bridge, linking the Larne Line to Belfast Central, and the M3 flyover.

Today, nothing of the station or the service depot remains. The site itself is mostly buried under the embankment for the M3 flyover, with only a small section of ground used as a tram stop for the station remaining open, now in use as a car park beside the motorway.

However, the station clock which can be seen in the photograph below titled "Station interior in 1974" was salvaged when the station closed in 1976, and it still exists today.

== Service ==
At its peak, services ran to Comber (where passengers would change for trains to Ardglass, Downpatrick and Newcastle), Donaghadee, and Bangor. Following takeover and subsequent rationalisation by the UTA, this left only the services to Bangor operating into the NIR era, until the station was closed in 1976.

Preceding station	Disused railways	Following station
Terminus	Northern Ireland Railways; Belfast-Bangor	Ballymacarrett
Terminus	Belfast and County Down Railway; Belfast-Ardglass/Newcastle (until 1950)	Fraser Street
Terminus	Belfast and County Down Railway; Belfast-Donaghadee (until 1950)	Fraser Street

== Gallery ==
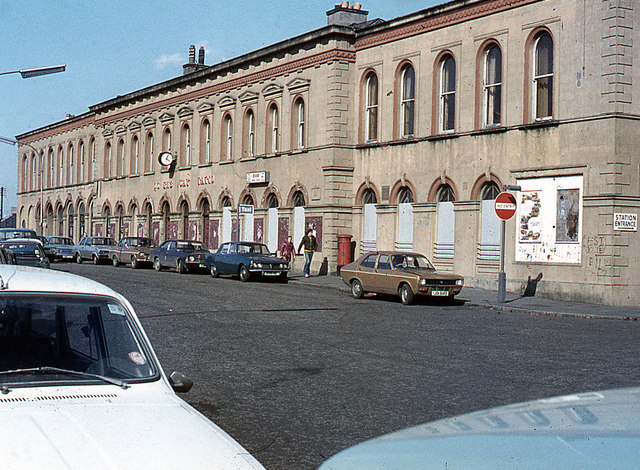
Queen's Quay station in 1974

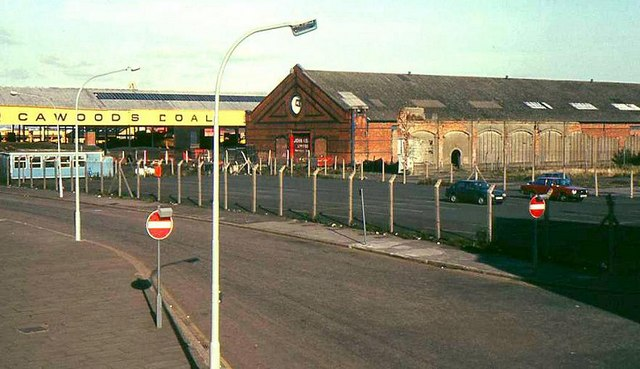
Site of Queen's Quay station in 1988

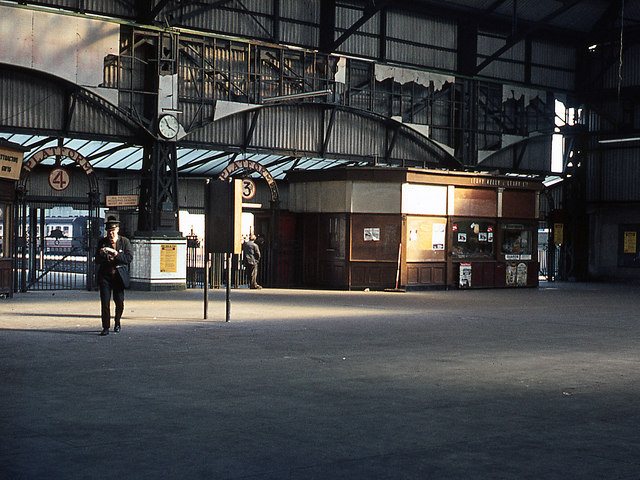
Station interior in 1974

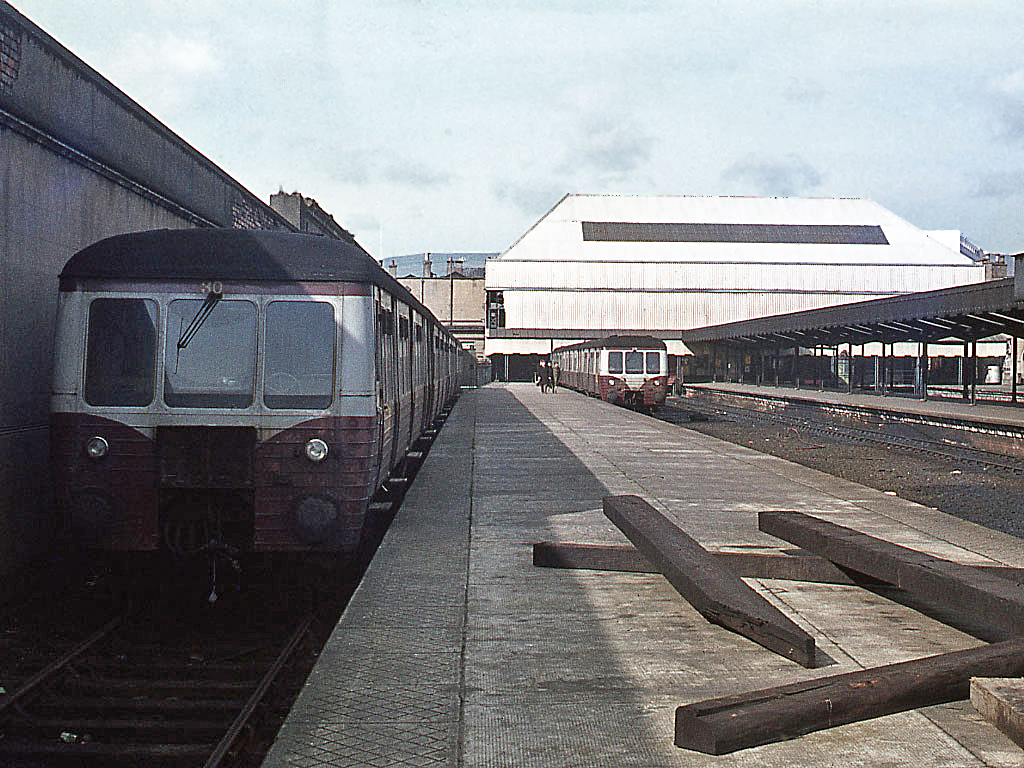
Platform 1 on the final day of service

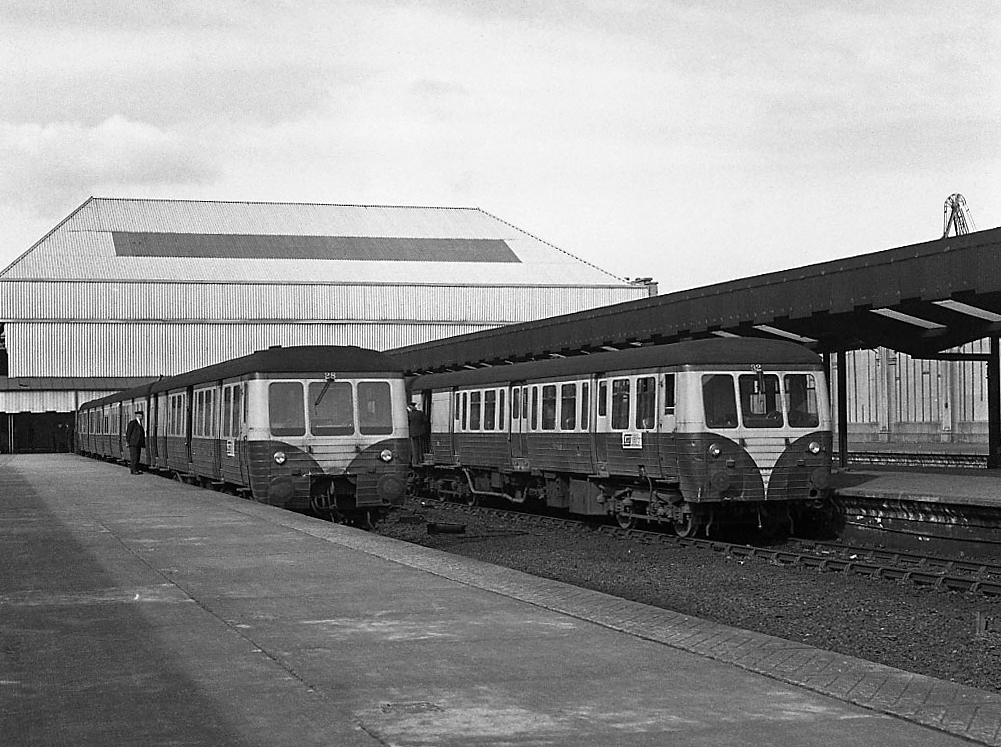
Platforms 2 and 3 on the final day of service

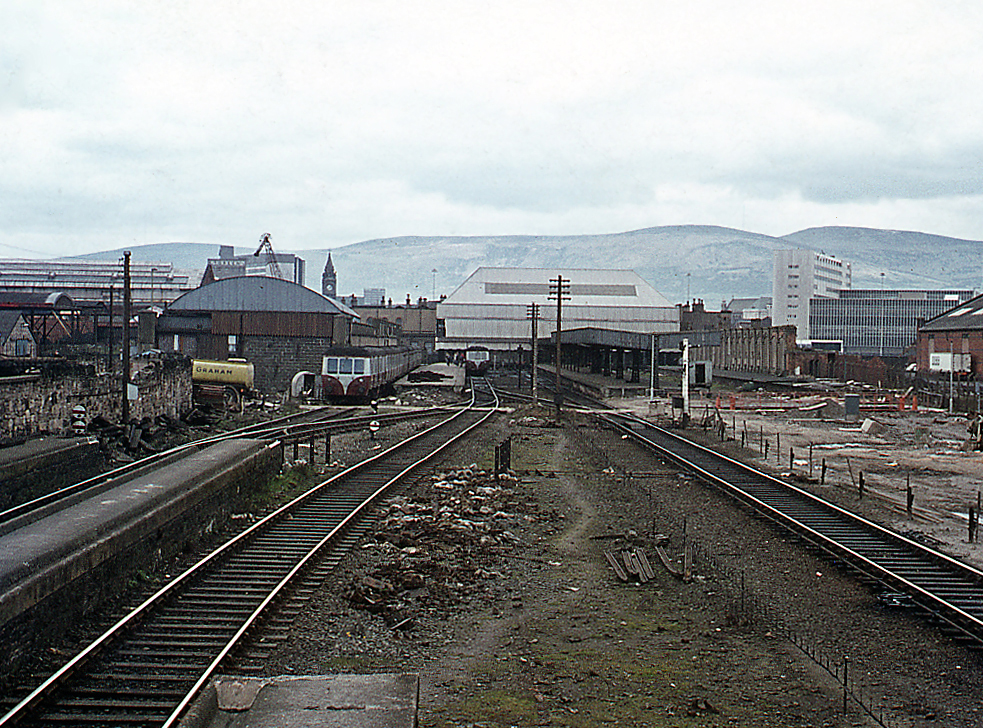
General view of the station on the final day of service

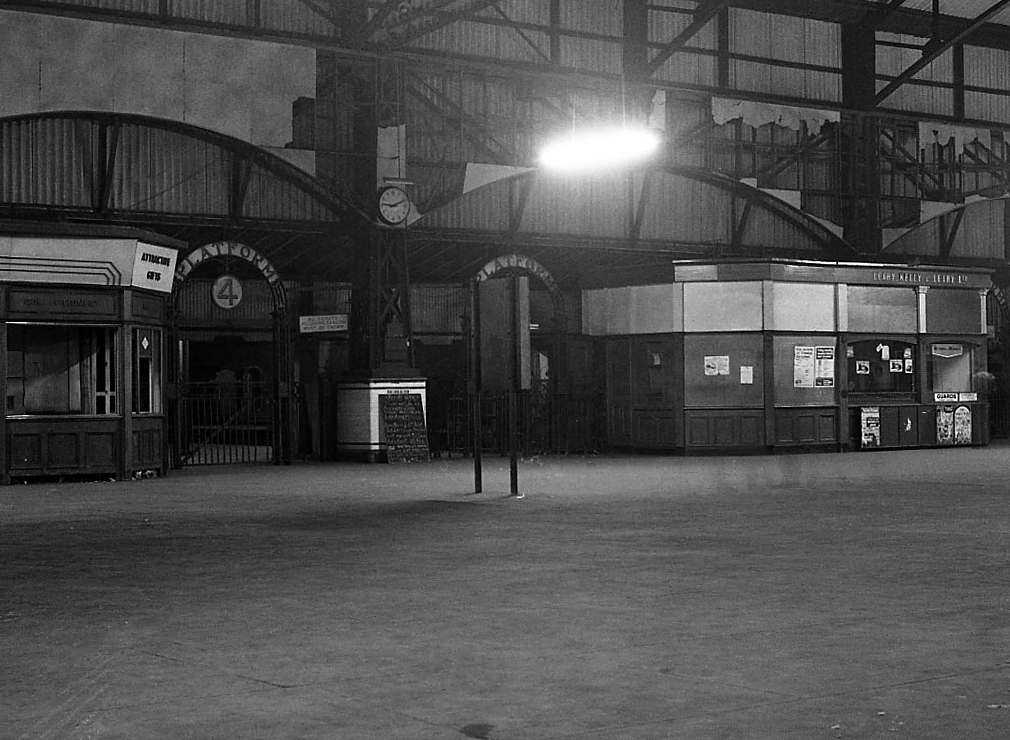
Station interior on the last day of operation

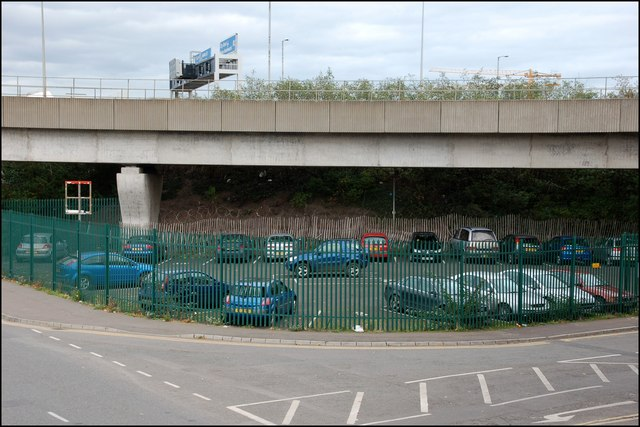
Site of Queen's Quay station in 2007
