= The Arc apartments =

Residential development in Northern Ireland

Coordinates: 54.60523°N 5.91164°W

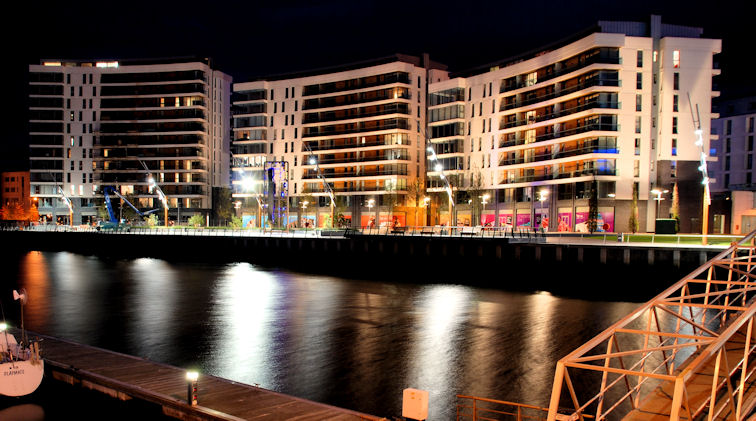
The Arc at night in 2010

The Arc is a residential development located beside Abercorn Basin in the Titanic Quarter of Belfast, Northern Ireland. It contains 474 residential properties, a hotel, and a number of retail units, split across three buildings. The name "Arc" is an abbreviation for Abercorn Residential Complex, and also refers to the curved design of the buildings.

== History ==
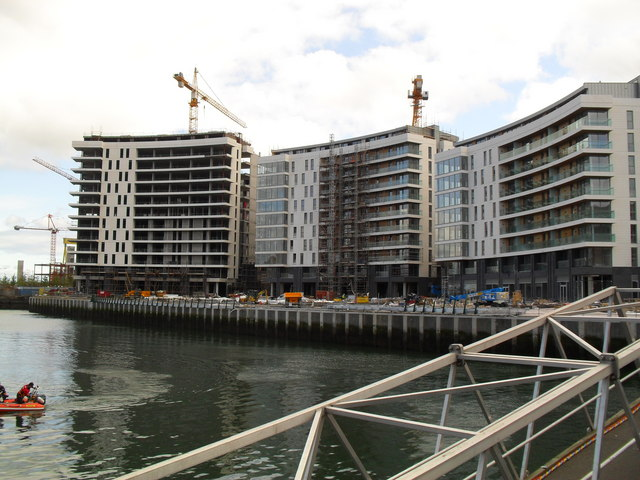
The Arc during construction

Initial plans for the Arc were unveiled in 2003, with the residential complex to be located in the Abercorn Basin area of the Titanic Quarter in Belfast. The promotional material was criticised as reaching "new heights of cultural cringe, at least for Belfast, wrapped around the language of urban renaissance".

The developer was Titanic Quarter Ltd (TQL). The architect was John Reid of RMI Architects. The contractor was Harcourt Construction. Planning consultancy was by Turley. The cost was £70 million.

The Arc was built between 2007 and 2012. Residents moved into the first blocks in September 2009. 80% of the apartments were purchased off-plan before they were ready for occupation. The 2008 financial crisis caused a collapse in property values in Northern Ireland and some early buyers of Arc properties were unable to complete their purchases. TQL began legal proceedings to force some purchasers to meet their obligations. With sales slow after the crisis, TQL put some of the remaining apartments on the rental market. Combining collapsed sales and unsold properties now on the lettings market, TQL remains by far the largest single apartment leaseholder.

A notable penthouse resident was Emilia Clarke, who lived in the Arc while filming scenes as Daenerys Targaryen in Game of Thrones.

== Apartment complex ==
The Arc contains 474 residential properties. They consist of: two-bedroom, one-bedroom and three-bedroom apartments; penthouses; and maisonettes (duplexes) facing Queens Road. In all, there are 26 different designs of dwelling. For example, a C-type is a one-bedroom apartment.

There are three buildings. The oldest, Building A, is closest to the city centre and has eight levels. Building B in the middle has ten levels. Building C, completed last, is the tallest with twelve levels. The three buildings are separated by two short cobbled alleys, which give access to Queens Road and are known as streetscapes. Each building is divided into four cores, except for Building A which has three cores and a branch of the Premier Inn budget hotel chain. The cores are therefore Core 2 to Core 12. Each core has one entrance hall, one set of stairs, one lift, one foot exit to a streetscape and several foot exits to the secured utility and parking areas within the building. Access control is through fobs issued to residents. There is one type of fob (coded for a single core) for foot access and another to pass through any of the four vehicle gates. Each of the eleven cores has direct access by foot to the public street, because the Arc has no single central entrance. There is no concierge service. The Arc has no other communal services, such as a health club or laundry room. On-site security is supplemented by CCTV recording inside and outside the buildings. In late 2024, ANPR cameras were installed in the streetscapes to try to mitigate problems of illegal parking and congestion.

Each building has an elevated podium garden for the private use of residents. Access is from the 1st or 2nd floors, depending on the core.

Allocated covered parking for residents is provided in basement garages which are at four levels. The Level -2 parking garage stretches the full length of the complex, providing underground connectivity among all the cores. There is a small number of parking spaces available to visitors for a daily fee. There is no free visitor car parking anywhere in the area. Basic facilities are provided in the Arc parking garage for bicycles and motorcycles. November 2022 saw the start of an electric vehicle (EV) charging pilot, operated by Weev. However, there are no plans at present to provide EV charging at all Arc parking spaces.

The retail tenants are currently Dock cafe, Greggs, Paper Cup cafe, SPAR grocery store and off-licence, Subway and U:Move E-Bikes. The SPAR grocery store includes a sub post office. The rest of the available retail units are not in use at present. The retail units range in size from 750 to 7,000 sq ft.

The property manager is TQ (ARC) Building Management Limited.The Arc is unusual in that entities from the same business group have the roles of freeholder, property manager and single largest leaseholder.

Due to its size, the Arc has several postcodes in the BT3 postal area of Belfast and several different street numbers on Queens Road. Deliveries and post for residents should be addressed to X.YY The Arc, where X is the core and YY is the apartment number within the core. A fictitious example of a full address is: 8.88 The Arc, 2G Queens Road, Belfast BT3 9FG. In January 2023, automated Amazon lockers for secure parcel delivery were installed in each of the three Level 0 utility areas.

== Public realm ==
The open ground in the immediate vicinity is known as the Arc Public Realm. Most of this is a plaza between the concave frontage of the apartment buildings and the Abercorn Basin, which opens to the River Lagan and hosts Belfast Harbour Marina. The plaza is designed in Titanic Quarter style and is artistically enhanced with sculptures and street furniture. Next to the oldest residential building, the Belfast Buoys are installed.

== Media appearances ==
The Arc has featured in popular television shows. For example, Marcella Series 3 has a scene in which the title character parks in the Arc basement car park and walks away. For another scene, a "body" was filmed falling from an Arc apartment balcony, apparently confusing some viewers. Other media properties which feature scenes shot in the Arc or the Public Realm include Halo: Nightfall, Line of Duty and The Fall.

== External wall safety review and Arc remediation project ==
After the Grenfell Tower fire of 2017 which led to the United Kingdom cladding crisis, the Arc underwent an external wall safety review. The inspection revealed fire hazards requiring remedial works with estimated costs of several thousand pounds per two-bedroom property. In July 2023, it was announced that Northern Ireland buildings of the Arc's type could benefit from full UK government funding for cladding remediation. In September 2023, an application for planning permission for a remediation project was filed. The project involves replacing the timber and zinc materials in the external walls, balconies and podium gardens. In late 2024 the funding for the project was finally approved. The Arc remediation project began on March 27th, 2025 and is expected to run for 18 months.
