= Sydenham railway station (Northern Ireland) =

Railway station in Northern Ireland

Sydenham
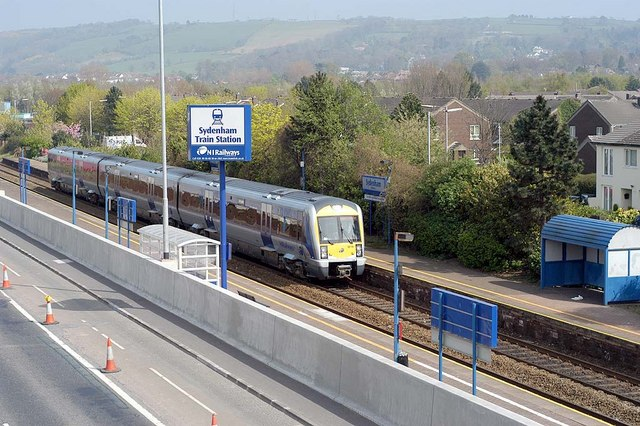
- Sydenham railway station in 2007

General information
- Location: Belfast; Northern Ireland
- Coordinates: 54.6093°N 5.8773°W
- Owner: NI Railways
- Operator: NI Railways
- Line: Bangor
- Platforms: 2
- Tracks: 2

Construction
- Structure type: At-grade

Other information
- Station code: SY

Key dates
- 1851: Opened
- 2008: Refurbished

Passengers
- 2022/23: 222,023
- 2023/24: ▲271,496
- 2024/25: ▼250,659
- 2025/26: ▲288,796
- NI Railways; Translink; NI railway stations
Route map
(Click to expand)
Location
- Location within Northern Ireland Location within island of Ireland

Sydenham railway station is located in the townland of Ballymisert in east Belfast, and is within walking distance of Belfast City Airport and Victoria Park. The station is unstaffed, and was opened on 1 November 1851. The station was originally named Ballymisert before being renamed Sydenham on 1 November 1856.

== Service ==
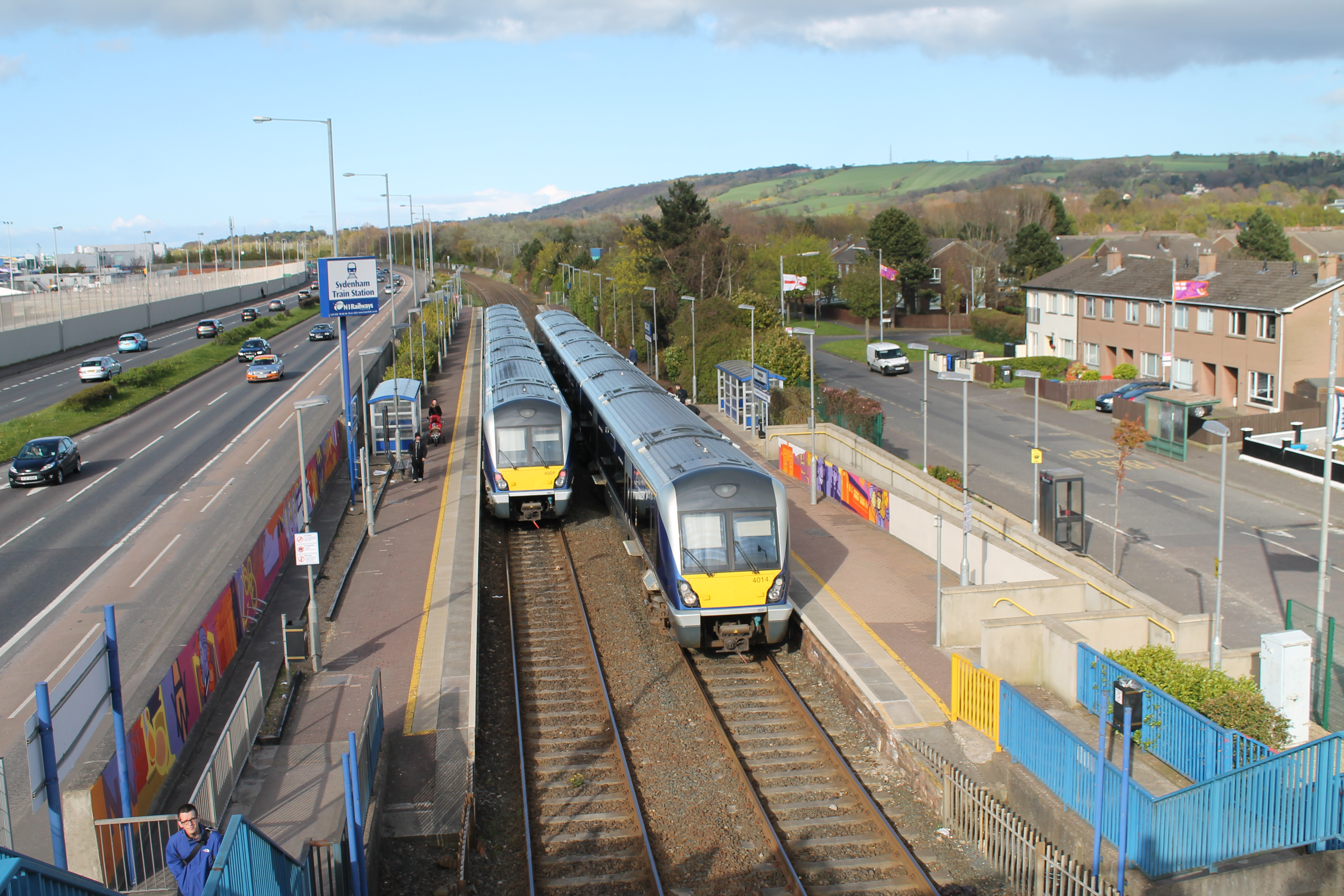

Mondays to Saturdays there is a half-hourly westbound service towards Belfast Grand Central in one direction, and a half-hourly eastbound service towards Holywood and Bangor in the other, with extra services at peak times.

In the evenings, the service reduces to hourly operation. Some peak-time express trains will pass through this station without stopping.

On Sundays there is an hourly service in each direction.

Preceding station	NI Railways	Following station
Titanic Quarter	Northern Ireland Railways; Belfast-Bangor	Holywood
	Historical railways	
Victoria Park; Line open, station closed	Belfast and County Down Railway; Belfast-Bangor	Holywood; Line and station open
	Proposed	
Titanic Quarter	Northern Ireland Railways; Belfast-Bangor	Tillysburn
