= Titanic Quarter railway station =

Station in Belfast, Northern Ireland

Titanic Quarter
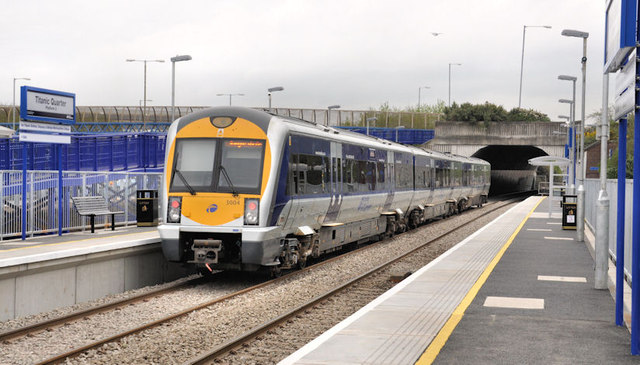

General information
- Other names: Bridge End
- Location: Belfast; Northern Ireland
- Coordinates: 54.6019°N 5.9064°W
- System: Translink rail halt
- Owner: NI Railways
- Operator: NI Railways
- Line: Bangor
- Platforms: 2
- Tracks: 2

Construction
- Structure type: At-grade

Other information
- Station code: TQ

Key dates
- 1977: Opened as Bridge End
- 2008: Refurbished
- 2012: Further refurbishment Renamed to Titanic Quarter

Passengers
- 2022/23: 204,456
- 2023/24: ▲268,030
- 2024/25: ▼230,793
- 2025/26: ▲269,100
- NI Railways; Translink; NI railway stations
Route map
(Click to expand)
Location
- Location within Northern Ireland Location within island of Ireland

Titanic Quarter railway station (formerly Bridge End railway station) is located in the townland of Ballymacarrett in east Belfast, Northern Ireland. It is a short walk from the The O2 Belfast and Titanic Quarter.

== History ==
Bridge End (as it was known when it opened on Monday 9 May 1977) replaced the nearby Ballymacarrett station (opened 1 May 1905 and closed on Monday 9 May 1977). The platforms of this station can still be seen from passing trains, as can the platforms for Victoria Park, another station before Sydenham which closed in the late 1980s.

Bridge End station was officially renamed "Titanic Quarter" on 28th of March 2012 to coincide with the opening of developments in the nearby Titanic Quarter area. In addition, there is planned work which will include improvements to pedestrian and cycle access and new signage from the rail halt into the Quarter.

== Service ==
Mondays to Saturdays, there is a half-hourly service westbound towards Belfast Grand Central and eastbound to Bangor. Extra services operate at peak times, and the service reduces to hourly operation in the evenings.

On Sundays there is an hourly service in each direction.

Preceding station	NI Railways	Following station
Lanyon Place	Northern Ireland Railways; Belfast-Bangor	Sydenham
	Historical railways	
Lanyon Place; Line and station open	Northern Ireland Railways; Belfast-Bangor	Victoria Park; Line open, station closed
