= Belfast–Bangor line =

Commuter railway line in Northern Ireland

Bangor Line
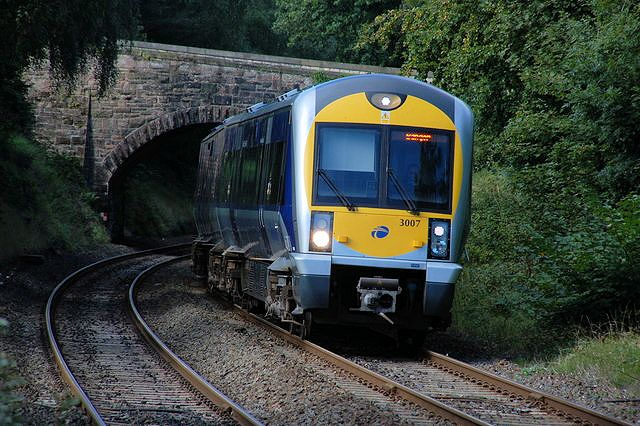
- NI Railways Class 3000 approaching Seahill.

Overview
- Status: Operational
- Locale: Northern Ireland
- Termini: Belfast Grand Central; Bangor
- Stations: 14

Service
- Type: Commuter rail Regional rail Heavy rail
- System: NI Railways
- Services: Belfast-Bangor
- Operator: NI Railways
- Rolling stock: Class 3000 "C3K"; Class 4000 "C4K"

Technical
- Number of tracks: Double track
- Track gauge: 1,600 mm (5 ft 3 in)
- Electrification: Un-electrified
- Operating speed: 70 mph (110 km/h)
Route map
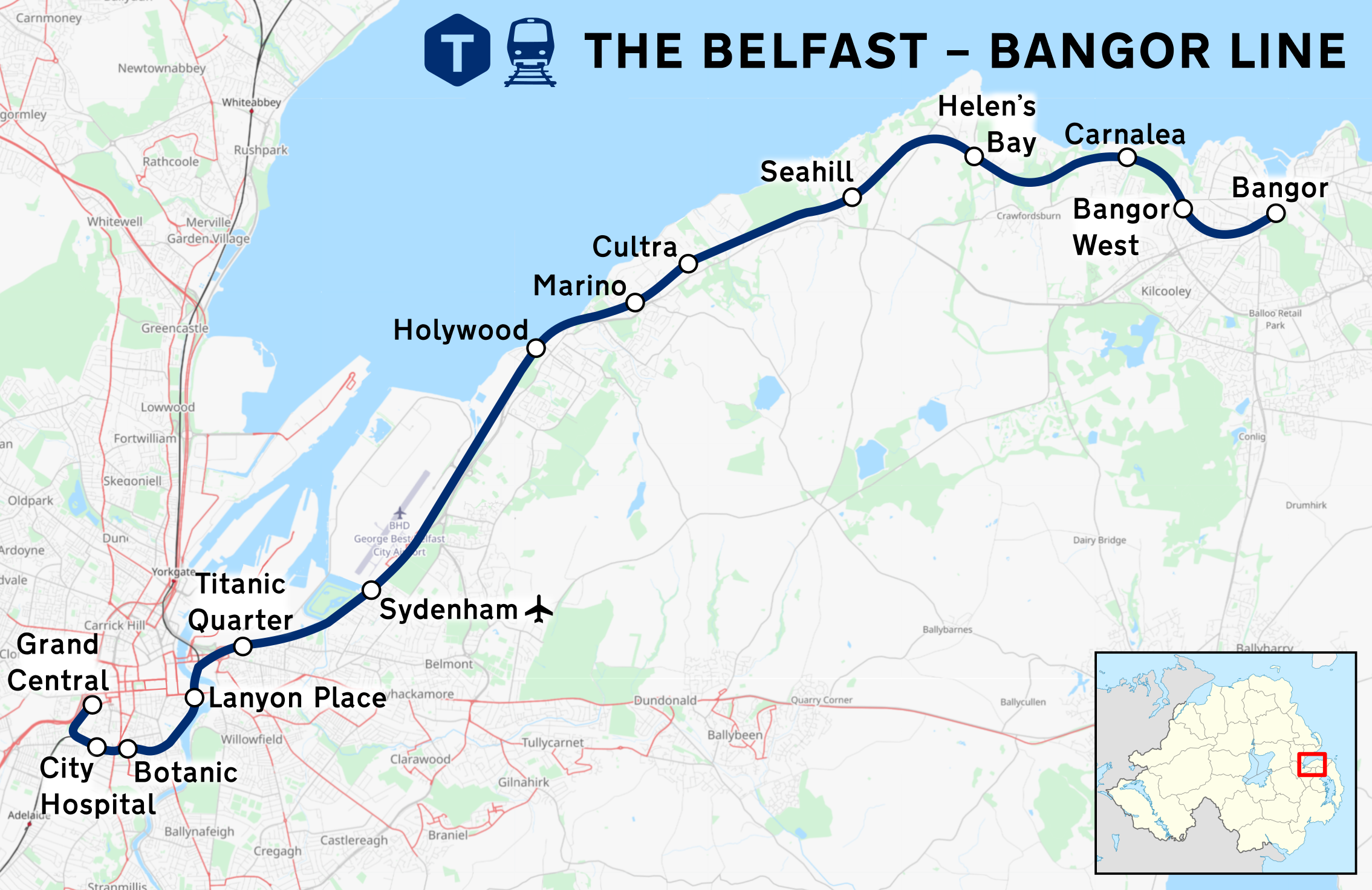
(Click to expand)

The Belfast–Bangor line (known simply as the Bangor Line by NI Railways) is a railway line in Northern Ireland, originally part of the Belfast & County Down Railway. All services are operated by NI Railways, the only operator for Northern Ireland (NI). Unlike the rest of the United Kingdom, no railway in NI is part of the National Rail network and none is owned by Network Rail. Services run every half-hour, with up to six trains per hour in each direction (3 express and 3 stopping services) at peak times.

All NI Railways services on this line terminate at Belfast Grand Central and Bangor Bus and Rail Centre stopping at stations in between.

== History ==
The Bangor Line originated with the incorporation of the Belfast, Holywood, and Bangor Railway (BHBR) on June 26, 1846. The first section of the line, running from Belfast to Holywood, opened on August 2, 1848. The line was extended to Bangor on May 1, 1865, and subsequently acquired by the Belfast and County Down Railway (BCDR) in 1884.

The BCDR's first chief engineer, Sir John Macneill, played a significant role in overcoming engineering challenges, including constructing a line across the marshy River Quoile. Throughout the late 19th and early 20th centuries, the BCDR expanded its network, including lines to Downpatrick, Newcastle, and Ardglass, with several branch lines.

In the early 20th century, the Bangor Line played a significant role in promoting tourism, with Bangor becoming a popular seaside destination. The railway facilitated excursions and day trips, contributing to the town's growth as a resort. By the 1940s, the BCDR operated a fleet of 29 locomotives and 181 carriages, with its workshops located at Queen's Quay in Belfast. However, financial difficulties and declining passenger numbers during and after World War II led to nationalization.

Following the creation of the Ulster Transport Authority (UTA) in 1948, much of the BCDR network was closed, including lines to Newcastle and Donaghadee. The Bangor Line was the only section retained for passenger services, as an important commuter route.

Until 2024, trains on the Bangor Line operated as through services between Bangor and Portadown or Newry via Lanyon Place and Great Victoria Street stations. Following the opening of Belfast Grand Central Station, Bangor Line trains now terminate and start from Belfast Grand Central, with services to Portadown and Newry operating separately from Belfast Grand Central.

== Rail Air Link ==
The Belfast-Bangor Line is part of the key link for visitors into Belfast city centre. Trains run from Belfast Grand Central via Belfast Lanyon Place to Sydenham for planes from George Best Belfast City Airport.

== Key Sites ==
The Bangor Line provides access to several key attractions in Belfast. Passengers can alight at Botanic Station for the Ulster Museum, Queen's University Belfast, and the nearby Botanic Gardens, home to the Palm House and the Tropical Ravine. City Hospital Station offers direct access to Belfast City Hospital. At Cultra, visitors can access the Ulster Folk & Transport Museum, which occasionally uses a private rail siding for museum operations, though it is not open to passenger services. Titanic Quarter Station serves the The O2, Titanic Quarter, and W5 an interactive science and discovery centre.

== Controversies ==
=== Terminating of Direct Rail Services (2024) ===
In October 2024, the opening of Belfast's Grand Central Station led to significant changes in the city's rail services. Notably, the direct train service between Bangor and Portadown, which previously operated through central Belfast, was discontinued. As a result, passengers traveling between these locations now require a transfer at Grand Central Station.

This alteration has been met with mixed reactions from passengers and local politicians. Some commuters have expressed frustration over the need to change trains, citing increased travel times and inconvenience. For instance, hospital workers who previously relied on the direct service to reach City Hospital and Botanic stations have reported challenges, with some opting to drive instead.

Politicians have also voiced concerns. In November 2024, during a session in the Northern Ireland Assembly, Mr. Robbie Butler, a member of the Ulster Unionist Party, inquired about the technical issues affecting the Portadown-Belfast-Bangor train line following the opening of Grand Central Station. The Minister for Infrastructure acknowledged minor teething issues but emphasized that the overall impact on passenger numbers was positive.

== Gallery ==
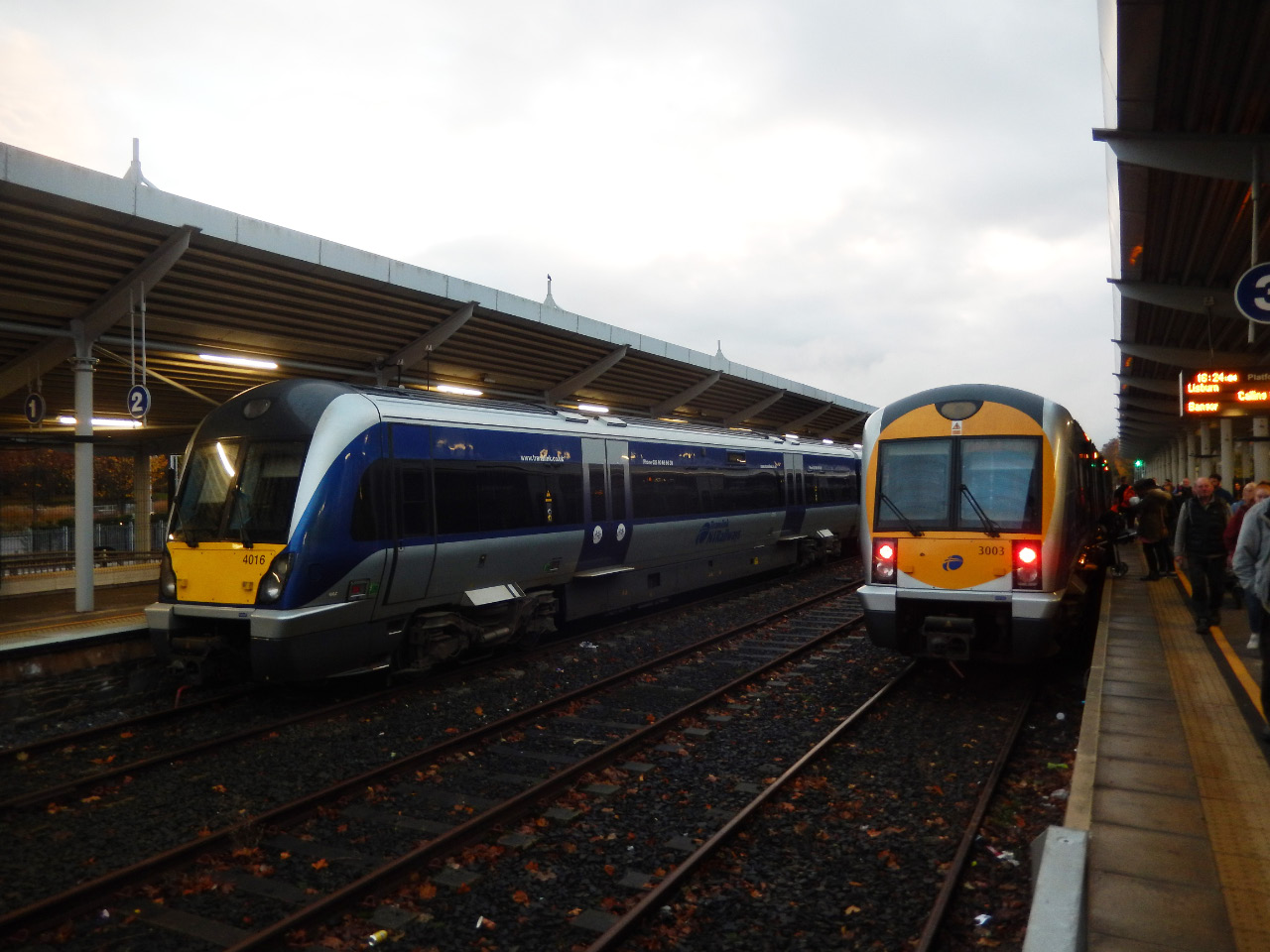
Bangor Station

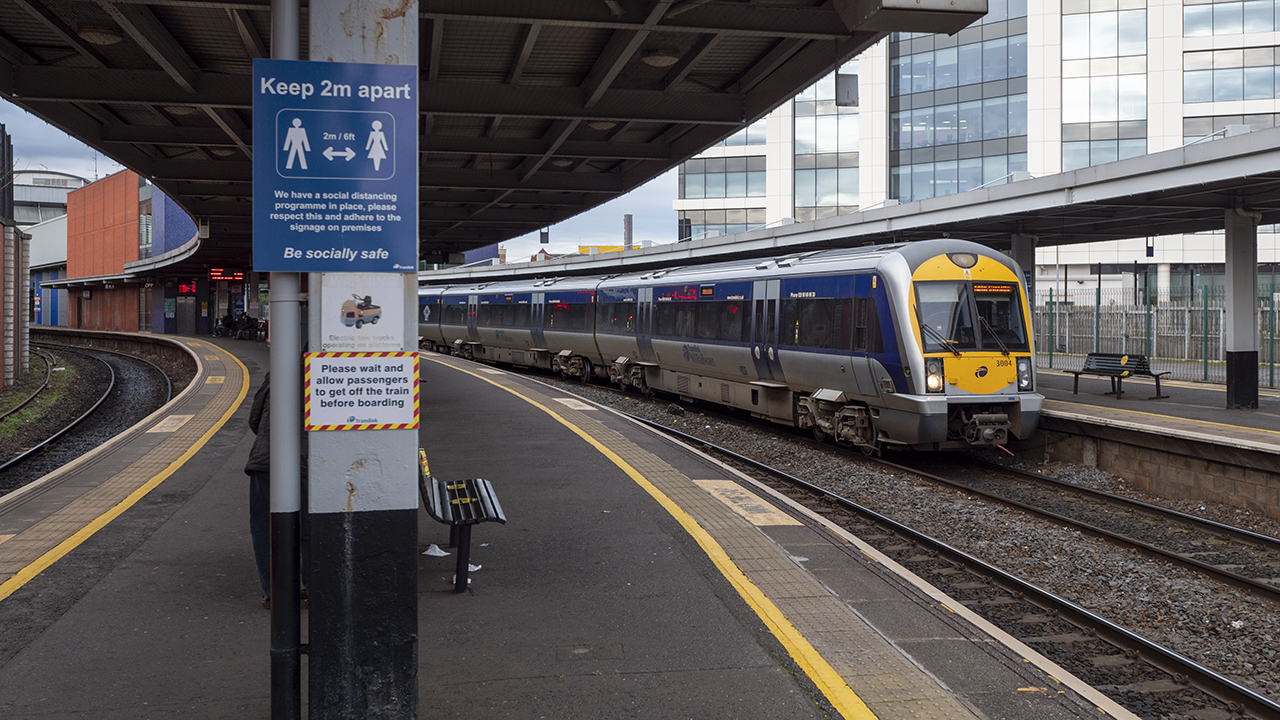
Belfast Lanyon Place Station

Cultra station

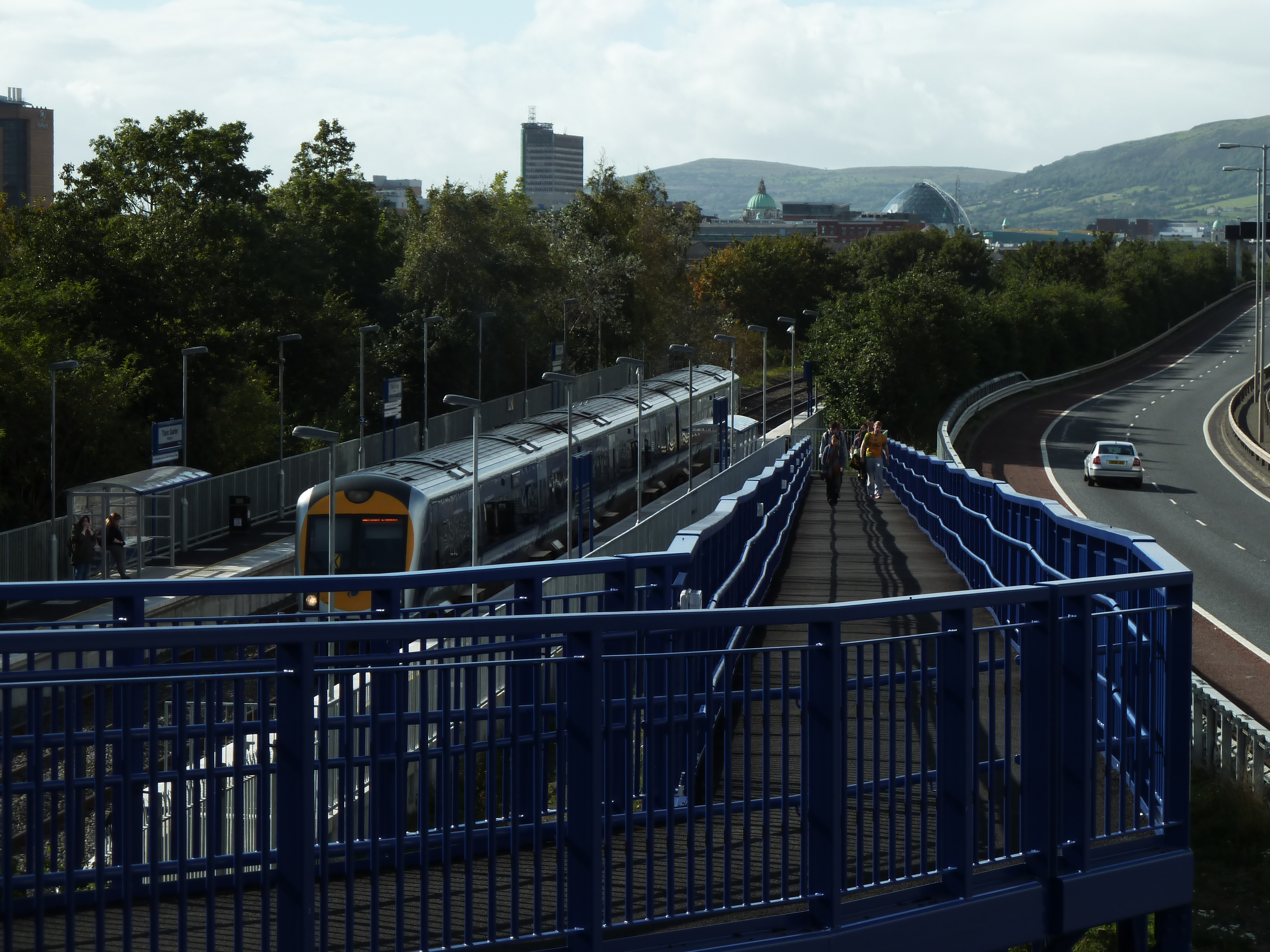
Titanic Quarter train station

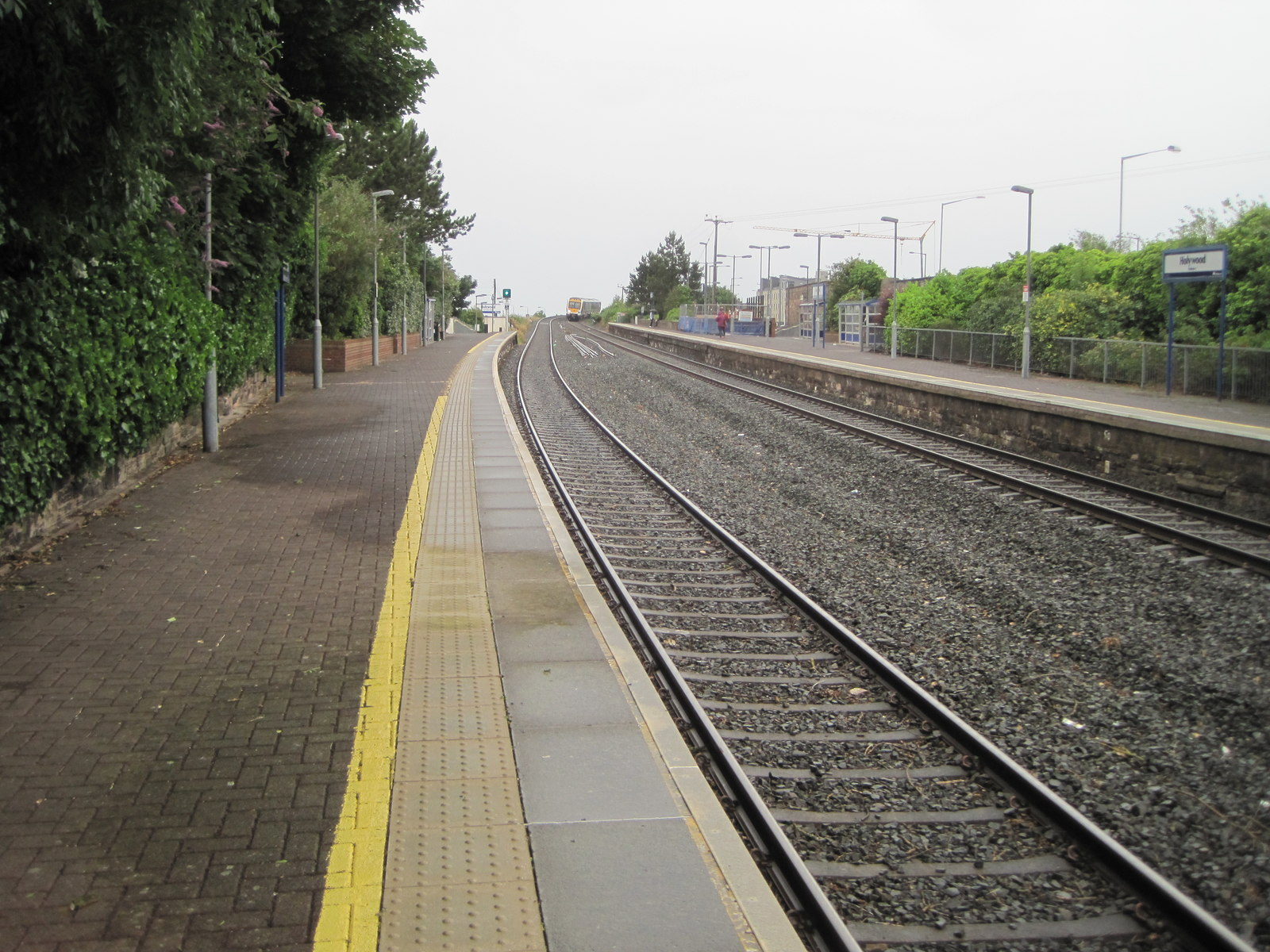
Holywood railway station

Approaching Bangor West

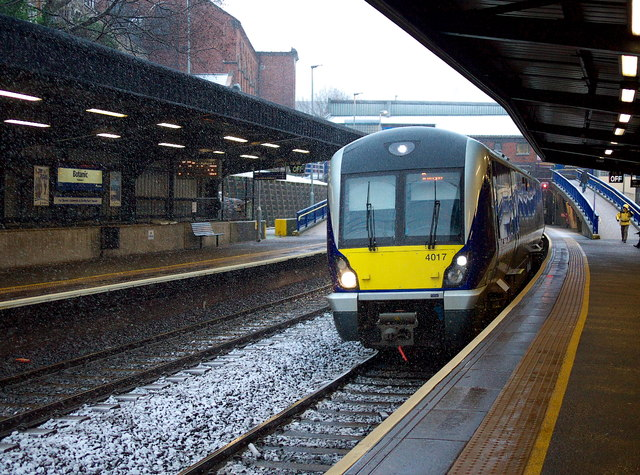
Botanic Station

== See also ==
- NI Railways
- Belfast and County Down Railway
- Ulster Transport Authority
- Rail transport in Ireland
- History of rail transport in Ireland

== Sources ==
- Pue, R.J.A. (1975). Twenty-five years gone. Millisle: The Belfast & County Down Railway Museum Trust. ISBN 0-905196-00-7.
