= Bangor Bus and Rail Centre =

Railway station in County Down, Northern Ireland

Bangor
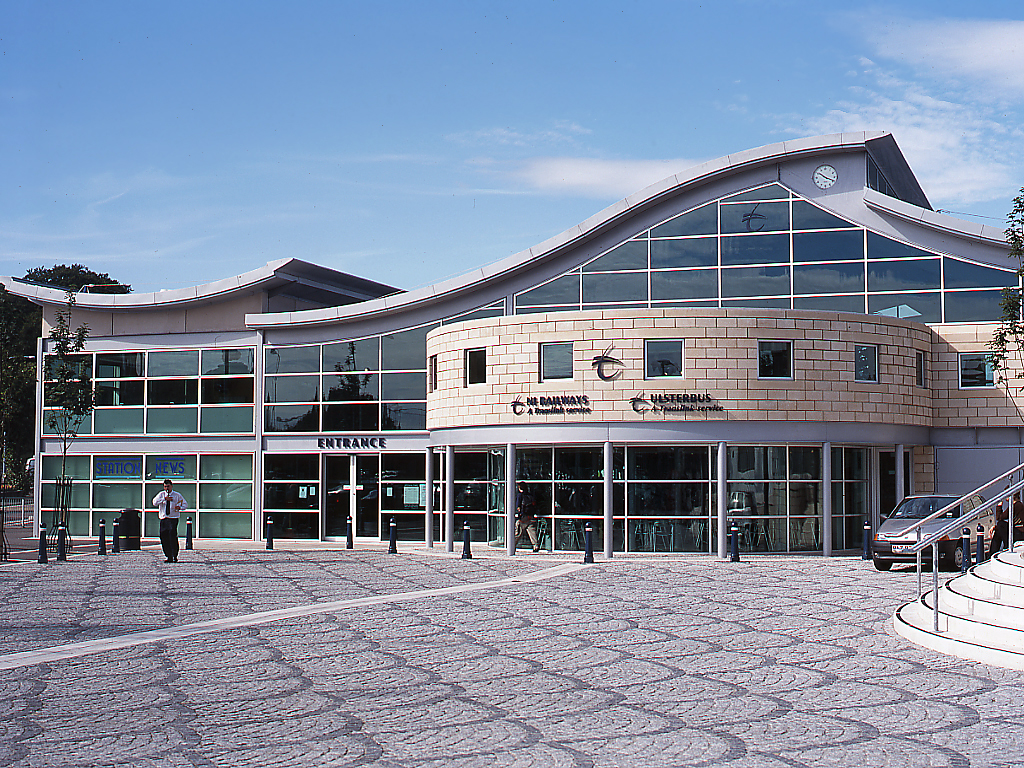
- Bangor Combined Railway and bus station was formally opened in 2001.

General information
- Location: Bangor; Northern Ireland
- Coordinates: 54.6585°N 5.6725°W
- Owner: NI Railways
- Operator: NI Railways
- Line: Bangor
- Platforms: 3
- Tracks: 3 (At Platforms); 4 (In Total)

Construction
- Structure type: At-grade

Other information
- Station code: BR

Key dates
- 1865: Original station opened
- 2001: Current station opened

Passengers
- 2022/23: 1.301 million
- 2023/24: ▲1.635 million
- 2024/25: ▼1.631 million
- 2025/26: ▲1.728 million
- NI Railways; Translink; NI railway stations
Route map
(Click to expand)
Location
- Location within Northern Ireland Location within island of Ireland

Bangor Bus and Rail Centre is a combined rail and bus interchange which serves the city of Bangor in County Down, Northern Ireland.

The station in its current form was built in the year 2000 to celebrate the new millennium.

== History ==
The station was opened by the Belfast and County Down Railway on 1 May 1865 and closed to goods traffic on 24 April 1950.

Daylight saving time was introduced by the Summer Time Act 1916 and implemented on 1 October 1916 as GMT plus one hour and Dublin Mean Time plus one hour. However, Dublin Mean Time (used by the railways) had a disparity of twenty-five minutes with Greenwich Mean Time, which meant that the Bangor Railway Station Clock was to be put back only thirty-five minutes instead of one hour. An additional complication was that the clocks in Belfast and Bangor were twenty-three minutes and thirty-nine seconds behind Greenwich Mean Time (not twenty-five minutes as in Dublin), so the final adjustment was thirty-six minutes and twenty-one seconds. The change to the time displayed on the Bangor Station Clock was not welcomed by commuters.

The station buildings were originally erected in 1864–1865 to designs by the architect Charles Lanyon. Following World War 2, however, refurbishments made by the Ulster Transport Authority to this Italianate structure damaged the original Lanyon-designed building, stripping it of much of its original brickwork. The company then rebuilt the building, before it was reconstructed again to a new design in 2000.

In the year 2001, then-mayor of Bangor Alan Chambers sealed a time capsule under the foyer of the station which is to be opened in 2101.

== Services ==
Mondays to Saturdays, there is generally a half-hourly service towards Belfast Grand Central, with additional services operating during weekday peak periods. Services are less frequent during the late evening.

Some weekday peak services operate on a limited-stop basis. Certain services call at Bangor West before running non-stop to Holywood, while other peak services omit a number of intermediate stations before reaching Lanyon Place.

On Sundays, there is generally an hourly service towards Belfast, calling at all stations to Belfast Grand Central.

The railway station is staffed and has three platforms. Access between the station concourse and the platforms is through ticket barriers.

Preceding station	NI Railways	Following station
Bangor West	Northern Ireland Railways; Belfast-Bangor Line	Terminus
