= MPR =

MPR may refer to:

== Medicine ==
- The MMR vaccine, from Latin morbilli (measles), parotitis (mumps) and rubella
- Mannose 6-phosphate receptor, a family of transmembrane proteins that help transport proteins from the Golgi apparatus
- Median price ratio, for drug costs
- Membrane progesterone receptor, a group of cell surface receptors for progesterone
- Multi-planar reformatting, or multiplanar reconstruction, a medical imaging technique – see CT scan#Multiplanar_reconstruction
- Monthly Prescribing Reference, an online drug reference for healthcare professionals

== Organizations ==
- A local abbreviation for Popular Movement of the Revolution, a political party in the Democratic Republic of the Congo
- Chadian People's Revolutionary Movement, a Chadian rebel group that operated in the 1980s
- Minnesota Public Radio
- Missouri Pacific Railroad
- Mongolian People's Republic
- People's Consultative Assembly, Majelis Permusyawaratan Rakyat, the Indonesian body comprising both legislative houses
- Swedish National Board for Measurement and Testing, later changed to Swedish Board for Accreditation and Conformity Assessment (SWEDAC)
- Russian Naval Infantry, Morskaya Pekhota Rossii, the amphibious warfare branch of the Russian Navy

== Other uses ==
- Matched precipitation rate, an irrigation term when all sprinkler heads in a zone apply water equally
- Magnetic proton recoil neutron spectrometer
- Meter point reference
- Microparticle performance rating, used to measure an air filter's ability to capture small particles (< 1 micrometre)
- Minkowski Portal Refinement, a computer algorithm for detecting collision (overlap) between convex shapes
- Montpelier (Amtrak station), Amtrak code for a station in Vermont, United States
- MPR Hopf algebra in mathematics
- Multipacket Reception, a term in wireless receiver technology.
- Multipoint relay in Computer Networks
- Multi-Purpose Room (Gym)
- My Pokémon Ranch, a video game
- Moisture to Protein Ratio, commonly used in the production of Salami
- Moat Park Rangers, football club in Dundonald, Northern Ireland
- Mid-Pleistocene Revolution, a climax change involving glacial periodicity in quaternary geology, around 900,000 years ago.
