= Dublin Rams =

- Founded: 2007
- Disbanded: 2010
- League: Irish Ice Hockey League
- Based in: Dublin, Ireland
- Arena: Various
- Colours: White, Blue & Black
- Head coach: Zachary Baylis
- Manager: Eric Freeman

The Dublin Rams were an ice hockey team that used to play in the now defunct Irish Ice Hockey League. One of five teams in the newly formed league, they were coached by Zachary Baylis.

== History ==
The Rams were created in February 2007 to add depth to the newly created Irish League. Their home rink was the Dundalk Ice Dome, and they were one of three teams that play out of Dublin, along with the Flyers IHC and Latvian Hawks. Their Club President, John Podedworny, is also the President of Dunkin' Donuts. In addition, the Rams had an A team in the NHL Development Division.

In the inaugural 2007–08 season, the Rams finished with 11 wins, 1 overtime loss, and 4 losses, and were positioned in 2nd place in the IIHL with 34 points. The Rams were the only team during the regular season to defeat the Dundalk Bulls when they did so on February 16, 2008. The Dublin Rams went on to defeat the Flyers IHC in the IIHL semi-finals by a score of 4–1. In the first ever all Ireland final, the Rams lost to the Dundalk Bulls by a score of 6–3 in a well-fought game.

The Rams finished the 2008-09 season with 9 wins and 6 losses. The Rams were disbanded in 2010 when the IIHL suddenly shut down midway through the 2009-10 season due to the closure of the Dundalk Ice Dome.

== Roster (2008) ==
Goaltenders
#		Player	Catches	Acquired	Place of Birth
3	(Canada)	Sean Gibson	L	2007	Lethbridge, Alberta, Canada
96	(Canada)	Robert Mackenzie (A)	L	2013	Hamilton, Ontario, Canada
1	(Canada)	Eric Tobia	L	2007	Cloyne, Ontario, Canada

Defensemen
#		Player	Shoots	Acquired	Place of Birth
9	(Republic of Ireland)	David Clark	R	2007	Dublin, Ireland
20	(Canada)	Bret Dilabbio	L	2007	Hamilton, Ontario, Canada
18	(Canada)	Thomas Hartley	R	2008	Balzac, Alberta, Canada
51	(Canada)	Brian Sherwood (C)	R	2013	Hamilton, Ontario, Canada
8	(Canada)	Adrian Huang	L	2007	Vancouver, British Columbia, Canada
16	(Canada)	Brent Trull	R	2007	Toronto, Ontario, Canada
13	(Slovakia)	Tomas Kuzma	L	2007	Slovakia
6	(Republic of Ireland)	Cliff Saunders	L	2007	Dublin, Ireland

Forwards
#		Player	Position	Shoots	Acquired	Place of Birth
74	(Canada)	Joseph Lodge (A)	F	R	2013	Hamilton, Ontario, Canada
10	(United States)	Brad Heraghty	F	R	2008	Farmington, MI, United States
15	(Canada)	Hunter Cape	C	L	2007	Toronto, Canada
23	(Canada)	Brandon Chalazan	C	R	2007	Saskatoon, Saskatchewan, Canada
5	(Canada)	Matt Hearn	F	L	2007	St. John's, Newfoundland and Labrador, Canada
69	(Canada)	Alison Dungey	C	R	2013	Hamilton, Ontario, Canada
21	(Canada)	Andrew Moriarty	F	L	2007	Montreal, Quebec, Canada
11	(Canada)	Aaron Murphy	F	L	2007	St. John's, Newfoundland and Labrador, Canada
89	(Republic of Ireland)	Seamus Creedmire	F	L	2007	Dublin, Ireland
12	(Republic of Ireland)	Aaron Cuskeran	F	R	2007	Dundonald, Northern Ireland
7	(Republic of Ireland)	Stephen Hamill	F	R	2008	Dundonald, Northern Ireland
25	(Republic of Ireland)	Willy Morrison	F	R	2008	Dundonald, Northern Ireland
