= Moat Park =

Park in Belfast, Northern Ireland

Coordinates: 54°35′36″N 5°48′30″W

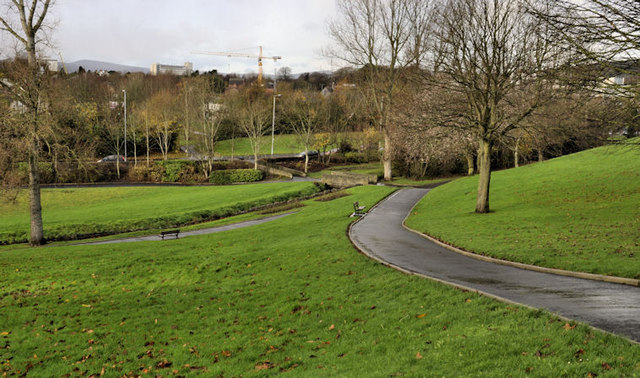
Moat park, moat bridge can be seen in the distance

Moat Park (/məʊt/) is a large public park located in Dundonald, Belfast, Northern Ireland. The Moat Park area also includes residential areas such as Moatview Park and Park Avenue.

Situated in East Belfast, Dundonald, leads off the Upper Newtownards Road, Comber Road and East Link Road. The surrounding area features Dundonald Village, Dundonald Primary School, Ulster Hospital, McDonald's, and St. Elizabeth's Church and Graveyard. The Enler River flows through the park.

Facilities include a bowling pavilion, basketball court, outdoor gym, playing fields, children's play park walks and nature areas. The centerpiece of Moat Park is the Moat Hill, a Norman motte-and-bailey from the 13th century. Moat Park also has a memorial for WWI and WWII known as the Garden of Reflection, which holds remembrance services. Events and maintenance is managed by the Lisburn and Castlereagh City Council.

== History ==
In the 12th century, the Anglo-Normans had settled in Dundonald. They built a church (now St. Elizabeth's Church), fort and a hill. The name "moat" the motte-and-bailey. During the Bruce Invasion, the church and fort were destroyed. No remains of the fort exist but the man-made hill still stands, steps were built in the 1960's for accessibility to the top.

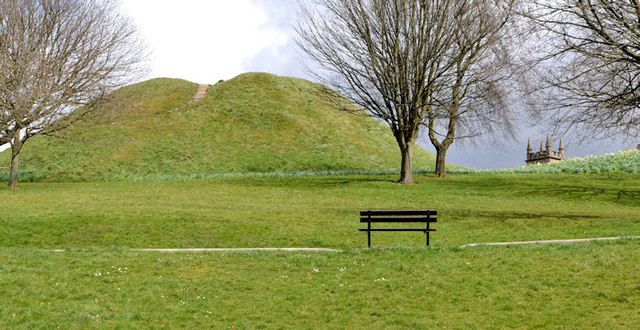
The Moat Hill

Queen's University Belfast had conducted an excavation and examination on St. Elizabeth's and Moat Hill by the Centre for Archaeological Fieldwork - School of Archaeology and Palaeoecology, funded by the Northern Ireland Environmental Agency. Finding dated back to the medieval period and Anglo-Norman period. Findings included that since the Bruce Invasion, a rath adjacent to the motte at the north-east was likely to have been used to serve the purpose of the Motte was reused during the Norman occupation period.

In 2016, the LCCC announced the opening of a micro habitat, the WildLife Garden. Funded by the Department for Agriculture, Environment and Rural Affairs, through the Challenge Fund Initiative, it was designed to bring a wider range of plants and animals to Moat Park.

In 2017, members from Rivers Agency Northern Ireland (DARDNI) conducted a case study known as the Enler River enhancement project. This project was to help fish habitat restoration by creating wider channels, aid spawning gravels and creation of groynes.

The Old Moat Inn, was a bar that was situated on the Upper Newtownards Road park entrance. The bar was renamed to as Tom's Cabin and then Lewis Community Tavern. On 31 January 2019, the Northern Ireland Fire and Rescue Service received a call at 08:16 GMT to say that the Lewis Community Tavern was on fire. Over 30 firefighters attended the scene to deal with the incident. The building could not be saved, and the site remains derelict.

In 2021, LCCC Mayor Alderman Stephen Martin joined the South Eastern Health and Social Care Trust to welcome 14 new trees to Moat Park as part of Lisburn & Castlereagh City Council’s Northern Ireland Centenary Programme.

Following heavy rainfall associated with Storm Bert in November 2024, homes on Park Drive and Park Avenue were affected by significant flooding. The severe conditions led to the evacuation of most residents from the area. The nearby Purple Vine Orange Lodge provided emergency shelter for those displaced, and the affected area was subsequently cordoned off by authorities.

In July 2025, Dundonald Purple Vine hosted "Dundonald Orangefest", to celebrate the return of the Twelfth of July hosted in Dundonald for the first time since 1967. Events took place at the Moat Park Pavilion.

== Sport ==
Moat Park Rangers F.C. play at the moat playing fields in the Down Area Winter Football League. Beside the playing fields are the Moat Bowls Club and pavilion and Basketball Court. The pavilion is a multi-use facility, which is also used for changing rooms for sports teams, a music room, facilitating for local events.
