= Ardcarn, Belfast =

Housing estate in Belfast, Northern Ireland

Coordinates: 54°35′32″N 5°49′28″W

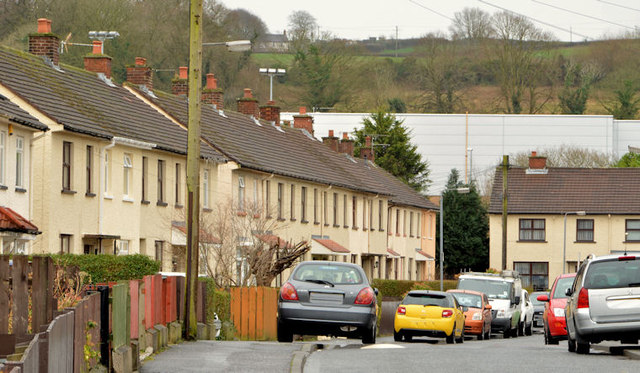
Ardcarn Drive, Ardcarn Estate

Ardcarn, (Irish: Árd-Carna, Árd-charna) is a Protestant working-class housing estate located in Dundonald, East Belfast, Northern Ireland. The estate sits off the Upper Newtownards Road, across from Stormont. Dundonald Cemetery lies to the side the estate, with the Comber Greenway, Tullycarnet and East Point Entertainment Village lying behind it.

== History ==
Ardcarn Estate was built in the 1950s, by the Northern Ireland Housing Trust. It features a 15-storey tower block, known as Carnet House. Also built in the 1950s, it received renovations in 2015. However in 2024, the residents of Carnet House were given a "decades notice", as it is a part of the Northern Ireland Housing Executive's "action plan" for the demolition of tower blocks across the country.

== Etymology ==
The name "Ardcarn" comes from Old Irish, with Árd meaning "high" or "height". Carn refers to generally as "natural stone pile" or simply "mound" or "hill".

== Notable residents ==
- George Cassidy, jazz musician, lead saxophonist in the Regal Accordion and Saxophone Band, and music teacher to Van Morrison, lived in Ardcarn Drive.
