= Donard Hospital F.C. =

Association football club in Northern Ireland

Donard Hospital
- Full name: Donard Hospital Football Club
- Founded: 1989
- Dissolved: 2016
- Ground: Billy Neill Complex, Comber Road
- League: Northern Amateur Football League

Donard Hospital Football Club was a Northern Irish that played in the Northern Amateur Football League. The club was formed in 1989 by an amalgamation of St Donard's and Ulster Hospital. St Donard's was founded in connection with St Donard's Parish (Church of Ireland) Church in Bloomfield, Belfast, in 1964 and played in the Irish Churches' League until 1981, during which time it reached the County Antrim Junior Shield final in 1969–70. From 1981 to 1989 the club played in the Amateur League. Ulster Hospital, founded in 1974, was connected to the hospital of the same name in Dundonald, and joined the Amateur League in the year of its foundation. The amalgamated club achieved intermediate status in 1990. The club played at the Billy Neill Playing Fields, Dundonald. It folded in 2016.

== See also ==
- List of association football clubs in Northern Ireland
- St. Elizabeth's F.C.
