= St. Elizabeth's, Dundonald =

Church site in Northern Ireland

Coordinates: 54.5936°N 5.8059°W

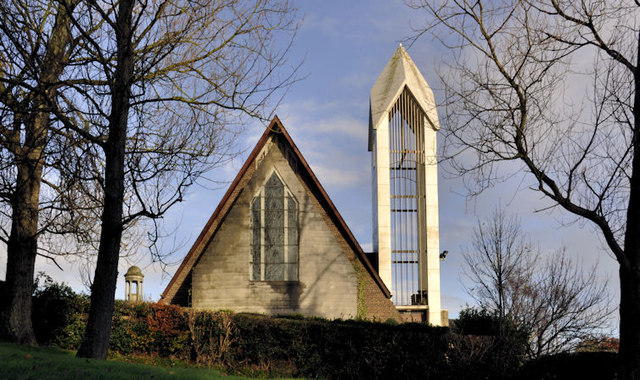
Side view of the modern St. Elizabeth's Church building, Cleland Mausoleum in the background

St. Elizabeth's, is a religious site for St. Elizabeth's Church and St. Elizabeth's Church Graveyard located at Church Green, Dundonald, Northern Ireland. The site sits on the townland of Church Quarter, beside the Moat Park and off Church Road, Dundonald. It is an active Anglican Christian parish church under the Church of Ireland.

St. Elizabeth's Church, also known and originally as Dundonald Parish Church, dates back to the 14th century, it was rebuilt beside the original site in 1966. The original church building is still standing, surrounded by St. Elizabeth's Church Graveyard form the medieval period. Dundonald Library faces Church Green.

== Church quarter ==
Church Quarter is a townland that covers the St. Elizabeth's and Church Green. The Enler River flows through it. Daffodils are commonly spotted throughout Church Quarter, which also features on the Dundonald Primary School badge.

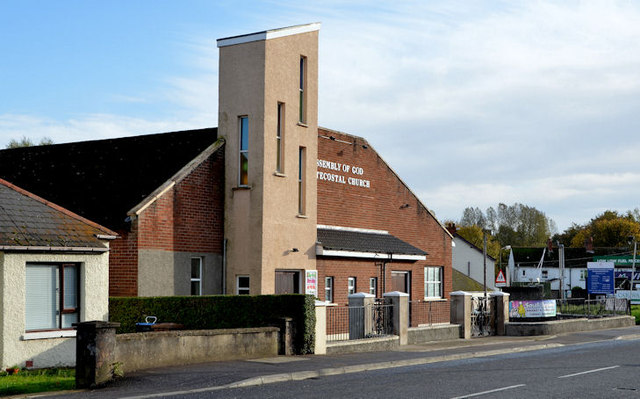
Pentecostal Church, Comber Road, Church Quarter

Places in Church Quarter include the majority of Moat Park, portions of Church Road, Comber Road, and all of Leatham Square and Cumberland Estate.

Shops and restaurants are in the areas of Dundonald Village and Comber Road shops. The Elk, a public house, originally known as The Central Bar is the longest running bar in Dundonald. It is currently known as the Crafty Elk.

Dundonald Pentecostal Church, Dundonald Gospel Hall, Dundonald Assembly of God Church, Dundonald Elim Church and are within Church Quarter.

Sir Daniel Dixon Memorial Hall is occupied by Dundonald Purple Vine, an Orange Lodge, as well as Dundonald RBP 482 of the Royal Black Institution, and the Dundonald Browning Club of the Apprentice Boys of Derry. The Dundonald Purple Vine are members of the Holywood District in the Orange Order. In 2025, they organised the Twelfth of July parade and Orangefest, that took place in the Moat Park pavilion in Church Quarter. A large portion of the route for the Orange walk also took place in Church Quarter.

The Kosy Social Club, beside the Dundonald Orange Hall is a members bar serving the Dundonald community.

In 2016, Church Quarter was included in the Ulster-Scots Agency's Edward Bruce 700 Heritage Trail, a milestone made of Mourne granite was unveiled.

=== Church Green ===
Church Green contains St. Elizabeth's Church, including the Church Graveyard and 1771 building, as well as St. Elizabeth's Church Halls, a smaller red brick building to the right.

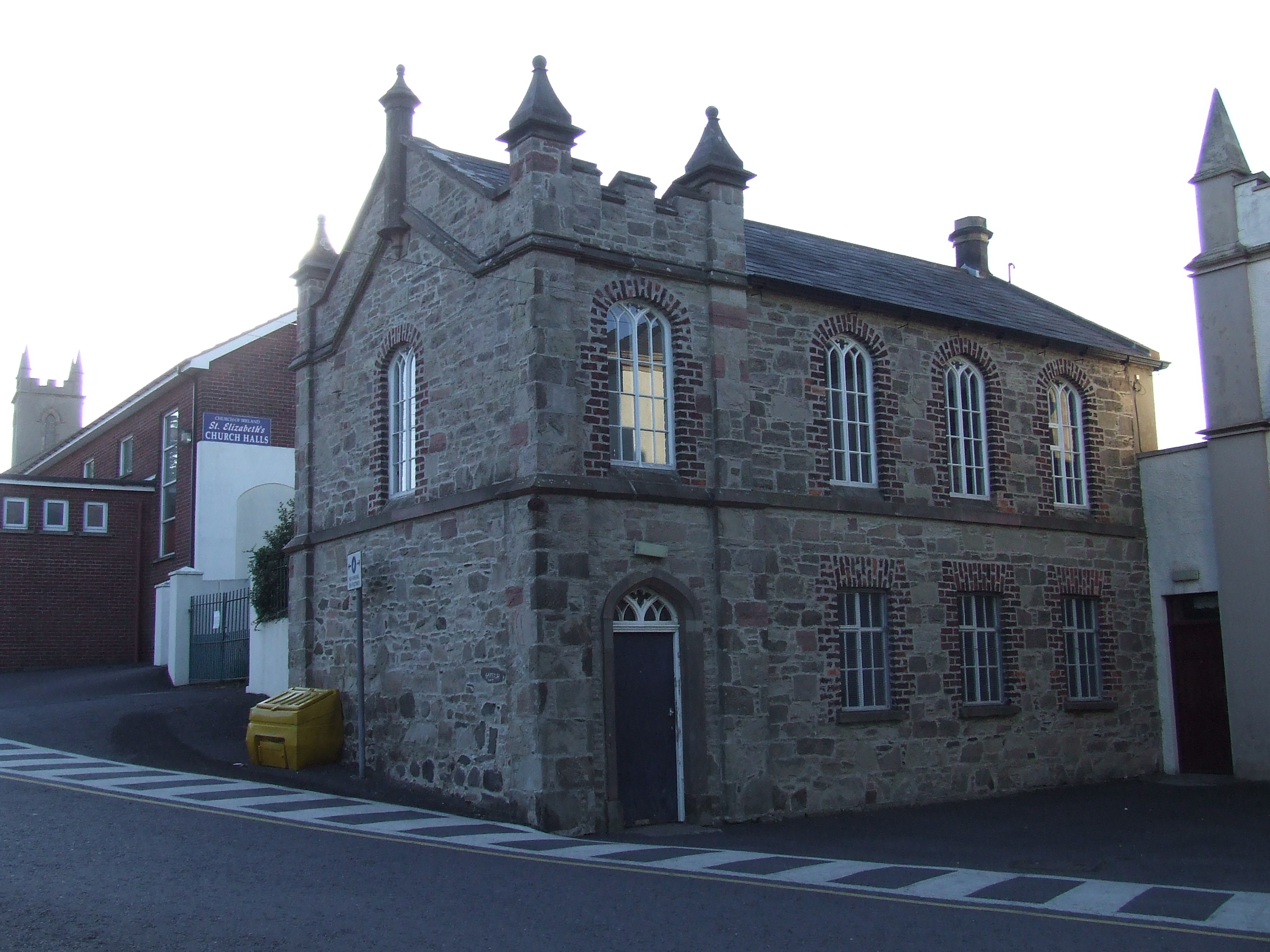
Former National School, built in 1844

Church Green also includes Dundonald Presbyterian Church, and Church Green Church Halls, owned by the Presbyterian Church.

Dundonald Presbyterian Church is one of the oldest Presbyterian congregations in Ireland, with its first minister being installed in 1645. The former National School is now a part of the Presbyterian Church, which was built in 1844.

In 2016, Dundonald Presbyterian Church received a £1.85m refurbishment. It was reopened by Presbyterian Moderator Dr Frank Sellar and the minister, Rev. William McCully.

The Church Halls is the home of "Evolv Fitness NI", a fitness centre. They organise DPC Youth social nights, Bible study, Girl's Brigade and Boy's Brigade.

Church Green also has a car park, a small amount of houses and Dundonald library.

Church Green can be used to gain access to Upper Newtownards Road via Church Road, and access to Moat Park and Dundonald Primary School.

== Etymology ==
Church Quarter is given its name for being a religious site and having an abundance of churches in the area. Church Quarter churches include Dundonald Presbyterian, St. Elizabeth's, Dundonald Pentecostal Church, Dundonald Elim Church, Dundonald Gospel Hall and Dundonald Assembly of God Church.

Dundonald Parish Church was renamed to St. Elizabeth's Church in memory of Eliza Cleland in 1892, when the congregation met in the original church building.

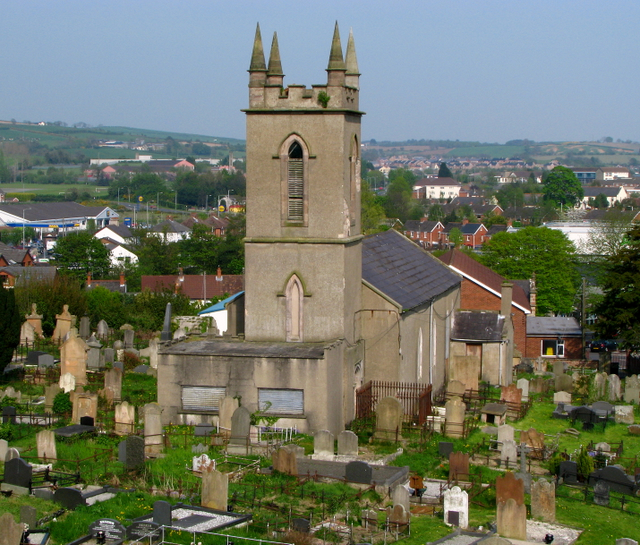
The old, derelict St. Elizabeth's Church building located within the St. Elizabeth's Church Graveyard

== History ==
St. Elizabeth's Church Graveyard was the first graveyard in Dundonald. Due to its small size and increasing population in Belfast, Dundonald Cemetery opened in 1905.

The Churchyard features the Cleland Mausoleum, in memory of Samuel Cleland in 1842. It is the tallest such tomb in Northern Ireland. It was built using blue granite with columns and canopy. It was erected by his wife at a cost of £2000. Samuel Cleland was a landlord of the Stormont Estate. The mausoleum was built at height so it could be seen from the Cleland family home, Stormont Castle.

In the early 20th-century, Agnes Romily White's Father was the rector of the church.

In 2014, the modern building went under construction, which seen a new car park and front exterior.

Queen's University Belfast School of Geography, Archaeology and Paleoecology completed excavations and examinations on the old church and graveyard, lasting 8 weeks. The work was carried out by the Centre for Archaeological Fieldwork, and was funded by the Northern Ireland Environment Agency.

From the study, in which Queen's still monitor the Church and Graveyard, found that it had been originally built as early as the 14th century, and was likely perished during the Bruce invasion, were the motte and bailey (now known as the moat hill) was destroyed. Following this, no records exist until the 17th century.

== Notable St. Elizabeth's Churchyard burials ==
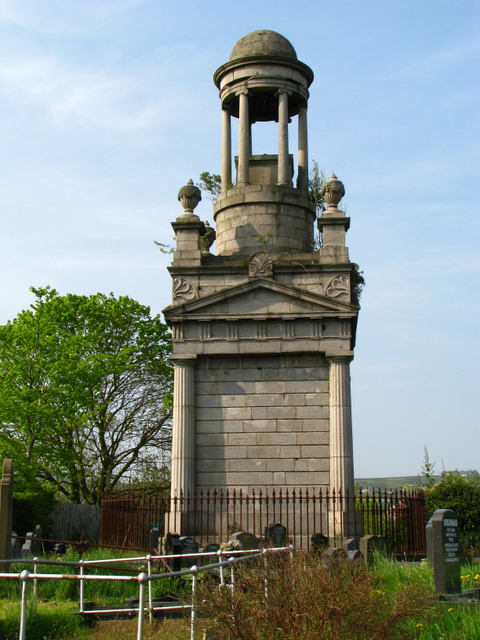
The Cleland Mausoleum, built for Samuel Jackson Cleland in 1842

=== Dundonald Land Owners ===
- Cleland Family members: buried in the Cleland Mausoleum.
- Samuel Jackson Cleland (1808–1842) Landowner in Dundonald and the primary heir to the Stormont Estate.
- Eliza Cleland: Wife of John Cleland. She commissioned the tomb for her husband. Dundonald Parish Church was renamed "St. Elizabeth's" in her honor.
- "Black John" Cleland (1755–1834): Samuel’s father, buried in the family plot, was one of the most controversial figures in County Down history. As the land agent for the Stewart family (the Marquesses of Londonderry) and a magistrate, he was a staunch Loyalist and Orangeman. He was notorious for his ruthless suppression of the United Irishmen during the 1798 Rebellion, specifically by turning informants against their leaders.
- Robb family; Alexander Robb: synonymous figures from Dundonald, who helped shape the village, and owned the vast majority of the townland of Ballybeen for generations. "Robbs Road" is named after them. The road acted as a boundary and access point for the family's primary residence, Ballybeen House.

=== Art and clergy ===
- Agnes Romilly White (1872–1945): author, who wrote "Gape Row" and "Graine’s Gate".
- Rev. Robert White: (father of Agnes Romilly White, he served as the Rector of St. Elizabeth’s in the late 19th and early 20th centuries.
- Rev. Edward Thompson Martin: A long-serving minister whose memorial reflects the deep ties between the church and the Presbyterian community in the village during the 1800s.
- James Hodge: The local mason who actually built the 1804 iteration of the church. His headstone is an important piece of the "physical" history of the village.

=== Military graves and war memorials ===
==== American Revolutionary War ====
Lieut. Colonel Robert McLeroth (c. 1740–1805): A veteran of the American Revolutionary War, McLeroth entered His Majesty’s Service in 1769 with the 57th Regiment of Foot. Known for his merit and popularity as a "brave and benevolent" officer, he served during the British campaigns in America.

==== World War I ====
- Private John Ireland: Soldier of the 15th Bn. Devonshire Regiment, who was killed in World War I on 6 September 1918. His inscription reads "in the midst of life we are in death.
- Private Thompson Gray (5th Canadian Infantry): Died of wounds in August 1917; his name is added to the family headstone in the churchyard.

==== World War II ====
- Flight Sergeant George Lynas Hosford (RAFVR): Died January 30, 1943, aged 22. He was a WWII pilot and recipient of the George Medal, one of the highest honors for bravery not in the face of the enemy. Dundonald Primary School, which sits beside Church Green, visit George Hosford's grave around Remembrance Sunday.
- Sergeant William John Nolan (RASC): Killed during the Dunkirk evacuation in 1940. He is commemorated on a headstone here, though his name is officially on the Dunkirk Memorial in France.

=== Maritime history ===
- Captain Hawthorne (1852-1892): Captain of the ship known as "Dundonald", who was washed overboard during a voyage returning home from San Francisco.
- Lieutenant Commander Douglas Bilney: A Royal Navy veteran who, along with his wife Ruby, is buried in the churchyard. They were victims of the MV Princess Victoria disaster in 1953 (the worst peacetime maritime disaster in British coastal waters).
- There are local Harland & Wolff shipbuilders buried in the churchyard of who contributed to the building of the Titanic.

== Sport ==
St. Elizabeth's Football Club (now defunct) represented the church, winning the 1954–55 season NAFL 2 Division A. They were runners-up twice. They were nicknamed the "hatchet men".
