= Dundonald Cemetery =

Cemetery in Northern Ireland

Coordinates: 54°35′31″N 5°49′12″W

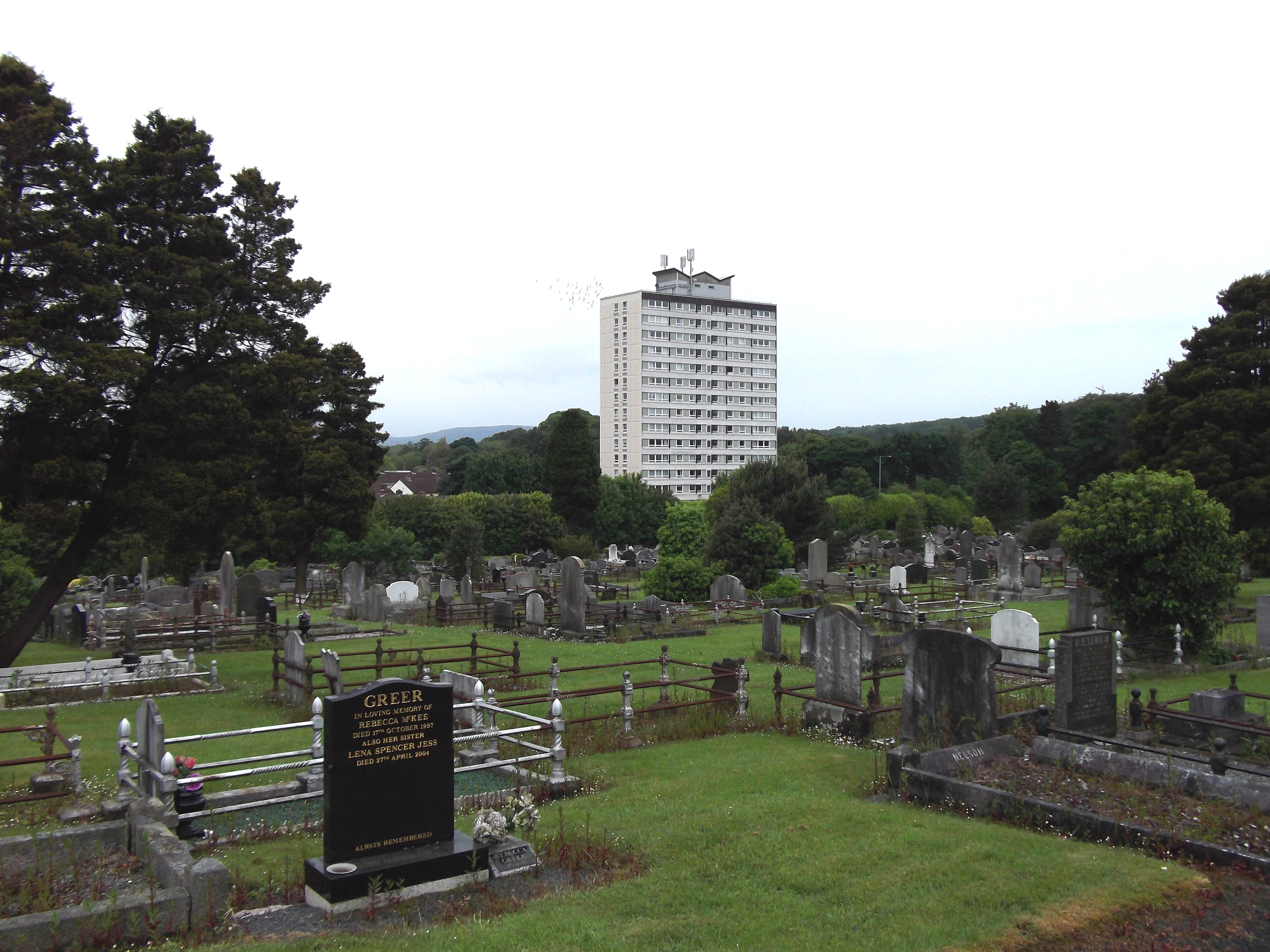
Dundonald Cemetery, Ardcarn flats can be seen in the background

Dundonald Cemetery is a large cemetery in Dundonald, Northern Ireland. It opened in 1905 as a municipal burial ground. It is a closed cemetery, except for spaces in existing plots. It is located beside Ardcarn, on the Upper Newtownards Road, East Belfast. The site was originally known as Donall’s Fortress, named after a nearby fort.

== History ==
In 1895, it was decided by Belfast City Council (known as the Belfast Corporation during this period) that more grave space was needed to cope with Belfast's rising population. Dundonald, already had a local cemetery, St. Elizabeth's Church Graveyard, a small cemetery. In 1897, the council bought 45 acres of land at Ballymiscaw, Dundonald for the price of £5,600. On 19 September 1905, the first burial took place. The cemetery was divided was a quarter allocated as Roman Catholic, which was later emended.

== Notable interments ==
The site contains graves connected to WWI and WWII and the Titanic.

- William Bradshaw Bell - OBE, JP (1935-2020), Ulster Unionist Party, Lord Mayor of Belfast, Member of the Northern Ireland Assembly - Lagan Valley
- Anne Crone (1915-1972), Irish novelist and teacher
- Johnny Darling (1877-1946), Irish footballer
- Sir Thomas Dixon (1868-1950), High Sheriff for Co. Antrim in 1912 and Co. Down in 1913., Lord-Lieutenant of the County Borough of Belfast
- Lady Edith Stewart Dixon (1871-1964), wife of Sir Thomas Dixon, Dame of the British Empire for her work with soldiers during World War I
- Brian Desmond Hurst (1895-1986), Irish film director
- James Norritt (1887-1963), businessman, High Sheriff, Lord Mayor and Senate of Northern Ireland
- Robert James Patterson (1868-1930), Irish Presbyterian minister, social reformer, and the founder of the worldwide Catch-My-Pal Total Abstinence Union
- William John Stewart (1868-1946) - MP for south Belfast
- Daniel Martin Wilson KC (1862-1932), Irish politician and judge
