= 2008–09 IIHF Continental Cup =

The Continental Cup 2008–09 was the 12th edition of the IIHF Continental Cup. The season started on September 19, 2008, and finished on January 18, 2009.

The tournament was won by MHC Martin, who led the final group.

The points system used in this tournament was: the winner in regular time won 3 points, the loser 0 points; in case of a tie, an overtime and a penalty shootout is played, the winner in penalty shootouts or overtime won 2 points and the loser won 1 point.

== Preliminary round ==
=== Group A ===
(Novi Sad, Serbia)

| Team #1 | Score | Team #2 |
|---|---|---|
| KHL Mladost (Croatia) | 13:4 | (Republic of Ireland) Dundalk Bulls |
| HK Novi Sad (Serbia) | 4:4 (0:1 PS) | (Bulgaria) HC Slavia Sofia |
| KHL Mladost (Croatia) | 11:2 | (Bulgaria) HC Slavia Sofia |
| HK Novi Sad (Serbia) | 4:2 | (Republic of Ireland) Dundalk Bulls |
| Dundalk Bulls (Republic of Ireland) | 6:4 | (Bulgaria) HC Slavia Sofia |
| HK Novi Sad (Serbia) | 4:1 | (Croatia) KHL Mladost |

=== Group A standings ===
| Rank | Team | Points |
|---|---|---|
| 1 | (Serbia) HK Novi Sad | 7 |
| 2 | (Croatia) KHL Mladost | 6 |
| 3 | (Republic of Ireland) Dundalk Bulls | 3 |
| 4 | (Bulgaria) HC Slavia Sofia | 2 |

== First Group Stage ==
=== Group B ===
(Elektrėnai, Lithuania)

| Team #1 | Score | Team #2 |
|---|---|---|
| Sokil Kiev (Ukraine) | 6:3 | (Netherlands) Tilburg Trappers |
| SC Energija (Lithuania) | 2:3 | (Poland) Cracovia |
| Cracovia (Poland) | 4:1 | (Netherlands) Tilburg Trappers |
| SC Energija (Lithuania) | 1:6 | (Ukraine) Sokil Kiev |
| Sokil Kiev (Ukraine) | 7:4 | (Poland) Cracovia |
| SC Energija (Lithuania) | 6:5 | (Netherlands) Tilburg Trappers |

=== Group B standings ===
| Rank | Team | Points |
|---|---|---|
| 1 | (Ukraine) Sokil Kiev | 9 |
| 2 | (Poland) Cracovia | 6 |
| 3 | (Lithuania) SC Energija | 3 |
| 4 | (Netherlands) Tilburg Trappers | 0 |

=== Group C ===
(Miercurea Ciuc, Romania)

| Team #1 | Score | Team #2 |
|---|---|---|
| Dunaújvárosi Acélbikák (Hungary) | 8:4 | (Serbia) HK Novi Sad |
| SC Miercurea Ciuc (Romania) | 12:1 | (Spain) Club Gel Puigcerdà |
| Dunaújvárosi Acélbikák (Hungary) | 8:1 | (Spain) Club Gel Puigcerdà |
| SC Miercurea Ciuc (Romania) | 8:1 | (Serbia) HK Novi Sad |
| Club Gel Puigcerdà (Spain) | 6:5 | (Serbia) HK Novi Sad |
| SC Miercurea Ciuc (Romania) | 1:4 | (Hungary) Dunaújvárosi Acélbikák |

=== Group C standings ===
| Rank | Team | Points |
|---|---|---|
| 1 | (Hungary) Dunaújvárosi Acélbikák | 9 |
| 2 | (Romania) SC Miercurea Ciuc | 6 |
| 3 | (Spain) Club Gel Puigcerdà | 3 |
| 4 | (Serbia) HK Novi Sad | 0 |

(Latvia) HK Liepājas Metalurgs, (Belarus) Keramin Minsk, (Slovenia) HDK Stavbar Maribor, (Kazakhstan) Gornyak Rudny, (Italy) HC Bolzano, (United Kingdom) Coventry Blaze : bye

== Second Group Stage ==
=== Group D ===
(Liepāja, Latvia)

| Team #1 | Score | Team #2 |
|---|---|---|
| Sokil Kiev (Ukraine) | 4:2 | (Belarus) Keramin Minsk |
| HK Liepājas Metalurgs (Latvia) | 5:2 | (Kazakhstan) Gornyak Rudny |
| Keramin Minsk (Belarus) | 4:0 | (Kazakhstan) Gornyak Rudny |
| HK Liepājas Metalurgs (Latvia) | 3:1 | (Ukraine) Sokil Kiev |
| Sokil Kiev (Ukraine) | 7:2 | (Kazakhstan) Gornyak Rudny |
| HK Liepājas Metalurgs (Latvia) | 2:5 | (Belarus) Keramin Minsk |

=== Group D standings ===
| Rank | Team | Points | |
|---|---|---|---|
| 1 | (Belarus) Keramin Minsk | 6 | (GF:7;GA:6) |
| 2 | (Ukraine) Sokil Kiev | 6 | (GF:5;GA:5) |
| 3 | (Latvia) HK Liepājas Metalurgs | 6 | (GF:5;GA:6) |
| 4 | (Kazakhstan) Gornyak Rudny | 0 | |

=== Group E ===
(Bolzano, Italy)

| Team #1 | Score | Team #2 |
|---|---|---|
| Coventry Blaze (United Kingdom) | 6:3 | (Slovenia) HDK Stavbar Maribor |
| HC Bolzano (Italy) | 5:2 | (Hungary) Dunaújvárosi Acélbikák |
| Coventry Blaze (United Kingdom) | 6:4 | (Hungary) Dunaújvárosi Acélbikák |
| HC Bolzano (Italy) | 4:2 | (Slovenia) HDK Stavbar Maribor |
| HDK Stavbar Maribor (Slovenia) | 3:2 | (Hungary) Dunaújvárosi Acélbikák |
| HC Bolzano (Italy) | 1:0 | (United Kingdom) Coventry Blaze |

=== Group E standings ===
| Rank | Team | Points |
|---|---|---|
| 1 | (Italy) HC Bolzano | 9 |
| 2 | (United Kingdom) Coventry Blaze | 6 |
| 3 | (Slovenia) HDK Stavbar Maribor | 3 |
| 4 | (Hungary) Dunaújvárosi Acélbikák | 0 |

(France) Dragons de Rouen, (Slovakia) MHC Martin : bye

== Final stage ==
=== Final Group ===
(Rouen, France)

| Team #1 | Score | Team #2 |
|---|---|---|
| MHC Martin (Slovakia) | 5:1 | (Belarus) Keramin Minsk |
| Dragons de Rouen (France) | 1:3 | (Italy) HC Bolzano |
| MHC Martin (Slovakia) | 7:3 | (Italy) HC Bolzano |
| Dragons de Rouen (France) | 6:4 | (Belarus) Keramin Minsk |
| HC Bolzano (Italy) | 7:1 | (Belarus) Keramin Minsk |
| Dragons de Rouen (France) | 5:4 | (Slovakia) MHC Martin |

=== Final Group standings ===
| Rank | Team | Points | |
|---|---|---|---|
| 1 | (Slovakia) MHC Martin | 6 | (GF:11;GA:8) |
| 2 | (France) Dragons de Rouen | 6 | (GF:6;GA:7) |
| 3 | (Italy) HC Bolzano | 6 | (GF:6;GA:8) |
| 4 | (Belarus) Keramin Minsk | 0 | |
