= Irish Hockey League =

Irish Hockey League may refer to:

== Field hockey ==
- Men's Irish Hockey League
- Women's Irish Hockey League

== Ice Hockey ==
- Irish Ice Hockey League
