= George Cassidy (jazz musician) =

Jazz saxophonist from Northern Ireland (1936–2023)

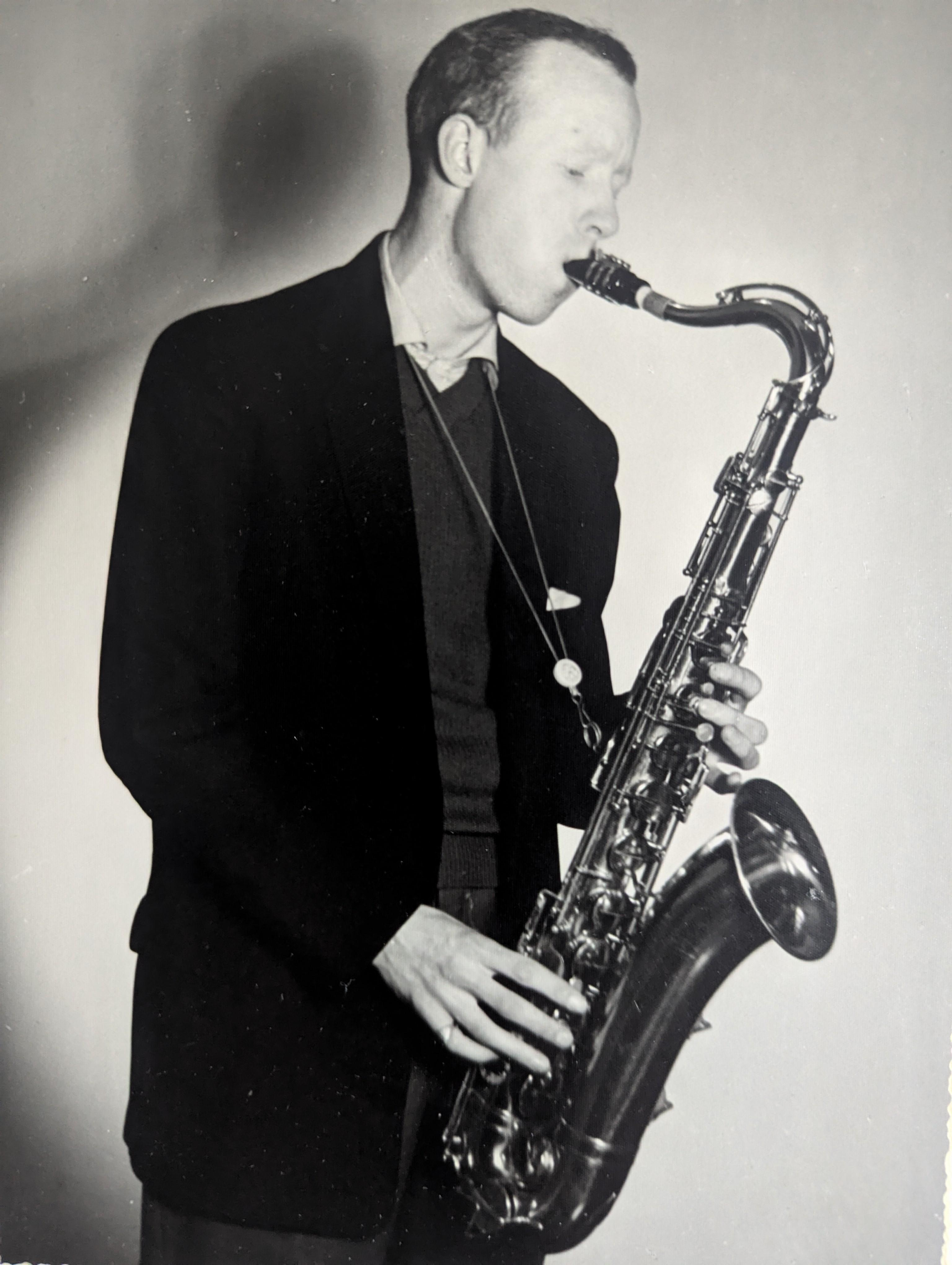
- Cassidy, playing his signature Henri Selmer Paris tenor saxophone, 1959

Background information
- Born: George Cassidy; 7 September 1936; Belfast, Northern Ireland
- Origin: Bloomfield, Belfast, Northern Ireland
- Died: 28 May 2023 (aged 86) Ulster Hospital, Dundonald, County Down
- Genres: Jazz, beat music, blues pop music
- Occupations: Jazz musician, music teacher
- Instruments: Tenor saxophone, clarinet, lap steel guitar, hurdy-gurdy
- Works: Biography
- Formerly of: The Springfields, The Regal Band

George Cassidy (7 September 1936 – 28 May 2023) was a Northern Irish jazz musician and music teacher from Bloomfield, Belfast, Northern Ireland, specializing in the tenor saxophone. He was also noted for teaching fellow Belfast musician Van Morrison music reading and notation and giving him saxophone lessons. Cassidy also played the clarinet, hurdy-gurdy and Hawaiian Guitar. Following a stint in a local beat band, Cassidy toured in Ireland playing saxophone behind Dusty Springfield with The Springfields. Cassidy was lead saxophonist with the Regal Accordion & Saxophone Band.

== History ==
=== Early life and an introduction to music ===
George Cassidy was born on 7 September 1936, at 49 Hyndford Street, Bloomfield, Belfast. He lived with his younger brother, Billy Cassidy, and his mother, Sarah "Sadie" Cassidy, and his father, William Cassidy, who worked as a clerk for Harland & Wolff. Cassidy attended Elmgrove Elementary School from 1940 until 1952. Hyndford Street became known for the location where Van Morrison also grew up, the two became close friends. As they lived on the same street, it became easily accessible for Morrison to practice and continue to learn. This in turn strengthened the bond between the two. George took inspiration from various artists, such as Matt Monro, whom he first met in Belfast. George Cassidy joined a Beat Band in Belfast as a saxophonist. Following this, Cassidy joined the East Belfast Pipe Band for a brief period. Cassidy then went on to join the Regal Accordion & Saxophone Band in the late 1950s. They were known for their unique style, energy and charisma. The band would play a variety of genres, including pop songs of the time, like "Yellow Submarine" by The Beatles, and traditional jazz.

George Cassidy had played a significant role in the early career of the musician Van Morrison. Their friendship and collaboration had a profound impact on Morrison's development as an artist. Van Morrison later said: "At 15, I was taking lessons from a guy called George Cassidy, who lived in the same street. He was a great jazz player. He had the chops." "When I started studying tenor saxophone as a kid in Belfast, I did so with a guy named George Cassidy, who was also a big inspiration."

As a tenor saxophonist, Cassidy performs using a Henri Selmer Paris instrument, noting its distinctive tonal quality and hand-made build.

=== The Springfields, The Regal Band and legacy ===
In 1960, Cassidy joined The Springfields in the Republic of Ireland. He was invited to join following a stint in a beat showband in Belfast. Cassidy garnered attention playing in the Plaza Ballroom, Belfast. He was a part of their first music ensemble and would play in various venues such as ballrooms. He returned to Belfast after feeling homesick.

Cassidy performed in various charitable, community, historic and remembrance events throughout Northern Ireland, such as annually at the Black Parade. The band was considered one of the most prominent musical groups in the country during the late 20th century, achieving critical acclaim and cultivating a dedicated fanbase through their energetic live performances and strong audience engagement. The Regal took lead of many parades, Cassidy was lead saxophonist. Aside from the centerpiece instruments - accordion and saxophone, the band also had trumpet players, and in percussion - snare drum, clash cymbals and bass drum. Cassidy with The Regal performed a number of times at The Grand Opera House, supporting act for Donald Peers and Nancy Whiskey. The sold-out event led them to return for a grand performance.

The band picked up songs outside the traditional songs played in the 20th century in Northern Ireland, such as When the Saints go marching in, Hokey Cokey, and Lily of Laguna. These performances made them very popular in areas around Belfast, Lisburn, Carrickfergus and Derry. They performed at various community and social events, in November 1987, they performed to support BBC Children in Need.

In September 1970, George Magill, conductor of The Regal Band arranged for their performance in regards to the Championship bands contest, at UEFA European Cup Winners' Cup tie between Linfield FC and Manchester City. Being a staple on remembrance day events, the Regal Band led on Remembrance Day, 11 November 1972, during the wreath-laying ceremony and sounding of "The Last Post".

In August 1985, The Regal Band gave their recitals at the Donaghadee Young Defenders band contest during the towns Festival Week, showing their "marvellous brand of music - marvellous sound from a multitude of different instruments". Following the contest, The Regal were presented with the award, amidst the applause the crowds and other bands taking part.

Van Morrison, would write songs about his time growing up in Bloomfield, and would describe his time playing saxophone with Cassidy, such as in his 1982 song "Cleaning Windows"

== Personal life ==
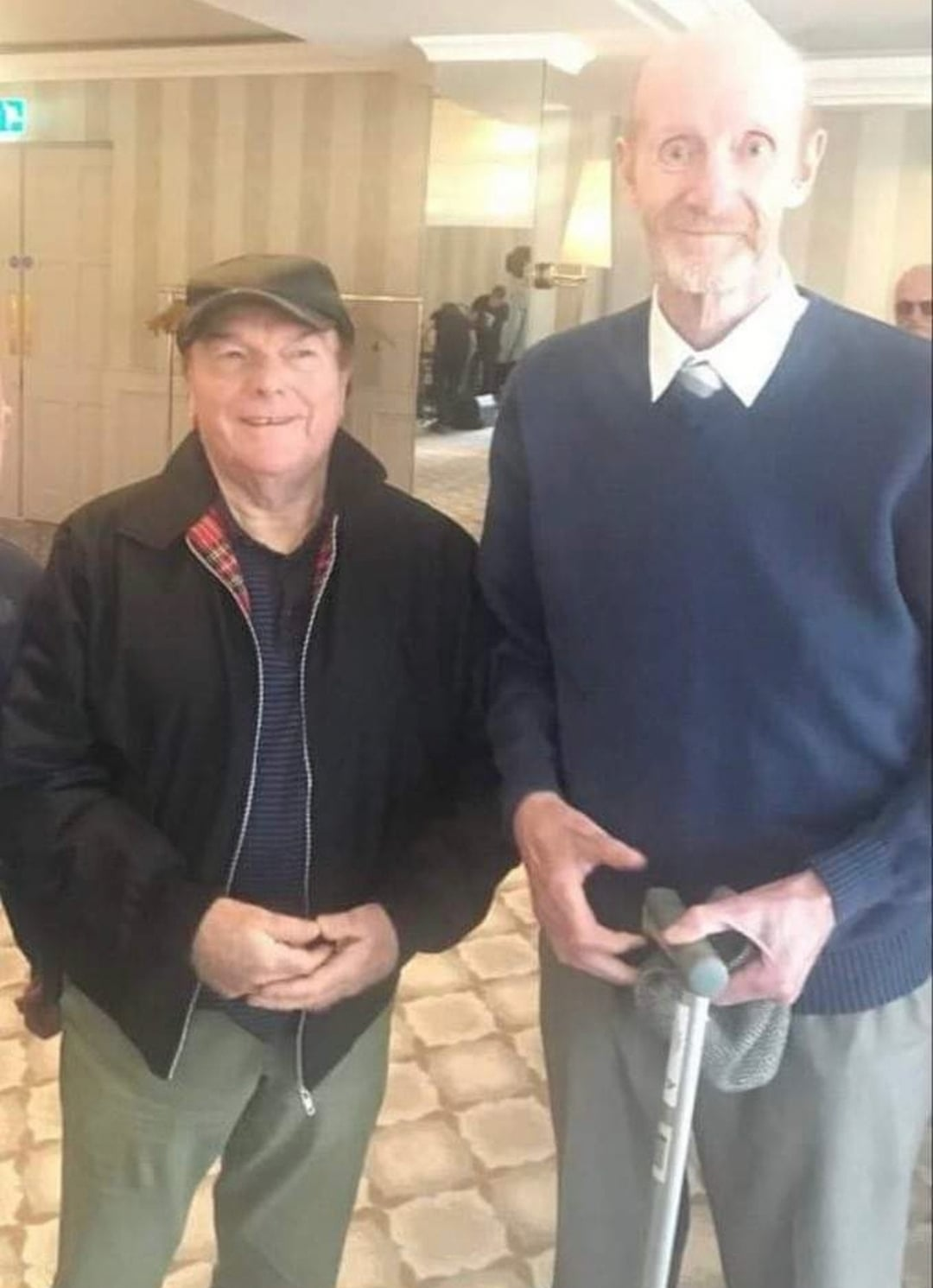
Van Morrison and George Cassidy, Van Morrison's birthday, August 2020.

George Cassidy grew up on Hyndford Street, he had a brother, William. He married his wife, Joan McCommiskey and moved to Dundonald, and had three daughters. They resided in Ballybeen for a short period before purchasing a house in Ardcarn. George Cassidy worked for John Kelly Limited at Queen's Quay, Belfast. Cassidy enjoyed Horse Racing, and frequented the Canberra Bar, Monico and The Raven Social Club. He was a supporter of the Progressive Unionist Party and became friends with David Ervine, who attended the same members club. His favourite drinks were Guinness and demerara rum.

George Cassidy's grandfather, William John Cassidy, was a trimmer on the RMS Titanic., before disembarking in Southampton

Cassidy was a freemason and a member of Unite the Union. Prior to Unite, Cassidy was a member of the Transport and General Workers' Union, and fought to keep Kingsberry Coal open in Belfast.

George Cassidy was born into an Ulster Protestant family. He joined the Apprentice Boys of Derry, followed by the Orange Order.

Cassidy died on 28 May 2023, in the Ulster Hospital from complications of COVID-19 pneumonia. His favourite song "If I Never Sing Another Song" was played at his funeral, 7 June. He is buried at Roselawn Cemetery.
