= Agnes White =

Agnes White may refer to:

- Agnes Ward White, first lady of West Virginia
- Agnes Romilly White, Irish novelist
