= Anne Crone =

Irish novelist and teacher (1915-1972)

- Born: 16 September 1915; Dublin, Ireland
- Died: 25 October 1972 (aged 57); Belfast, Northern Ireland
- Occupations: novelist and teacher

Anne Crone (16 September 1915 – 25 October 1972) was an Irish novelist and teacher.

== Biography ==
Anne Crone was born in Dublin on 16 September 1915. She was the daughter of a Belfast-born civil servant, William Crone, and Mary Jane "Mollie" Crone (née Plunkett) of County Fermanagh. William Crone served as assistant secretary in the Northern Ireland ministry of commerce. She spent some of her early childhood in London, and later attended Methodist College, Belfast, and Somerville College, Oxford. She graduated with a first class BA in French and German in 1936, and a B.Litt. in 1940. She taught for a number of years at Victoria College, Belfast, moving to the Princess Gardens School in 1948 going on to become head of the department of modern languages.

Crone's first novel, Bridie Steen, which was first published in America in 1948, focused on themes of sectarian prejudice in rural Ulster. She examined themes of class and sectarian divisions within Ireland in her subsequent books: This pleasant lea (1951) and My heart and I (1955). Among fans of her work was Lord Dunsany, who wrote the preface to the 1949 English edition of Bridie Steen.

She suffered severely with asthma throughout her life. She died on 25 October 1972 at her home on the King's Road, Belfast. She is buried Dundonald Cemetery, County Down.
