= Senninger Irrigation =

Senninger Irrigation Inc.
- Company type: Private
- Industry: Manufacturing
- Founded: 1963
- Headquarters: Clermont, Florida, USA
- Key people: Steve Abernethy, President; Mark Healy, Vice President and Founder
- Products: Over 200 Irrigation Products
- Number of employees: 200
- Parent: Hunter Industries
- Website: senninger.com

Senninger Irrigation is a wholly owned subsidiary of Hunter Industries and manufacturer of irrigation products and services, based in Clermont, Florida, United States.

== History ==
Senninger Irrigation was founded in 1963 by Joe Senninger, a retired engineer and citrus grower living in Central Florida. The company was founded after Senninger created the first “insect-proof” sprinkler that would prevent mud dauber wasps from nesting in the nozzle orifices of overhead sprinklers when an irrigation system was not in operation. The wasps would clog sprinklers and impede water flow, causing difficulties for citrus farmers in the area.

Senninger designed and introduced many irrigation industry's innovations: high quality in-line pressure regulator (1966); color-coded nozzles for easy size identification (1970); pioneered the use of plastic sprinklers on center pivots (1971); Wobbler® Technology (1978); sprays with interchangeable deflector pads (1980); Hydro software to configure placement of nozzle sizes (1980); a four-mode LEPA (Low Energy Precision Application) Quad Spray (1986); the integral weight concept (1999); double goosenecks and truss rod hose slings (2002).

The company opened warehouses in Lubbock, Texas (1978), and Grand Island, Nebraska (1979), as well as a division in the state of São Paulo, Brazil (2003).

On January 4, 2016, Senninger Irrigation was acquired by its business partner of 12 years, California-based Hunter Industries.

== Products ==
Senninger develops water- and energy-efficient sprinklers, spray nozzles, pressure regulators, and other irrigation tools for agriculture, dairy, mining, effluent, and wastewater applications. It specializes in low-pressure irrigation products designed to help growers use less water and energy, and increase irrigation uniformity by spreading water in a pattern that resists wind distortion and evaporation at high temperatures.
