= Belfast City Bruins =

Irish ice hockey team

- Founded: 2007
- League: Irish Ice Hockey League
- Based in: Belfast, Northern Ireland
- Location: Northern Ireland
- Colours: Black, Yellow, White
- Head coach: Gordon Ferguson

The Belfast City Bruins were an ice hockey team in the Irish Ice Hockey League. They were coached by Gordon Ferguson.

== History ==
The Belfast Bruins were established in February 2007 to compete in the Irish Ice Hockey League where they finished 4th, representing Belfast. They are distinct from the Belfast Giants, who play in the British Elite League. Notably, players like Johnson, Stewart, Martin, and Hamill transferred from the Giants to the Bruins when the league was formed. The Bruins' logo is inspired by the NHL's Boston Bruins, though the team does not have any developmental ties to the Boston Bruins farm system. Their last media post was in 2019 with limited news coming from the team in the years prior.

== Games record ==
=== Games summary ===
Season	League	Games	Wins	Points	Position
2008	Irish Ice Hockey League	14	2	12	4th
