= Dundonald, County Down =

Town on outskirts of Belfast, Northern Ireland

Coordinates: 54.594°N 5.813°W

Dundonald: Irish: Dún Dónaill; Scots: Dundonal or Dundoanal
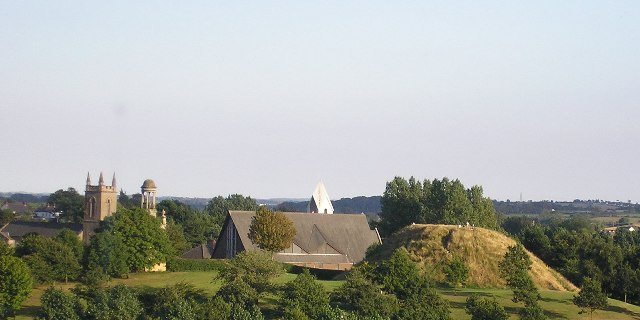
- Dundonald Moat and St Elizabeth's Church

- Location within County Down
- Population: 15,365 (2011 census)
- District: Lisburn and Castlereagh
- County: County Down
- Country: Northern Ireland
- Sovereign state: United Kingdom
- Post town: BELFAST
- Postcode district: BT16
- Dialling code: 028
- UK Parliament: Belfast East
- NI Assembly: Belfast East

Dundonald (from Irish Dún Dónaill, meaning 'Donald's fort') is a large settlement and civil parish in County Down, Northern Ireland. It lies east of Belfast and is a suburb of the city. It is home to Moat Park, the Ulster Hospital, and Dundonald International Ice Bowl.

== History ==
=== Origins ===
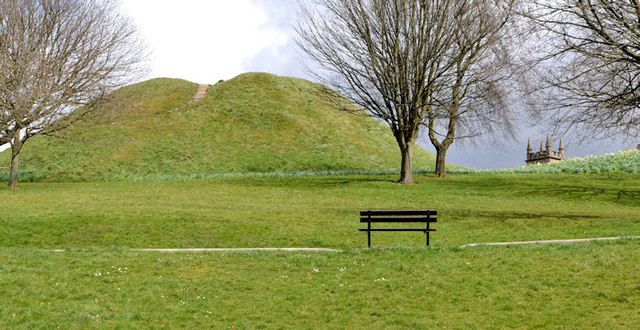
The Moat, Dundonald

The name Dundonald is first recorded as Dundouenald (c. 1183) and later as Dundonnell. It comes from Irish Dún Dónaill, meaning "Donald's fort". While the ruined fort currently visible is of Norman origin, the Gaelic name suggests that it may have been the site of a pre-Norman stronghold belonging to a local chieftain named Dónall.

In 1177, the Anglo-Norman knight John de Courcy invaded eastern Ulster and created the Earldom of Ulster. To secure his new territory, he built a network of motte-and-bailey castles, including one at Dundonald. It was a strategic choice for a fort, as it sat on the main inland route linking de Courcy's headquarters at Carrickfergus Castle with his southern stronghold at Dundrum Castle. A wooden tower was built atop a man-made hill (the motte), and a church and settlement was built at the base (the bailey), marking the beginning of the Church Quarter. De Courcy signed a charter mentioning Richard de Dundoenald, who was named Lord of the Manor and is credited with establishing Dundonald as a Norman settlement.

Today, the site is known as Moat Park, with "moat" being a corruption of the word "motte". Dundonald motte is one of the largest surviving examples in Ireland.

Dundonald developed around the medieval parish church. The parish was one of the oldest ecclesiastical sites in eastern County Down.

In July 1210, King John of England arrived in Ulster to rein in the de Lacys, as they had become too independent of the English Crown. The king used Dundonald fort as a Royal residence. A record from this visit remains in the Royal "Prest" (payment) accounts: while staying at Dundonald, King John reportedly lost 2 pence while playing a game of cards with the Earl of Winchester.

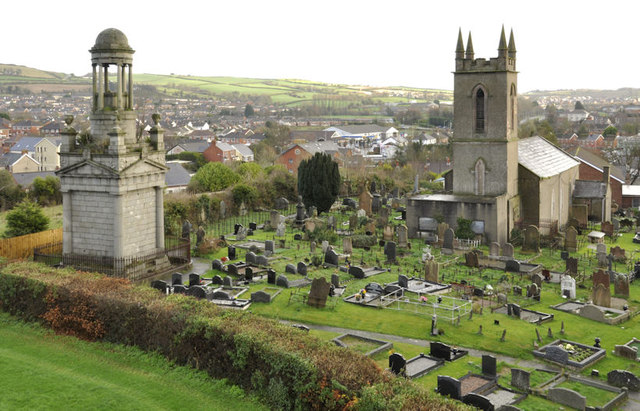
St Elizabeth's Church and the Cleland Mausoleum

=== Railway era (1850–1950) ===
Dundonald acquired rail links to Belfast and Newtownards in 1850, Downpatrick in 1859 and Newcastle in 1869. The town was located on the once extensive Belfast and County Down Railway mainline. The rail link with Belfast encouraged Dundonald to expand as a commuter town, but in 1950, the railway line running through Dundonald was closed. Dundonald railway station was opened on 6 May 1850, but finally closed on 24 April 1950.

The old railway line has now been converted to the Comber Greenway, a pedestrian and cycle path running from East Belfast, through Dundonald to Comber.

In 1877, the Dundonald Purple Vine Orange Lodge was established, taking on the warrant of LOL 1056.

=== 20th century ===
The Independent Orange Order, constituted in June 1903, held its first ever parade that same year. Dundonald was selected as the host town. It was attended by around 500 members.

==== Landowners ====
The Robbs were tenant farmers who went on to own a vast majority of the land in Dundonald. The family originally arrived from Scotland during the Plantation of Ulster, arriving in the Dundonald area around 1700. The farmland is now Ballybeen Housing Estate, which was built in the 1960s when the Robbs sold around 220 to 250 acres of this land in Ballybeen to the Northern Ireland Housing Trust. This changed Dundonald from a rural farming village into a town. Robbs Road, a main road today, was once a private lane to the farm. The Castlereagh Council named the road after the family.

Ballybeen House was the Robbs family seat, an elegant country house located where Ballybeen Square is today. The family home was eventually used as offices by the Northern Ireland Housing Executive. It was demolished in the late 1980s. Today, only a few old trees and the layout of certain paths hint at where the grand gardens once were.

The Cleland family were also landowners in Dundonald. St. Elizabeth's Church is located beside the moat, with the Cleland Mausoleum in the adjacent graveyard. The mausoleum was built for Samuel Jackson Cleland, by his wife, Eliza Cleland.

==== Arnold Schwarzenegger visit ====
In 1966, following a bodybuilding competition, judge Ivan Dunbar invited Arnold Schwarzenegger to Belfast for a bodybuilding exhibition at the Ulster Hall. Arnold stayed at the Dunbar family home in Wanstead, Dundonald, where he was served a traditional Ulster fry. Schwarzenegger credited Dunbar with helping him overcome a fear of public speaking. In March 2026, Schwarzenegger returned to the Belfast area to receive an honorary doctorate from Ulster University, where he publicly reminisced about his 1966 stay in Dundonald as the catalyst for his international career and reunited with local residents from his initial visit.

==== Growth ====
In the 1960s, Dundonald was deemed a small village. In the late 20th century, Dundonald saw a spike increase in housing developments, given its proximity to Belfast, Bangor, Stormont and Ballyhackamore.

== Demography ==
For census purposes, Dundonald is no longer treated as a separate entity by the NI Statistics and Research Agency (NISRA). Instead, it is combined with a large part of east and southeast Belfast to form the "Castlereagh Urban Area".

At the 2011 census, Dundonald's population was 15,365.

Of this population:

- 75.1% were Protestant or from a Protestant background
- 4.7% were Catholic or from a Catholic background
- 19.1% were of other religious backgrounds or no religious background.

== Governance ==
Dundonald is represented in council governance by the Castlereagh East DEA. The members elected in 2023 were:

Name	Party
Martin Gregg	Alliance
Sharon Skillen	DUP
Sharon Lowry	Alliance
Samantha Burns	DUP
Hazel Legge	UUP
John Laverty	DUP

== Townlands ==
Dundonald is within the small parish of the same name. Like the rest of the island of Ireland, this parish has long been divided into townlands. These gave their names to roads and housing estates. The following is a list of townlands within Dundonald's urban area, with their likely etymologies:

- Ballybeen (from Irish Baile Bín 'Bean's townland')
- Ballylisbredan (from Baile Lios Bradáin, 'townland of Bradán's fort') – includes Millmount Village
- Ballymaglaff (from Baile Mhig Laithimh, 'McGlave's townland')
- Ballymiscaw (historically Ballisnesca, from Baile Lios na Scáth, 'townland of the fort of spectres') – includes most of the Stormont Estate
- Ballyoran (from Baile Fhuaráin, 'townland of the well or spring')
- Ballyregan (from Baile Uí Riagáin, 'O'Regan's townland')
- Carrowreagh (from An Cheathrú Riabhach, 'the grey or speckled quarter')
- Church Quarter – site of the Norman motte and St Elizabeth's Church
- Dunlady (from Dún Léide, 'Léide's fort')

== Places of interest ==
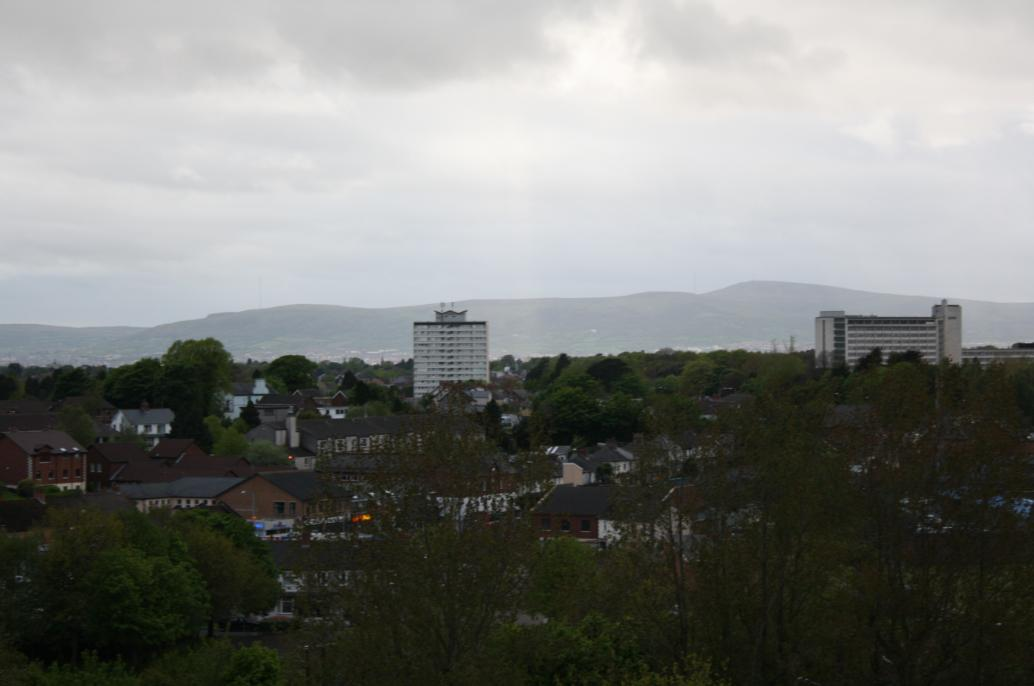
Aerial view of Dundonald from the Moat Hill

=== Parks and heritage ===
Moat Park is a large public park, which contains football pitches, basketball court, outdoor gym and a playpark. The Moat Park's key feature is a historic motte-and-bailey, known as the Moat Hill, which contains panoramic views of the town. It is accessible via steps that were installed in the 1960s. A pavilion also lies in the grounds, which is used for band practice and community events.

The Comber Greenway is a direct traffic-free link into Belfast, following the route of the former Belfast and County Down Railway's Dundonald railway station, passing through Dundonald. It is used by thousands of cyclists and walkers on a daily basis.

Billy Neill Country Park and the Soccer Centre of Excellence, named after Northern Irish footballer Billy Neill, opened in 2001.

There are two cemeteries in Dundonald, St. Elizabeth's and Dundonald Cemetery. The former features the Cleland Mausoleum, which is the tallest mausoleum in Ulster.

The Old Mill, a historic watermill site dating back to 1752, it features a 35-foot water wheel, one of the largest in Ireland, and sandstone building. In August 2025, it was confirmed the site had been restored and has opened to the public.

=== Leisure and Commerce ===
"The Village" is the name given to the area in Dundonald containing a range of shops, including a bakery, barbers, takeaways, charity shop, café and pharmacy.

In 1986, the Dundonald International Ice Bowl was opened in the town. This originally comprised an Olympic-sized ice rink and a 20 lane AMF ten pin bowling alley. In later years, "Indianaland", a children's Aztec themed indoor adventure playground was added along with Laser Quest, a simulated combat arena using laser tag equipment. The bowling alley was upgraded to 30 lanes in the 1990s and an extensive miniature golf course was built. The site also contains a David Lloyd fitness centre. In 2006, the area was designated as the Dundonald Leisure Park, as part of the Draft Belfast Metropolitan Area Plan 2015. In 2008, an Omniplex cinema was built on the opposite side of the Old Dundonald Road, together with several leisure and restaurant units, which later on now became what is now known as the OmniPark.

Dundonald Caravan Park is operated by Lisburn and Castlereagh City Council and is open seasonally from mid-March to the end of October. It is recognised by Automobile Association and Tourism NI, and is graded by the British Graded Holiday Parks Scheme.

=== Bars ===
Dundonald's longest-running public house was originally known as The Central Bar. It later became the Elk Inn after being purchased by the Elkin brothers. Its name changed to Ruby's after being sold in the 2010s. In September 2025, it was renamed to The Crafty Elk.

The Kosy Social Club is a members club serving the Dundonald community. It has live bands, pool tables and a members priced bar.

Previous Dundonald pubs include; Cherryhill Inn, Quarry Inn, Kings Inn and The Old Moat Inn no longer exist, the latter burnt down in 2019.

In February 2025, Lidl won its legal battle to open its first pub, drawing an invest with a minimum of £410,000. In May 2026, it was announced it would open the following month. It is named "The Middle Ale".

=== Public Services ===
The Ulster Hospital is located in Dundonald, known colloquially as "The Ulster".

The Dundonald railway station opened on 6 May 1850. It was located 4 miles from Queen's Quay Station in Belfast. It closed on 4 April 1950. The site was demolished, and reused as a route along the Comber Greenway.

The PSNI Dundonald Police Station faces the Ulster Hospital. It falls under the PSNI Lisburn & Castlereagh City District. The old Dundonald Police Station was located in "the village" area of Dundonald.

Dundonald Park & Ride is the eastern terminus of the Belfast Glider service. The facility has a large car park and a bus station that the glider and feeder buses for Ballybeen and Coopers Mill terminate.

== Sport ==
=== Football ===
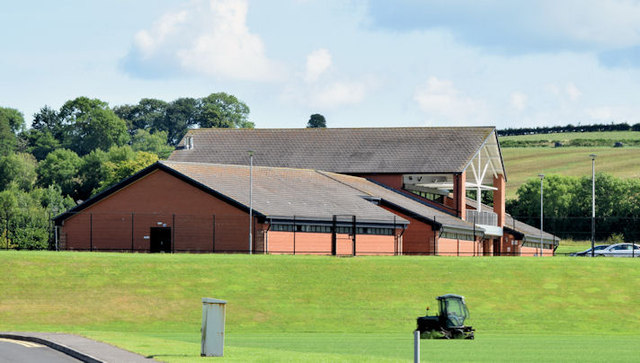
Billy Neill football pavillion

A number of local association football teams play out of Dundonald, Dundonald F.C. play in 1C and 3C of the Northern Amateur Football League. Dundonald Football Club is one of the oldest running amateur league clubs in Northern Ireland, established in 1953. The Duns have won NAFL Division 1B in the 1968-69, 1974-75, 1986-87 and 2009/10 seasons.

Moat Park Rangers, Cooke Athletic and 43RD Old Boys Dundonald play in the Down Area Winter Football League. The 43rd won a cup double in the 2024/25 season, winning Division 2 and the Frank Moore Memorial Cup. The Moat Playing Fields contains a space for The Rangers and other teams to play. Across from the playing fields is a basketball court.

The Geriátricos are an over-35's football team in Dundonald. The name is an adopted nickname of the "galácticos" Real Madrid football team, they use a mock Real Madrid badge and football kit.

Dungoyne F.C. are a youth football club that play on the Belfast Road in Dundonald in the SBYL. They were established in 1976 and are known for its youth coaching and academy for boys and girls. It is recognized as a 'Quality Mark' club by the Irish FA. In 2024, Dungoyne were named one of 450 clubs in the UK to benefit from the £3m project Howdens "Game Changer" Programme, run in partnership with the Irish FA Foundation. They had a new state-of-the-art kitchen built for them.

Former football teams from Dundonald include Donard Hospital F.C., Ulster Hospital F.C., St. Elizabeth's F.C. and Fisher Body F.C.

=== Ards motor racing circuit ===
The Ards Circuit through Dundonald was a motorsport street circuit used for RAC Tourist Trophy sports car races from 1928 until 1936. At the time, it was Northern Ireland's premier sporting event, regularly attracting crowds in excess of a quarter of a million people.

The pits at Dundonald were still visible until the 1960s. A popular viewing point for the Dundonald Hairpin Bend was the Central Bar (now the Crafty Elk) in Dundonald.

=== Ice sports ===
Established in 1986, the Dundonald International Ice Bowl, the ice rink is the only Olympic-sized ice rink on the island of Ireland. The facility is currently being redeveloped into a state-of-the-art entertainment hub while maintaining its existing services, including ice sports, bowling, and fitness. Notably, it serves as the official practice base for the Belfast Giants professional ice hockey team, supporting both elite performance and grassroots development in the region.

Dundonald Ice Bowl is home to the Irish Ice Hockey League's Junior Belfast Giants. Local amateur teams, Belfast City Rockets, Castlereagh Spartans, Castlereagh Vixens, and Prowlers also play their games at the Dundonald Ice Bowl.

Dundonald is the home of Glenburn Figure Skating Club and several local curling initiatives, as it is the only viable venue for these sports to take place.

=== Golf ===
Knock Golf Club is located on the Upper Newtownards Road, facing Dundonald Cemetery.

Castlereagh Hills Golf Club is a 18-hole parkland course in the Castlereagh Hills.

=== Boxing ===
Former professional boxer John Lowey was born and raised in the Ballybeen area of Dundonald. Nicknamed "The Quiet Man", Lowey represented Ireland at the 1988 Summer Olympics in Seoul, competing in the bantamweight division where he won his first two bouts before being eliminated in the round of 16. In 1995, Lowey won the IBO Super-bantamweight title in Chicago, USA when he beat Juan Camero via a 5th round stoppage.

=== Martial arts ===
Simply Judo's Dundonald branch is located in the Enler Centre, Ballybeen, and is Northern Ireland's largest and most successful judo club.

RAPTR Martial Arts is a mixed martial arts club located in Inspire Business Park in Carrowreagh. They teach jujitsu, Muay Thai, kickboxing, savate, grappling and arnis. Local competitors have competed in the British Junior Savate Championships and won gold.

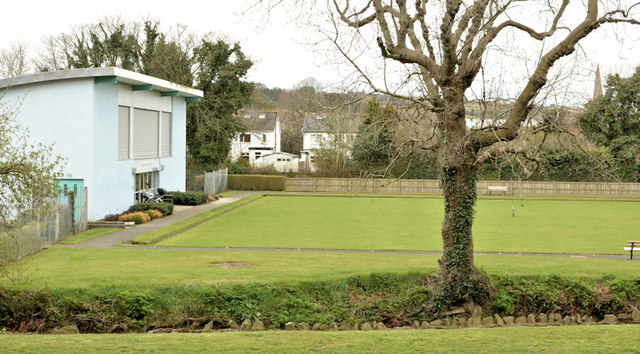
Moat Park pavillion and bowling green

=== Bowls ===
Dundonald Bowling Club is one of the oldest sports teams in Dundonald It is a lawn bowls club located at the pavilion in Moat Park. They are governed by the Northern Ireland Bowling Association.

=== Gyms ===
There are a number of gyms and fitness centers in Dundonald, including Invictus Gymnasium in Carrowreagh, Vitality Gym at the Billy Neill centre, David Lloyd centre on the Old Dundonald Road, Evolv Fitness NI in Church Quarter, and Urban Fitness on the Carrowreagh Road.

==== Bodybuilding ====
NABBA International bodybuilding judge Ivan Dunbar grew up in Dundonald. He brought Arnold Schwarzenegger to his home in Wanstead, Dundonald when he asked invited him for a bodybuilding show in Belfast. Dunbar also owned a gym on the Newtownards Road.

=== Other sports ===
The Moat Park features sports pitches and a basketball court.

== Culture ==
The Dundonald Arts Club is a well-established group that holds regular meetings, talks, and an annual exhibition for local artists.

=== Loyal Orders ===
Sir Daniel Dixon Bart Orange Hall, also known as Dundonald Orange Hall, has been used by the Dundonald Loyal Orders since 1924.

==== Orange Order ====
The Dundonald Purple Vine Loyal Orange Lodge 1056 is an Orange Lodge on the Comber Road. They are a part of the Holywood District No. 14. They organized the district's Twelfth of July demonstration in 2025, the first it had been held in Dundonald since 1967.

The Dundonald Purple Vine holds an annual lodge parade in January.

Dundonald True Blues Loyal Orange Lodge 1111 is another historic Orange Lodge.

Rising Sons of Dundonald JLOL 172 is a junior Orange Lodge in Dundonald under the North Down Junior District and County Down Junior LOL.

==== Apprentice Boys ====
Dundonald Browning Club is a local branch of the Apprentice Boys of Derry. In June, the branch holds an annual march from Dundonald Orange Hall to the Cross of Reflection in Dundonald Cemetery. This service is held to remember those who died in the Battle of the Somme. They also partake in the Relief of Derry and Closing of the Gates parades in Derry.

==== Royal Black Institution ====
Dundonald Royal Black Preceptory 482 is the local branch of the Royal Black Institution. Their meetings take place at Dundonald Orange Hall. They partake in the "Last Saturday in August" also known as the Royal Black parade.

In 2026, Dundonald was chosen to host the Belfast Black Saturday parade.

=== Music ===
"The Old Dundonald Road" is a song written by Tony Corrigan, about growing up in Dundonald.

In the 1960s into the 1980s, the Metro became a prominent music venue in Dundonald. It hosted a variety of acts, including local bands and internationally recognised musicians, such as Roy Orbison and John Mayall. It has since closed, the location was bought by McDonald's. The Dundonald Ice Bowl has also been used as a music venue, talent included Bob Dylan and The Everly Brothers in 1991, and The Prodigy, in 1992.

==== Marching Bands ====
The Symington Memorial Silver Band is a marching band Dundonald. They are a prominent community music group founded in 1898 by Robert Symington, a local linen merchant, as a way to provide a constructive activity for young boys and teenagers in the area. Initially, it was a flute band and part of a Boys' Brigade company, known as the Brigade Band. They march on a regular basis, including the Black Parade and The Twelfth of July.

The Pride of Ballybeen Community Flute Band, originates in the Ballybeen estate, and also participate in unionist parades, including the Belfast Twelfth and Battle of the Somme Memorial Parade.

A disbanded historic marching band in Dundonald was the Ballybeen Defenders. It was renamed to Kingsley Kennedy in honour of a band member that was killed in an accident in the early 1970s. It was renamed to Kennedy-Craig Memorial after member Andy Craig was shot dead by the IRA on 8 September 1975. A plaque commemorating Craig was erected in Ballybeen.

Former band Dundonald Rangers Accordion Band would changed to Dundonald Rangers Flute Band.

The defunct Dundonald Star Flute Band was active as early as the 1900's. In 1904, Dundonald Star visited MP James Wood's farm in Mount Salem, situated between Dundonald and Combers in the hills on the Ballyrussell Road to perform.

== Education ==
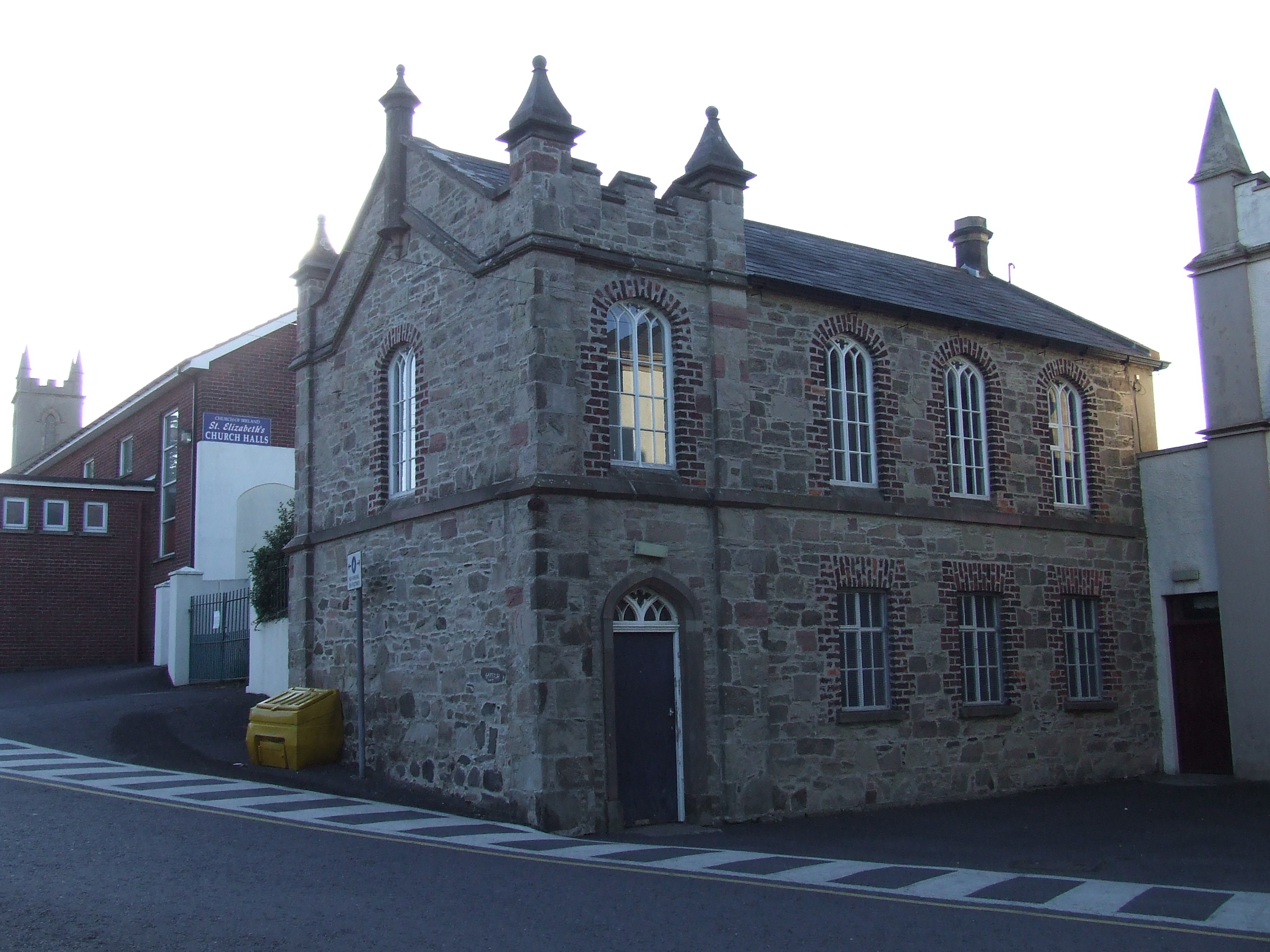
Former National School

Dundonald has two primary schools, Dundonald Primary School and Brooklands Primary School. The local secondary school is Dundonald High School. Dundonald also has two schools for those with special needs and learning difficulties: Tor Bank and Longstone Special School.

== Notable people ==
- Steven Agnew, politician
- George Best, footballer
- Noel Brotherston, footballer
- Vivian Campbell, Def Leppard guitarist
- George Cassidy, jazz musician
- Glenn Ferguson, Linfield footballer
- Gemma Garrett, model, former Miss Great Britain and Miss Belfast
- Anne Gregg, BBC presenter and travel writer
- Davy Larmour, Crusaders footballer
- John Lowey, boxer
- Barry McClements, Commonwealth Games para swimming medallist
- Micky Modelle, DJ
- Michael Moore, UK politician, born in town
- Colin Murray, BBC Radio 1 DJ
- Iris Robinson, politician
- Chris Walker, Glentoran footballer
- Paddy Wallace, Rugby union footballer
- Agnes Romilly White, writer

== Civil parish of Dundonald ==
The civil parish contains the settlement of Dundonald. It also contains the following townlands:

- Ballybeen
- Ballylisbredan
- Ballymiscaw
- Ballyoran
- Ballyrainey
- Ballyregan
- Carrowreagh
- Castlebeg
- Church Quarter
- Dunlady
- Killeen
- Unicarval

== See also ==
- List of civil parishes of County Down
- Dundonald Cemetery
