= St. Elizabeth's F.C. =

Association football club in Northern Ireland

St. Elizabeth's Football Club
- Nickname: "The Hatchet Men"
- Ground: Billy Neill Centre, Dundonald
- Manager: Robert McGimpsey
- League: Northern Amateur Football League

St. Elizabeth's F.C. was an amateur association football club who were based in Dundonald, County Down, Northern Ireland and played in the Northern Amateur Football League. The football club was named after St. Elizabeth's Church in the town of Dundonald.

St. Elizabeth's player, Robert McGimpsey went on to manage the club and was thereafter appointed club honorary secretary in the 1960s. The biggest St. Elizabeth's victory was winning the Division 1A in 1965.

== List of St. Elizabeth's F.C. players ==
- Alec Dempster
- Jim Close
- Brian Robinson
- Walter McCallum
- William Robinson
- E Massey
- D Kane
- R Shields
- T McConnell
- C Wilson
- S Orderly
- J Conkey
- J Thompson
- B Mackie
- E Bowman
- Jack Dundas
- Trevor Marshall
- Robbie Duncan
- Mark "Chalky" White
- Alan "Skinny" Little
- Neil Hewitt
- Bobby Anderson
- Trevor Hollinger
- Craig Brotherston
- Maurice "Mo" Anderson
- Steven Kelly
- Garry McKeown
- Billy Bailie
- Robert McGimsey
- Herbie Barr

== Honours ==
Northern Amateur Football League

- Division 1A
  - 1964-65
  - Runners-up: 1962-63
- Division 2A
  - 1954–55
  - Runners-up: 1947-48
- Division 2B
  - 1951-52
- 2nd Division
  - 1944-45
- Clarence Cup
  - 1965-66
- Border Cup
  - Runners-up: 1961-62, 1965-66

== See also ==
- List of association football clubs in Northern Ireland
- Donard Hospital F.C.
- Dundonald F.C.
