= Hunter Industries =

Private American manufacturing company

Hunter Industries, Inc.
- Type: Private corporation
- Industry: Landscape and lighting
- Genre: Manufacturing
- Predecessor: Richard E. Hunter
- Founded: 1981
- Founder: Edwin J. Hunter; Paul M. Hunter
- Headquarters: San Marcos, California, United States
- Number of locations: San Marcos, California, Tijuana, Mexico
- Area served: Irrigation; Landscape lighting; Customer manufacturing
- Key people: Greg Hunter, President & CEO; James Burks, President of Senninger Irrigation; Arne Pike, President of Dispensing Dynamics International
- Products: Irrigation equipment; Landscape lighting
- Number of employees: 1,500+
- Subsidiaries: Dispensing Dynamics International; FX Luminaire; Holm; Hunter Custom Manufacturing; Senninger Irrigation
- Website: www.hunterindustries.com

Hunter Industries is a manufacturer of irrigation and outdoor lighting equipment for the landscaping, residential, commercial, agricultural, and golf course industries, based in San Marcos, California. Hunter Industries also offers sanitary dispensing products such as automatic paper towel and soap dispensers. It is the second largest employer in San Marcos after the San Marcos Unified School District.

== History ==
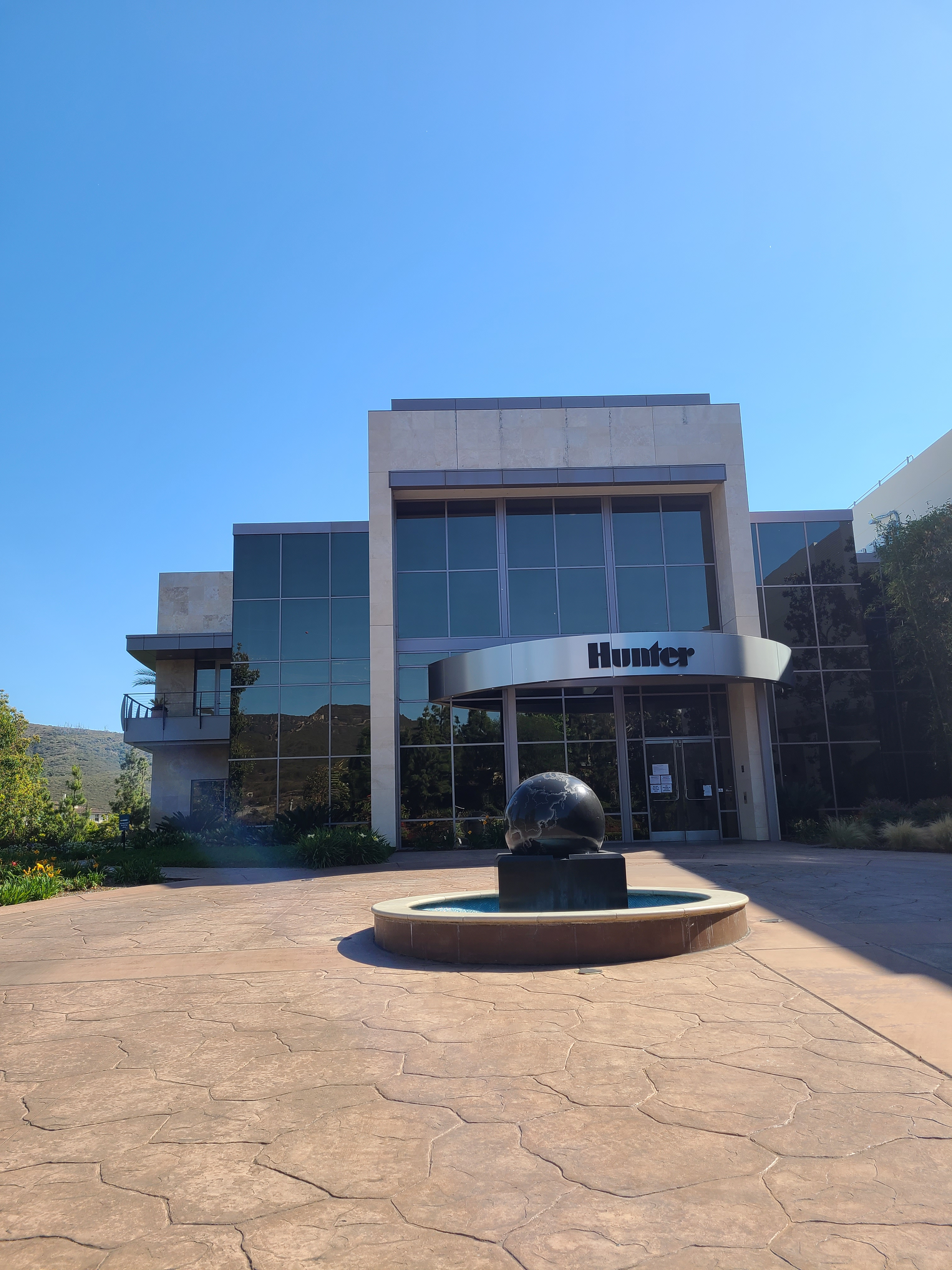
Hunter Industries headquarters in San Marcos California

Hunter produces pop-up gear-driven rotors, spray sprinklers, valves, controllers, central controllers, and weather sensors. The company reports that it holds more than 250 product patents and 40 trademarks, and conducts business in 125 countries. The company was founded in 1981 by Edwin J. Hunter and Paul M. Hunter, to produce a compact landscape sprinkler called the "PGP" (an acronym meaning "professional gear-driven pop-up"), the first sprinkler to utilize "matched-precipitation" regardless of the radii or arc. After being President and CEO for 19 years, Edwin Hunter retired in February 2013 and was succeeded by his son, Richard E. Hunter.

The company's irrigation and landscape lighting products are used in a wide array of locations including sports stadiums, national landmarks, hotels, and city parks. Manufacturing facilities are located in San Marcos, California, and Tijuana, Mexico, and the company also has overseas offices in China. An additional plant had been in operation in Cary, NC, from 1992 to 2009, but the plant was closed due to poor market conditions at the time.

In 2016, the Center for Executive Excellence (CEE) recognized Hunter Industries as one of twelve companies that excelled in promoting a successful business culture.

== Acquisitions ==
On August 13, 2019, Hunter Industries acquired Lumascape, an Australian company that specializes in architectural lighting, facade lighting, and high-output applications.

On 16 June 2017, Hunter Industries acquired Dispensing Dynamics International from Kinderhook Industries. This acquisition marks Hunter Industries' first major foray into a market unrelated to irrigation or landscape products.

In May 2016, Hunter Industries acquired Hydrawise, a manufacturer of Wi-Fi-based irrigation controllers and web-based software.

On January 4, 2016, Hunter Industries acquired Florida-based Senninger Irrigation. The two companies have been strategic partners since 2004. On June 24, 2015 the firm acquired all landscape irrigation products, patents, and trademarks from Alex-Tronix Controls.

In 2009, Hunter acquired landscape lighting company FX Luminaire,

In 2008, Hunter acquired custom molding company Grizzle & Hunter Plastics LLC., now re-branded as Hunter Custom Manufacturing.

In 2007, Hunter acquired the MP Rotator product line from Walla Walla Sprinkler company through an agreement with Nelson Irrigation Corporation.

In 1999, Hunter acquired the Legacy Golf irrigation product line from Buckner Incorporated.

== Brands ==
Hunter industries has several corporate brands offering products for specific needs:

Hunter Brand - Residential, commercial and golf irrigation

Senninger - Agricultural and mining irrigation

FX Luminaire - Landscape and architectural lighting products for consumers, with a focus on LED lighting

Holm - Landscape and architectural lighting products for commercial and industrial use

Lumascape - Custom exterior architectural, landscape and underwater lighting

Dispensing Dynamics - Dispensers for towel, tissue, wiper, napkin, soap and air care products

Hunter Custom Manufacturing - molding and manufacturing services for customers

== Conservation ==
As part of the increased focus on environmental sustainability in the irrigation industry, Hunter Industries has rolled out new and more eco-friendly sprinklers, including the MP800SR Rotator (short range) and new dripline and subsurface irrigation offerings such as the eco-mat.

== Arson ==
On October 26, 2003, an arson fire damaged the main manufacturing plant in San Marcos, causing US$17 million in damages. Fires had been started in 8 locations of the building using accelerants, most likely by a disgruntled employee or ex-employee, causing damage to inventory and production areas. As of 2006, no one had been prosecuted for the crime, but the fire provided the company the opportunity to modernize and to expand its operations. At the October 2006 reopening, CEO Richard Hunter announced, "Today is a celebration of total recovery from an event that easily could have destroyed our company…instead it made us bigger, better, stronger."
