= Irish Ice Hockey Association =

Governing body for ice hockey in Ireland

Ireland
- Association name: Irish Ice Hockey Association
- IIHF Code: IRL
- IIHF membership: 26 September 1996
- President: Aaron Guli
- IIHF men's ranking: N/A
- IIHF women's ranking: N/A

The Irish Ice Hockey Association (IIHA) is the governing body of ice hockey for Ireland.

The association was established in 1996. A not-for-profit organisation, the IIHA is a member of Sport Ireland, the International Ice Hockey Federation (IIHF), the Federation of Irish Sport (FIS), and the Olympic Federation of Ireland (OFI). The IIHA was accepted as a member of Sport Ireland in 2016, and worked with the National Governing Body office over the course of a 2-year probationary period. The IIHA was recognised as a national governing body for ice hockey, by Sport Ireland, in September 2018.

The IIHA ran the Irish Ice Hockey League from 2007 until 2010.

== Clubs ==
As of 2025, the following clubs are associated with the Irish Ice Hockey Association:

- Flying Ducks
- Dublin Buccaneers
- Kilkenny Storm
- Cork Wolfpack
- Sirens IHC
- Castlereagh Capybaras
- Belfast Spartans
- Belfast Renegades
- Wild Hawks
- Belfast Foxes
- Falcons IHC

== See also ==
- Ireland men's national ice hockey team
- Ireland women's national ice hockey team
