= Latvian Hawks =

Latvian Hawks
Founded	2007
Home ice	Dundalk Ice Dome (1,500)
Based in	Dundalk, Ireland
Colors
League	Irish Ice Hockey League
Head coach	Aigars Brencis
Manager	Aigars Brencis & Guntars Bleikss
Affiliate(s)	Latvian Hawks "B" (IIHL Developmental Division)

The Latvian Hawks were an ice hockey team based in Dundalk, Ireland. They played all of their games in the Dundalk Ice Dome in Dundalk. They last competed in the Irish Ice Hockey League. The team's name was a homage to the large contingent of Latvian expatriates who settled in Ireland. They became the Charlestown Chiefs for the 2009-10 season.

== Awards and Championships ==
- 2007 St. Patrick's Cup Champions.
