= Irish Ice Hockey League =

Highest league tier of ice hockey in Ireland

- The first official Irish Ice Hockey League.
- Sport: Ice hockey
- Founded: 2007
- Folded: 2010
- Countries: Ireland; Northern Ireland
- Website: Irish Ice Hockey Association

The Irish Ice Hockey League, which ran from 2007 to 2010, was the highest league tier of ice hockey in Ireland. While amateur leagues had existed since the early 1980s, the league was founded in 2007/2008 by the Irish Ice Hockey Association (IIHA). The league collapsed in 2010 following the closure of the Dundalk Ice Dome.

== History ==
Following on from the construction of Dundalk Ice Dome and the success of the Division 3 Ice Hockey World Championship held in Dundalk during April 2007, the IIHA announced the formation of an all new, all-Ireland Ice Hockey League. At that time, the five teams in the league played all of their regular season games at the Dundalk Ice Dome. The league's inaugural champions were the Dundalk Bulls who won the 2007–08 title by defeating the Dublin Rams 6-3.

The league collapsed during the 2009-2010 season, with the closure of the Dundalk Ice Dome. The league is now played under the Irish Ice Hockey Association at an amateur level.

== List of teams ==
Former clubs, previously involved in the Irish Ice Hockey league, included:

- Belfast City Bruins
- Belfast Giants
- Dublin Rams
- Dundalk Bulls
- Junior Belfast Giants
- Latvian Hawks

== Seasons ==
=== 2007–08 ===
The 2007–08 season' was the first season of the Irish Ice Hockey League. Five teams participated in the league, and the Dundalk Bulls won the championship.

Standings

	Club	GP	W	L	SOW	SOL	GF–GA	Pts
1.	Dundalk Bulls	15	14	1	0	0	192:34	42
2.	Dublin Rams	16	11	4	0	1	99:96	34
3.	Flyers IHC	16	7	8	1	0	80:146	23
4.	Belfast City Bruins	14	4	10	0	0	65:107	12
5.	Latvian Hawks	14	1	13	0	0	55:112	3

Playoffs

- Semifinals
  - Dundalk Bulls 26 - Latvian Hawks 4
  - Dublin Rams 4 - Flyers IHC 1
- Final: Dundalk Bulls 6 - Dublin Rams 3

=== 2008–09 ===
The 2008–09 season was the second season of the Irish Ice Hockey League. Six teams participated in the league, and the Dundalk Bulls won the championship.

Regular season

	Club	GP	W	L	T	GF–GA	Pts
1.	Dublin Rams	15	9	6	0	88:56	33
2.	Dundalk Bulls	11	10	0	1	113:16	32
3.	Latvian Hawks	12	9	2	1	101:37	30
4.	Belfast Giants	13	4	9	0	55:119	20
5.	Dublin Wolves	11	3	8	0	40:100	16
6.	Flyers IHC	12	1	11	0	28:97	1

Playoffs The league was cancelled mid-season, and the Dundalk Bulls were named champions.

=== 2009–10 ===
The 2009–10 season was the third season of the Irish Ice Hockey League. Five teams participated, but season was abandoned partway through, and the Charlestown Chiefs were declared champions.

Regular season

	Club	GP	GF–GA	Pts
1.	Charlestown Chiefs	6	67:14	15
2.	Dundalk Bulls	6	54:23	14
3.	Flyers IHC	4	14:25	3
4.	Dublin Rams	4	10:39	3
5.	CastleReigh Spartans	4	9-54	0
