= Billy Neill =

Northern Ireland footballer and manager

Personal information
- Full name: William Neill
- Date of birth: 1929
- Place of birth: Belfast, Northern Ireland
- Date of death: 28 October 1997
- Place of death: Belfast, Northern Ireland
- Position: Right half

Youth career
- 1947–1950: Glentoran

Senior career*
Years	Team	Apps	(Gls)
1950–1963	Glentoran		

International career
1952–1959	Irish League XI	14	(0)

Managerial career
- 1965–1966: Glentoran
- 1968: Glentoran
- 1968: Glentoran (co-manager)
- * Club domestic league appearances and goals

William Neill MBE (1929 – 28 October 1997) was a Northern Irish footballer who played in the Irish League with Glentoran from 1950 to 1963. With the Glens, he won the Irish League championship in 1952–53, the Gold Cup twice, the City Cup and the Ulster Cup once each. He was capped fourteen times by the Irish League XI between 1952 and 1959, and played in unofficial Northern Ireland matches in a tour of North America (1953) and against South Africa (1958). He was named the Ulster Footballer of the Year for the 1959–60 season.

== Legacy ==
The Billy Neill MBE Country Park, as well as Billy Neill MBE Soccer School of Excellence in Dundonald, County Down is named after him in commemoration.

== Sources ==
- Billy Neill, Northern Ireland's Footballing Greats
