= Ballybeen =

Housing estate near Belfast, Northern Ireland

Coordinates: 54°35′26″N 5°47′20″W

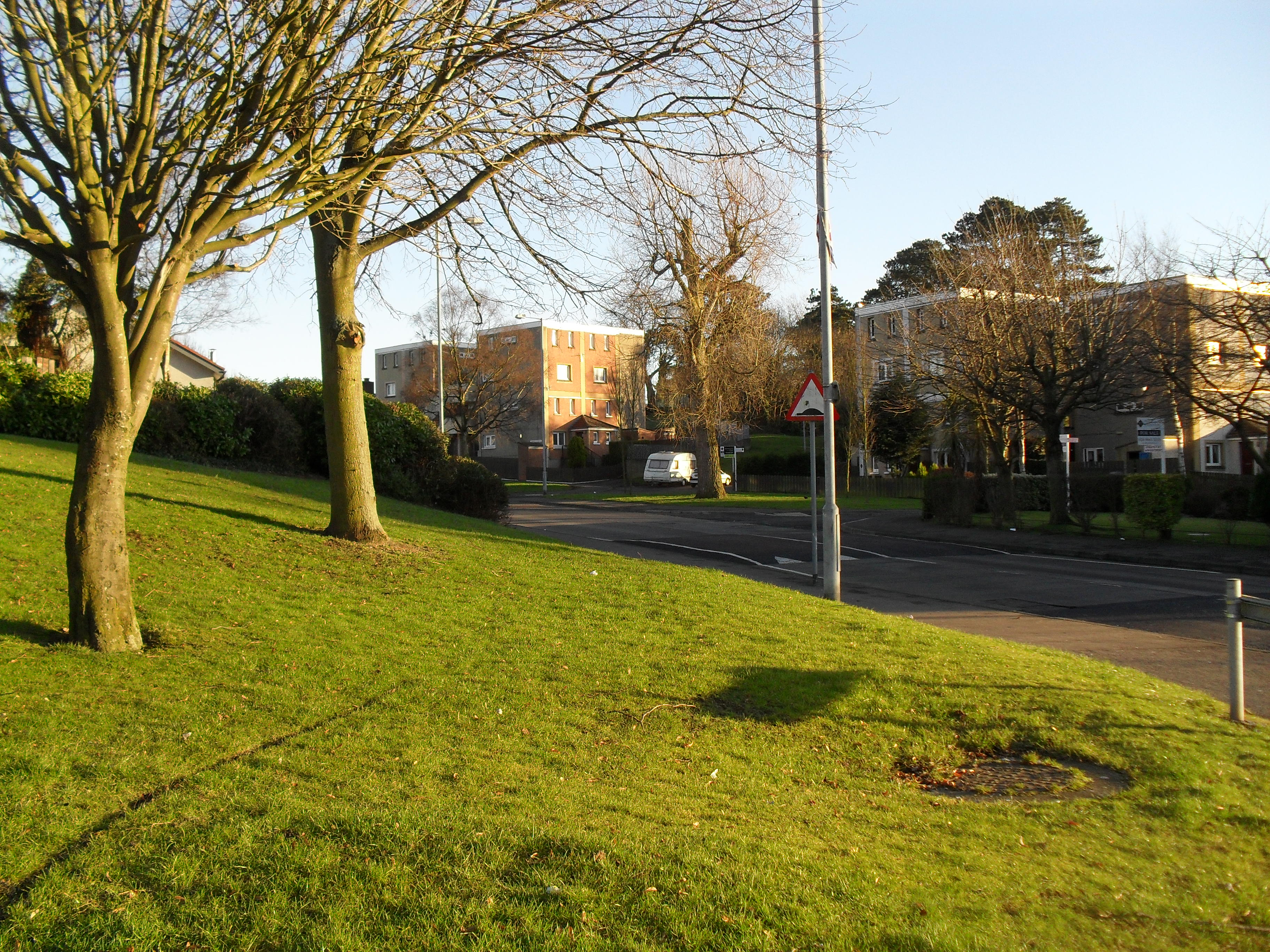
Apartment blocks in Ballybeen

Ballybeen (from Irish Baile Bín 'Bín's townland'), also known as Ballybeen Housing Estate, is the second-biggest housing estate in Northern Ireland. It is in the village of Dundonald, on the outskirts of east Belfast. It lies within the townlands of Ballybeen and Carrowreagh, between the Newtownards Road and Comber Road. Started in 1963, and mostly completed by 1971, the estate consists of some 2,400 dwellings. Most of the street names are Scottish in origin (Enler and Brooklands being the exception) as the architects who designed the estates layout mostly came from Scotland. It lies within the Borough of Castlereagh and the Belfast East Parliamentary and Assembly constituency. In the 2001 census the area had a population of 9,170.

== History ==
It is mainly a Protestant area, although before 1970 and the onset of The Troubles, about 20 per cent of the population were Catholic. During The Troubles the estate became a loyalist stronghold. Andy Tyrie, Ulster Army Council leader and commander of the Ulster Defence Association in the 1970s, was from the estate.

The estate was named after the nearby townland of Ballybeen, home to the Robb family of farmers and landowners. The Robb family house, which then became the Housing Executive offices, was knocked down when the Housing Executive relocated to their new premises at the junction of Robbs road and Church Road in the late 1980s. "Esker", the house that was built to accommodate the growing Robb family still stands today at the junction of Rank road and Church Road.

== Sport ==
43rd Dundonald F.C, situated in the Ballybeen Sport and Wellbeing Hub on Brooklands Rd play in the Down Area Winter Football League. The sport and wellbeing hub contains facilities such as a 4G pitch, changing rooms, showers etc.

The Ballyoran Community Centre has indoor facilities for Netball, Volleyball, Bowls, 5-a-side football and Basketball. The community centre also features an IFA grade 3G pitch.

== Notable residents ==
- BBC Radio 5 Live personality (and former BBC Radio 1 DJ) Colin Murray lived in the estate for a few years in Enler Park.
- George Cassidy, jazz musician, lead saxophonist in the Regal Accordion and Saxophone Band, and music teacher to Van Morrison lived in Ballybeen in the 1960's in Morven Park.
