= Robert James Patterson =

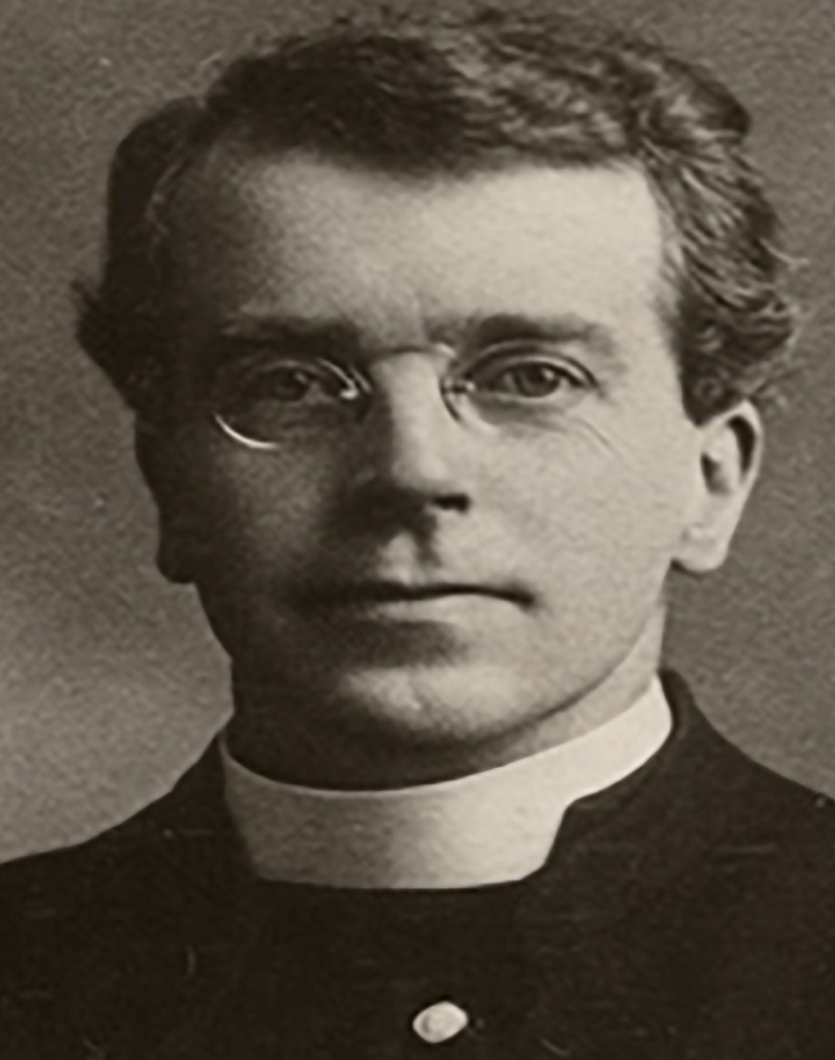
Rev Robert James Patterson

Rev Robert James Patterson B.A LL.B (also styled as R.J Patterson) (1 January 1868 - 9 October 1930) was an Irish Presbyterian minister, social reformer, and the founder of the worldwide Catch-My-Pal Total Abstinence Union. He was born in Whitecross, County Armagh and was brought up by his Aunt (Helena Reid) and Uncle (Rev. James Patterson) in Bray, County Wicklow.

Rev Patterson read Law, gaining his LLB at Trinity College Dublin.

He met his wife, Sophia ('May'), when working in London and she returned to Ireland with him where they had two sons, Samuel Canon Wiltshire Patterson, and James Hamilton Reid Patterson, whilst living in Armagh.

Rev. Robert Patterson was the Minister of the 3rd Armagh Congregation of the Presbyterian Church in Ireland, where he was ordained, who went on to become full-time Organising Secretary of the Union and was later Minister of the Crumlin Road Congregation in Belfast. Patterson was a pioneer in the field of Presbyterian/Roman Catholic Inter-Church relations. The movement attracted a large number of followers in Ireland and Great Britain. In 1914 Patterson claimed that "About 140,000 men and women joined the Union during the first year in Ireland; and almost 500 branches were formed in less than two years'.

As the Catch-My-Pal movement grew, and Patterson's book 'The Happy Art of Catching Men: A story of Good Samaritanship' was published in 1914, his travel schedule became extensive, travelling over 21,000 miles in just one year around the USA and Canada. The dedication in his book to his wife referenced this frequent travel.

Rev Patterson died at home in Belfast in October 1930 from a heart condition, survived by his two sons, and three and half years before the birth of his first grandchild. He is buried in Dundonald Cemetery with his wife.
