= Moat Park Rangers F.C. =

Moat Park Rangers Football Club
- Nickname(s): Rangers, The Moat
- Founded: 2005
- Ground: Billy Neil Pitches Moat Park Playing Fields
- League: Down Area Winter Football League

Moat Park Rangers F.C, or simply Moat Park Rangers, is a Northern Irish amateur football club playing in the Down Area Winter Football League. They were formed in 2005, and are based in Moat Park, Dundonald, Northern Ireland.

Moat Park Rangers are governed under the County Antrim Football Association. They play at Moat Park Playing Fields and Billy Neil pitches.

== Colours and crest ==
The Moat Park Rangers play in yellow and black, with blue as away colours.

The crest depicts key features of Dundonald, it includes St. Elizabeth's Church, Cleland Mausoleum and the Moat Hill.

== Club honours ==
Down Area Winter Football League:

- Premier Division
  - 2013/2014
- Reserve Division 1
  - 2010/2011
  - 2013/2014
  - 2014/2015
- Billy Allen Memorial Shield
  - 2010/2011
  - 2012/2013
- Sittlington Cup
  - 2013/2014
- Tommy Murphy Memorial Shield
  - 2008/2009
  - 2009/2010
  - 2012/2013
  - 2013/2014
- Mervyn Bassett Cup
  - 2009/2010
- Frank Moore Memorial Cup
  - 2016/2017
