= Junior Belfast Giants =

The Junior Belfast Giants is an ice hockey team who play in the Junior Scottish Ice Hockey League. They play their games in the SSE Arena, Belfast Northern Ireland and train in Dundonald International Ice Bowl.

They use the same name and logo as the Belfast Giants who play in the UK-wide Elite Ice Hockey League.

== History ==
The Junior Belfast Giants were officially formed in June 2007 when the Belfast City Flyers and the Northern Ireland Ice Hockey club combined forces because they felt the best way to further the sport in the area was to form one strong club. Todd Kelman, General Manager of the Belfast Giants helped the club find a main sponsor and allowed the club to use the Belfast Giants name. But other than that, the 2 teams are not related.

== U12 ==
The Under 12s Junior Belfast Giants Team had a great season and were runners up for the Scottish Cup which was held in Dundee ice rink.

Standings
Season	Place
2023-2024	4th
2024-2025	Scottish Cup Runners Up (2nd)

== U14 ==
Standings
Season	Place
2024-2025	6th
