= Catch-my-Pal =

Former Irish anti-alcohol organization

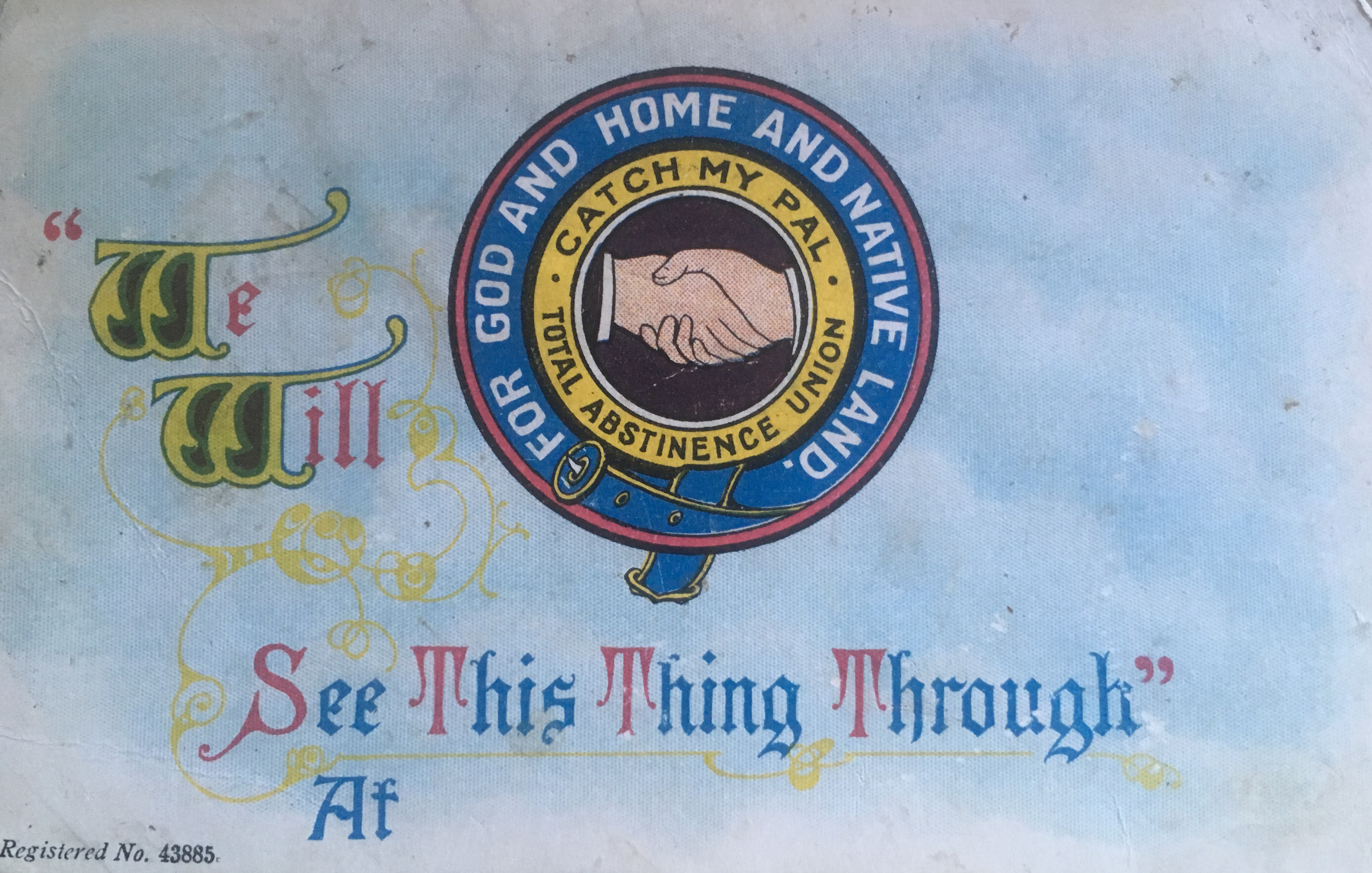
Catch-my-Pal postcard sent from Lisbellaw to Tempo in 1910.

Catch-my-Pal, alternatively known as the 'Protestant Total-Abstinence Union', was an anti-alcohol organisation founded on 13 July 1909 in Armagh, Ireland. The organisation closed down in January 1970, when its last club stopped operations.

Its distinctive feature was that members would competitively persuade one of their friends to come with them and take 'the pledge' at each meeting. This 'Catch-my-Pal' method—a phrase coined by its founder, Rev. Robert Patterson—was later used to recruit the 'Pals' Battalions to the British Army in World War I.

== History ==
Rev. Robert Patterson was the Minister of the 3rd Armagh Congregation of the Presbyterian Church in Ireland, who went on to become full-time Organising Secretary of the Union and was later Minister of the Crumlin Road Congregation in Belfast. Patterson was an Orangeman and a pioneer in the field of Presbyterian and Roman Catholic inter-church relations.

The Catch-my-Pal movement attracted a large number of followers in Ireland and Great Britain. In 1914, Patterson claimed that "About 140,000 men and women joined the Union during the first year in Ireland; and almost 500 branches were formed in less than two years'.

While he was on a tour of the United States, Patterson told the Springfield Republican about the organisation's founding:

… there were 32 men in my study … some of the biggest blackguards and boozers and drunkards in the town were there. One of them hadn’t been sober for twenty years except six months that he was in jail. I gave them the pledge and there and then we founded the Armagh City Protestant Total Abstinence Union. When we grew a little bigger we changed the ‘City’ to ‘County’ and then we dropped the first two words of the title altogether and [in October 1910], we had over 130,000 enrolled members.

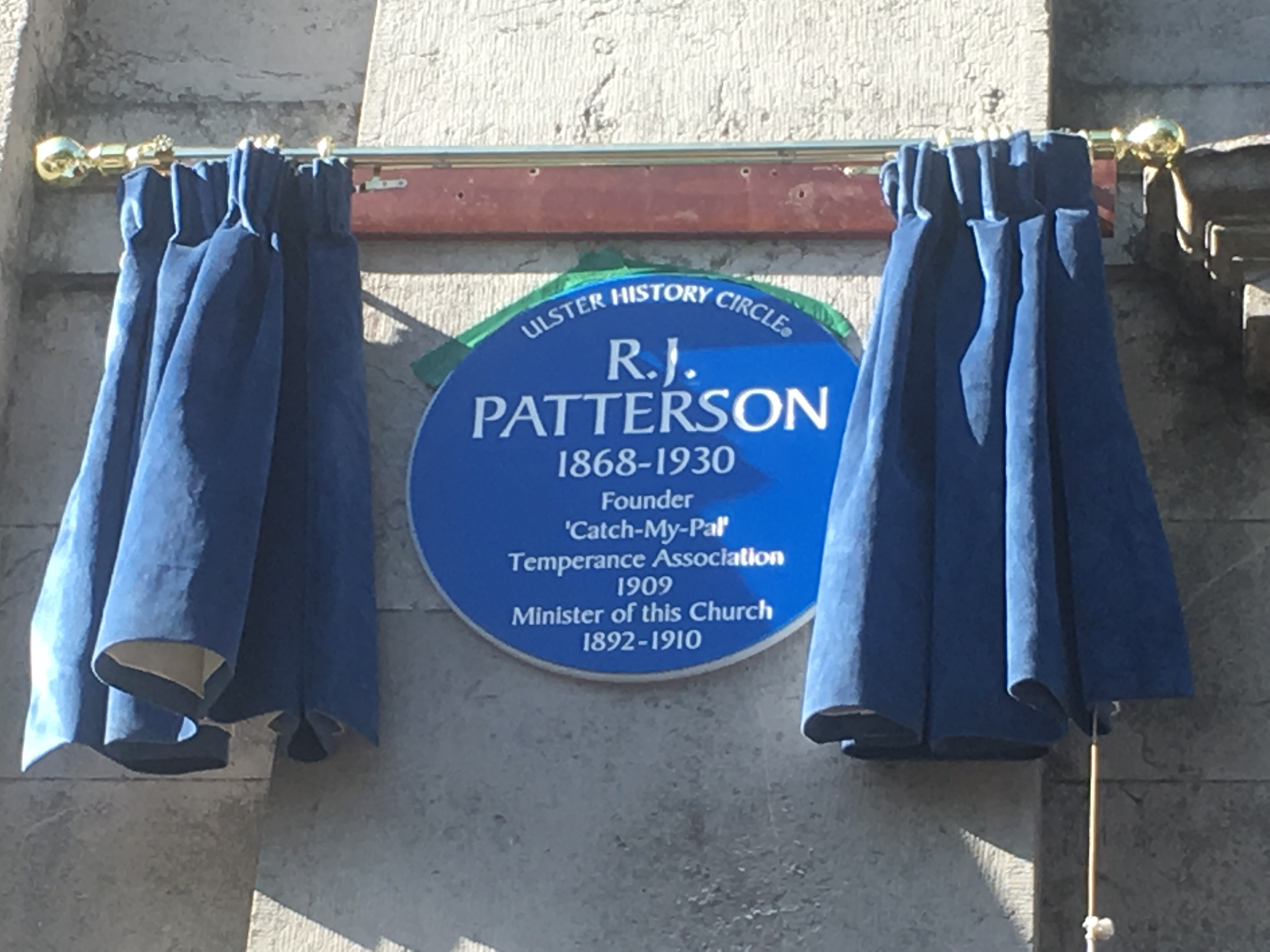
Blue Plaque on The Mall Meeting House

Patterson was a well-known figure at the time, touring extensively in the British Empire and the United States. His writing was quoted approvingly by the 'baseball evangelist' Billy Sunday.

The organisation flourished in the years before the First World War, in which many of its members fought, and continued in existence in Northern Ireland, Scotland and Australia through the 1950s and 1960s. The last official club closed in 1970. There is a snooker hall in Dunmurry bearing the name Catch-my-Pal, but it is not a temperance organisation.

A 'Blue Plaque' historical marker dedicated to Robert Patterson was erected on the facade of The Mall Meeting House in Armagh on 20 September 2019. It was unveiled by Rev. William Henry, the Moderator of the General Assembly.
