= Chadian People's Revolutionary Movement =

Rebel group that sought to overthrow Hissène Habré's government

Chadian People's Revolutionary Movement (Mouvement Revolutionnaire du Peuple Tchadien or MPR) was a Chadian rebel group that operated in southern Chad in the 1980s. The MPR, headed by Wadel Abdelkader Kamougué, vice-president of the GUNT, wanted to overthrow the government of Hissène Habré and replace it with a decentralized, federalist government. Backed by Libya, while the MPR had hardly any troops on the ground, it was considered all the same through the codos it politically represented a serious threat to Habré's rule. However, after the crushing blows inflicted to the codos in 1984 and 1985, it came to terms with the President and joined his National Union for Independence and Revolution (UNIR).
