= Multipacket reception =

In networking, multipacket reception refers to the capability of networking nodes for decoding/demodulating signals from a number of source nodes concurrently. In wireless communications, Multipacket reception is achieved using physical layer technologies like orthogonal CDMA, MIMO and space–time codes.

== See also ==
- MIMO – Wireless communication systems having multiple antennas at both transmitter and receiver.
- CDMA – Code division multiple access
