= Agnes Romilly White =

Irish novelist (1872–1945)

- Born: 4 August 1872; Dungannon, County Tyrone, Ireland
- Died: 11 June 1945 (age 72); Antrim, Ireland
- Occupation: Writer

Agnes Romilly White (4 August 1872 – 11 June 1945) was an Irish novelist and poet, who wrote two novels in the 1930s, about an Irish village in the 1890s, and the human dramas and comedies therein.

== Biography ==
White was the born in Dungannon, Tyrone, the daughter of Rev. Robert White and his wife Anna Maria Matthews White. Her father was the rector of St. Elizabeth's Church of Ireland and was based in Dundonald, now a suburb of Belfast, from 1890 to 1912. White had at least two sisters and two brothers. One of her brothers was Herbert Martin Oliver White, a lecturer at Queen's University, who was appointed to the Chair of English at Trinity College Dublin over the poet Austin Clarke.

White died in 1945, at the age of 72, in Antrim. Both of her novels were reprinted in the 1980s. Trinity College Dublin holds a collection of her correspondence.

Agnes Romilly White is buried in St. Elizabeth's Churchyard in Church Quarter, Dundonald.

== Publications ==
White made the small village of Dundonald and the cottages famous in her two novels, Gape Row (1934) and Mrs. Murphy Buries the Hatchet (1936). Reviews of White's work appeared in major publications. Country Life described Gape Row as "enchanting", "a fascinating picture of peasant life", "full of humour and humanity." In the London Mercury, a reviewer wrote that "the plot is wound up rather too tidily—with the aid of coincidence and the local witch," in Mrs. Murphy Buries the Hatchet, "but the people are alive, and Mrs. Murphy's endless conversation is extremely entertaining."

C. S. Lewis, who lived in Dundonald as a boy, wrote about Gape Row to a friend: "It is not a very good novel" but added that "The scenery is quite well described, and it is probably the only chance you or I will ever have of seeing that landscape described in fiction."

Her poetry appeared in Irish Monthly and The New Ireland Review.

=== Novels ===
- Gape Row (1934)
- Mrs. Murphy Buries the Hatchet (1936)

=== Poetry ===
- "Blossoms" (1897, Irish Monthly)
- "White Roses" (1897, Irish Monthly)
- "You Never Come" (1897, Irish Monthly)
- "A Grey House by the Sea" (1902, Irish Monthly)
- "After the Children's Practice" (1902, Irish Monthly)
- "Come!" (1902, Irish Monthly)
- "Dawn" (1902, The New Ireland Review)
- "Come Back, Asthore!" (1902, The New Ireland Review)
- "Daffodil" (1903, The Irish Monthly)
- "Window-Lights at Sea" (1903, The Irish Monthly)
