= Matched precipitation rate =

In the irrigation industry, matched precipitation rate (MPR) is a term that is used to calculate the amount of precipitation in a given area is uniform. In order to be "matched" all sprinkler heads in a given zone must have the same rate of precipitation. This can be achieved by matching the gallonage of a standard rotor to its arc and reducing range accordingly (i.e. 2 gallons at 90 degrees, 4 gallons at 180 degrees, or 8 gallons if the head does a full circle) or by using MPR nozzles or sprinklers. Virtually all major sprinkler manufactures offer some type of MPR nozzle or sprinkler. The primary benefit and main goal of MPR sprinklers is to prevent water waste from run-off while still ensuring that the area receives adequate moisture.

== Formula ==
The mathematical formula for determining precipitation rate is (GPM x 96.3 ÷ area) = PR

== History ==
The first MPR nozzles, the MP Rotator, were produced by Nelson Irrigation in 2003, and acquired by Hunter Industries in 2007. Since then the popularity of these highly uniform yet low application sprinklers has caused every major sprinkler manufacturer to produce their own version of an MPR sprinkler, including Rain Bird and Toro.
