= Dundonald International Ice Bowl =

Ice rink in Dundonald, Northern Ireland

Coordinates: 54.587°N 5.818°W

- Address: Northern Ireland
- Location: Dundonald, County Down
- Type: Ice rink

Construction
- Opened: 1986

The Dundonald International Ice Bowl is an ice rink in Dundonald, County Down, Northern Ireland. It was opened in 1986 by Peter Robinson.

== Tenants ==
=== Current tenants ===
- Ice Rink
- Alaska Sports Diner (2004–present)
- Xtreme Bowling (1990's-present)
- Indiana Land (Children's Mayan themed playzone, 1993–present)
- Battlefield Sports N.I. (Laser Combat and Airsoft Games, 2005–Present)
- Clip 'n' Climb (2012–present)

=== Former tenants ===
- Tenpin Bowling (1986-1990s)
- Blades Sports Bar (1986-2004)
- Choc-O-Bloc (Ice Cream, 2009–201?)

=== Outside tenants ===
- Urban Assault (1990–present)
- Pirate Adventure Golf (2004–present) Sometimes called Crazy Golf

Behind the Ice Bowl is the David Lloyd Fitness Centre, and across the road is the Hanwood Business Park and the Dundonald OmniPark (previously Eastpoint Leisure Village from 2009 to June 2015). Together, they all make up the Dundonald Leisure Park. There is planning permission for a hotel to be built next to the Ice Bowl and Fitness Centre since the early 2000s.

=== Pirates Adventure Golf ===
In 2004, a new golf course opened. It was built where the original main car park was. It has two courses, Blackbeard's Adventure and The Captain's Challenge. In the Winter, a giant cover goes over the Blackbeard's Adventure course so visitors don't get put off and the track stays dry.

== Ice hockey ==
It is the training base and a secondary venue of the Belfast Giants ice hockey team.

During the 2008–09 Elite Ice Hockey League season, the venue hosted the second leg of the Challenge Cup final, which was won 3–1 by the Giants, giving them a 6–5 aggregate victory.

== Music ==
The Dundonald Ice Bowl has also been used as a music venue over the years. Artists that have played in the Ice Bowl include Bob Dylan, Bryan Adams, Van Morrison, The Everly Brothers and The Prodigy.

== Redevelopment ==
A redevelopment of the Dundonald International Ice Bowl began in 2024, with the project expected to be completed in 2027. The project will see the construction of a new multi-million-pound facility that will include a new Olympic-sized ice rink, a 24-lane tenpin bowling alley, and a 100-station gym.

== See also ==
- List of tourist attractions in Ireland
