= Dundalk Bulls =

- Founded: 2007
- Dissolved: 2010
- League: Irish Ice Hockey League and the Celtic Cup
- Based in: Dundalk, County Louth, Ireland
- Arena: Dundalk Ice Dome
- Colours: White, Black & Red

The Dundalk Bulls were an ice hockey team from Dundalk, Ireland that competed in the Irish Ice Hockey League and the Celtic Cup League, with games being played in Ireland and Scotland. Home games were played at the 1,200-seat capacity Dundalk Ice Dome, which used to be home to Team Ireland and hosted the Division 3 Ice Hockey World Championships in April 2007. The club has not fielded a team since the closure of the Dundalk Ice Dome in May 2010 and appears no longer to exist.

== Team ==
The Bulls were coached by Kenny Redmond, a former player for the Dundalk Bulls club. Dundalk Bulls won the IIHL's first championship in 2008. Following this, they qualified to represent Ireland in the European Continental Cup in September in Serbia. They finished third in their group.

== Other programs ==
At its peak, Dundalk Bulls Club had three senior teams - Senior A men's team, (who played in Celtic Cup and IIHL), Senior B men's recreational team (who played in IIHRL) and Senior Ladies team (who played in IIHRL). Mr Kenny Redmond was head of hockey operations for the club with Ms Seanna Conway in the role of ladies development officer.

== Closure ==
Dundalk Ice Dome closed in May 2010 and the Bulls have not fielded a team since then. The club is understood to be in abeyance, if not dissolved.
