= Ulster Hospital =

Hospital in Northern Ireland

- South Eastern Health and Social Care Trust
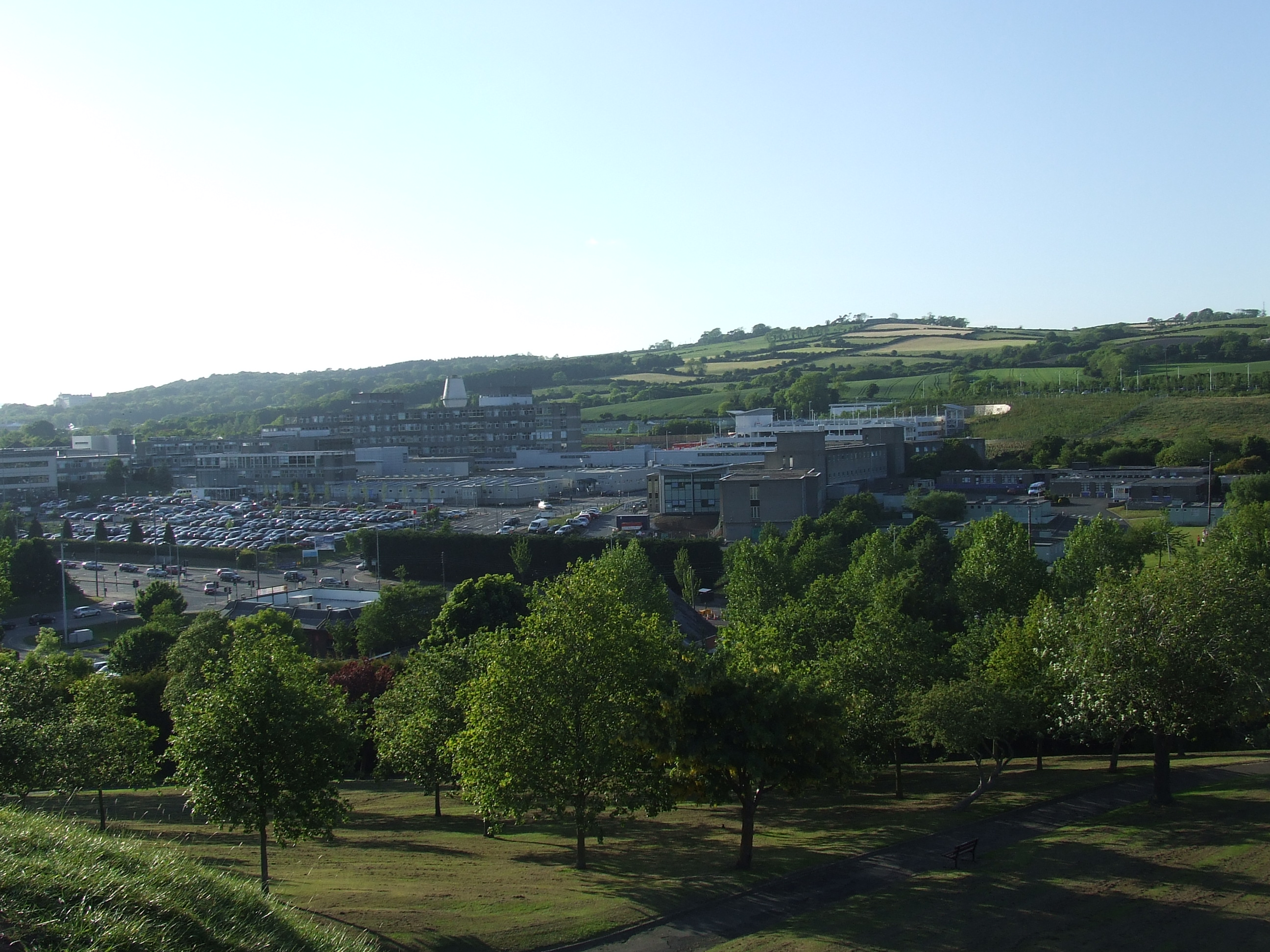
- Ulster Hospital

- Location in Northern Ireland

Geography
- Location: Dundonald, County Down, Northern Ireland, United Kingdom
- Coordinates: 54.597°N 5.812°W

Organisation
- Care system: Health and Social Care in Northern Ireland
- Type: District General

Services
- Emergency department: Yes Accident & Emergency

History
- Founded: 1872

Links
- Website: https://setrust.hscni.net
- Lists: Hospitals in Northern Ireland

The Ulster Hospital, commonly known as the Ulster, is a teaching hospital in Dundonald (at the eastern edge of Belfast) in County Down, Northern Ireland. It is within the townland of Ballyregan, beside the A20 road. It provides acute services in the North Down, Ards and Castlereagh council areas, as well as east Belfast. It is managed by the South Eastern Health and Social Care Trust.

== History ==
The hospital was first founded as the Ulster Hospital for Women and Sick Children in 1872. It was initially located on Chichester Street in Belfast City Centre but moved to Templemore Avenue in Mountpottinger in 1892.

The first X-ray machine at the hospital was installed in 1920 and Dr Beath was employed to operate it.

While located in Mountpottinger the hospital was severely damaged in the Belfast Blitz in 1941. It was relocated to Dundonald and renamed the Ulster Hospital. The 500-bed hospital on the new site was designed by renowned modernist architect Frederick Gibberd. lt was opened in 1962 by the Duchess of Gloucester, who described it as ‘not only of functional excellence but also of distinctive beauty’.

Over several decades demand on hospital inpatient services increased, and resulting shortfalls in bed capacity and funding were reported by the local news media around the millennium.

A redevelopment programme was announced in 2001, and in February 2003 the hospital was designated as one of the nine acute hospitals in the acute hospital network of Northern Ireland on which healthcare would be focused under the government health policy 'Developing Better Services'.

The redevelopment programme has included the building of a renal unit (completed in 2006), a maternity unit (completed in 2007), a multistorey car park (completed in 2007) and a critical care complex accommodating state-of-the-art intensive care unit, theatres, laboratories and a sterile services department (completed in 2010).

In June 2011, the Ulster Hospital was granted University Teaching Hospital status by Queen's University Belfast, and an undergraduate sub-deanery was created within the Trust.

A new inpatient ward block was completed in April 2017 and a new acute services block was opened in 2021.
