= Dundalk Ice Dome =

Irish ice hockey arena

Coordinates: 53°59′11.7″N 6°22′29.9″W

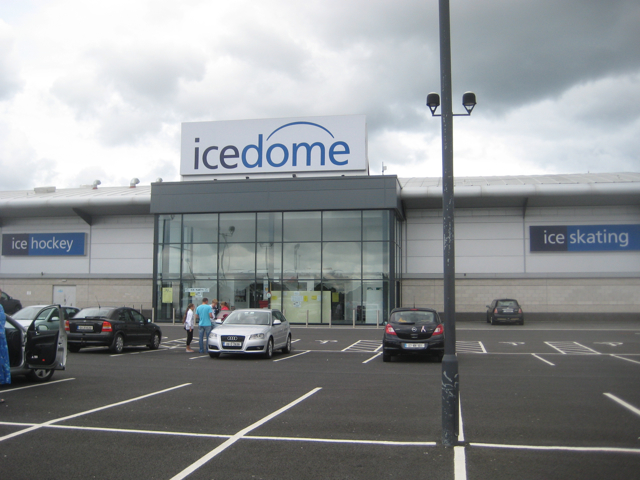
- Interactive map of Dundalk Ice Dome
- Location: Dundalk, County Louth, Ireland
- Capacity: 1,200

Construction
- Opened: December 2006
- Closed: May 2010

Tenants
- Ireland men's national ice hockey team Dundalk Bulls

Dundalk Ice Dome was the first permanent ice arena in Ireland, located in Dundalk Retail Park, Dundalk, County Louth, Ireland. The Ice Dome aimed to become the centre of excellence for ice hockey in Ireland. It was home to the Irish national ice hockey squad and local team the Dundalk Bulls. For 2007 and 2008, the venue was used as a secondary venue by the Belfast Giants. The Ice Dome was closed in early May 2010 with plans to open under new management by Planet Ice; however, this has yet to happen and the rink remained closed.

== Ice Hockey World Championships ==
In April 2007, Dundalk Ice Dome staged the International Ice Hockey Federation Division III World Championships, where Team Ireland claimed a silver medal and promotion to Division II .
