= A20 road (Northern Ireland) =

Road in Northern Ireland

Coordinates: 54.50494°N 5.54003°W

A20

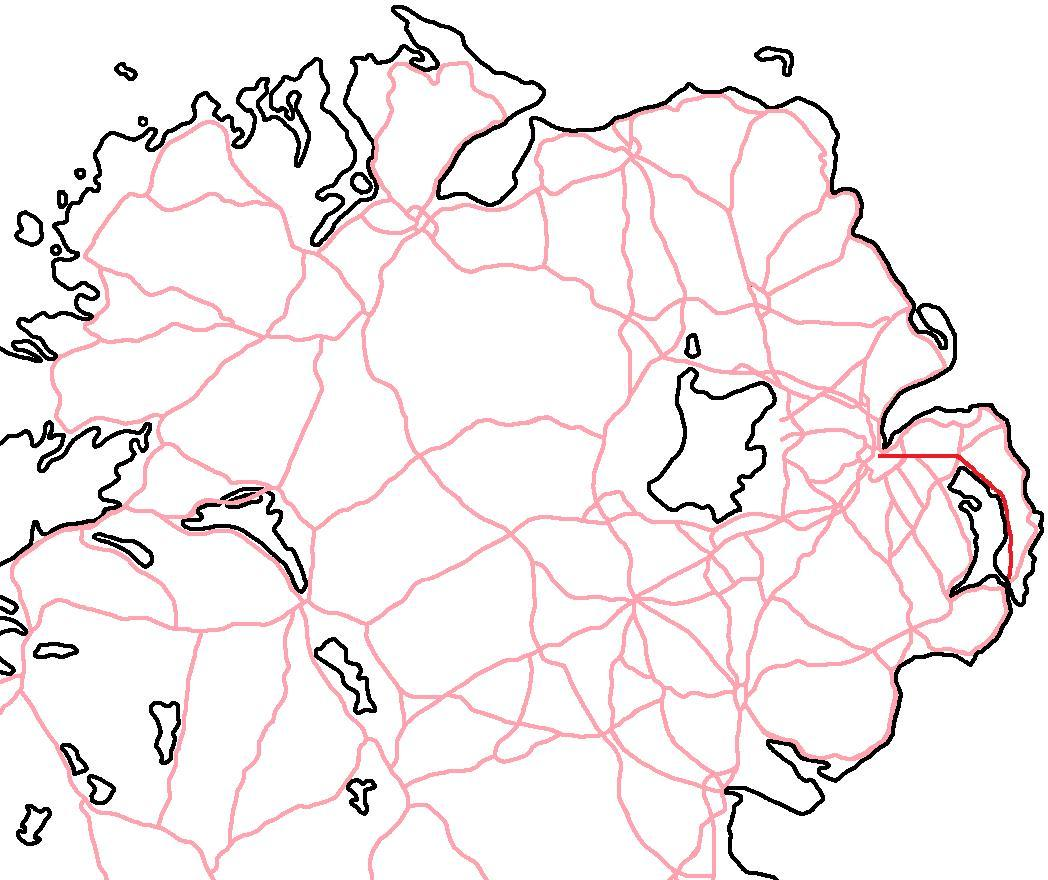
- The route of the A20 in red from Belfast city centre (County Antrim) to Portaferry (County Down)

Location
- Country: United Kingdom
- Constituent country: Northern Ireland
- Primary destinations: Belfast; Dundonald; Newtownards; Portaferry

Road network
- Roads in Northern Ireland; Motorways; A roads in Northern Ireland

The A20 is a road in County Down in Northern Ireland. It runs from Belfast to Newtownards and on to Portaferry.

== Route ==
Beginning as the Newtownards Road at the junction of Bridge End close to Belfast city centre, the road runs in an easterly direction through east Belfast. The early parts of the road are mainly working-class Protestant districts with strong links to the nearby Harland & Wolff shipyard. After the junction of the Holywood Road, it becomes the Upper Newtownards Road and enters the middle-class areas of Ballyhackamore, Knock and Stormont, where it passes the Parliament Buildings and Dundonald Cemetery.

After leaving Belfast and passing through Dundonald, the road becomes a dual carriageway, passing through a mainly agricultural area before arriving in Newtownards.

After Newtownards, the road follows the Strangford Lough shore to Portaferry, close to the end of the Ards Peninsula. Here, a ferry service is available to Strangford. In Portaferry the road joins the A2 coast road.
