= Pilgrimage church =

Church to which pilgrimages are regularly made

A pilgrimage church (German: Wallfahrtskirche) is a church to which pilgrimages are regularly made, or a church along a pilgrimage route, like the Way of St. James, that is visited by pilgrims.

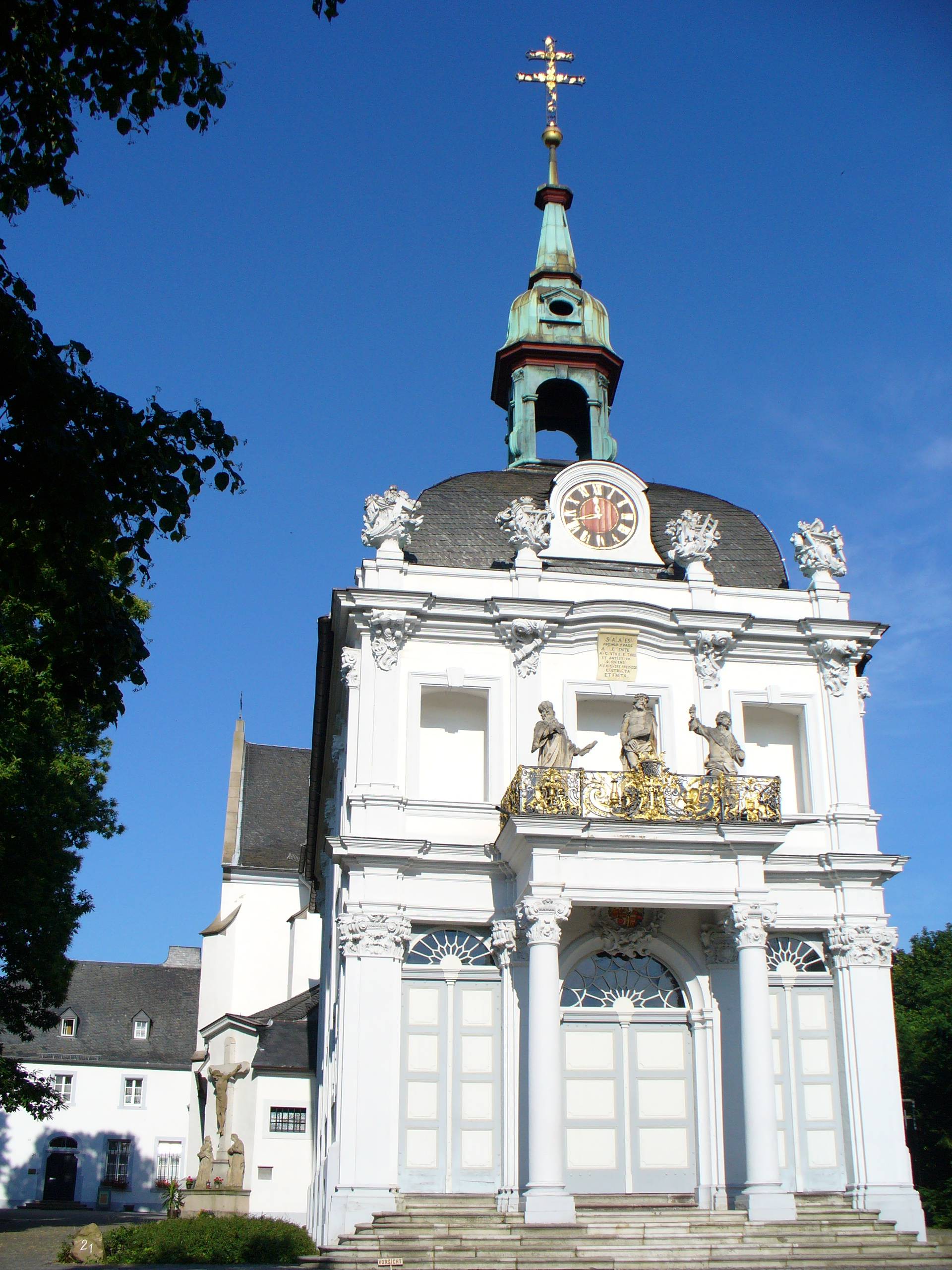
The Calvary Church in Bonn with its holy stairway

Pilgrimage churches are often located by the graves of saints, or hold portraits to which miraculous properties are ascribed or saintly relics that are safeguarded by the church for their veneration. Such relics may include the bones, books or pieces of clothing of the saints, occasionally also fragments of the cross of Jesus, pieces of the crown of thorns, the nails with which he was fixed to the cross and other similar objects. Pilgrimage churches were also built at places where miracles took place.

== List of Roman Catholic pilgrimage churches ==
Churches are listed in alphabetical order of the sites in or near where they are located.

=== Austria ===
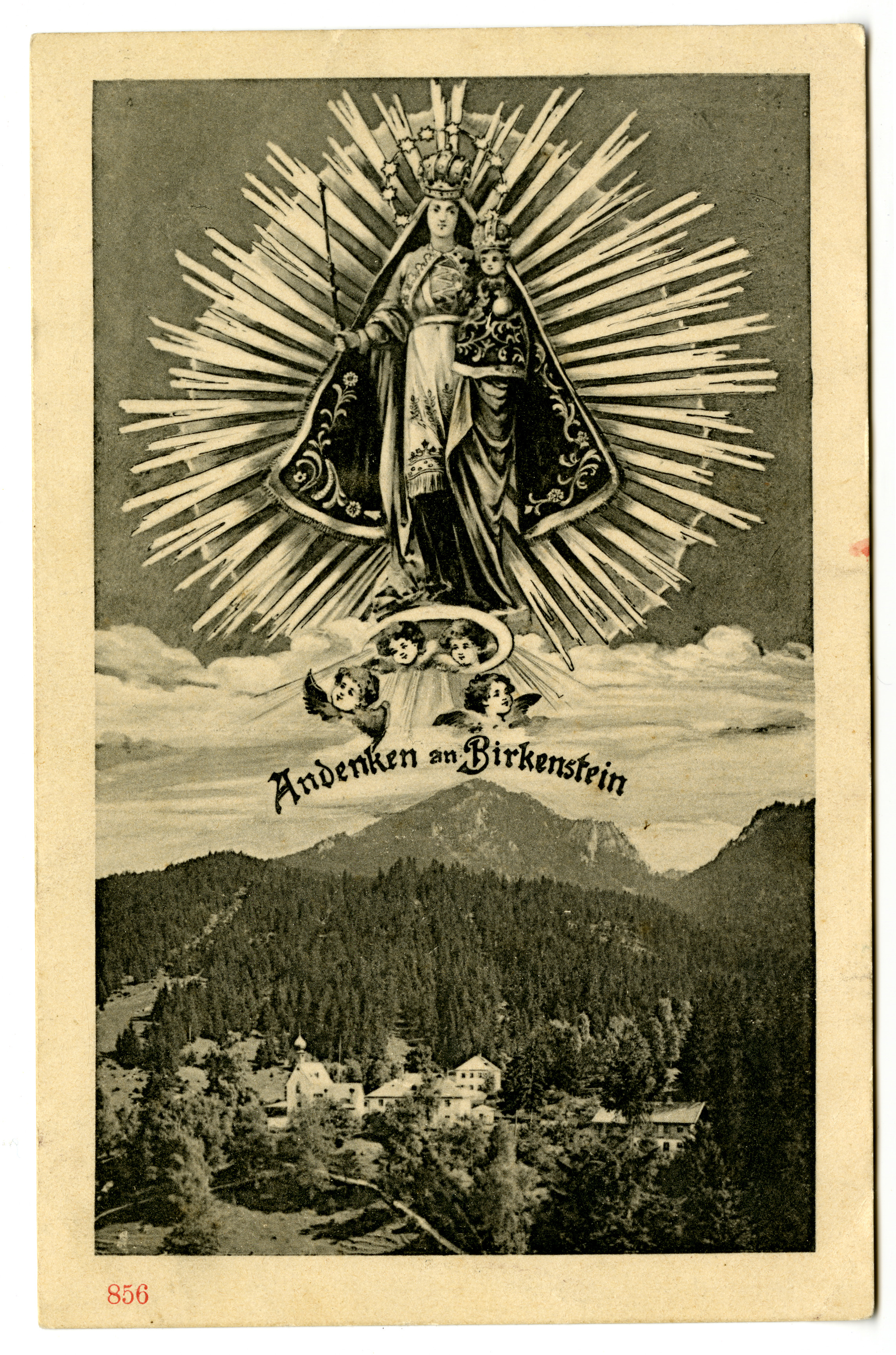
Andenken an Birkenstein postcard. University of Dayton Libraries.

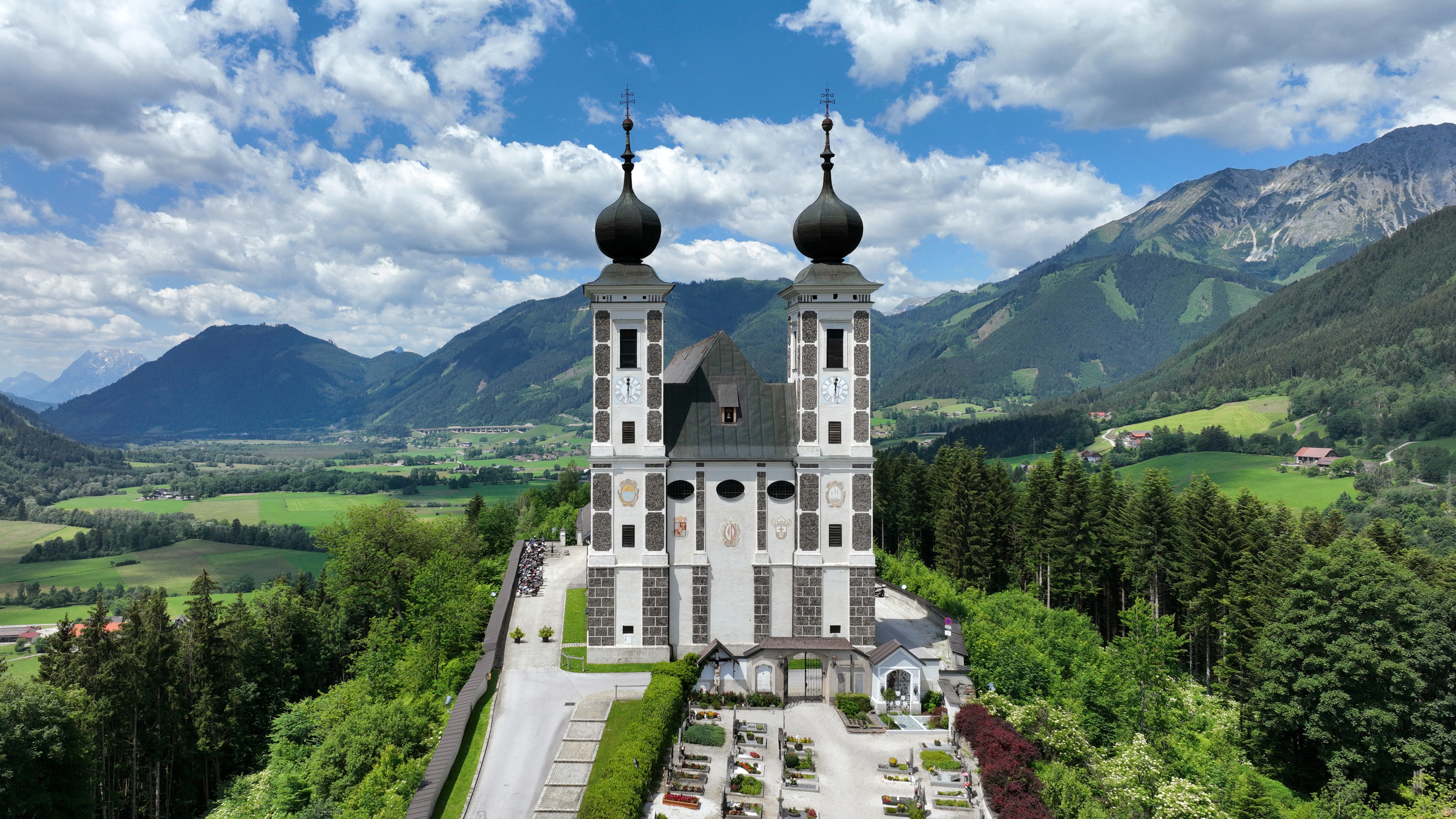
Pilgrimage Church of Frauenberg in Ardning

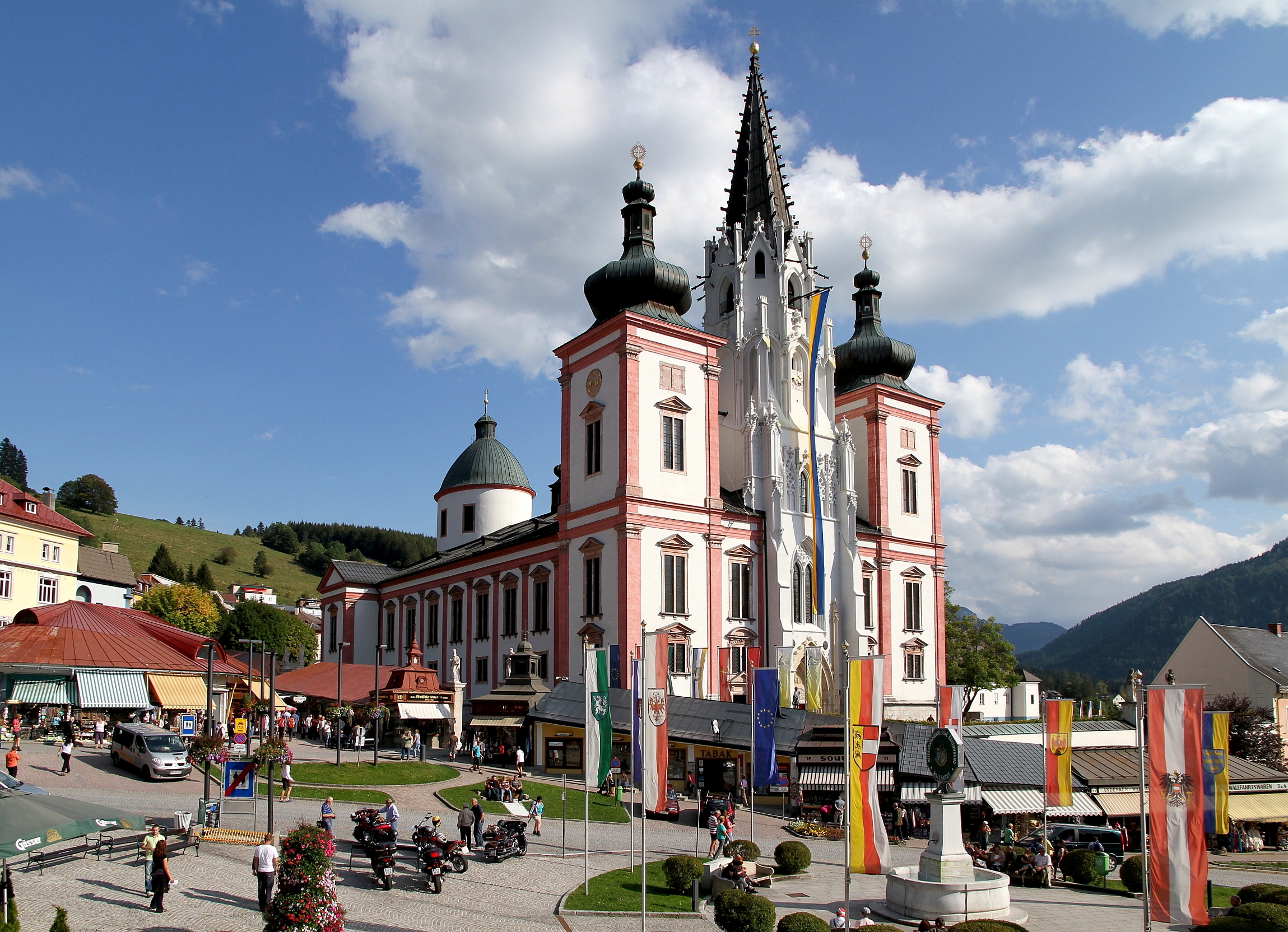
Basilica of the Birth of the Virgin Mary in Mariazell

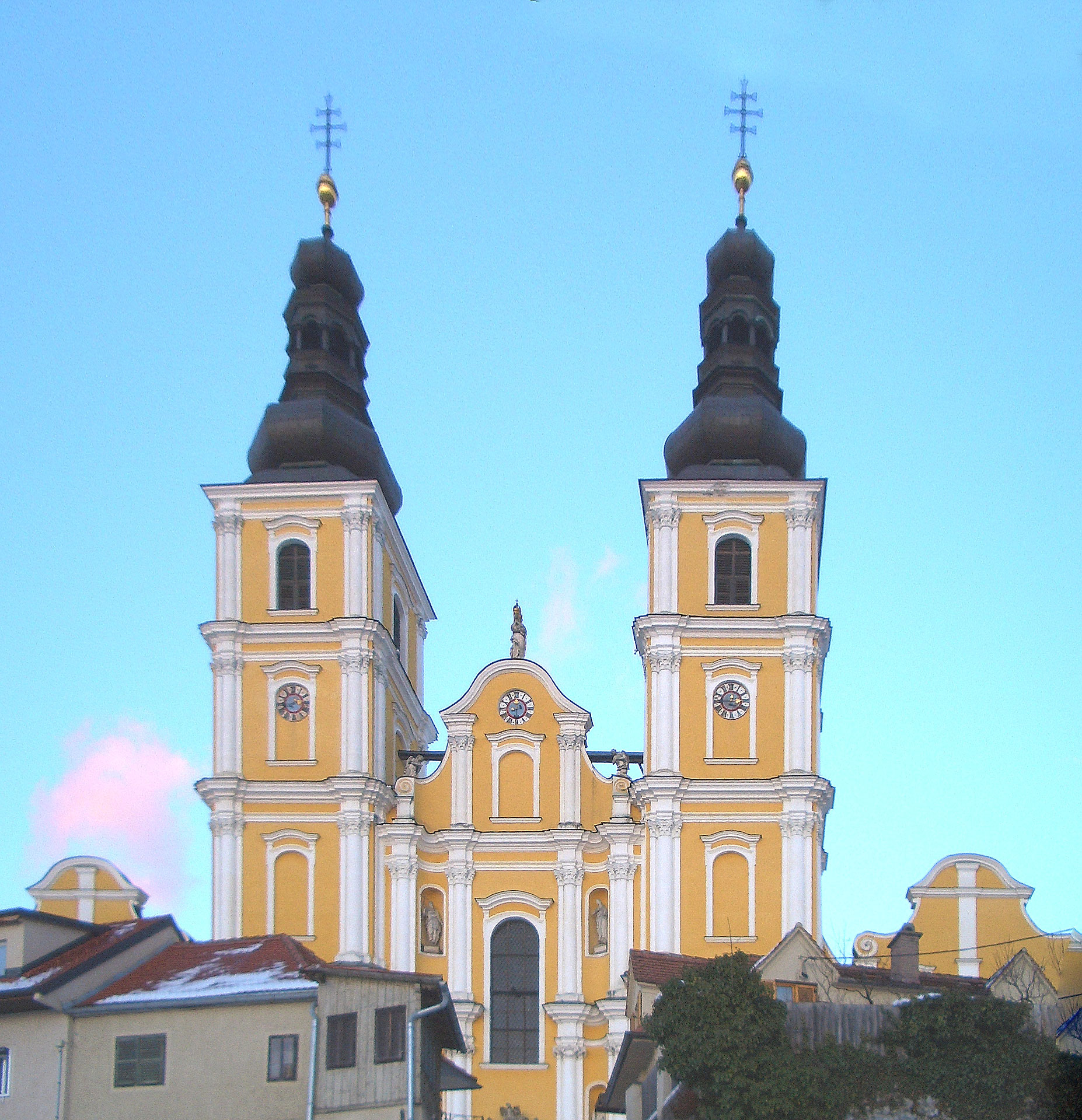
Mariatrost Basilica in Graz

- Ardning, Styria: Pilgrimage Church of Frauenberg (Wallfahrtskirche Frauenberg an der Enns)
- Bad Leonfelden, Upper Austria: Pilgrimage Church of Maria Schutz am Bründl (Katholische Kirche Maria Schutz)
- Berg bei Rohrbach, Upper Austria: Pilgrimage Church of Maria Trost (Wallfahrtskirche Maria Trost)
- Bergheim near Salzburg: Maria Plain
- Christkindl, Upper Austria: Pilgrimage Church of Christkindl (Wallfahrtskirche Christkindl)
- Fernitz, Styria: Pilgrimage Church of Maria Trost (Wallfahrtskirche Maria Trost Fernitz)
- Gaflenz, Upper Austria: St. Sebald am Heiligenstein
- Graz, Styria: Mariagrüner Kirche, Graz
- Graz, Styria: Mariatrost Basilica
- Gurk, Carinthia: Gurk Cathedral (grave of Saint Hemma of Gurk)
- Gutenstein, Lower Austria: Our Lady of Perpetual Help (Wallfahrtskirche Hilfreiche Jungfrau Maria auf dem Mariahilfberg)
- Heiligengrab, Bleiburg, Carinthia
- Horn, Lower Austria: Maria Dreieichen
- Kaltenberg, Upper Austria
- Kaltenbrunn, Tyrol
- Linz, Upper Austria: Pöstlingberg
- Maria Dornach (Mitteldorf), Großkirchheim, Carinthia
- Maria Gail, Villach
- Maria Hilf ob Guttaring, Carinthia
- Maria Laach am Jauerling, Lower Austria
- Maria Loreto, Saint Andrew i. L., Carinthia
- Maria Rain, Carinthia
- St Mary's Church, Maria Saal, Carinthia
- Maria Schmolln, Upper Austria
- Pilgrimage Church of Maria Schnee (Maria Luggau), Lesachtal, Carinthia
- Maria Schnee (at about ten places in Austria and several places in Germany and neighbouring countries)
- Mariastein, Tyrol
- Maria Taferl (most important pilgrimage site in Lower Austria)
- Maria Waitschach, Guttaring, Carinthia
- Mariazell, Styria – which in 2003–2005 was the venue for the Central European Catholics Day
- Molln, Upper Austria: Pilgrimage Church of Frauenstein
- Pottenstein: Pilgrimage Church of Maria Trost im Elend
- Poysdorf, Lower Austria: Maria Bründl
- Saalfelden, Salzburg: Pilgrimage Church of Maria Kirchenthal
- Sankt Jakob im Rosental, Carinthia: Pilgrimage Church of Maria Elend
- St. Wolfgang, Upper Austria
- Pilgrimage Church of St. Wolfgang ob Grades, Metnitz, Carinthia
- Schollach, Lower Austria: Maria Steinparz
- Seggauberg, Styria: Pilgrimage Church on the Frauenberg near Leibnitz
- Sonntagberg, Lower Austria
- Our Dear Lady, Hochfeistritz, Eberstein, Carinthia
- Zistersdorf, Lower Austria: Maria Moos (oldest spring shrine in Lower Austria)
- Sanctuary of the Christkindl Church, Steyr

=== Brazil ===
- Aparecida: great Marian sanctuary

=== Croatia ===
- Trsat, Dalmatia, Croatia: Pilgrimage Shrine of Our Lady of Trsat, Cathedral of St Vitus

=== Czech Republic ===
- Chlum Svaté Maří
- Družec: pilgrimage church of St Mary of the Assumption
- Brno-Tuřany: pilgrimage church of Church of the Annunciation
- Příbram: Svatá Hora Abbey

=== France ===
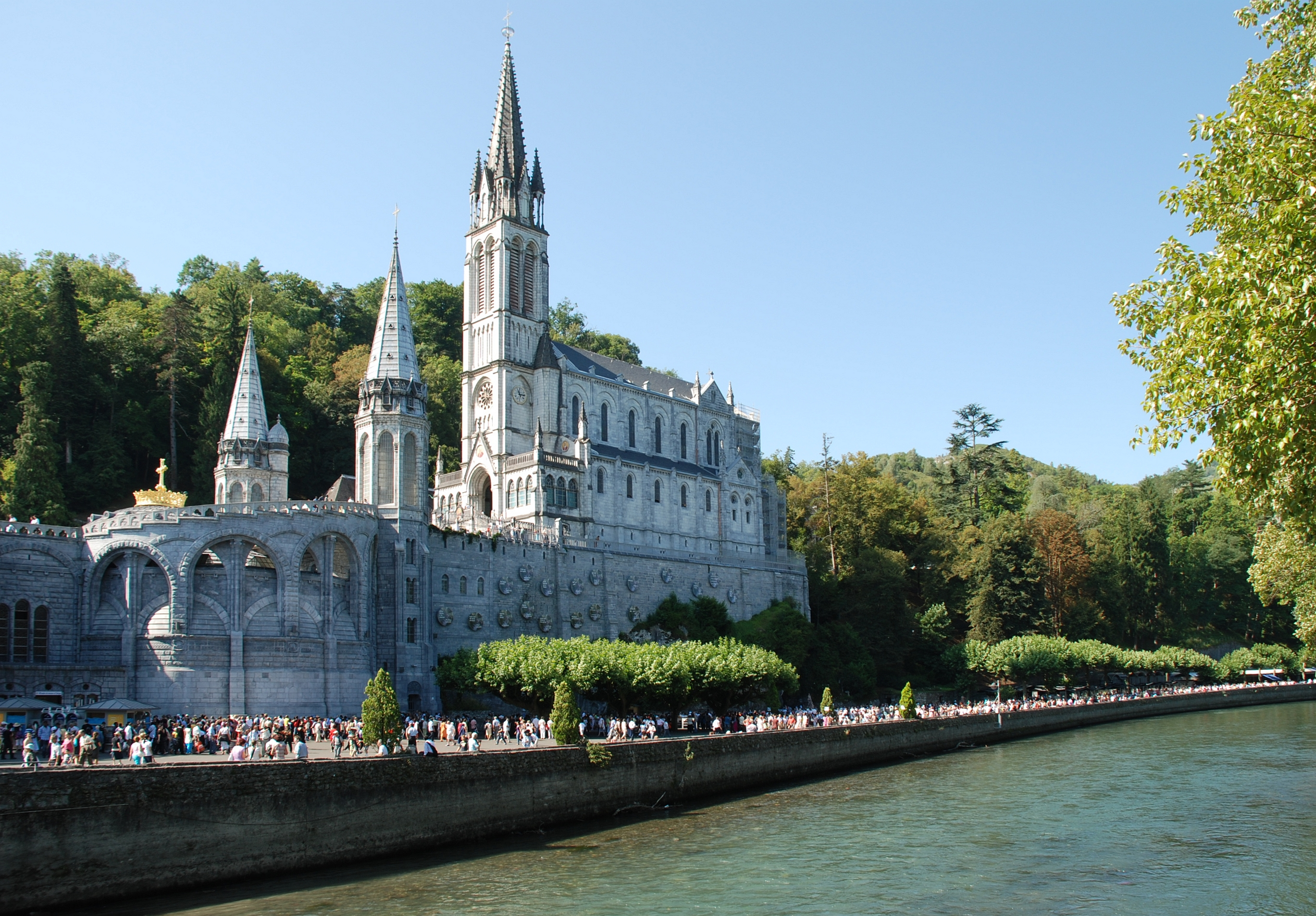
Sanctuary of Our Lady of Lourdes

- Eschau: St Trophimus' Church with the relics of Sophia the Martyr and her daughters Faith, Hope and Charity
- Haguenau: Basilica of Our Lady of Marienthal
- Le Puy-en-Velay: pilgrimage church of Notre-Dame du Puy
- Lisieux: sanctuary of saint Teresa of the Child Jesus
- Lourdes: site of Marian apparitions with the healing spring
- Neuwiller-lès-Saverne: Église Saint-Pierre-et-Saint-Paul, with the relics of local saint Adelphus
- Marseille: pilgrimage church of Notre-Dame de la Garde
- Mont St. Michel: St. Michel
- Paray-le-Monial: sanctuary of saint Margaret Mary Alacoque and the Sacred Heart
- Paris: Sainte-Chapelle with the Crown of Thorns, Catherine Labouré of Lady of Miraculous Medal
- Ronchamp: pilgrimage chapel of Notre Dame du Haut

=== Germany ===
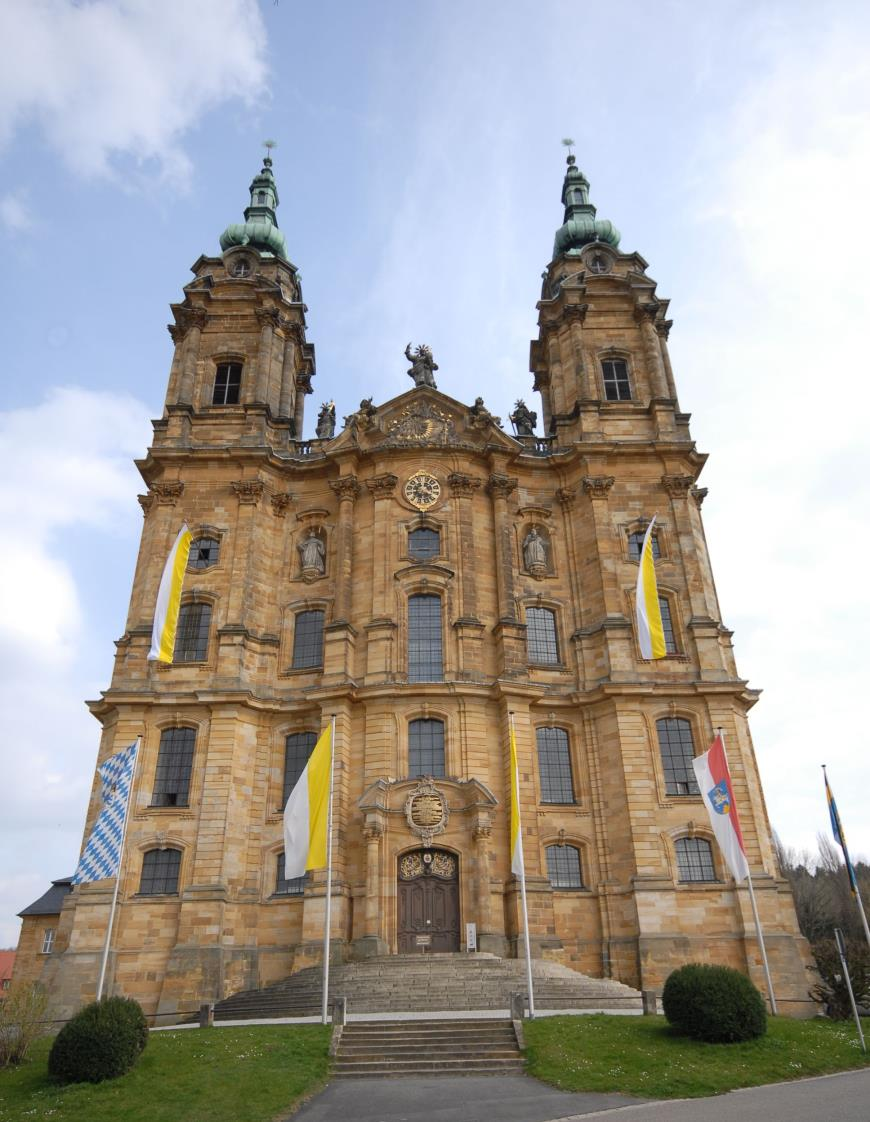
Vierzehnheiligen

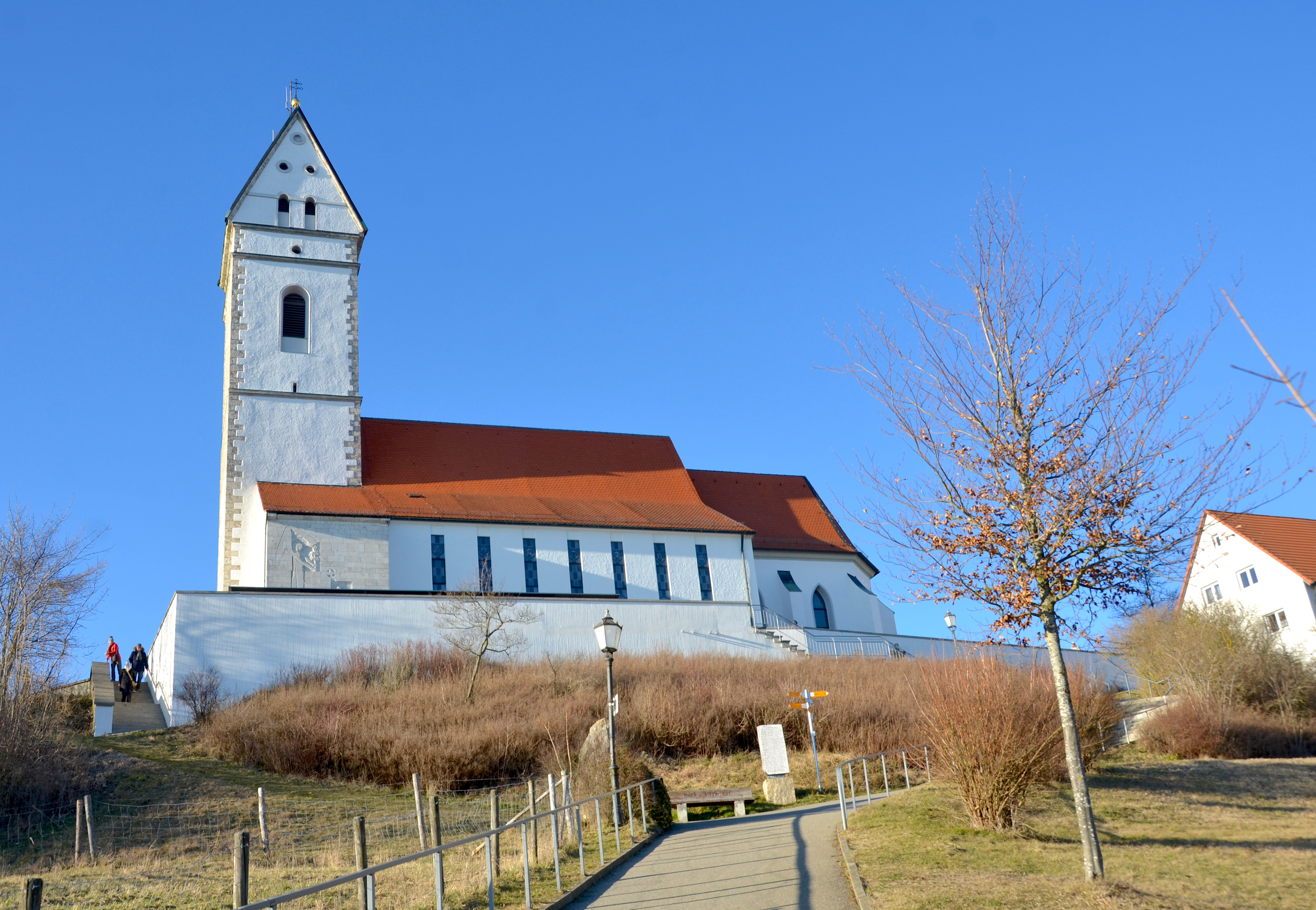
Pilgrimage church of St. John the Baptist (Bussen)

- Abensberg (Bavaria): Pilgrimage Church of St Mary of the Assumption in the village of Allersdorf
- Abtsgmünd: pilgrimage church of the Sacrifice of Mary (Mariä Opferung) in the village of Hohenstadt
- Aldenhoven: chapel of grace, parish church, Marian pilgrimage
- Altötting: Shrine of Our Lady, Marian pilgrimage
- Andechs: Pilgrimage Church of St. Nicholas and St. Elizabeth, Maria pilgrimage, eucharistic pilgrimage
- Amberg: Pilgrimage Church of Our Lady of Perpetual Help
- Armsheim (Rheinhessen): former Pilgrimage church of the Precious Blood of Christ
- Beratzhausen: pilgrimage church of Our Lady of Perpetual Help
- Bergen bei Neuburg: pilgrimage church of the Holy Cross
- Berlin-Mariendorf: Pilgrimage Church of Maria Frieden
- Beselich: Pilgrimage Chapel of Our Lady of Perpetual Help
- Bettbrunn: pilgrimage church of St Salvator
- Biberbach: St. James the Great, St Lawrence and the Holy Cross - 's Herrgöttle von Biberbach
- Birenbach: Pilgrimage Church of the Dolorous Mother of God
- Birkenstein: pilgrimage chapel of St Mary of the Assumption
- Blieskastel: Holy Cross Chapel, Madonna with the Pfeilen
- Bogen: Bogenberg, St Mary of the Assumption
- Bonn: Kreuzbergkirche
- Bruchhausen (Landkreis Neuwied): Marian pilgrimage church of St. John the Baptist (Zuflucht der Sünder)
- Bussen (Upper Swabia): pilgrimage church of St. John the Baptist
- Cologne: Cologne Cathedral - SS. Peter and Mary (Epiphany)
- Cologne: St. Maria in der Kupfergasse (Black Madonna of Cologne)
- Dahenfeld: St Remigius' Church
- Deggendorf: Pilgrimage Church of the Holy Sepulchre
- Deggingen (Upper Filst valley): Ave Maria (pilgrimage church)
- Dettelbach: pilgrimage church of Maria im Sand
- Dießen am Ammersee: Marienmünster church in the district of Landsberg am Lech in Bavaria
- Düren: St Anne's Church - veneration of the "head of Anna" - a head relic of the mother of Mary
- Durmersheim: pilgrimage church of Maria Bickesheim
- Eckartshausen (Werneck): pilgrimage church of the Visitation of Mary
- Eggerode: pilgrimage church of Birth of the Virgin Mary
- Eibingen: pilgrimage church of St. Hildegard and St. John the Baptisth - burial church of Saint Hildegard and sanctuary for the Eibingen relic treasure.
- Ellwangen: pilgrimage church of St. Mary of Loreto
- Elmstein: pilgrimage church of the Mother of God
- Engelberg: St. Michael over the Main
- Ettal, (Upper Bavaria): Pilgrimage Church of St Mary of the Assumption
- Ettenberg (Marktschellenberg): Pilgrimage Church of the Visitation of Mary
- Etzelsbach, (Thüringen): Pilgrimage chapel of Etzelsbach
- Fahrenberg: pilgrimage to the Holy Hill of the Visitation of Mary
- Freystadt: pilgrimage church of Our Lady of Perpetual Help
- Friedberg: pilgrimage church of Herrgottsruh
- Fuchsmühl: pilgrimage church of Our Lady of Perpetual Help
- Fürstenfeldbruck: Fürstenfeld Abbey dedicated to the Assumption of the Blessed Virgin Mary (Mariä Himmelfahrt) in Bavaria
- Gößweinstein: Basilica, pilgrimage church and basilica of the Holy Trinity (Heilige Dreifaltigkeit)
- Gottsbüren (North Hesse)
- Haltern-Bergbossendorf: pilgrimage chapel of Saint Anne
- Hennef-Bödingen: Pilgrimage Church of the Dolorous Mother of God
- Herzfeld (Lippetal): pilgrimage church of St. Ida
- Hirschberg an der Bergstraße: pilgrimage church of St. John the Baptist
- Hohenpeißenberg: pilgrimage chapel and church on the Hoher Peißenberg
- Kälberau: pilgrimage church of Maria zum rauhen Wind
- Kevelaer: chapel of grace, candle chapel and St Mary's Basilica
- Kippenheim: pilgrimage chapel of Maria Frieden
- Klausen (Eifel): pilgrimage church of the Visitation of Mary
- Kleinenberg near Lichtenau in East Westphalia: pilgrimage chapel
- Koblenz-Arenberg: pilgrimage church of St. Nicholas with the Reverend Kraus' Assets (Landscape illustrated Bible)
- Koblenz-Lützel: pilgrimage church of Our Lady of Perpetual Help
- Kößlarn: Marian pilgrimage (Bavaria)
- Küblingen (Lower Saxony): Pilgrimage Church of St. Mary
- Lautenbach: Late Gothic pilgrimage church of Coronation of the Virgin
- Leipferdingen: pilgrimage church of St. Michael
- Leverkusen-Alkenrath: Gezelin Chapel
- Löffingen (Baden-Württemberg): Witterschneekreuz
- Ludwigshafen am Rhein-Oggersheim: castle and Pilgrimage Church of St Mary of the Assumption (Ludwigshafen) - pilgrimage to the holy house of Loreto, Marche, pilgrimage site for the Electorate of the Palatinate
- Lünen: St Mary's Church
- Marienberg (Burghausen)
- Maria Gern (Berchtesgaden): Pilgrimage Church of Maria Gern
- Mainz-Gonsenheim: Nothelfer Chapel
- Maria Steinbach: Pilgrimage Church of Maria Steinbach
- Marienheide: pilgrimage church of the Visitation of Mary
- Marienthal (Westerwald)
- Marienweiher (Marktleugast): pilgrimage basilica the Visitation of Mary
- Moosbronn: pilgrimage church Our Lady of Perpetual Help
- Mussenhausen: Our Dear Lady of Mount Carmel
- Neunburg vorm Wald: Mater Dolorosa (Ortsteil Katzdorf, Oberpfalz)
- Neuss: Quirinusmünster (1209-1230)
- Nußdorf am Inn (Bavaria): the Visitation of Mary (Kirchwald)
- Nothgottes: Abbey near Eibingen in Rheingau, pilgrimage to the Gnadenbild Nothgottes
- Oberfell: Pilgrimage Church of Bleidenberg and Pilgerstein, hilltop pilgrimage to Holy Trinity Church
- Ottersweier: pilgrimage church of Maria Linden
- Ottobeuren: SS. Alexander and Theodore
- Pfaffen-Schwabenheim: Stiftskirche (Pfaffen-Schwabenheim), pilgrimage to the Maria, Königin des Friedens, um 1750 aus dem Cologneer Karmel St. Maria vom Frieden (Cologne) geschenkt
- Planegg: Maria Eich Chapel
- Raitenbuch: St. Blasius
- Ramsau bei Berchtesgaden: Maria Kunterweg

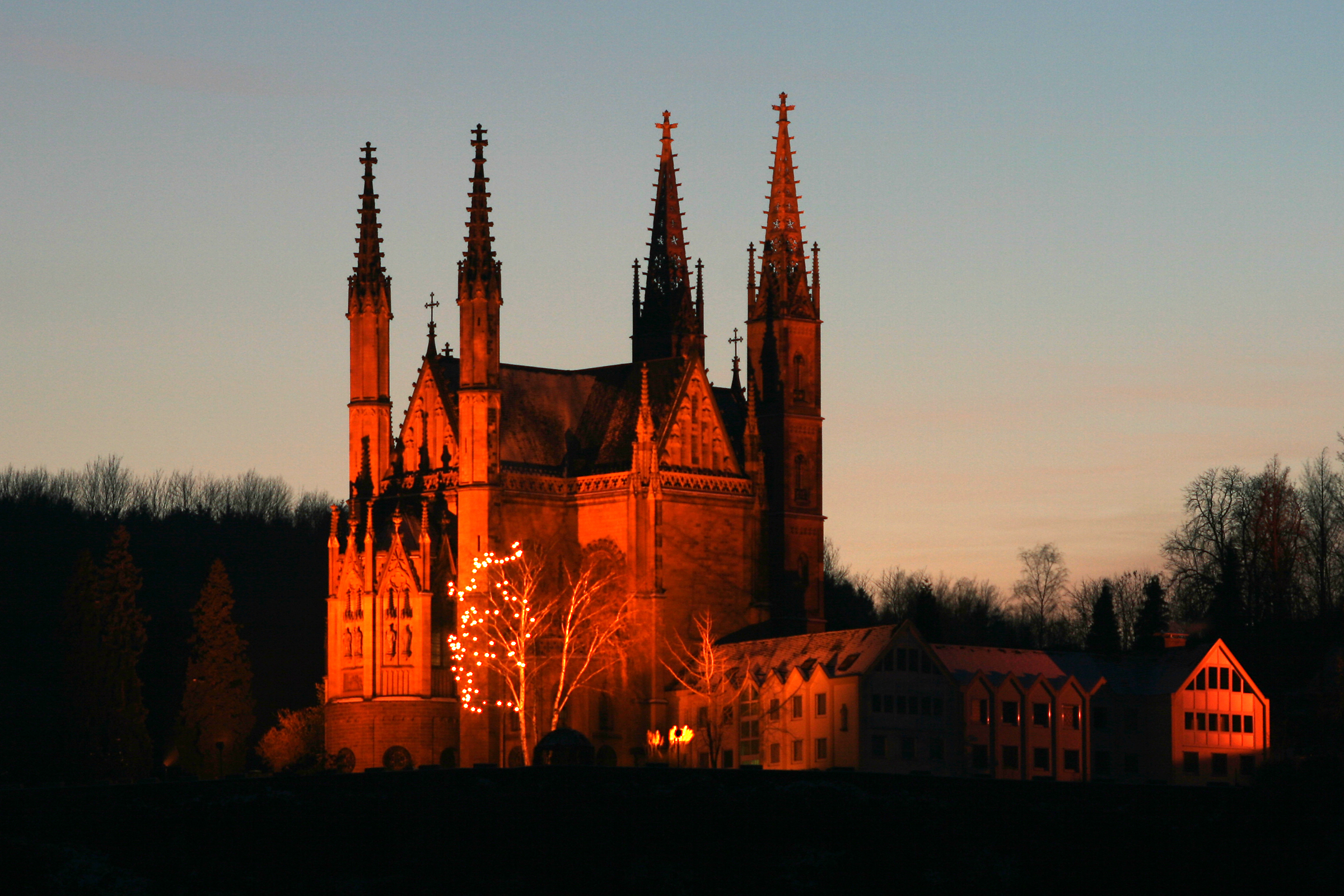
The Apollinaris Church in Remagen

- Rechberg near Schwäbisch Gmünd: St. Maria on the Hohenrechberg
- Regensburg: Alten Kapelle or Basilica of the Nativity of Our Lady Regensburg (Kollegiatstift unserer Lieben Frau zur alten Kapelle) in Regensburg in Bavaria
- Remagen: Apollinaris Church
- Rengersbrunn: Statue of the Mother of God
- Reuth bei Erbendorf: Pilgrimage Church of St Mary of the Assumption in the village of Premenreuth
- Rieste (Lower Saxony): pilgrimage church of St. John the Baptist on the Lage, pilgrimage to the Lage Cross
- Rohr: Braunau in Rohr Abbey dedicated to the Assumption of the Blessed Virgin Mary (Mariä Himmelfahrt) in Niederbayern in Bavaria
- Rütschenhausen: Pilgrimage Church of Maria von der Tann
- Rückers, county of Fulda: Roman Catholic Church of St Mary of the Assumption
- Saint Salvator (Rauenzell, Bavaria) formerly the oldest pilgrimage of the Diocese of Eichstätt
- Saint Bartholomew's: by the Königssee lake in Berchtesgaden Land
- Sandizell: St. Peter Church or Asamkirche Sandizell in Schrobenhausen in Bavaria
- Schmidmuehlen: Pilgrimage church of the Heiligen Dreifaltigkeit auf dem Kreuzberg
- Schönstatt (Vallendar): the Schoenstatt Shrine is an ancient shrine of the Schoenstatt Movement
- Schongau: pilgrimage church of St Mary of the Assumption
- Schwäbisch Gmünd: pilgrimage church of St. Salvator
- Schwandorf: Pilgrimage Church of Our Dear Lady of Kreuzberg
- Scheßlitz: pilgrimage church of Gügel
- Spaichingen: pilgrimage church on the Dreifaltigkeitsberg
- Spabrücken: pilgrimage church of the Black Madonna of Soon
- Bad Staffelstein: Pilgrimage Basilica of the Fourteen Holy Helpers
- Steingaden: Steingaden Abbey in Bavaria, Germany
- Steinhausen: Steinhausen pilgrimage church
- Sulzbach-Rosenberg (Upper Palatinate): Pilgrimage Church of Annaberg
- Swisttal-Buschhoven: Marian pilgrimage site with the "Rosa Mystica"
- Todtmoos (Black Forest): pilgrimage church of Our Dear Lady of Todtmoos

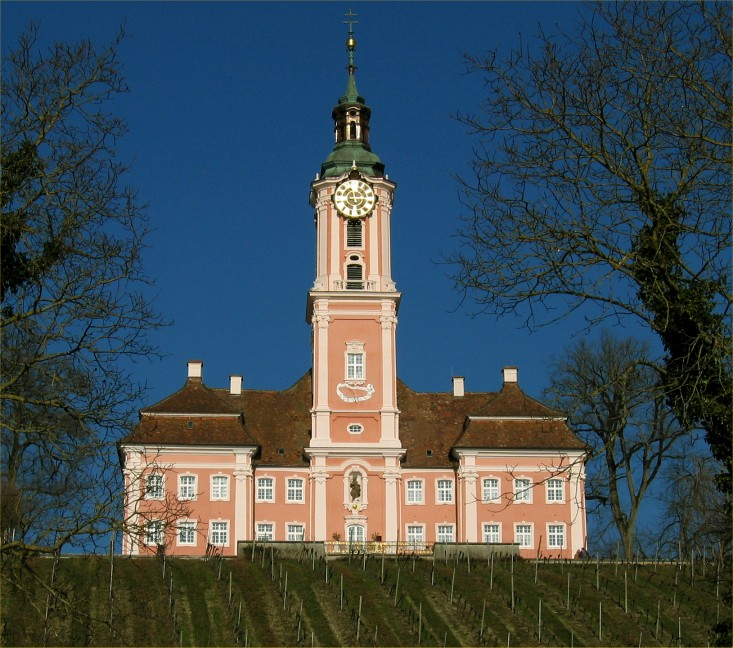
The Pilgrimage Church of Birnau by Lake Constance

- Tuntenhausen: Papal Basilica St Mary of the Assumption
- Uhldingen-Mühlhofen: Pilgrimage Church of Birnau
- Unterkochen: Marian pilgrimage church of Unterkochen

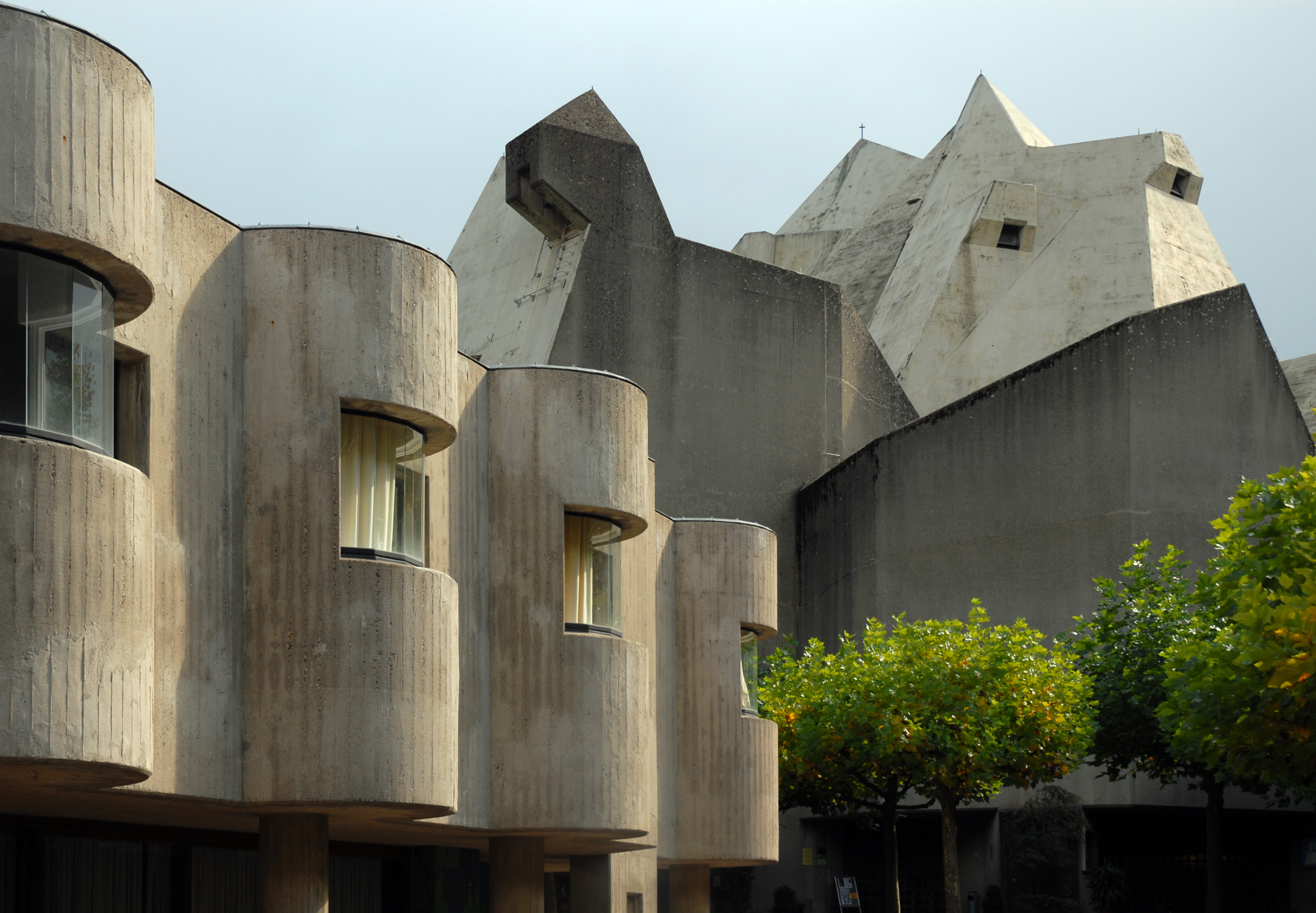
Maria, Königin des Friedens, Neviges

- Velbert-Neviges: Maria, Königin des Friedens (Mary, Queen of Peace)
- Vierzehnheiligen: Basilica of the Fourteen Holy Helpers
- Vilgertshofen: pilgrimage church of the Dolorous Mother of God
- Volkach: pilgrimage church of Kirchberg, Maria im Weingarten
- Waghäusel: Marian pilgrimage church
- Waldsassen: Holy Trinity Church
- Walldürn: Pilgrimage Church of the Holy Blood (Blood miracle of Walldürn)
- Weihenlinden: pilgrimage church of the Holy Trinity
- Weiler in den Bergen (near Schwäbisch Gmünd): St. Bernhard's on the Bernhardusberg hill
- Weingarten: Weingarten Abbey or St. Martin’s Abbey is a Benedictine monastery on the Martinsberg near Ravensburg at Baden-Württemberg
- Weltenburg: Weltenburg Abbey near Kelheim in Bavaria
- Wemding: pilgrimage church of Maria Brünnlein
- Werl: Pilgrimage Basilica, dedicated to the Visitation
  - Old Pilgrimage Church, dedicated to Mary
- Wieskirche: Pilgrimage Church of the Scourged Saviour on the Wies in Steingaden in Bavaria designed by the brothers Johann Baptist and Domenikus Zimmermann
- Willich-Neersen: Little Jerusalem Church
- Bad Wilsnack: St. Nicholas' and the Holy Blood of Wilsnack
- Würzburg: pilgrimage church of the Visitation of Mary Käppele
- Xanten: pilgrimage church of St. St Mary of the Assumption
- Zell am Harmersbach: Pilgrimage Church of Maria zu den Ketten in the village of Unterharmersbach
- Zwiefalten: Pilgrimage Church of the Minster of Our Dear Lady

=== Gibraltar ===
- Shrine of Our Lady of Europe

=== Great Britain ===
- Walsingham: Anglican and Roman Catholic shrine of Our Lady of Walsingham

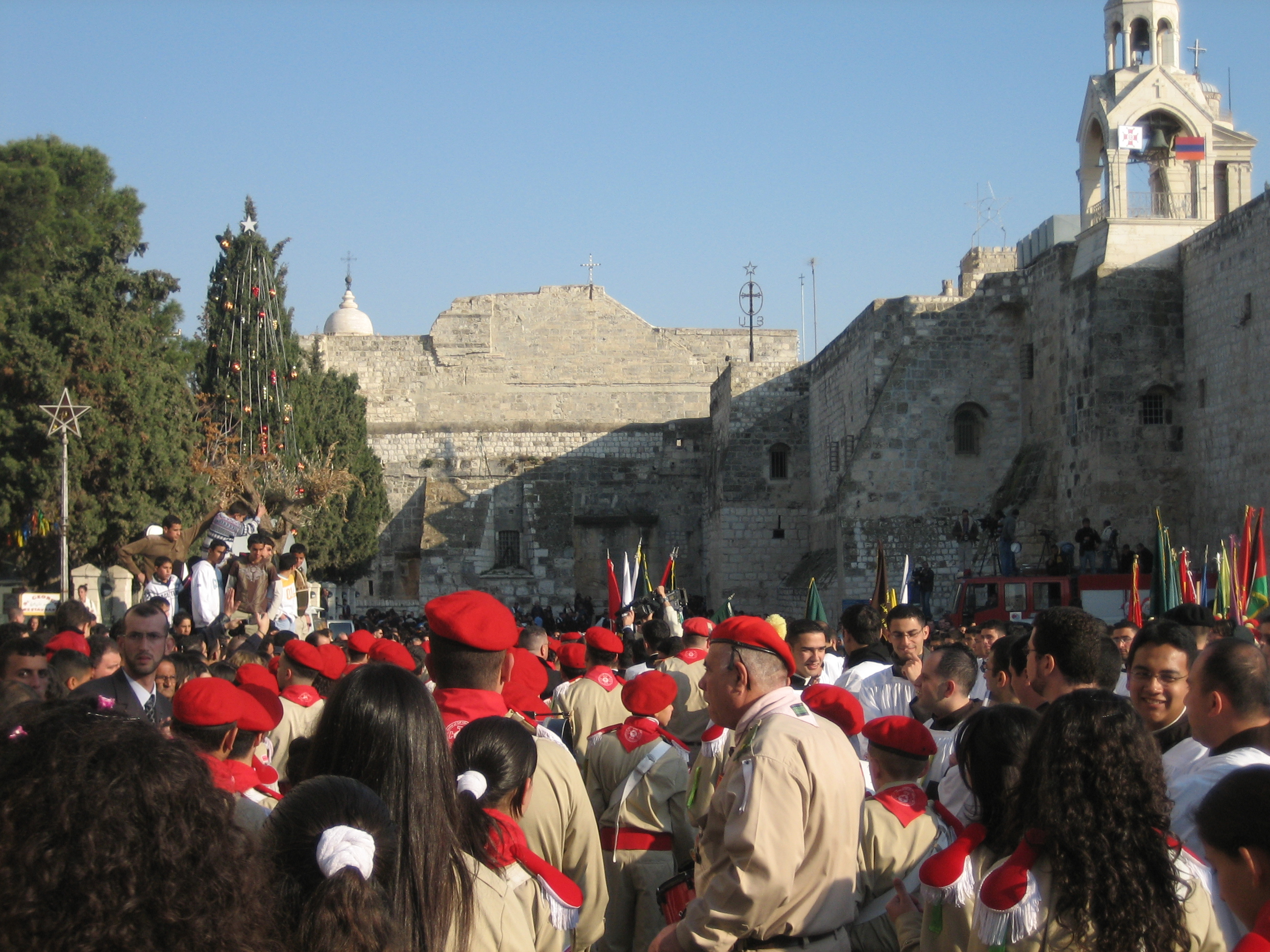
Palestinian Christian Scouts outside the Church of the Nativity, Palestine

=== Holy Land ===
- Bethlehem: Church of the Nativity
- Jerusalem: Church of the Holy Sepulchre
- Jericho: Mount of Temptation
- Nazareth: Basilica of the Annunciation
- Sea of Galilee: Church of the Primacy of Saint Peter (also known as the Church of the Multiplication of the Loaves and Fishes)
- Mount Carmel: Stella Maris Monastery (also known as the Monastery of Our Lady of Mount Carmel)

=== Ireland ===
- Knock: Marian pilgrimage chapel of Our Lady Queen of Ireland
- Station Island, Lough Derg: St. Patrick’s Basilica

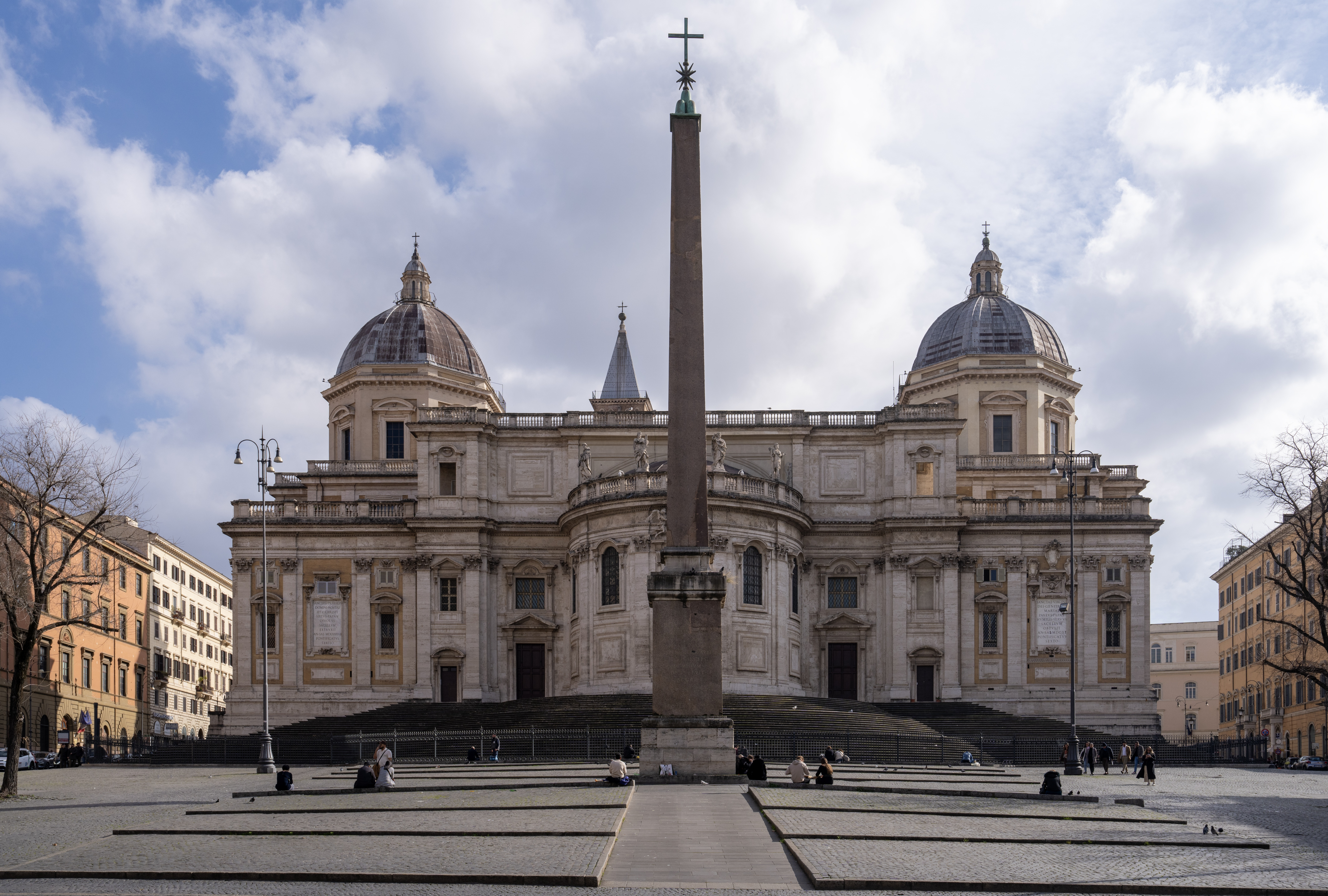
Santa Maria Maggiore in Rome

=== Italy ===
- Amalfi: relics of saint Andrew
- Assisi: papal basilica of saint Francis
- Badia: Holy Cross Church
- Benevento: relics of saint Bartholomew the Apostle
- Loreto, Marche: Basilica della Santa Casa with Black Madonna
- Manoppello: Volto Santo (Holy Face), i.e. shroud of Jesus or Veil of Veronica
- Monte Cassino: the first monastery of Benedictine monks
- Ortona: relics of saint Thomas the Apostle
- Padua: sanctuary of saint Anthony
- Pompei: Shrine of the Virgin of the Rosary of Pompei
- Re: Madonna del Sangue in the Valle Vigezzo (Vigezzotal)
- Vatican: Saint Peter's tomb, Holy Lance, grave of John Paul II and many others
- papal basilica Santa Maria Maggiore in Rome: icon of Salus Populi Romani
- papal basilica Santa Croce in Gerusalemme: part of True Cross with Titulus Crucis and Holy Nails
- papal basilica San Giovanni in Laterano: Scala Santa (stairs from the palace of Pilate)
- basilica minor Santa Prassede: pillar upon which Jesus was flogged
- Salerno: relics of saint Matthew
- Savona: Nostra Signora di Misericordia
- Tirano: Madonna di Tirano
- Turin: Shroud of Turin in the cathedral
- Varese: Madonna del Monte
- Venice: relics of saint Mark
- Vicenza: Madonna del Monte Berico
- Viterbo: Madonna della Quercia

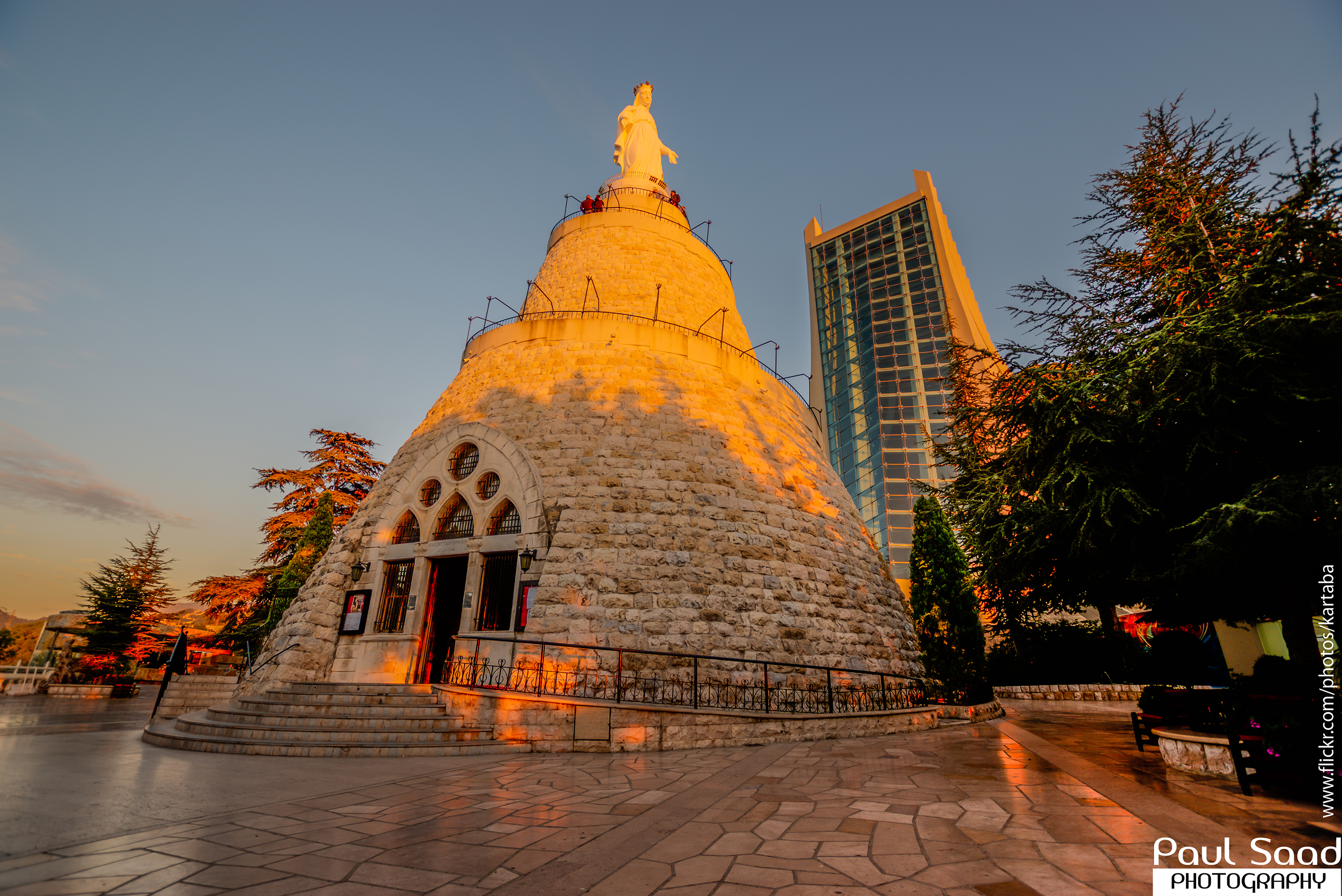
Our Lady of Lebanon

=== Lebanon ===
- Our Lady of Lebanon (Harissa, Keserwan District)
- Monastery of Qozhaya (Wadi Qozhaya, Zgharta District)
- Monastery of Saint Maron (Annaya, Byblos District) - Sanctuary of Saint Charbel
- Monastery of Saint Joseph (Jrabta, Batroun District) - Sanctuary of Saint Rafqa
- Monastery of Saints Cyprian and Justina (Kfifan, Batroun District) - Sanctuary of Saint Nimatullah
- Qana Al Jaleel (Qana, Tyre District), where it is believed that Jesus Christ performed His first miracle, transforming water into wine at the Marriage at Cana.

=== Latvia ===
- Basilica of the Assumption (Aglona)

=== Lithuania ===
- Gate of Dawn (Vilnius): Marian sanctuary
- Divine Mercy Sanctuary (Vilnius): the first Divine Mercy image

=== Mexico ===
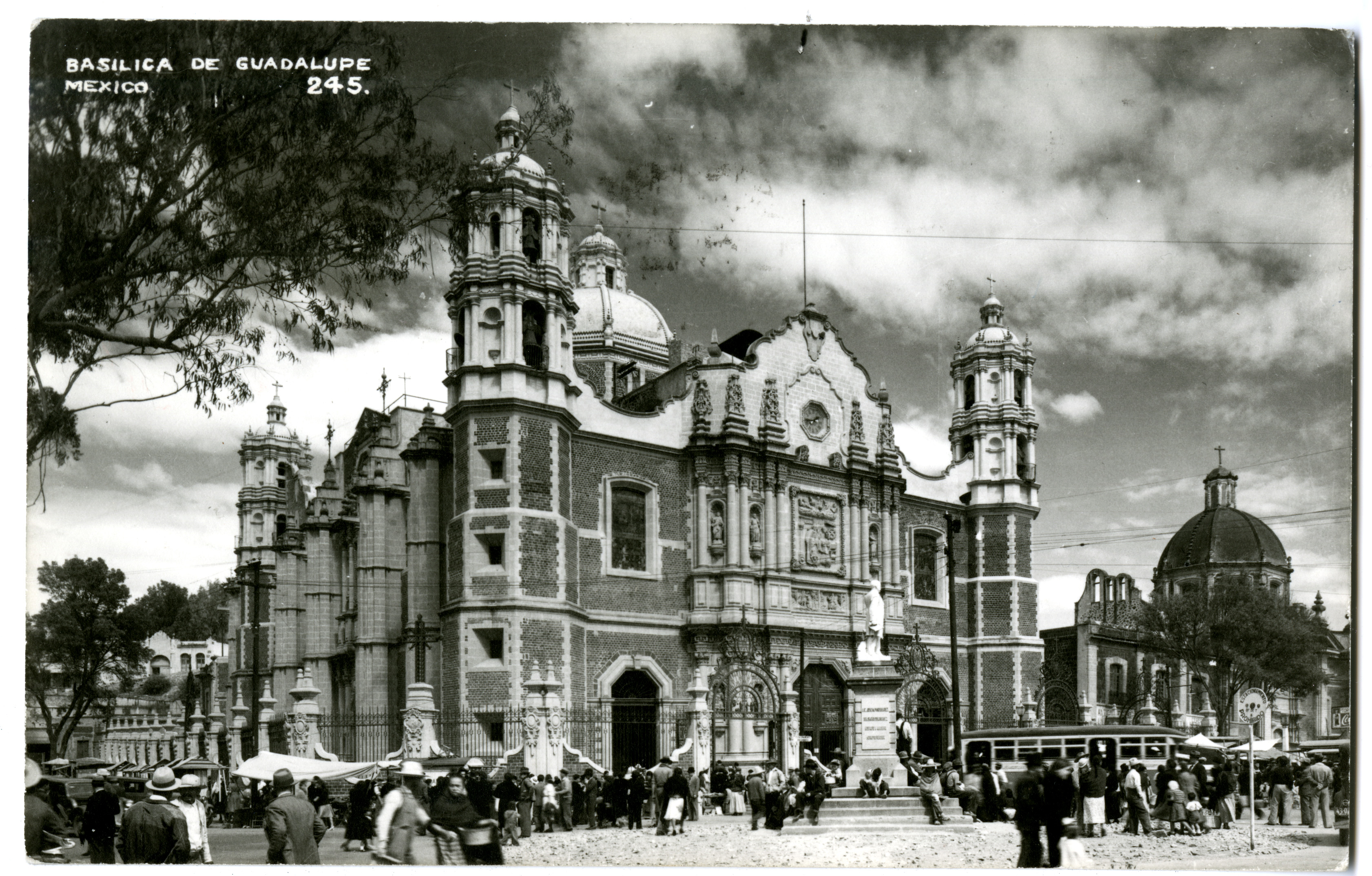
Guadalupe Basilica postcard. University of Dayton Libraries.

- Basilica of Our Lady of Guadalupe: very popular place of Marian apparitions

=== Netherlands ===
- Warfhuizen: Our Lady of the Enclosed Garden

=== Philippines ===
- National Shrine of The Divine Mercy, Philippines: dedicated to Divine Mercy
- Divine Mercy Shrine (Misamis Oriental): statue of merciful Jesus
- Simala Shrine: Sibonga Monastery of the Holy Eucharist in Cebu

=== Poland ===
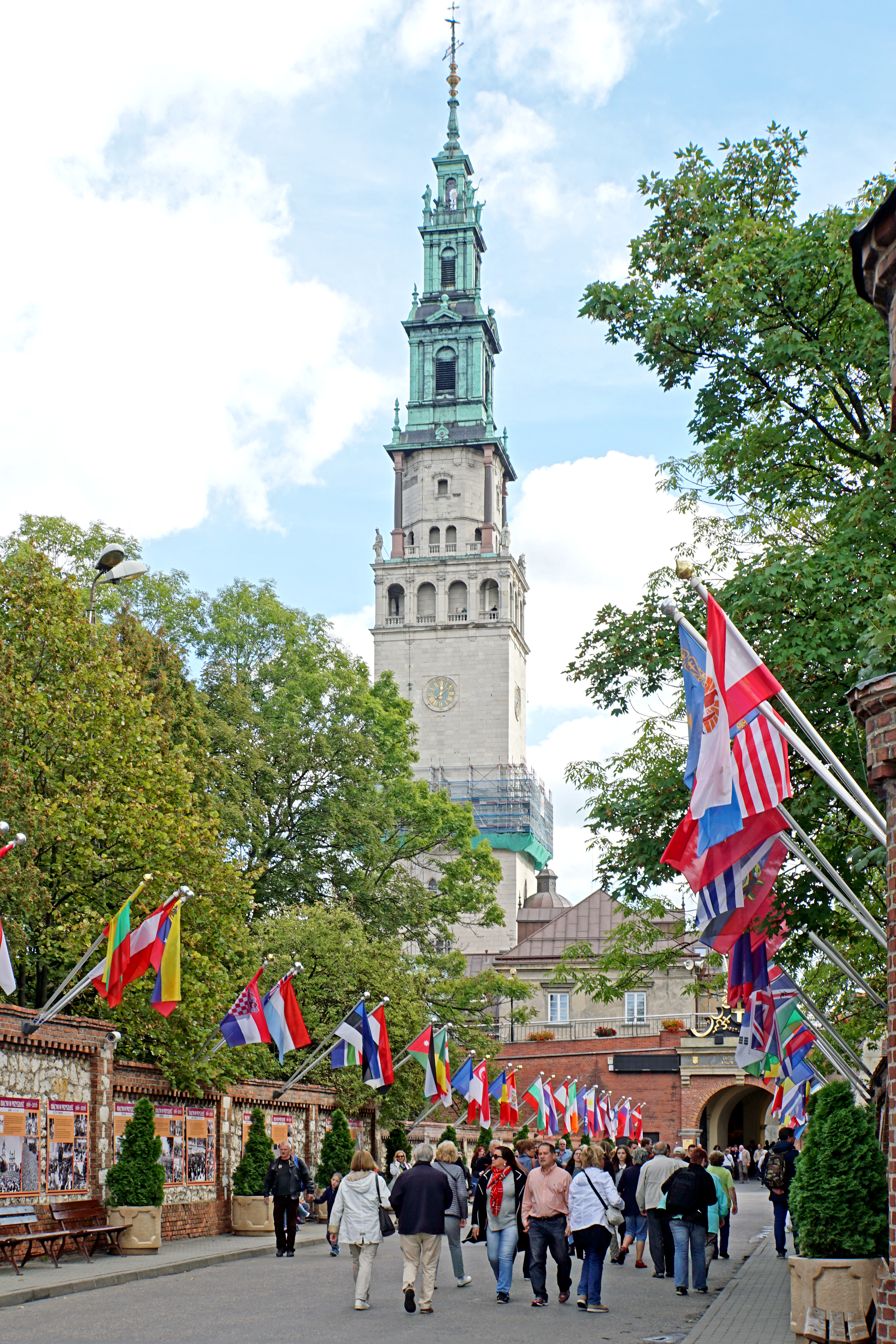
Jasna Góra in Częstochowa

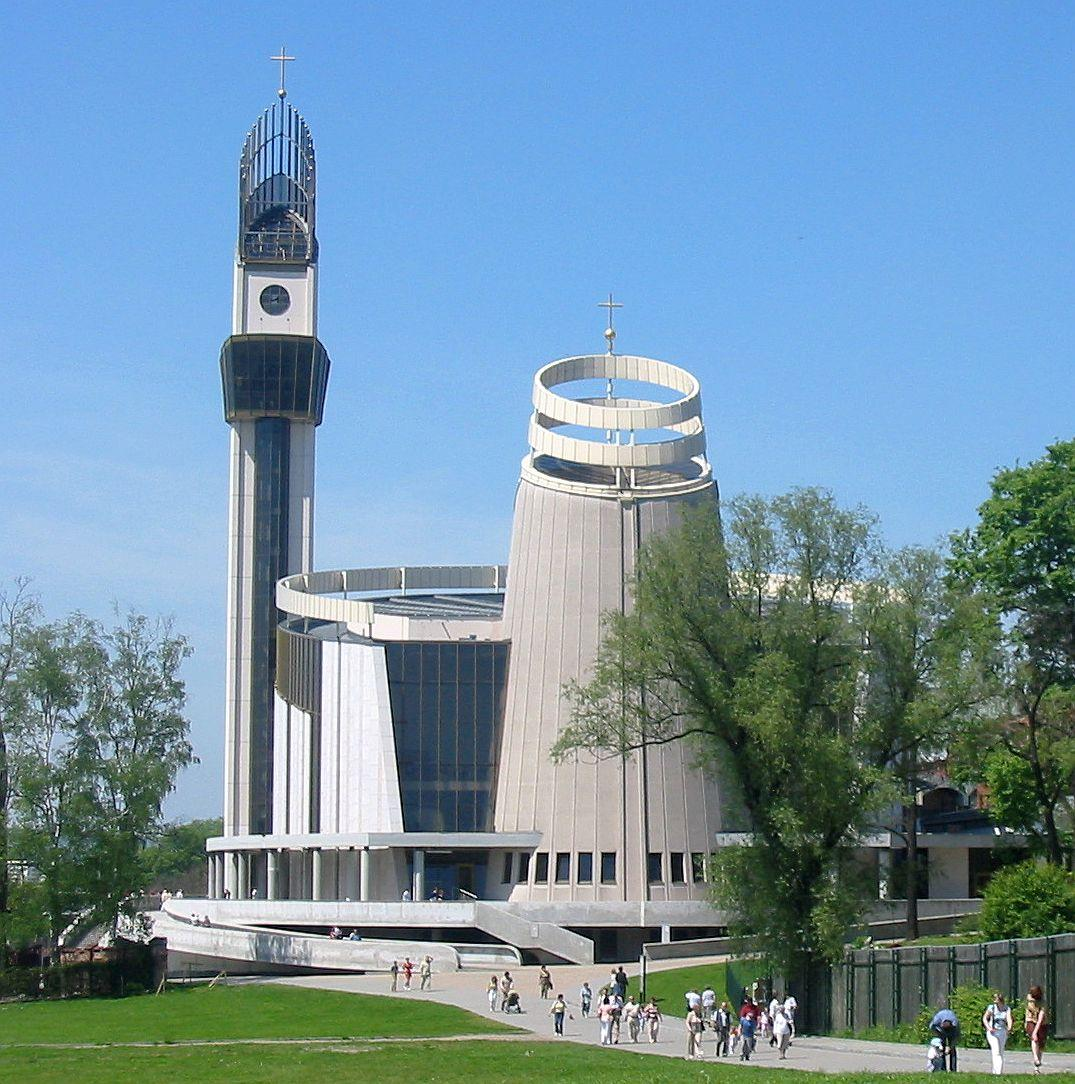
Divine Mercy Sanctuary (Kraków), also known as Łagiewniki

- Góra Świętej Anny: pilgrimage to the Saint Anna (in Śląsk Opolski)
- Bardo: pilgrimage church of the Visitation of Mary (in Dolny Śląsk)
- Divine Mercy Sanctuary (Białystok): with the grave of blessed Michał Sopoćko
- Częstochowa: the most popular (4,000,000 a year) Polish pilgrimage church at Jasna Góra with the miraculous image of the Black Madonna of Częstochowa
- Gidle near Częstochowa: Marian sanctuary
- Gietrzwałd (Warmian-Masurian Voivodeship): Marian pilgrimage in the site of apparitions
- Głogowiec and Świnice Warckie: the place of birth and baptism of saint Faustina Kowalska
- Gniezno Cathedral: with the grave of St. Adalbert of Prague (Św. Wojciech), a major patron of Poland
- Gostyń in Greater Poland: Marian sanctuary
- Góra Kalwaria in Mazovia: calvary
- Kalisz: sanctuary of saint Joseph
- Kalwaria Pacławska near Przemyśl: calvary
- Kalwaria Zebrzydowska near Kraków: calvary
- Kałków-Godów near Kielce: Marian sanctuary
- Kodeń at the Bug river: Marian sanctuary
- Kraków: Wawel Cathedral with the grave of queen Jadwiga of Poland (Królowa Jadwiga)
- Skałka in Kraków: sanctuary of Saint Stanislaus of Szczepanów, a major patron of Poland
- Divine Mercy Sanctuary (Kraków) also known as Łagiewniki: world center of the Divine Mercy devotion with the grave of saint Faustina Kowalska and the most popular version of Divine Mercy image (near by the Center of John Paul II)
- Ludźmierz: pilgrimage church with the Mother of God as Queen (Gaździna) of Podhale
- Licheń Stary near Konin: very popular new Basilica of Our Lady of Licheń in the site of an apparition
- Łobżenica-Górka Klasztorna in Krajna: the site of Marian apparitions
- Niepokalanów in Mazovia: sanctuary of the Immaculata as well as saint Maksymilian Kolbe
- Pakość near Inowrocław: calvary
- Piekary Śląskie: the main Marian sanctuary of Górny Śląsk
- Divine Mercy Sanctuary (Płock): the site of the first apparition of Divine Mercy image to saint Faustina Kowalska
- Rokitno in Lubusz Voivodeship: Marian sanctuary
- Skrzatusz near Piła: Marian sanctuary
- Studzianna near Radom: Marian sanctuary
- Święta Lipka (Warmian-Masurian Voivodeship): pilgrimage to Our Lady of Holy Linden in the site of apparitions
- Święty Krzyż near Kielce: sanctuary of the Holy Cross, in the past the biggest in Poland
- Wadowice near Kraków: the place of birth of John Paul II
- Wambierzyce near Kłodzko: Marian pilgrimage and calvary
- Warsaw: St. Andrew Bobola sanctuary
- Temple of Divine Providence in Warsaw: national sanctuary
- St. Stanislaus Kostka Church, Warsaw: the grave of blessed Jerzy Popiełuszko
- Wejherowo in Kaszuby: calvary

=== Portugal ===
- Fátima: important Marian pilgrimage site
- Nazaré: Nossa Senhora da Nazaré (Our Dear Lady of Nazareth)

=== Slovakia ===
- Šaštín-Stráže: Basilica of the Seven Sorrows of St. Mary, Šaštín
- Marianka: Church of the Birth of the Virgin Mary
- Turzovka

=== Spain ===
- Cathedral of Santiago de Compostela

=== Switzerland ===
- Einsiedeln (Schwyz): Black Madonna
- Locarno (Tessin): pilgrimage church of Madonna del Sasso
- Ziteil (Graubünden): pilgrimage church auf 2,429 m above the sea
- Luthern Bad (Lucerne): pilgrimage church of Maria-Heilbronn

=== Turkey ===
- House of the Virgin Mary, near Ephesos

=== Syria ===
- Umayyad Mosque (Damascus): Current day Mosque, burial place of John the Baptist's head

== See also ==
- Christian pilgrimage
- List of Christian pilgrimage sites
- New Testament places associated with Jesus
