= Basilica of Notre-Dame, Marienthal =

Basilica of Notre-Dame, Marienthal Basilique Notre-Dame de Marienthal
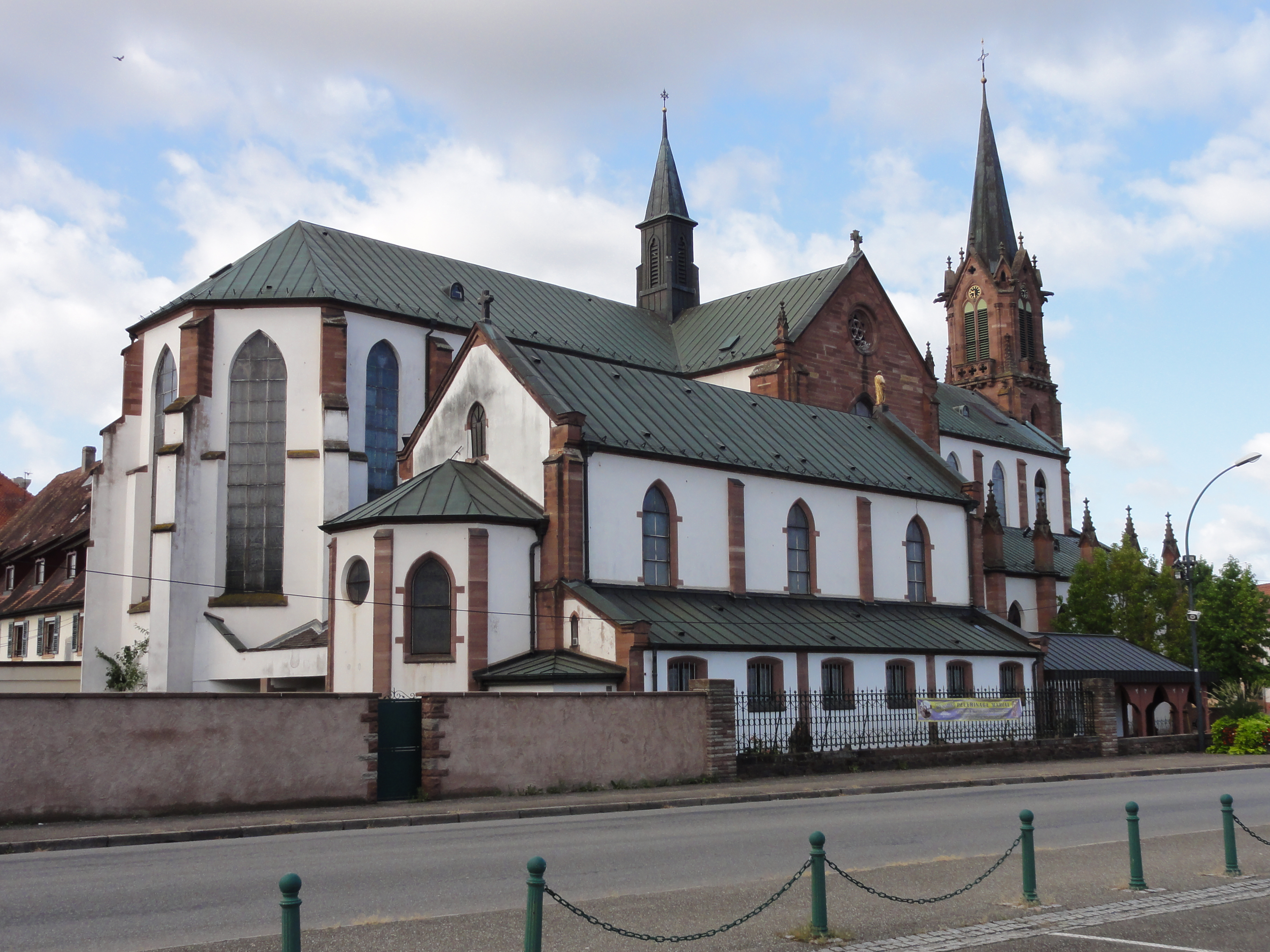
- Basilica of Notre-Dame, Marienthal; Basilique Notre-Dame de Marienthal
- 48°46′46.24″N 7°49′01.23″E
- Location: Haguenau
- Country: France
- Denomination: Catholic
- Website: http://basiliquemarienthal.fr/

History
- Status: Minor basilica (since 1892)
- Founded: 1250
- Founder: Albert of Haguenau
- Dedication: Mary, mother of Jesus

Architecture
- Functional status: Pilgrimage church
- Architectural type: basilica
- Style: Gothic; Gothic Revival
- Groundbreaking: 1863
- Completed: 1866

Administration
- Archdiocese: Archdiocese of Strasbourg
- Parish: paroisse Saint Joseph de Marienthal

The Basilica of Notre-Dame, Marienthal (French: Basilique Notre-Dame de Marienthal), is a Roman Catholic pilgrimage church dedicated to the Blessed Virgin Mary. Located in Marienthal, in the Bas-Rhin department of France, it is administratively situated in the town of Haguenau.

Pope Pius IX crowned the dolorous Marian image, enshrined within the basilica, on 19 September 1859. Pope Leo XIII elevated the status of the shrine to Minor basilica on 31 May 1892.

The first sanctuary at this site was built around 1250 by the knight Albert of Haguenau (died in 1254), who had had a religious epiphany some ten years prior and had gathered a small community of faithful around him. This first sanctuary, called "Mary in the Valley", venerated a statue of the Madonna and Child which is not preserved today. The two statues that are venerated today, a Madonna and Child and a Pietà, date from the early 15th century. In the 18th century, the basilica also received precious gifts from queen consort Marie Leszczyńska.

The current, spacious church was built in 1863–1866 in the Gothic Revival style, but keeps a Late Gothic sacristy from 1519, decorated with early Renaissance bosses, and elaborate works of art such as a Dormition of Virgin Mary, and an Entombment of Christ, carved in sandstone by the local master sculptor, Friedrich Hammer (also known as Fritz Hammer, or Frédéric Hammer). Among the 19th-century works of art in the basilica figures a set of frescoes by Martin von Feuerstein (1889).

== Gallery ==
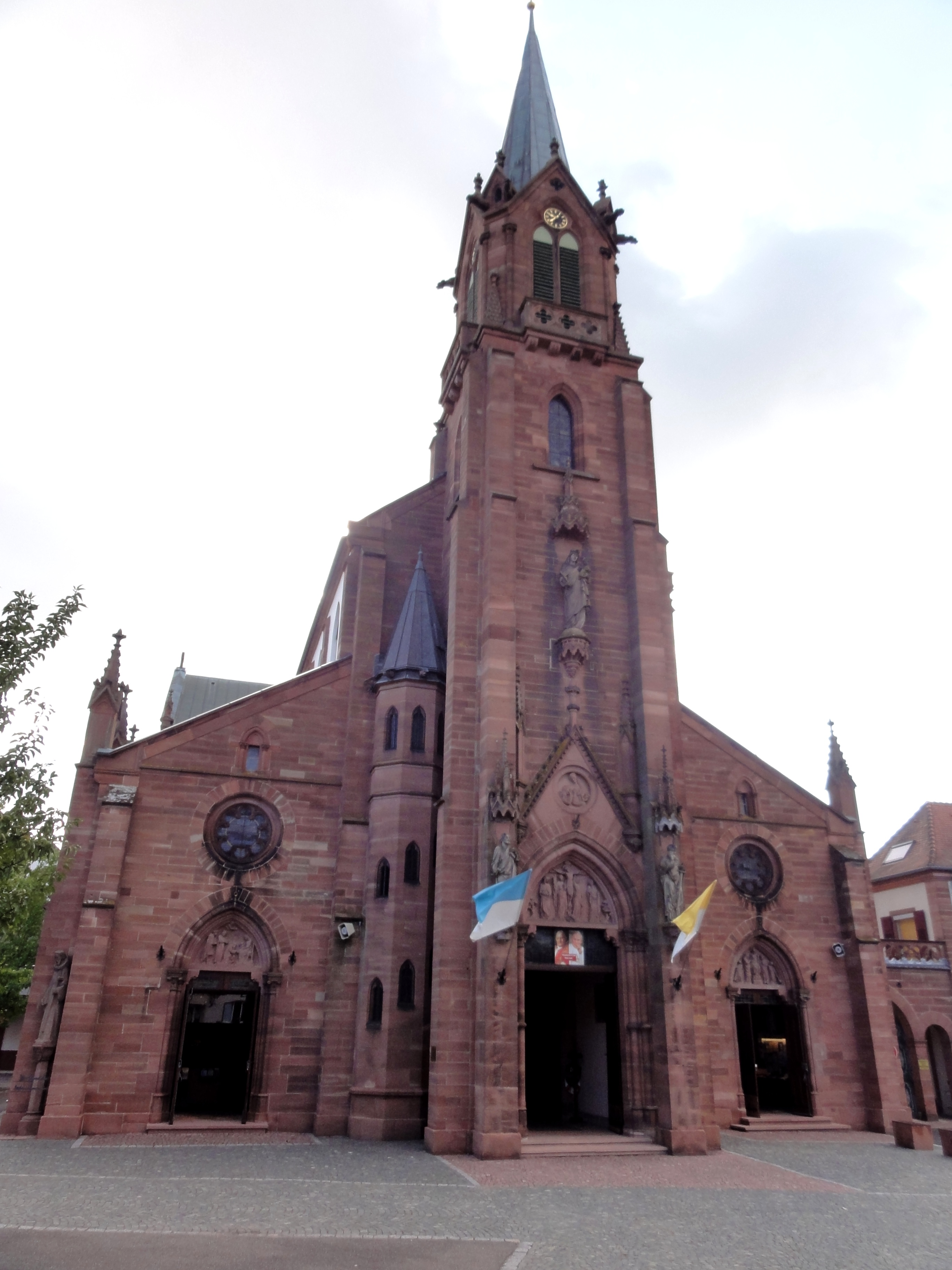
West facade

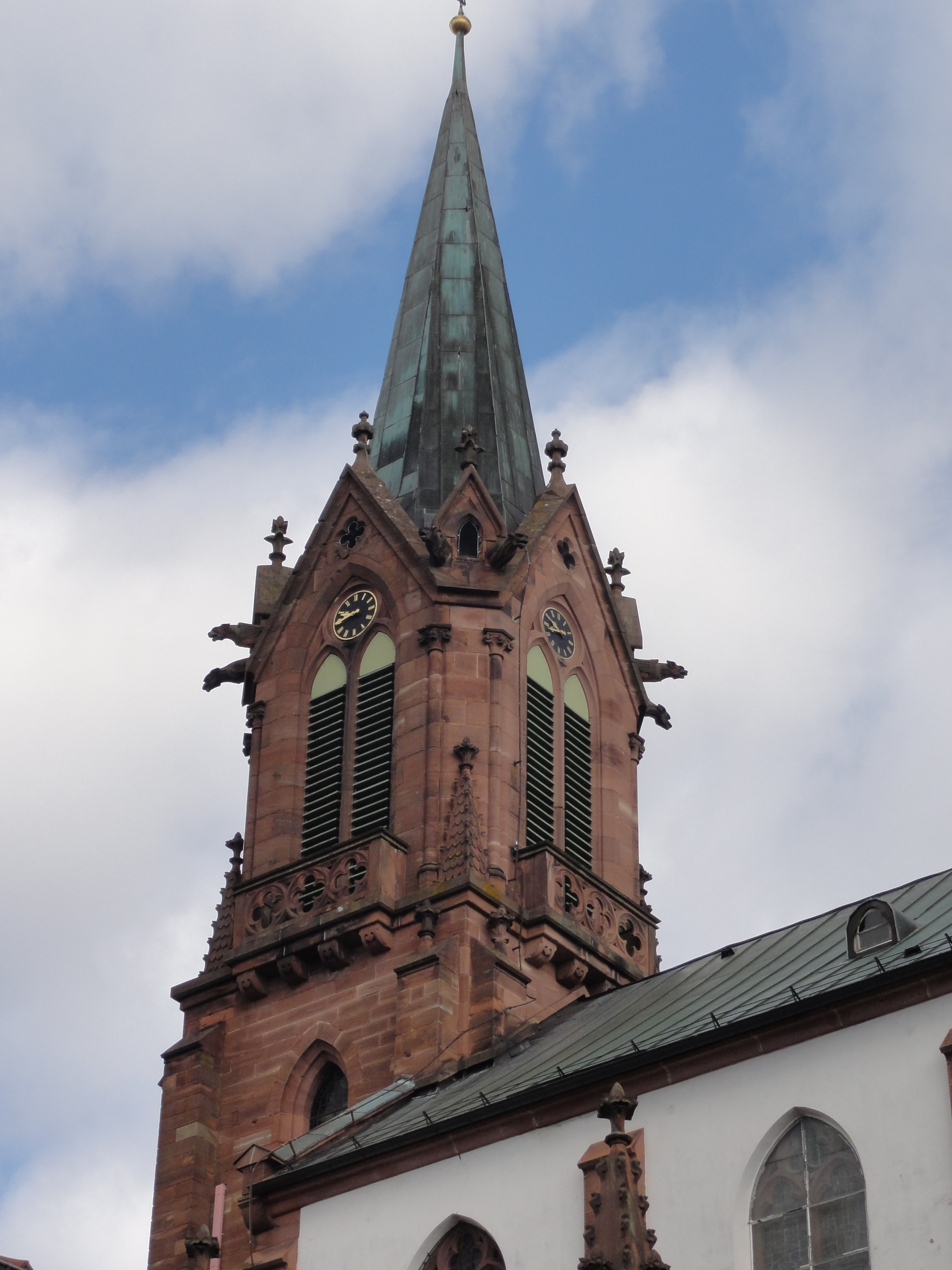
Steeple

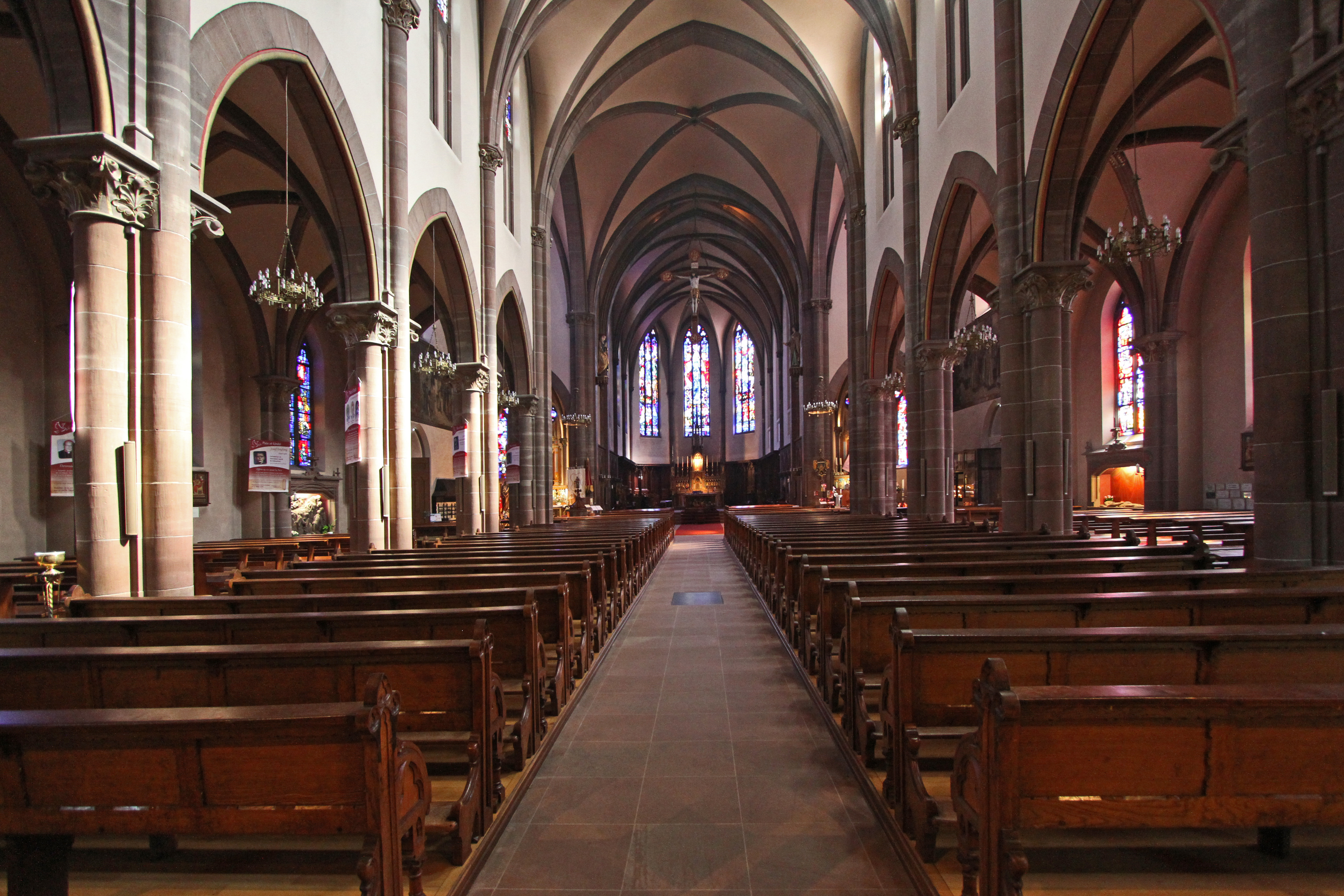
Interior, looking east

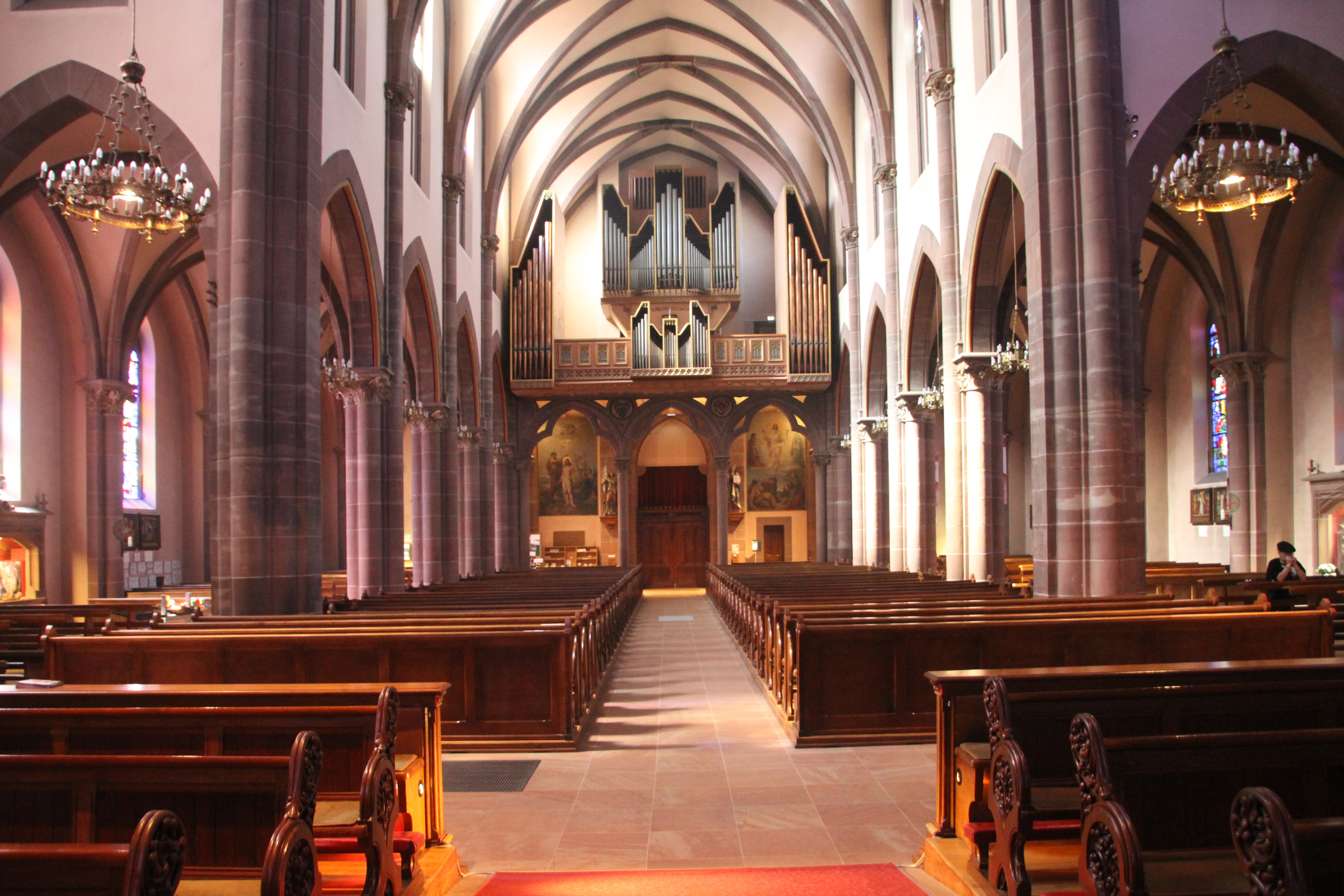
Interior, looking west

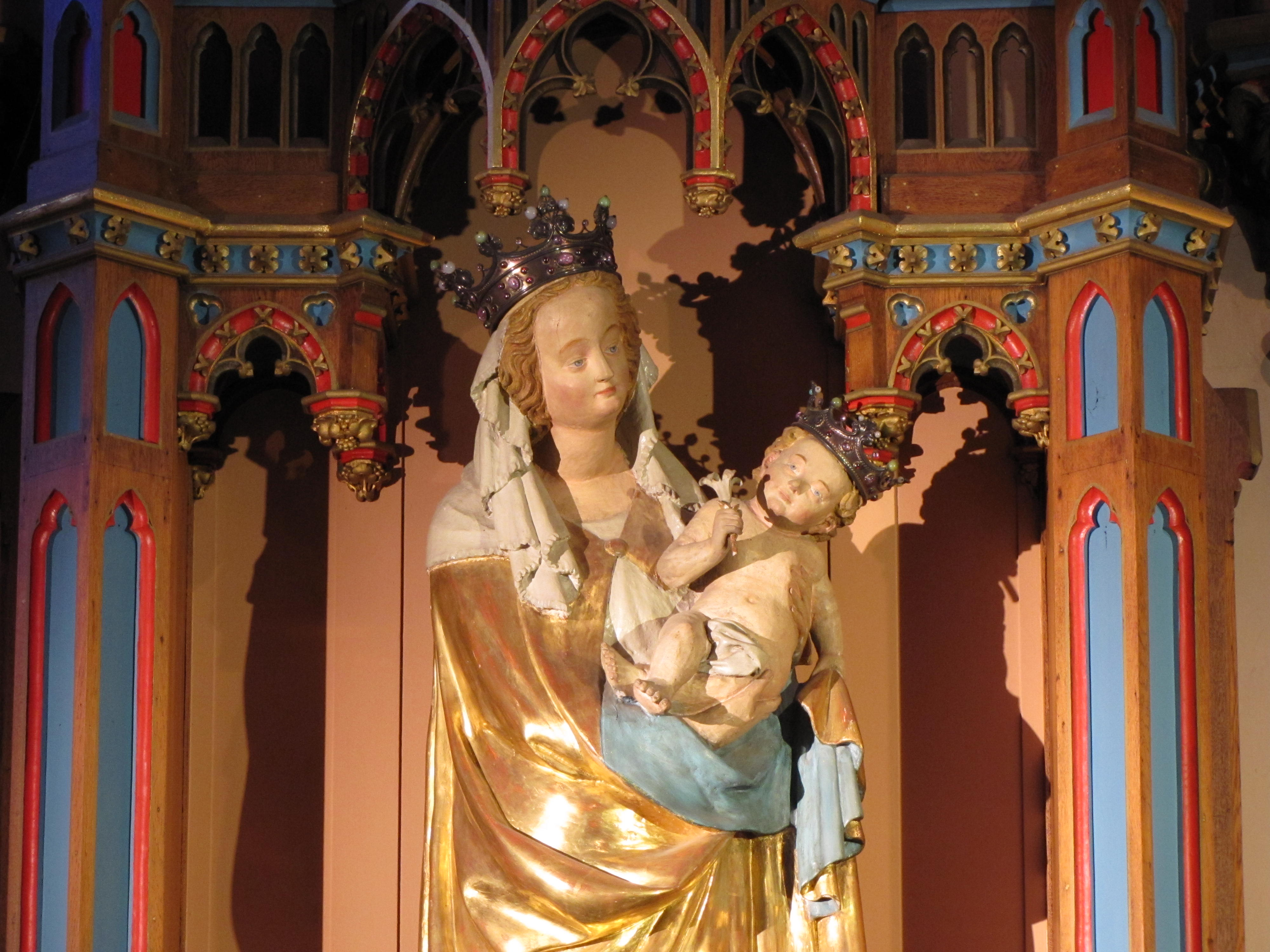
Madonna and Child

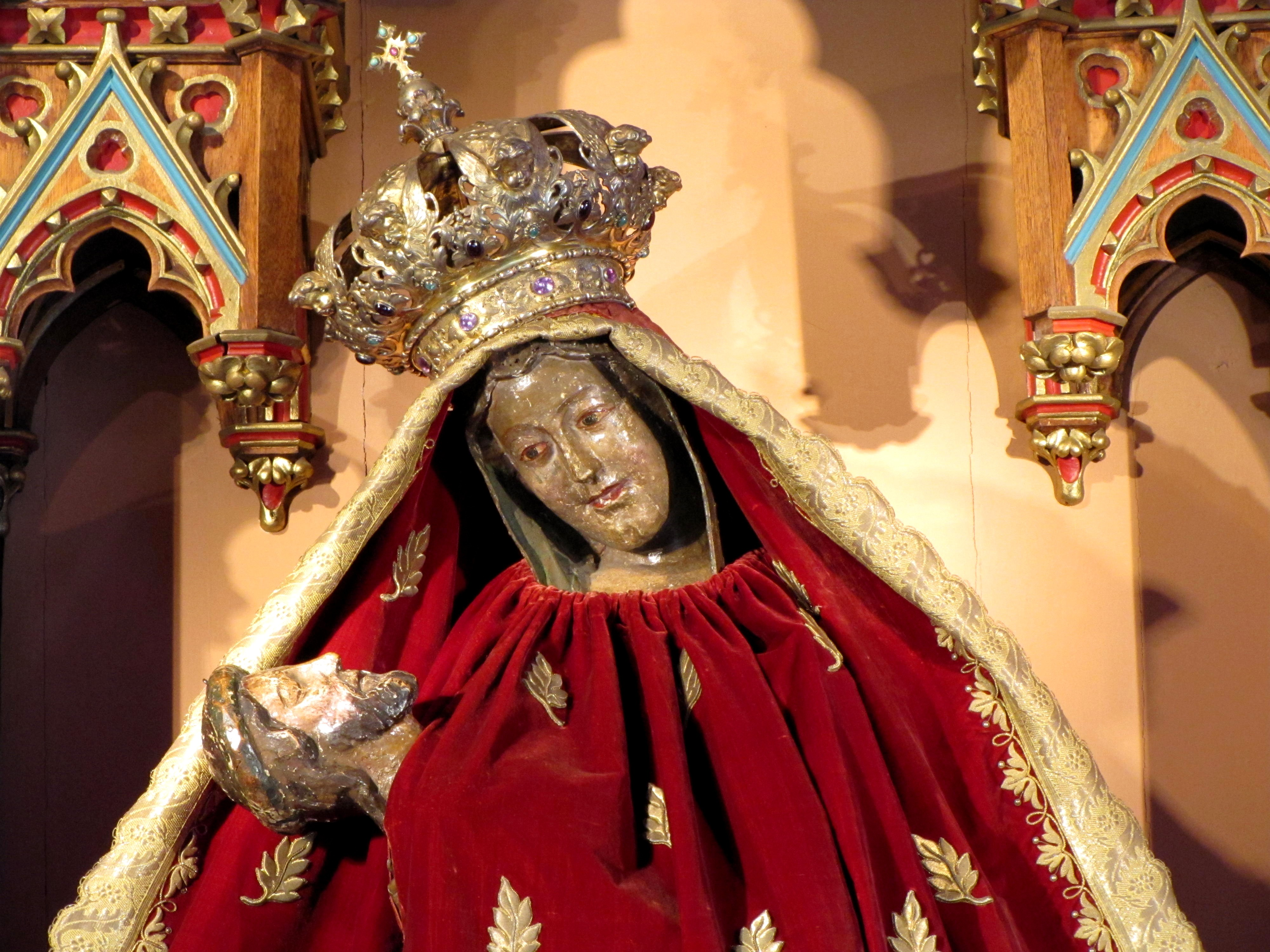
Pietà (Canonically Crowned, 19 September 1859, PP. Pius IX)

== See also ==
- List of Jesuit sites
