= St. Maria in der Kupfergasse =

Church building in Cologne, Germany

Coordinates: 50°56′23″N 6°57′1″E

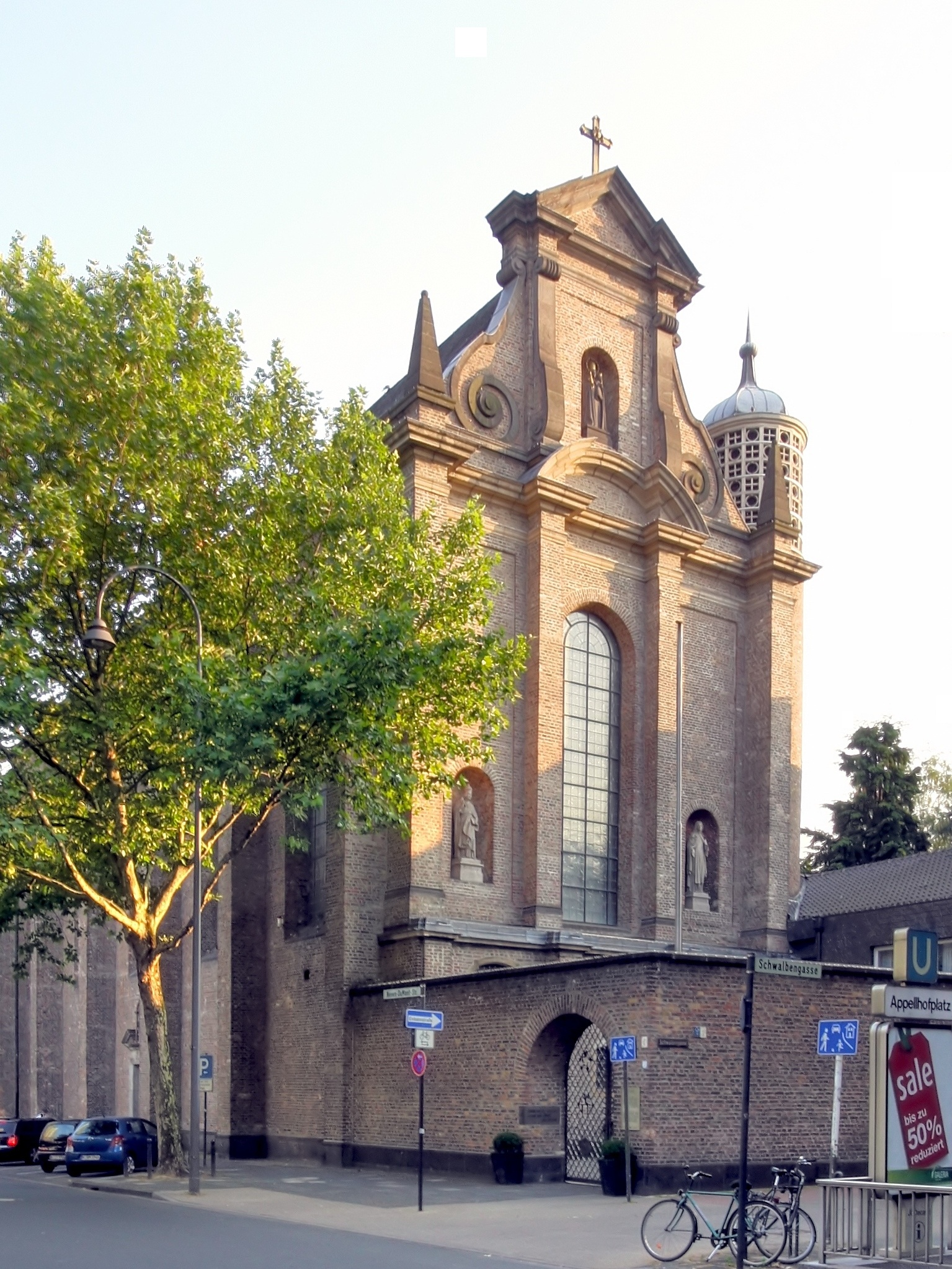
North elevation of St. Maria in der Kupfergasse in 2010

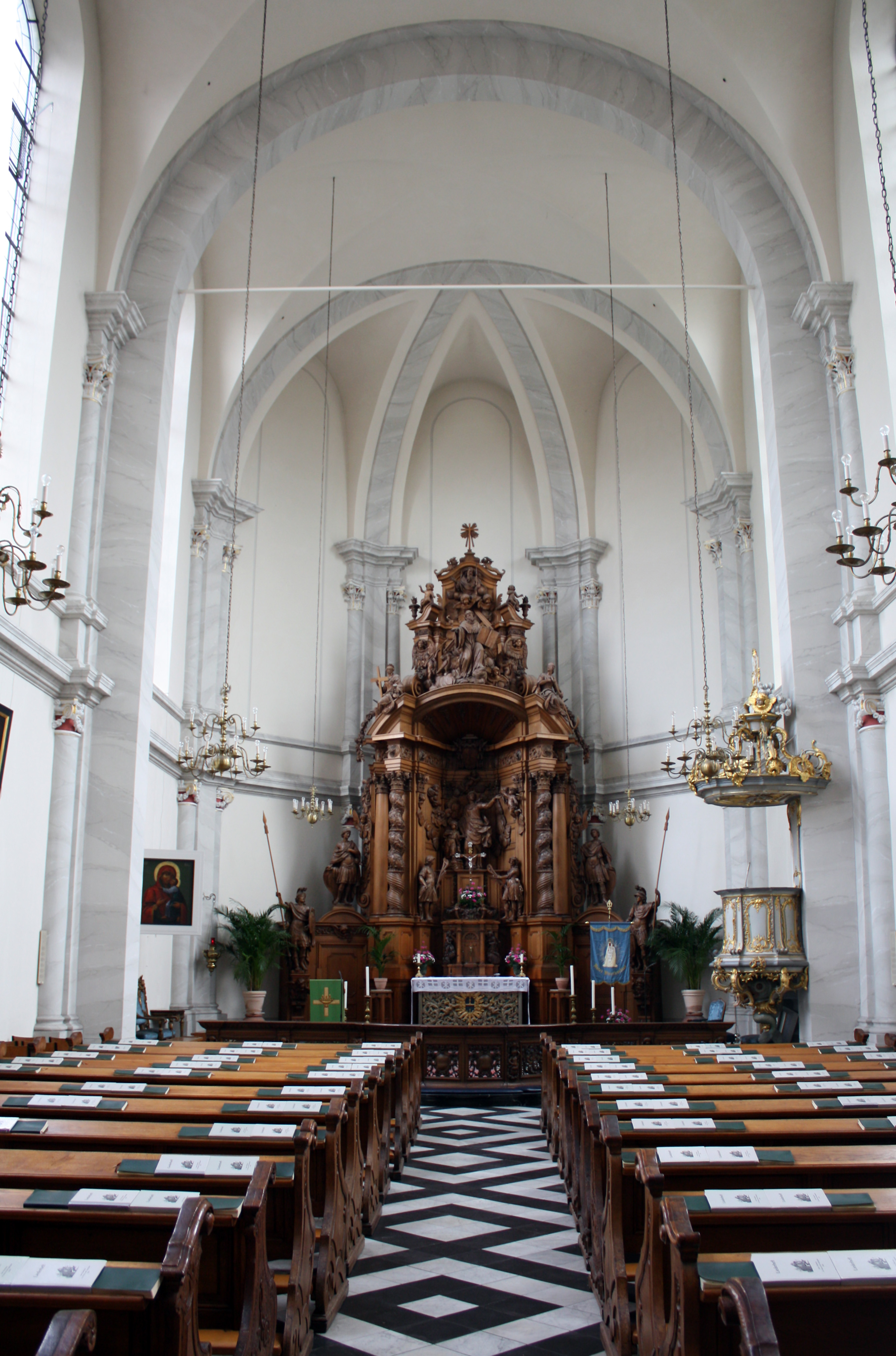
church interior in 2008

St. Maria in der Kupfergasse is a Baroque church in Cologne, western Germany, in the district of Innenstadt. The pilgrimage church is dedicated to St. Mary, the Black Madonna. It was completed in 1715 and measures 37.20 meters in length and 17.30 metres in width.

== See also ==
- List of Baroque architecture

== Sources ==
- Manfred Becker-Huberti, Günter A. Menne: Kölner Kirchen, die Kirchen der katholischen und evangelischen Gemeinden in Köln. J. P. Bachem Verlag, Köln 2004, ISBN 3-7616-1731-3.
- Stephanie Habeth-Allhorn: 175 Jahre Cellitinnen zur hl. Maria in der Kupfergasse, eine sozial-karitative Ordensgemeinschaft im Herzen von Köln. J. P. Bachem Verlag, Köln 2003, ISBN 3-7616-1768-2.
- Hugo Rahtgens: Die Kunstdenkmäler der Stadt Köln. Im Auftrage des Provinzialverbandes der Rheinprovinz und mit Unterstützung der Stadt Köln. Herausgegeben von Paul Clemen. 2. Band, I. Abteilung. Düsseldorf, Verlag L. Schwann 1911.
- Adam Wrede: Neuer kölnischer Sprachschatz. 1. Band, Greven Verlag, Köln, 9. Auflage 1984, S. 125, ISBN 3-7743-0155-7.
- Plenker, Werner: St. Maria in Der Kupfergasse Köln. Geschichte Und Beschreibund Der Kirche Und Gnadenkapelle St. Maria in Der Kupfergasse., Köln, 1975.
