= Burghausen bei Schweinfurt =

Coordinates: 50°02′36″N 09°59′56″E

Burghausen (German pronunciation: [bʊʁkˈhaʊzn̩]) in Lower Franconia is a little village in the commune of Wasserlosen. It has about 300 inhabitants.
