= Werl pilgrimage =

Baroque pilgrimage church in Werl, Germany

Alte Wallfahrtskirche Mariae Virginis
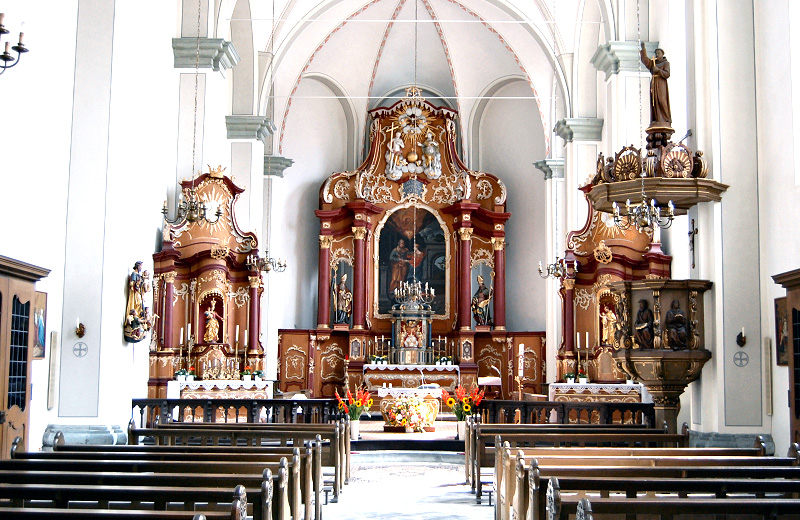
- Interior of the Alte Wallfahrtskirche

Religion
- Affiliation: Catholic
- Province: Diocese of Paderborn
- Ecclesiastical or organizational status: Church
- Year consecrated: 1789

Location
- Location: Werl, North Rhine-Westphalia, Germany
- Interactive map of Alte Wallfahrtskirche; Mariae Virginis
- Coordinates: 51°33′13″N 07°54′55″E

Architecture
- Architect: Franz Arnold Matthias Boner
- Type: Hall church
- Style: Baroque

A pilgrimage to a statue of Mary in Werl, North Rhine-Westphalia, Germany, caused the building of pilgrimage churches there. The first one, completed in 1662, was replaced by a Baroque building completed in 1789, which later became known as the Alte Wallfahrtskirche (Old Pilgrimage Church). When it became too small, an adjacent Wallfahrtsbasilika (Pilgrimage Basilica) was built, dedicated to the Visitation (Mariä Heimsuchung). It was declared a Basilica minor in 1953.

== History ==
A pilgrimage to a miraculous image of Mary (wundertätiges Marienbild) in Werl began in 1661. The Gnadenbild is a wood-carved figure of Mary with her son on her lap, dated to the 12th century. An abbey church of the Order of Friars Minor Capuchin, designed by a friar Bonitus from Trier and completed in 1662, became unstable and was demolished. A larger church was built instead to accommodate the rising numbers of pilgrims.

=== Wallfahrtskirche ===
The pilgrimage church (Wallfahrtskirche), which also served as an abbey church for the friars (Kapuzinerkirche), was designed by Franz Arnold Matthias Boner and built from 1786 to 1789, as a hall church in Baroque style with five bays and a rectangular choir. The interior is cross-vaulted and features high windows. Uniform interior furnishings date from the late 17th century. The church was dedicated to Mary (Mariae Virginis).

The building was expanded to the east from 1859 to 1860. The choir was changed to a five-sided choir, and the church was equipped with a ridge turret. In 1953, the colour scheme of the carvings was unified.

=== Wallfahrtsbasilika ===
Wallfahrtsbasilika Mariae Heimsuchung
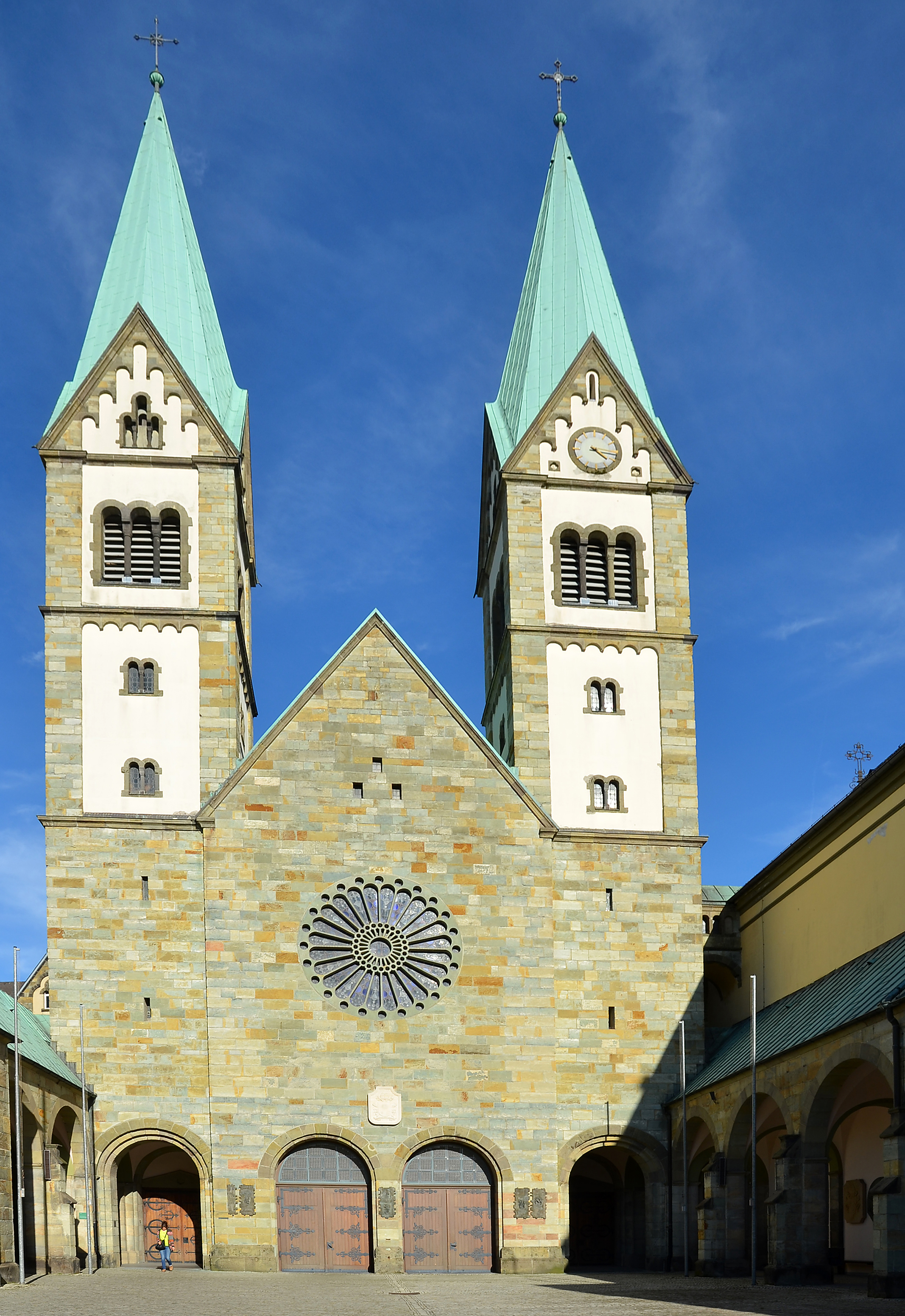
- Front of the Wallfahrtsbasilika

Religion
- Year consecrated: 1906

Location
- Interactive map of Wallfahrtsbasilika; Mariae Heimsuchung

Architecture
- Architect: Wilhelm Sunder-Plaßmann
- Style: Romanesque Revival

When the Baroque church became too small for the growing number of pilgrims, an adjacent Wallfahrtsbasilika was created. It was built from 1904 to 1906, designed by Wilhelm Sunder-Plaßmann in Romanesque Revival style. The builder also worked for the Münster Cathedral. He used Rüthener Grünsandstein, a local sandstone, for a building dominated by two high steeples in the west. The basilica was consecrated, dedicated to the Visitation (Mariä Heimsuchung), on 24 May 1911 by Karl Joseph Schulte, Bishop of Paderborn. It was declared a Basilica minor on 16 October 1953 by Pope Pius XII.

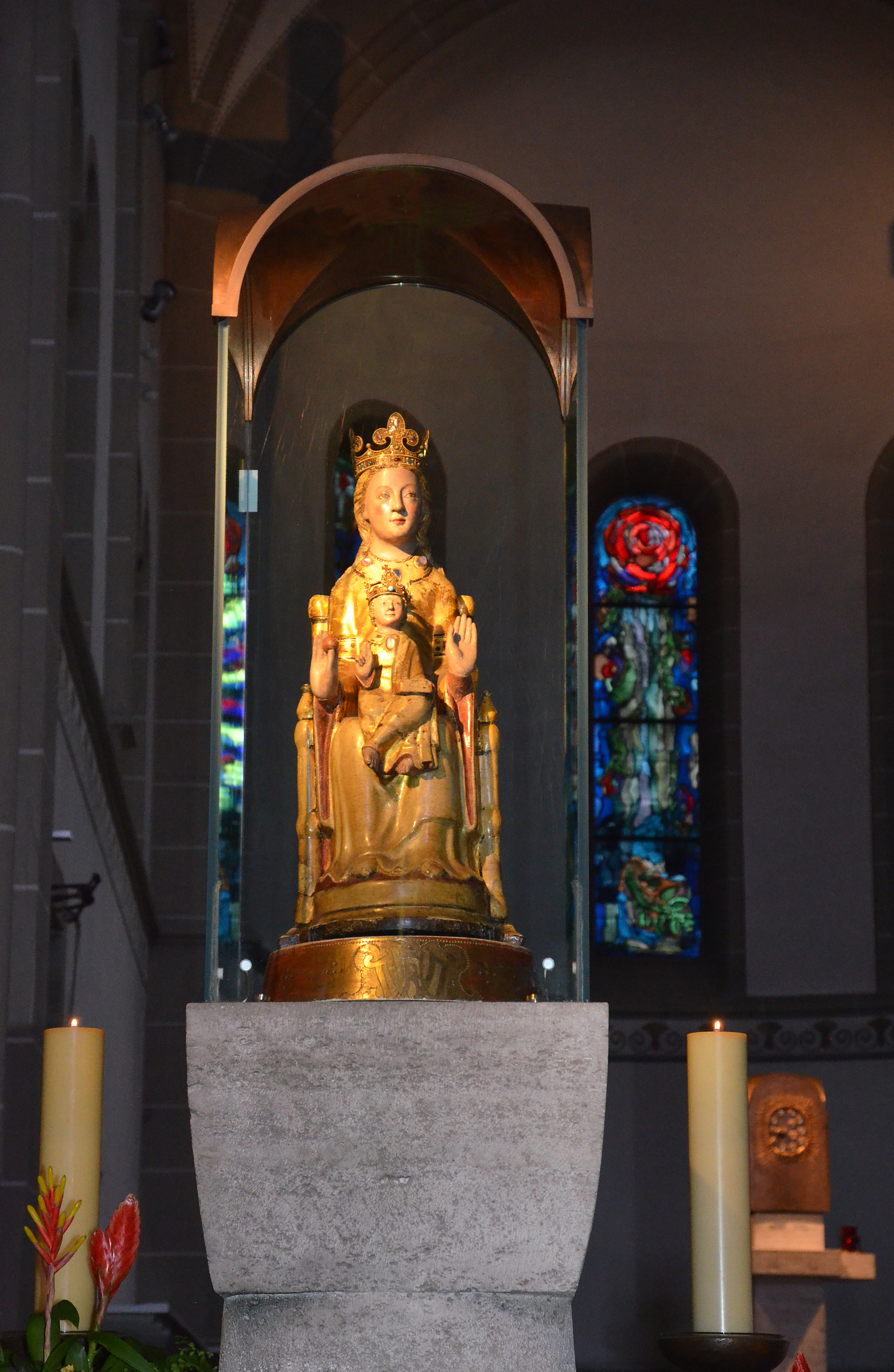
The Gnadenbild in the basilica

== Literature ==
- Anton Henze et al.: Reclams Kunstführer Deutschland, Bd. 3: Rheinlande und Westfalen. Baudenkmäler. Reclam, Stuttgart 1975, ISBN 3-15-008401-6, p. 730.
- Georg Dehio, Ursula Quednau: Handbuch der deutschen Kunstdenkmäler, Nordrhein-Westfalen, Band 2: Westfalen. Deutscher Kunstverlag, Berlin 2011, ISBN 978-3-422-03114-2, p. 1168
- Amalie Rohrer, Hans Jürgen Zacher (eds.): Werl. Geschichte einer westfälischen Stadt, Bd. 1 in: Studien und Quellen zur westfälischen Geschichte. Bd. 31 Teil 1. Bonifatius Verlag, Paderborn 1994, ISBN 3-87088-844-X.
