= Wasserlosen =

- Municipality
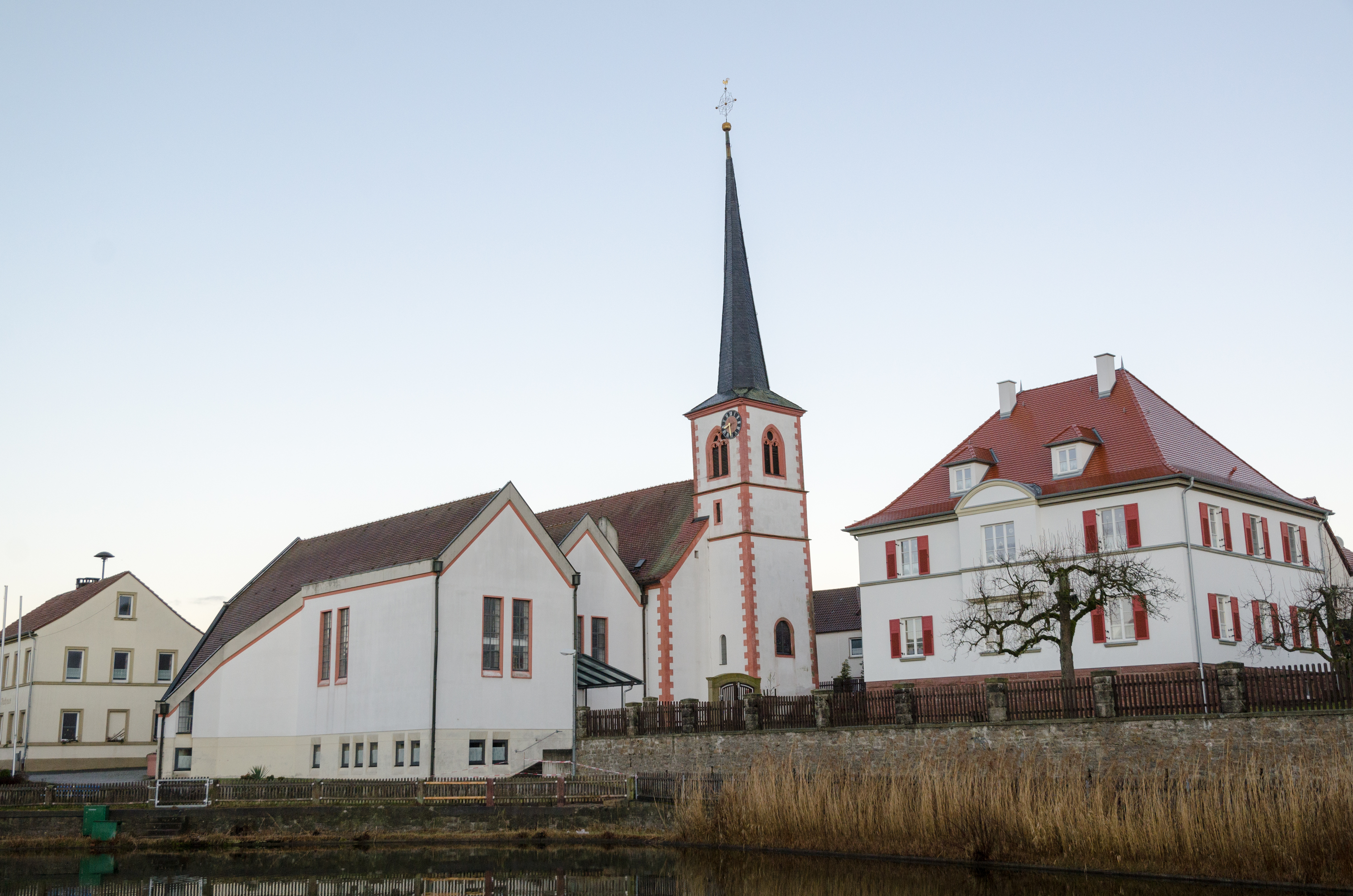
- Church of Saints Simon and Jude

- Coat of arms

- Location of Wasserlosen within Schweinfurt district
- Interactive map of Wasserlosen
- Location within Germany Location within Bavaria
- Coordinates: 50°5′39″N 10°1′49″E
- Country: Germany
- State: Bavaria
- Admin. region: Unterfranken
- District: Schweinfurt

Government
  - Mayor (2020–26): Anton Gößmann

Area
  - Total: 51.32 km^{2} (19.81 sq mi)
- Elevation: 340 m (1,120 ft)

Population (2025-12-31)
  - Total: 3,379
  - Density: 65.84/km^{2} (170.5/sq mi)
- Time zone: UTC+01:00 (CET)
  - Summer (DST): UTC+02:00 (CEST)
- Postal codes: 97535
- Dialling codes: 09726
- Vehicle registration: SW
- Website: www.wasserlosen.de

Wasserlosen is a municipality in the Schweinfurt district, Bavaria, Germany. The villages in this municipality are:

- Brebersdorf
- Burghausen bei Schweinfurt
- Greßthal
- Kaisten
- Rütschenhausen
- Schwemmelsbach
- Wasserlosen
- Wülfershausen
