= Rütschenhausen =

- Village
- Location in Germany
- Coordinates: 50°03′39″N 10°03′24″E

Population
  - Total: 200

Rütschenhausen is a little village in the commune Wasserlosen in Lower Franconia, Bavaria, Germany. It has about 200 inhabitants.

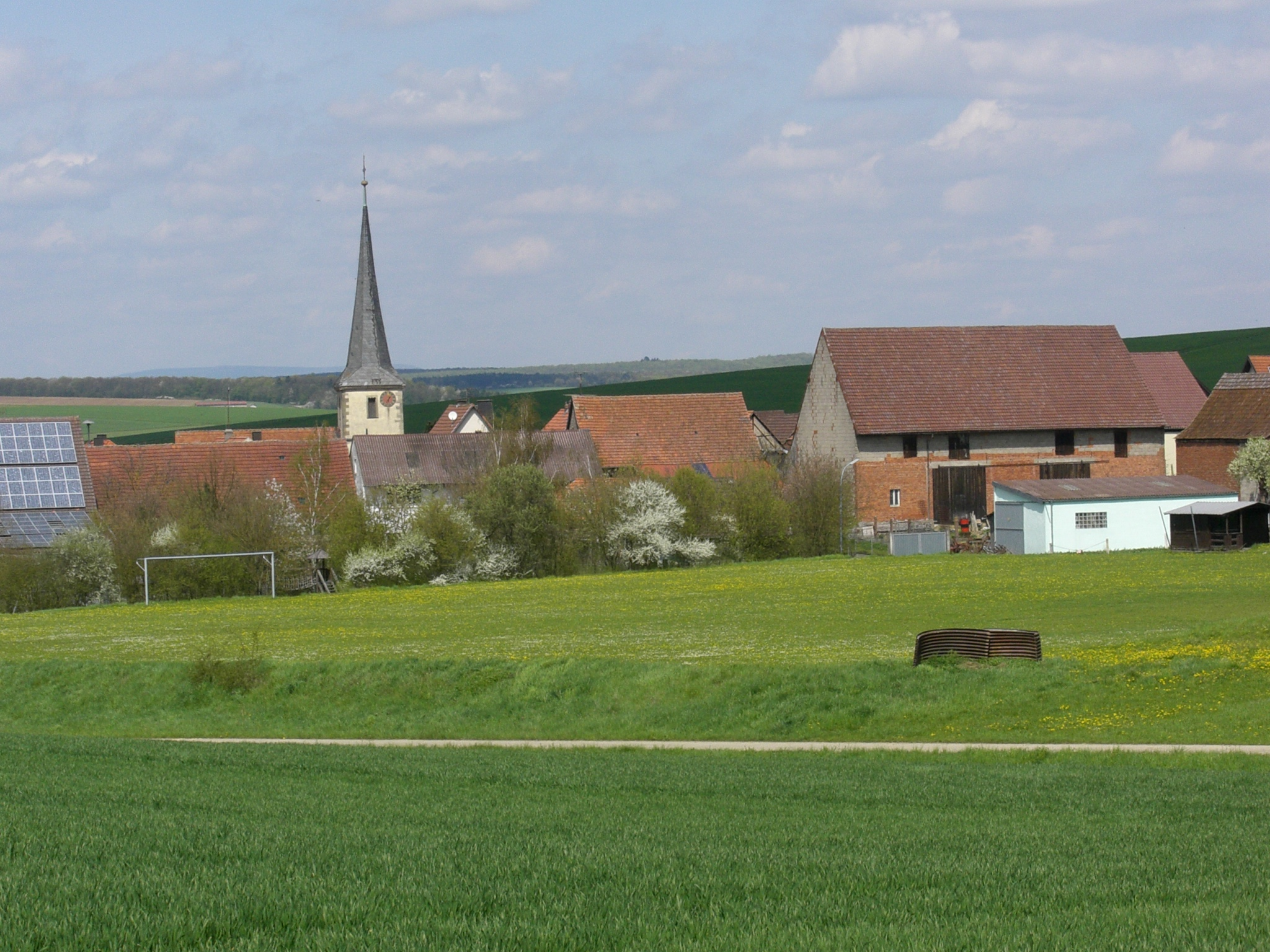
View from the sports field

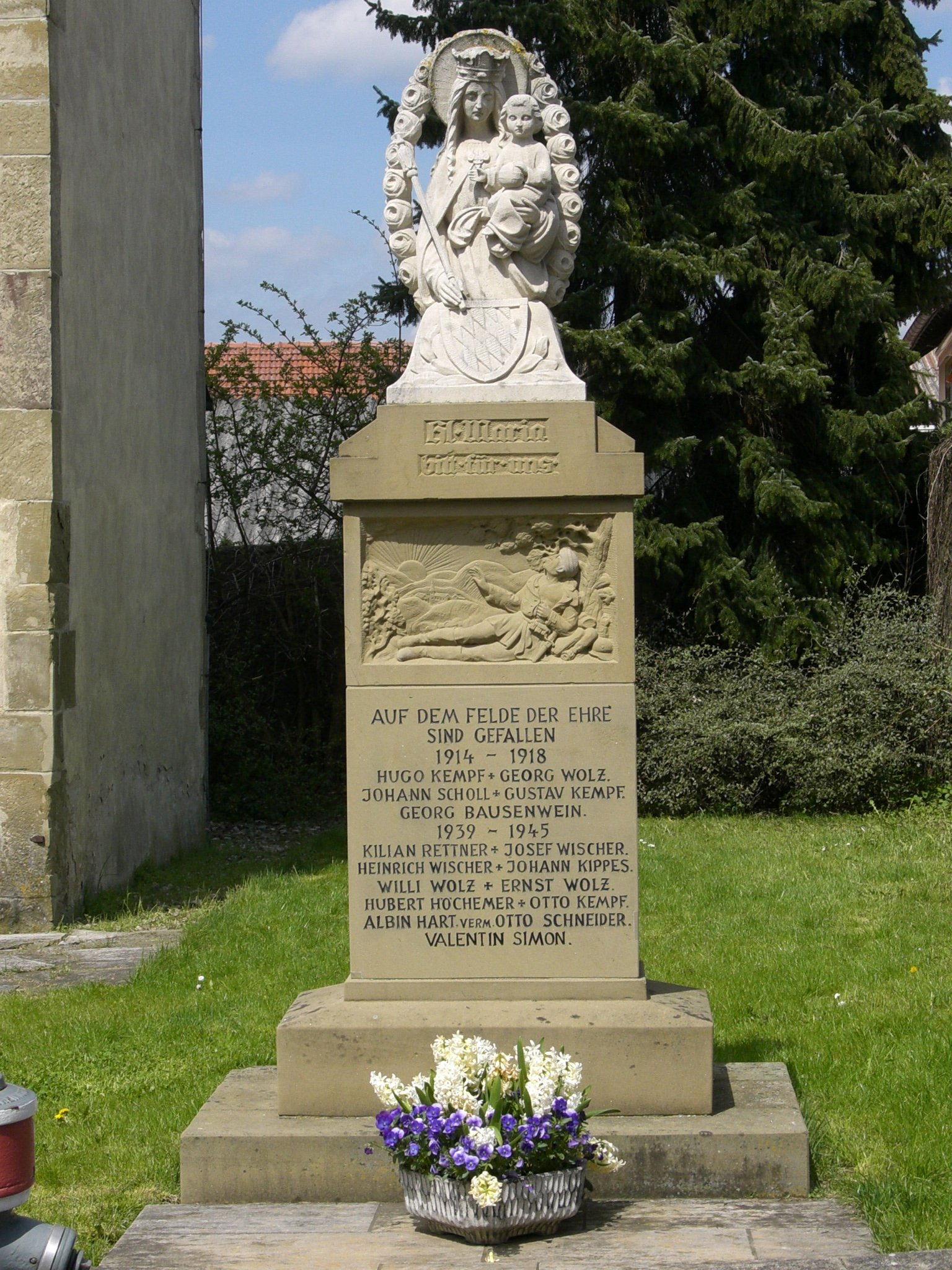
War memorial of 1st and 2nd World War
