= List of Christian pilgrimage sites =

This is a list of sites notable as destinations of Christian pilgrimage, sorted by region and country (with modern name). For a list of only Roman Catholic churches often visited by pilgrims, see Pilgrimage church.

== Old World ==
=== The Holy Land ===
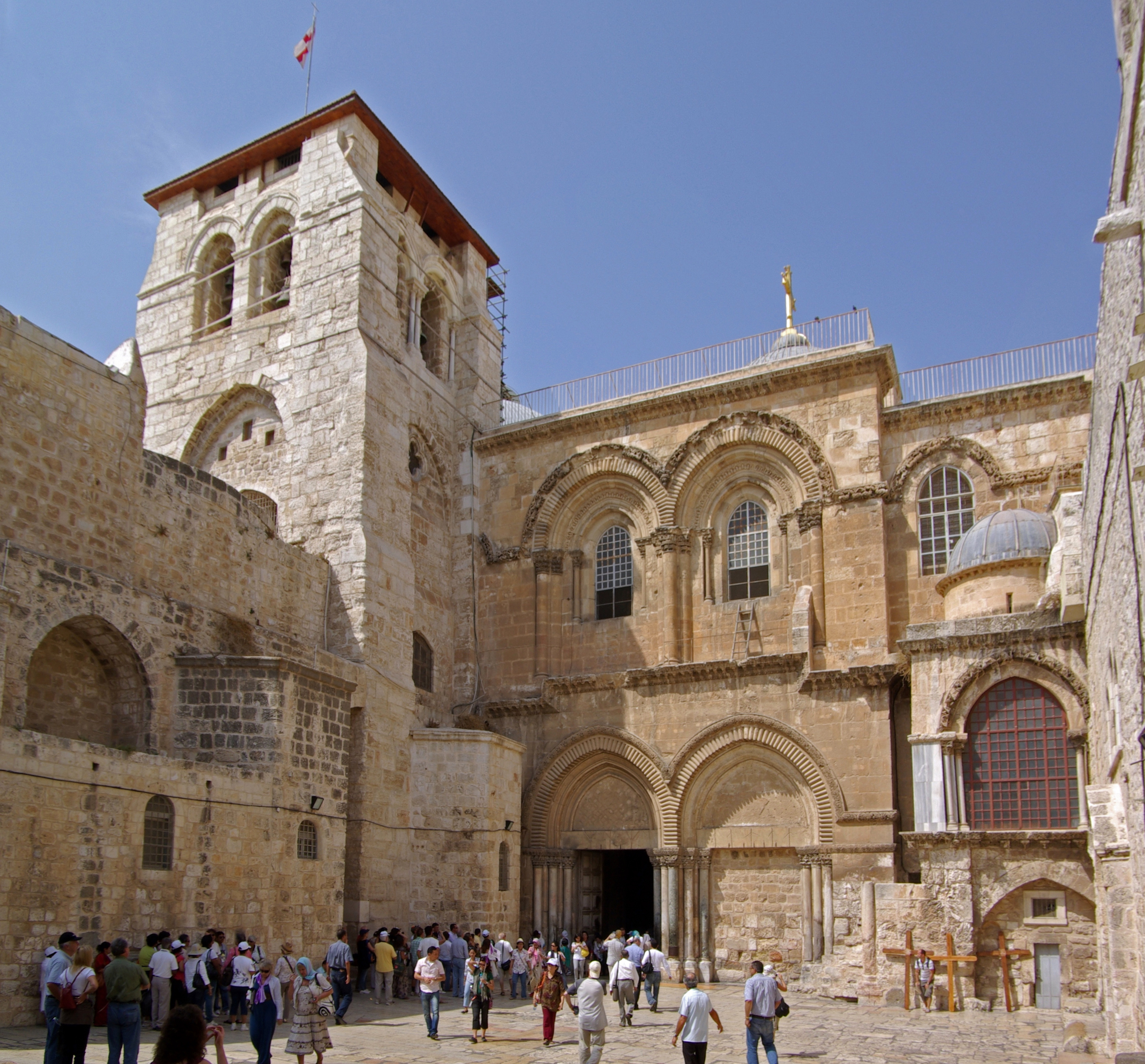
Church of the Holy Sepulchre, Jerusalem, Israel.

The Holy Land is where many events in the Old Testament and New Testament of the Bible transpired, mainly overlapping the combined territory of modern-day Israel and Palestine (Gaza and the West Bank). In alphabetical order, the main sites are these:

- Abu Ghosh: the modern site of the biblical Kiriath-Jearim, where the Ark of the Covenant was stored after its return from the Philistines.
- Beit Sahour: the site of the Adoration of the Shepherds ("Shepherds' Field").
- Bethany: the site of the resurrection of Lazarus.
- Bethlehem: the birthplace of Jesus, marked in particular by the Church of the Nativity.
- Burqin Church: a station for many Christian pilgrims commemorating a miracle of Jesus, according to Christian tradition, when, as he passed through the village of Burqin on his way to Jerusalem from Nazareth, he heard cries for help from 10 lepers isolated in quarantine and cured them. Also one of the world's oldest churches.
- Beit Jimal Monastery: the traditional burial site of Saint Stephen, the first Christian martyr; Nicodemus; and Gamaliel the Elder.
- Caesarea Maritima: a place first introduced to Christianity by Philip the Deacon; also the brief home of the Apostles Paul and Peter.
- Caesarea Philippi: an ancient city mentioned in the Gospels of Matthew and Mark, and considered to be where Jesus confirmed Peter's assumption that he was the Messiah.
- Cana: a historical location traditionally held in widest Christian belief to have been in Galilee where, as recorded in the Gospel of John, Jesus performed the miracle of turning water into wine at the wedding at Cana. There are, however, other locations in Christian belief as the site of this miracle—including Qana Al Jaleel, in the Lebanon section below.
- The Cenacle: a room in Jerusalem, just outside the Old City walls, believed in Christian tradition to be the site of the Last Supper.
- Deir Hajla, or Saint Gerasimos Monastery: monastery dedicated to Saint Gerasimos, located on the site where Mary, Joseph, and Jesus used to rest during the Flight to Egypt, near Jericho and Qasr al-Yahud.
- Deir Rafat Monastery: the Catholic Shrine of Our Lady Queen of Palestine and of the Holy Land (Notre-Dame de Palestine), in the Elah Valley of central Israel.
- Ein Karem: the traditional birthplace of Saint John the Baptist, with several churches dedicated to his family, birth, and ministry.
- Emmaus: the location where Jesus revealed himself to two disciples after his resurrection, although other places are also identified as the site:
  - Al-Qubeiba ("Franciscan Emmaus"): the site of a large church built by the Franciscan order because the Franciscan tradition views this location as the biblical Emmaus. Also listed in the Palestine: the West Bank section below.
  - Emmaus Nicopolis: the most traditional site identified as Emmaus, with ruins of Byzantine and Crusader churches, and home to the Catholic community of the Beatitudes.
- Hebron: the site of the Cave of the Patriarchs, where the patriarchs and matriarchs Abraham and Sarah, Isaac and Rebecca, and Jacob and Leah are believed to be buried.
- Jacob's well, Nablus (West Bank): a well associated with the biblical patriarch Jacob.
- Jaffa (Joppa), the site of the house of Simon the Tanner, where Saint Peter raised Saint Tabitha from the dead and also the site of her eventual burial site.
- Jericho: the site of the Mount of Temptation and of the sycamore tree of Zacchaeus.
- Jerusalem: the site of the Passion of Jesus, known for the Via Dolorosa (Way of Sorrows)—the path he walked on the way to the crucifixion—as well as the sites of Calvary, where the crucifixion took place, and the tomb in which he was placed afterward. The Monastery of the Cross, traditionally held to be the site where the wood to construct the cross was harvested, is also in the city.
- The "Jesus Trail": a hiking and pilgrimage route connecting sites of Jesus' biographical life and ministry as described in the Gospels.
- Lod (Lydda): the traditional birth and burial site of Saint George, one of the most venerated Christian martyrs.
- Mar Saba: the most important and largest monastery in the Holy Land and the resting place of Saint Sabas, the monk who built the monastery.
- Mount Carmel: the site of Elijah's famous challenge to the prophets of Baal.
- Mount Tabor: the site of the Transfiguration of Jesus.
- Nain: the site of the raising of the son of the widow of Nain, one of Jesus' miracles.
- Nazareth: the hometown of Jesus.
- Sea of Galilee: the site of several important sites of the ministry of Jesus:
  - Bethsaida: the birthplaces of several of Jesus' Apostles–Philip, Andrew, Peter (John 1:44; John 12:21)–and perhaps also James and John.
  - Capernaum: the "town of Jesus" with the house of Saint Peter.
  - Magdala: the birthplace of Mary Magdalene.
  - Mount of Beatitudes: the place where Jesus is believed to have delivered the Sermon on the Mount.
  - Tabgha: the place of Jesus' first miracle of the multiplication of the loaves and fishes.
- Qasr al-Yahud: part of the traditional site of the baptism of Jesus by John the Baptist (see Al-Maghtas and Bethany Beyond the Jordan). On the west bank of the Jordan River near Jericho. Has many abandoned Christian monasteries, and only the Greek Orthodox Monastery of Saint John has reopened.
- Sepphoris: the site of the home of Anne and Joachim, parents of the Virgin Mary.

=== Eastern Christianity ===
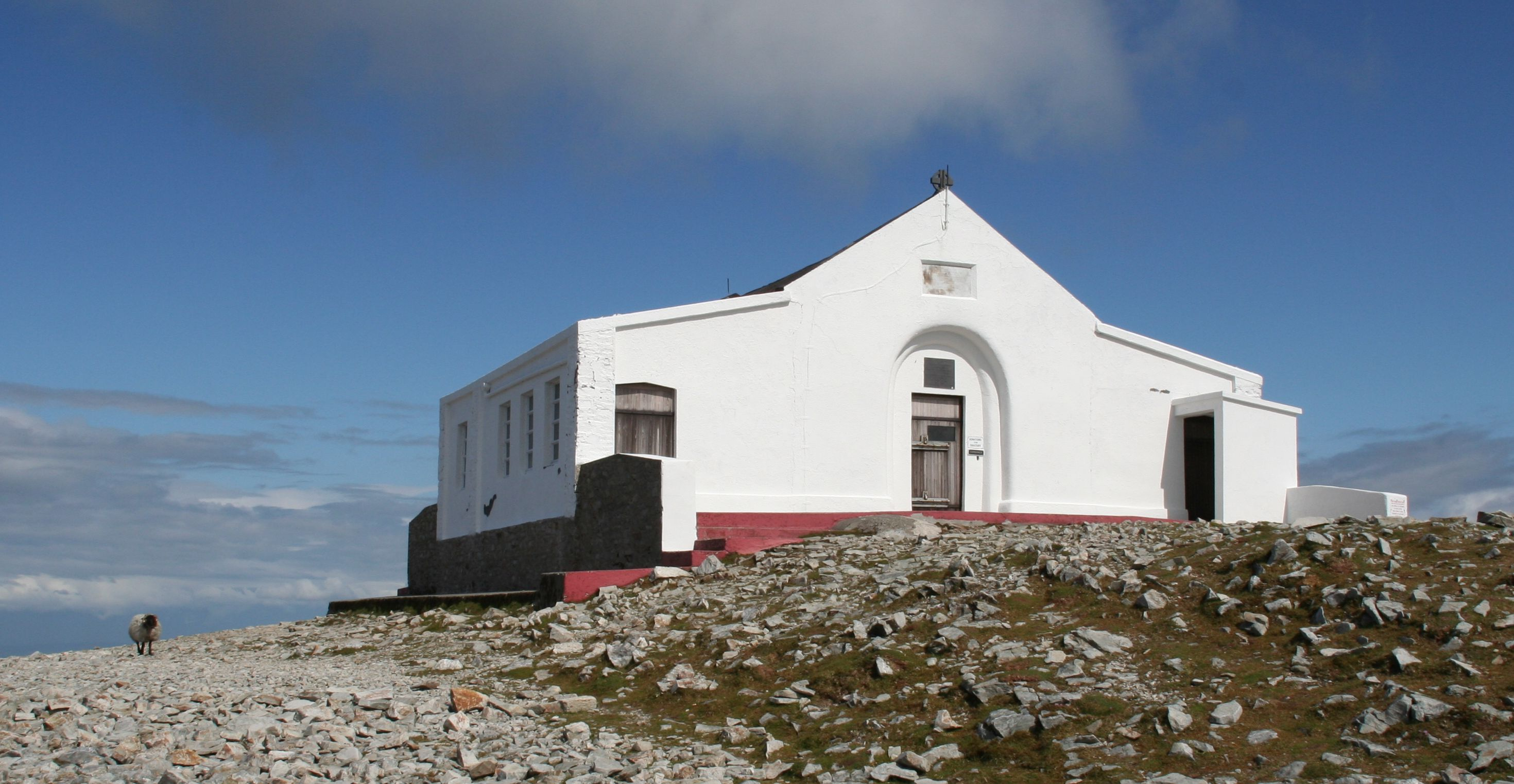
Croagh Patrick chapel, County Mayo, Ireland.

Sites associated with Eastern Christianity in Eastern Europe and the Near East (excluding the Holy Land proper).

==== Armenia ====
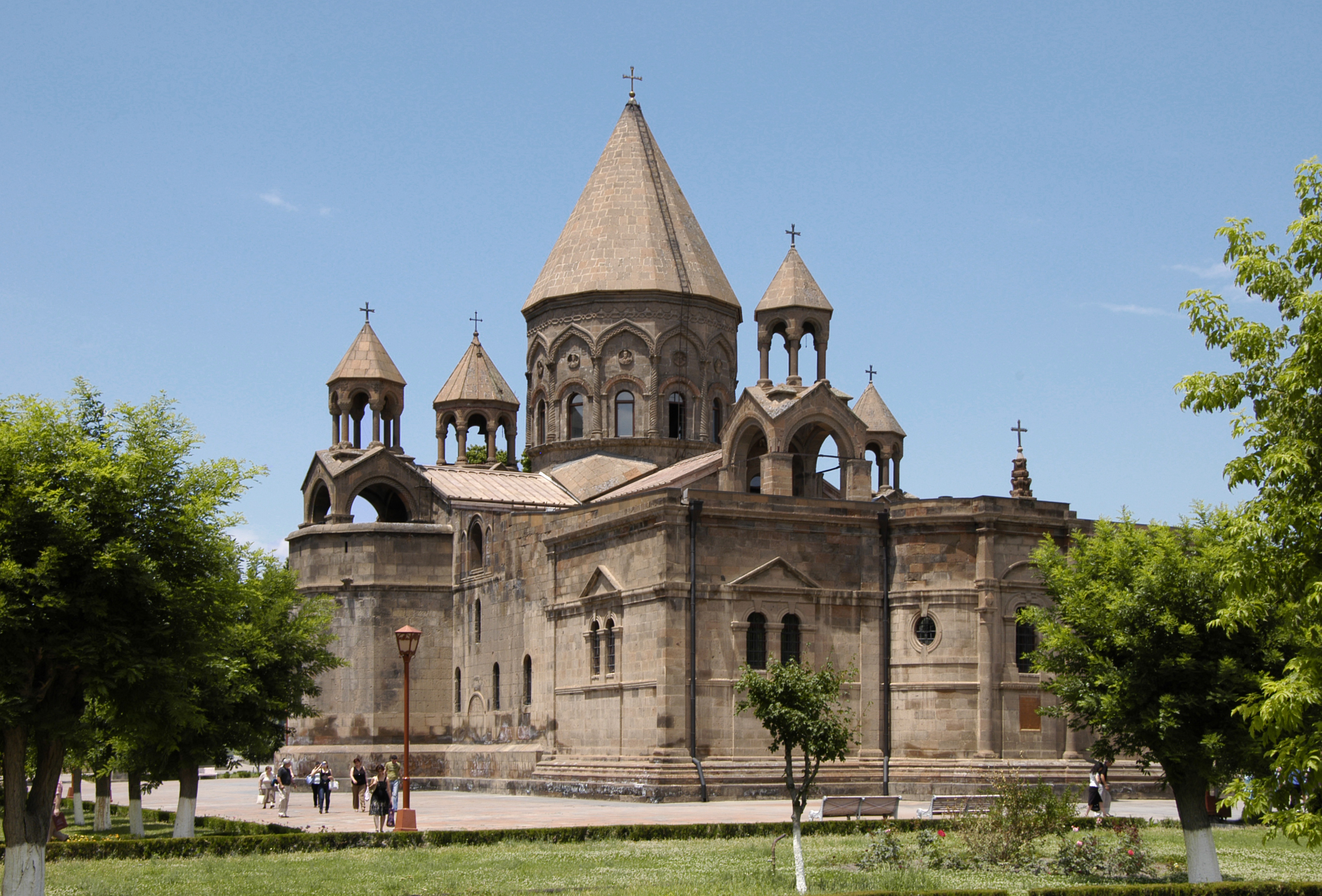
Etchmiadzin Cathedral, Etchmiadzin, Armenia.

- Etchmiadzin Cathedral, Etchmiadzin.
- Khor Virap.

==== Azerbaijan ====
- Ghazanchetsots Cathedral.

==== Bulgaria ====
- Rila Monastery: the largest and most famous Eastern Orthodox monastery in Bulgaria.

==== Egypt ====
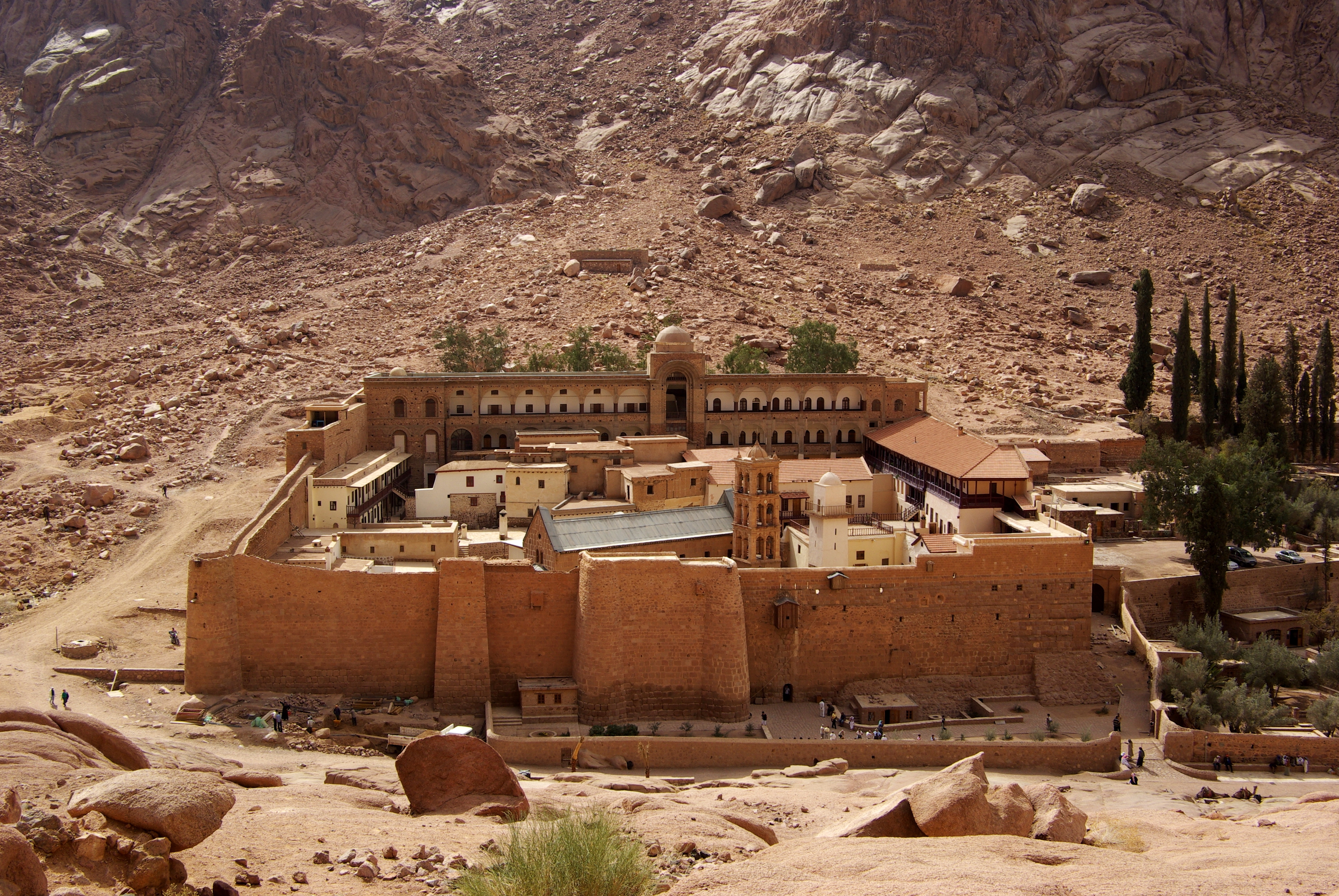
Saint Catherine's Monastery, Mount Sinai in Egypt's South Sinai Peninsula.

- Abu Mena: an ancient monastery founded on the burial site of Saint Menas of Egypt; a modern monastery was rebuilt just north of the site.
- Coptic Cairo: contains several sites linked to the Holy Family's flight into Egypt.
- El Matareya, Cairo: the site of a tree known as the Tree of the Virgin connected with the Holy Family's flight into Egypt.
- Monastery of Saint Anthony, Eastern Desert: a Coptic Orthodox monastery/cathedral.
- Saint Catherine's Monastery, Mount Sinai: the traditional site of the Burning Bush and the reception of the Ten Commandments.
- Wadi El Natrun, also known as Scetis: the site of several monasteries connected with the earliest Desert Fathers, four of which are still operational.

==== Ethiopia ====
- Abuna Yemata Guh, Tigray region: a church hewn from rock 8,460 ft (2,580 m) high, requiring a 45-minute ascent on foot.
- Church of Our Lady Mary of Zion, Tigray region: said to contain the Ark of the Covenant.
- Lalibela, Amhara region: a town with rock-hewn churches said to be carved by angels.

==== Georgia ====
- David Gareja monastery complex, Kakheti region: a rock-hewn monastery complex founded in the 6th century.
- Gelati Monastery, Kutaisi: contains the Church of the Virgin, founded in 1106, and the 13th-century churches of Saints George and Nicholas (UNESCO World Heritage Site).
- Svetitskhoveli Cathedral, Mtskheta: an 11th-century jvari (monastery), 6th century (UNESCO World Heritage Sites).
- Vardzia, southern Georgia: a cave monastery site.

==== Greece ====
- Mount Athos, Athos peninsula: an Orthodox monastic centre.
- Patmos: traditionally held to be the island where John the Apostle received Revelation.
- Saint Nicholas of Spata, Achaea: road to Saint Nicholas.
- Tinos island: known for a reportedly miraculous icon of the Virgin Mother to which pilgrims flock on the anniversary of her ascension (as described in Catholic tradition).

==== India ====
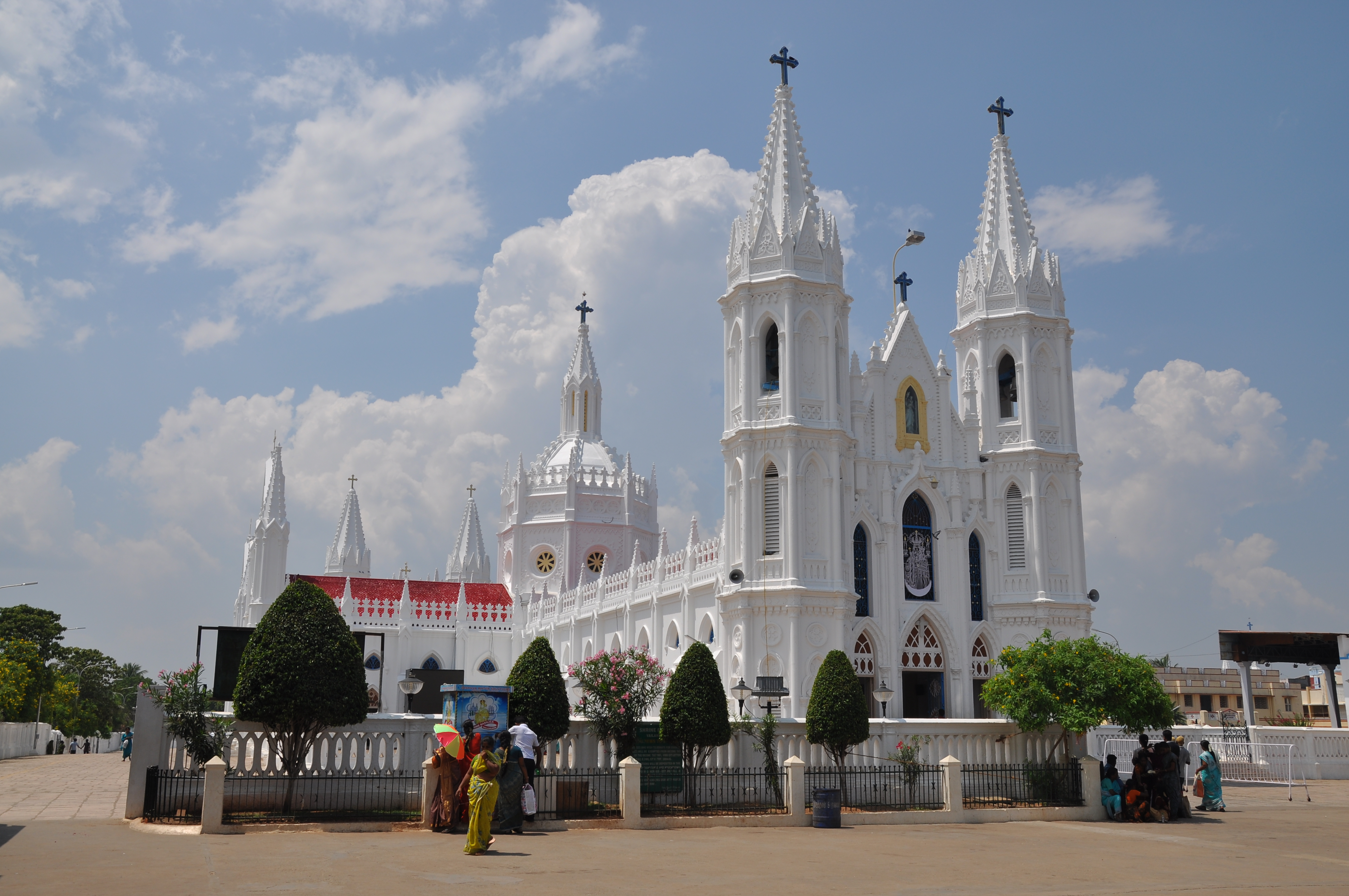
Basilica of Our Lady of Good Health, a 16th-century Marian apparition shrine, Velankanni, Tamil Nadu, India.

- Basilica of Our Lady of Good Health, Velankanni, Tamil Nadu: the site of an apparition of the Virgin Mary and Infant Jesus, and one of Asia's largest Catholic pilgrimage sites.
- Divine Mercy Shrine of Holy Mary Thodupuzha, Kerala: the site of a Marian apparition.
- St Mary's Martha Mariyam Major Arch Episcopal Pilgrim Centre, Kuravilangad, Kerala: the site believed to be the site of the Virgin Mary's first apparition in the world.
- St Thomas Church, Thumpoly, Alleppey, Kerala: (Marian Pilgrimage Shrine of Alappuzha).
- St Mary's Forane Church, Bharananganam, Kerala: the site of the tomb of Alphonsa of the Immaculate Conception, India's first Religious sister Catholic saint.
- St Peter and St Paul's Church, Parumala: an Orthodox Syrian Church containing the tomb of Saint Mor Gregorios.
- Mor Ignatius Dayro Church, Omallur, Kerala: location of the tomb of Syrian Orthodox Patriarch Ignatius Elias III, to which thousands of pilgrims from all over the world come by foot on his annual feast day, 13 February.
- St Mary's Church, Thiruvithamcode, Tamil Nadu: the site considered the world's oldest still-standing church structure.
- Marthoma Cheriyapally Church, Kothamangalam, Kerala.
- St Thomas Mount: the site where Saint Thomas the Apostle was martyred.
- Shrine of the Infant Jesus, Nashik, Maharashtra.
- St George Orthodox Church, Puthuppally Pally, Kerala: an international Georgian pilgrim center.
- St Mary's Forane Church of Korattymuthy Koratty, Kerala: a Marian pilgrimage shrine.
- St Joseph's Pilgrim Church, Peringuzha, Muvattupuzha, Kerala.

==== Iran ====
- St Thaddeus Monastery.
- Tomb of Esther and Mordechai.

==== Jordan ====
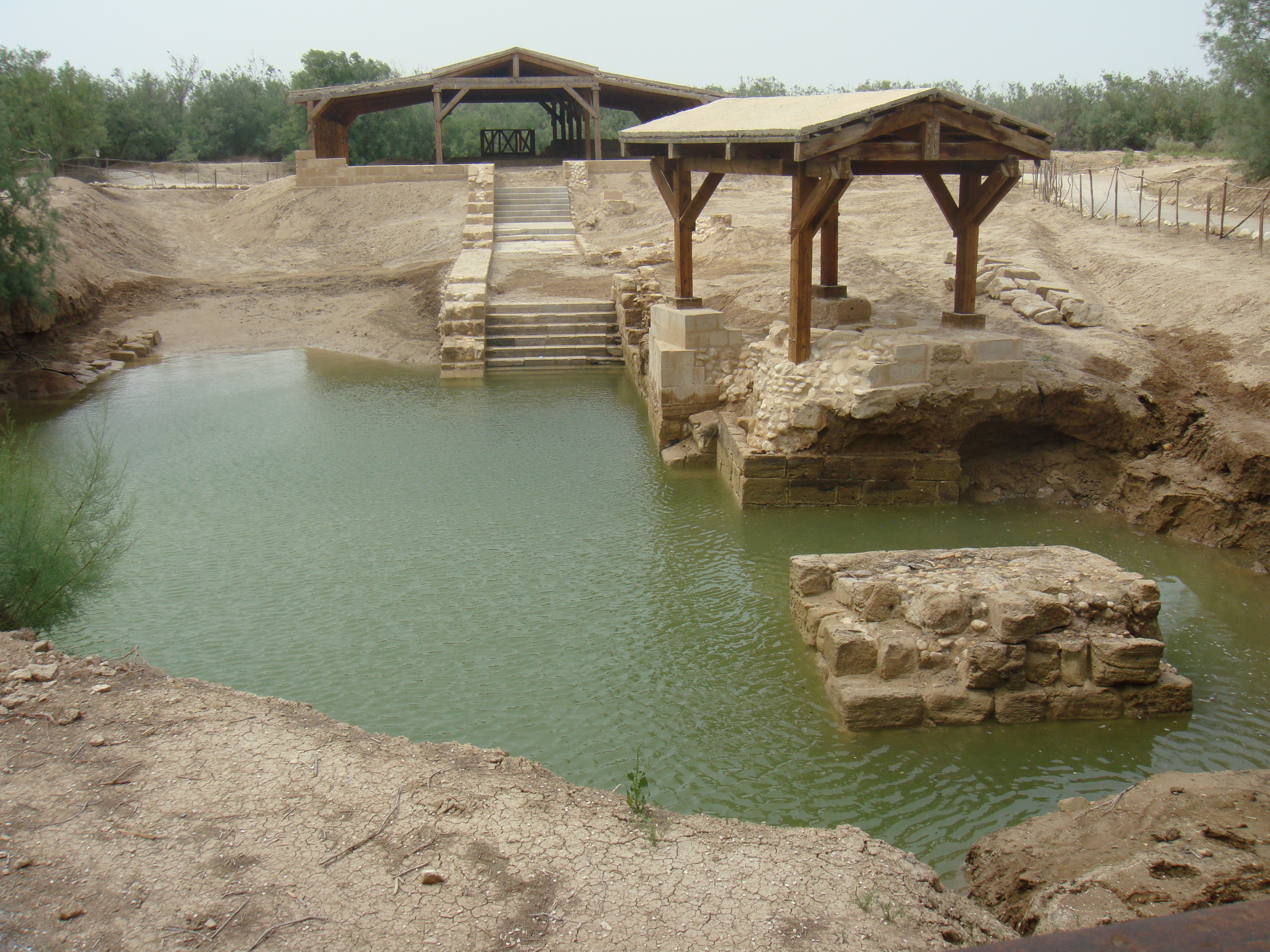
Al-Maghtas ruins on the eastern side of the Jordan River across from Jericho, location of the ministry of John the Baptist and the baptism of Jesus, Jordan.

Alphabetically by noun, ignoring the Arabic article (al-, el-)

- Anjara, Our Lady of the Mount Church: built around a cave where according to tradition Jesus, the Virgin Mary, and the disciples rested during a trip between Jerusalem and Galilee.
- Bethabara (Al-Maghtas): the site of the baptism of Jesus, recognized by all major Christian denominations, on the east bank of the Jordan River across from Jericho. See also Bethany beyond the Jordan.
- Machaerus: the Herodian fortress where John the Baptist was imprisoned and beheaded.
- Mount Nebo: the traditional site where Moses looked over to the Promised Land and of his death.
- Tell Mar Elias outside Ajloun: ruins of a large Byzantine church dedicated to the Prophet Elijah the Tishbite, located in the area of biblical Tishbe in Gilead.

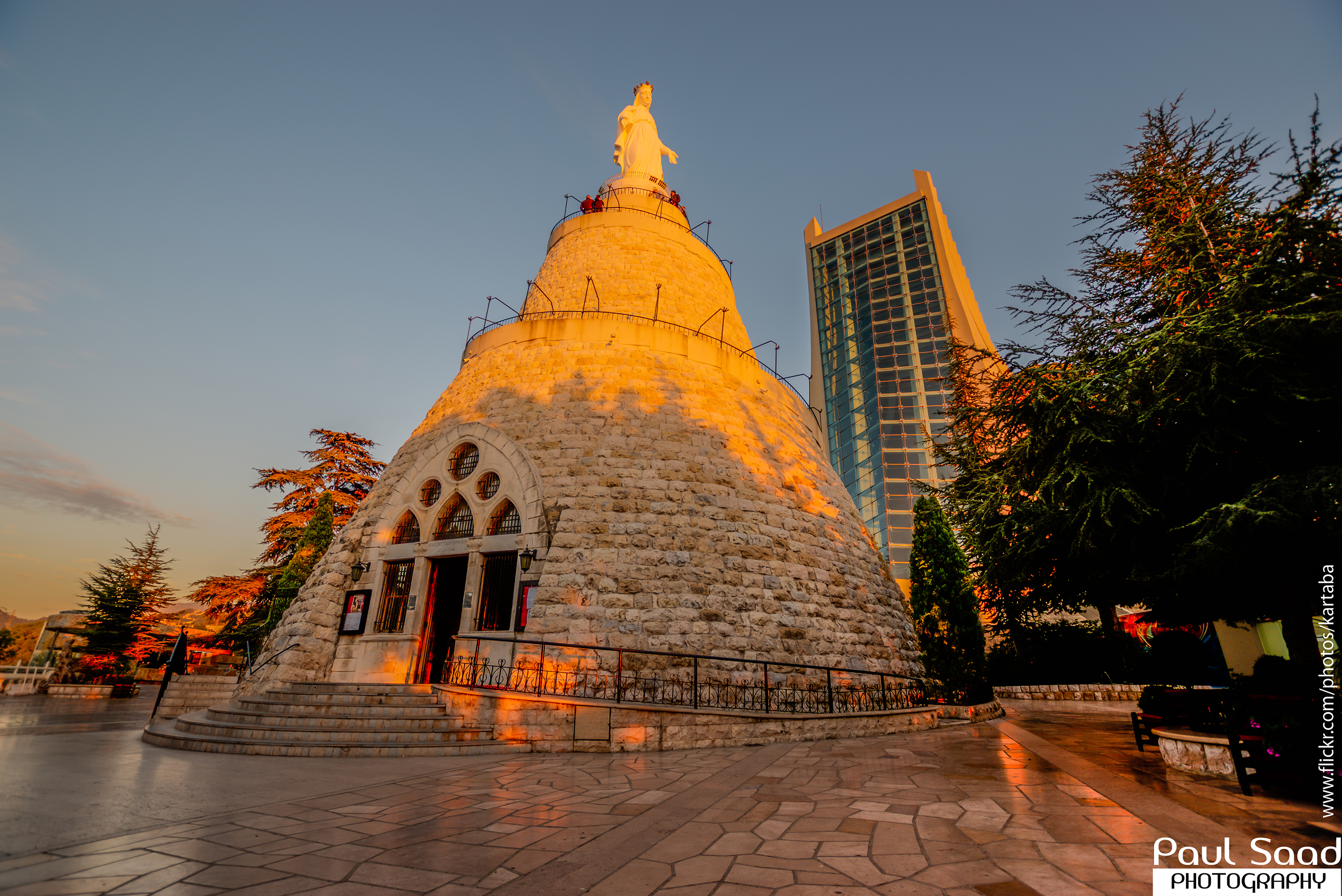
Our Lady of Lebanon, Harissa, Lebanon.

==== Lebanon ====
- Our Lady of Lebanon, Harissa, Keserwan District.
- Monastery of Qozhaya,Wadi Qozhaya, Zgharta District.
- Monastery of Saint Maron, Annaya, Byblos District: Sanctuary of Saint Charbel.
- Monastery of Saint Joseph, Jrabta, Batroun District: Sanctuary of Saint Rafqa.
- Monastery of Saints Cyprian and Justina, Kfifan, Batroun District: Sanctuary of Saint Nimatullah Kassab.
- Qana Al Jaleel, Qana, Tyre District: the site where it is believed that Jesus Christ performed His first miracle, transforming water into wine at the wedding at Cana. (See Cana in the Holy Land section above.)

==== Romania ====
- Iași: where over 1 million pilgrims come from all over Romania. Supposedly, neighboring Orthodox countries queued to touch the relics of Saint Paraskevi.

==== Russia ====
- Diveyevo Monastery: the main shrine of Saint Seraphim of Sarov.
- Trinity Lavra of Saint Sergius: the main shrine of Saint Sergius of Radonezh.
- Pokrovsky Monastery: the main shrine of Saint Matrona of Moscow.
- Valaam Monastery: the main pilgrimage centre in northwest Russia.

==== Serbia ====
- Djunis monastery, near Kruševac: a shrine dedicated to the Virgin Mary as Theotokos, Serbia's most visited shrine.

==== Syria ====
- Damascus: where Paul the Apostle saw the light and was baptized by Ananias, in the House of Ananias on Street Called Straight. Home to the Greek Orthodox Patriarchate of Antioch, the Syriac Catholic Patriarchate of Antioch, and the Melkite Catholic Patriarchate of Antioch.
- Maaloula: one of the last three places in the world along with Al-Sarkha (Bakhah) and Jubb'adin where Western Aramaic, the dialect of Jesus Christ, is still spoken. The Convent of Saint Thecla (Maaloula) and Monastery of Mar Sarkis are notable pilgrimage sites.
- Monastery of St Moses the Abyssinian: site of precious frescoes dating to the 11th and 12th centuries, and recent discoveries suggest that the ruins may date even further back 10,000 years.
- Saidnaya.
- Saint George's Monastery, Homs Governorate, Al-Mishtaya: established in the 5th century, with icons depicting scenes from the lives of Saint George, popular among Middle Eastern Christians, and Jesus Christ, as well as many other ancient items like crosses, writings, books, carvings, goblets, and other tools. The monastery is busiest during pilgrimages on the Feast of Saint George (May 6) and the Feast of the Elevation of the Holy Cross (September 14).
- Saint Mary Church of the Holy Belt, Homs Governorate: dating back to 59 AD, it contains a venerated Holy Girdle believed to be a section of the belt of the Virgin Mary.
- Soufanieh, a suburb of Damascus: the site of a Marian apparition.
- Umayyad Mosque: formerly a church, said to contain the head of John the Baptist to this day. In 2001, Pope John Paul II visited it, becoming the first pope ever to set foot in a mosque.

==== Turkey ====
- Antioch (modern-day Antakya): an early center of Christianity, former seat of the Antiochian Orthodox Church, and home to many old Christian churches, considered "the cradle of Christianity."
- Constantinople (modern-day Istanbul): the former capital of the Byzantine Empire and the see (area of jurisdiction, authority, and seat) of one of the five ancient patriarchates and first among equals among the patriarchs of the Eastern Orthodox Church; the worldwide capital of the Greek Orthodox Church; home to many of the oldest churches in the world; seat of the Patriarch of Constantinople, leader of the Greek Orthodox Church; home to the Church of Saint George; and Hagia Sophia, former cathedral and burial place of many ecumenical patriarchs.
- House of the Virgin Mary, Ephesus: the home of the Virgin Mary until her Assumption/Dormition, a shrine blessed and declared a place of pilgrimage for Christians by Pope John Paul II.

==== Ukraine ====
- Pochayiv Lavra.
- Holy Mountains Lavra.
- Kyiv Pechersk Lavra.

=== Western Christianity ===
Sites associated with Western Christianity (Roman Catholicism, including sites now in Protestant parts of Europe).

==== Austria ====
- Mariazell, Styria: a Marian shrine to Austria and Hungary.

==== Belgium ====
- Banneux: the site of apparitions of the Virgin Mary in 1933.
- Beauraing: the site of apparitions of the Virgin Mary in 1932. .

==== Bosnia and Herzegovina ====
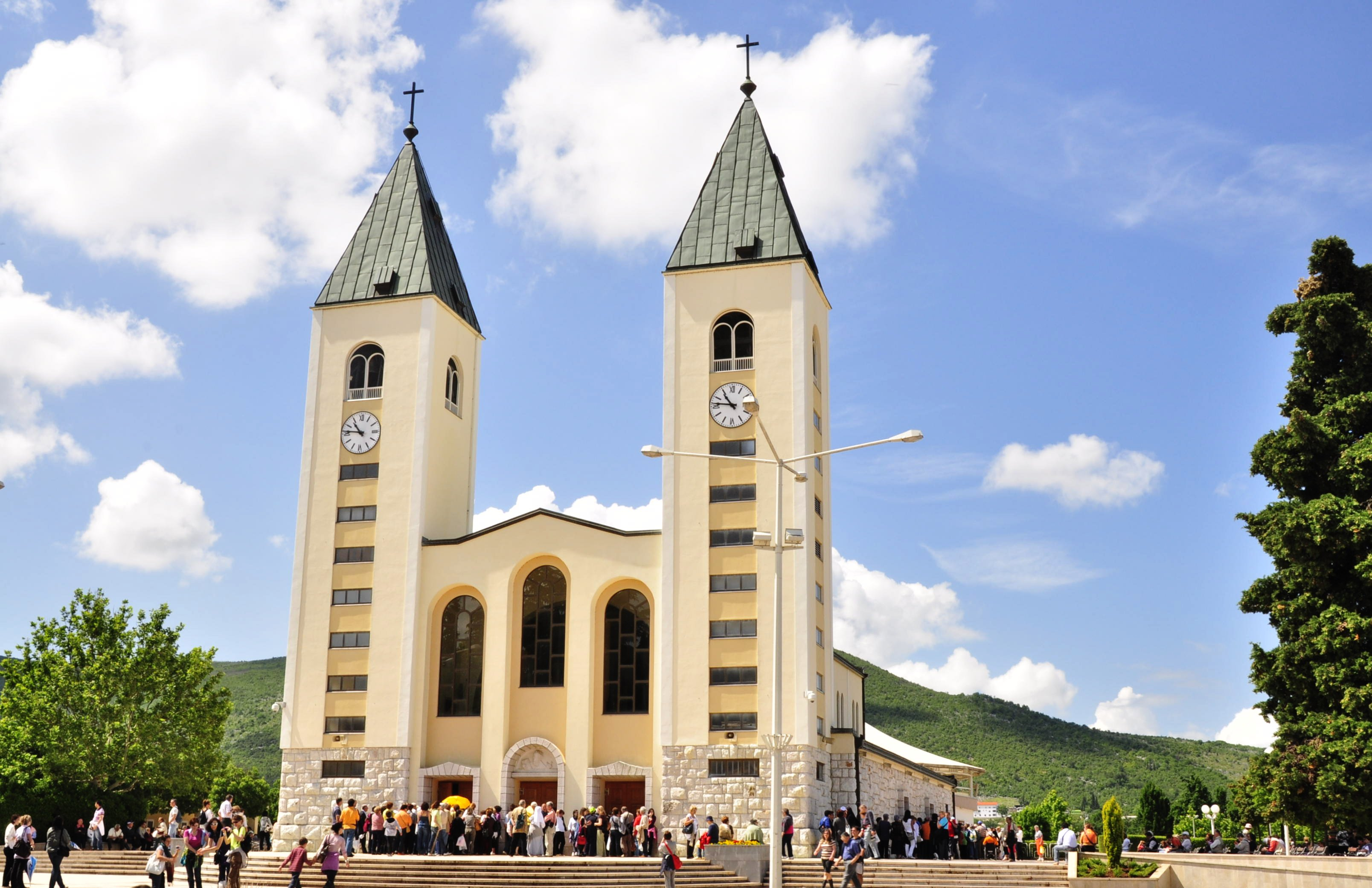
Sanctuary of Our Lady Queen of Peace, Međugorje, Bosnia and Herzegovina.

- Medjugorje: the site of apparitions of the Virgin Mary to six children in 1981.

==== Czech Republic ====
- Basilica of Our Lady of Sorrows, Krupka-Bohosudov.
- Basilica of Saints Lawrence and Zdislava, Jablonné v Podještědí.
- Church of Mary Help of Christians, Zlaté Hory.
- Church of the Name of the Virgin Mary, Křtiny.
- Church of Our Lady of Sorrows, Borovnice-Homole.
- Church of the Visitation of the Virgin Mary, Horní Police.
- Church of Our Lady of Sorrows, Sloup.
- Church of Saint Anne, Karlovy Vary-Sedlec.
- Church of Saint John of Nepomuk, Nepomuk.
- Church of Saint John of Nepomuk at Zelená Hora, Žďár nad Sázavou.
- Cvilín, Krnov.
- Hora Matky Boží Monastery, Králíky.
- Hostýn.
- Stará Boleslav.
- Svatá Hora, Příbram.
- Svatý Kopeček, Olomouc.
- Teplá Abbey, Teplá.
- Velehrad.

==== Finland ====
- Kirkkokari: the only Roman Catholic pilgrimage site in Finland.

==== France ====
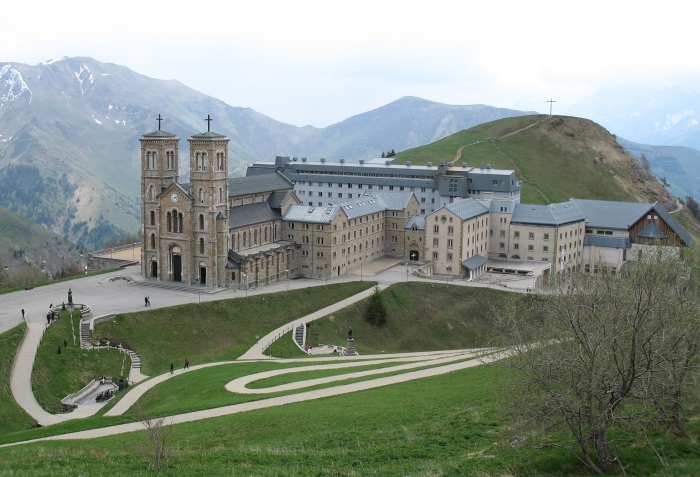
Sanctuary of Our Lady of La Salette, La Salette-Fallavaux, France.

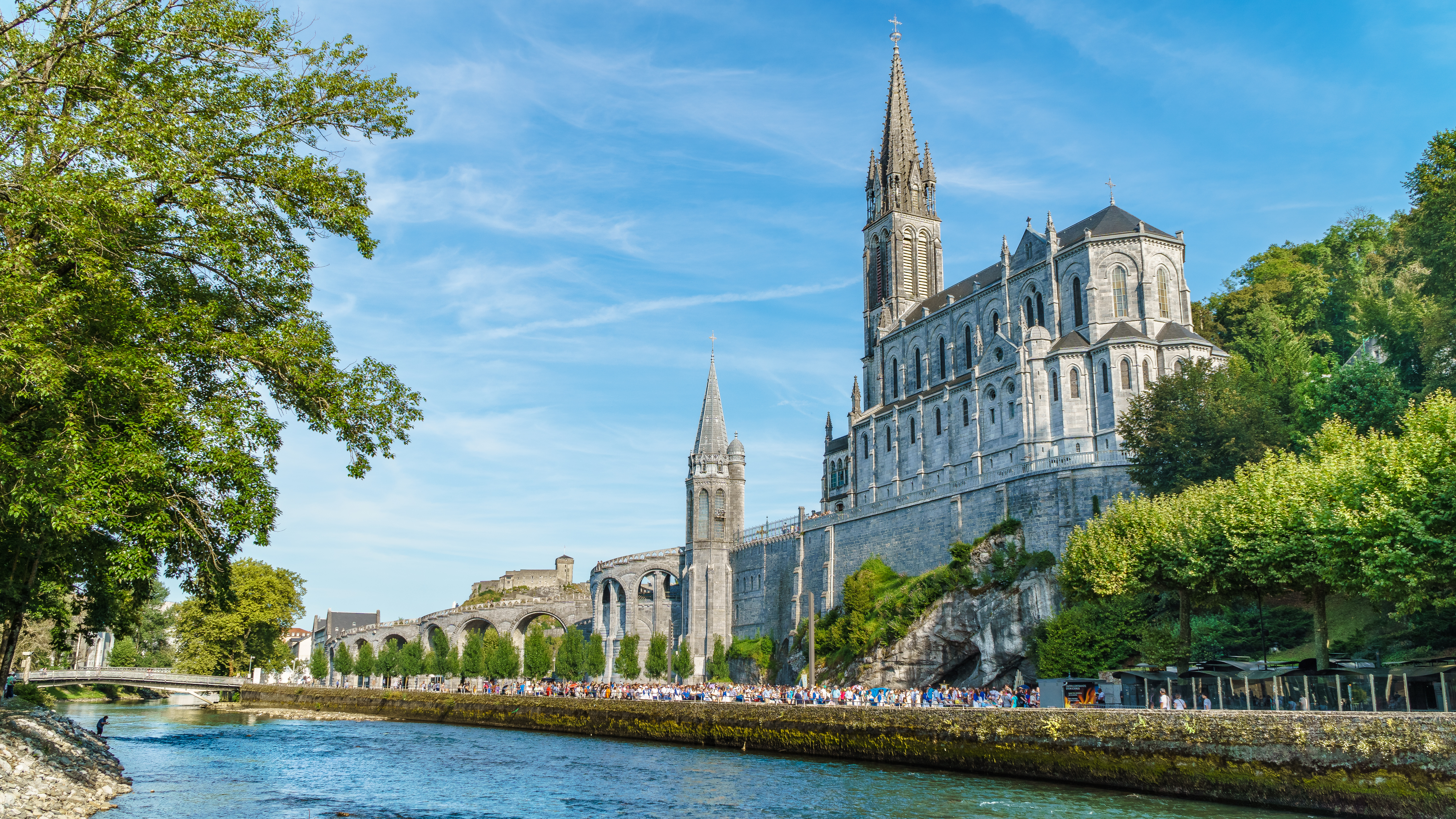
Sanctuary of Our Lady of Lourdes, Lourdes, France.

- Abbey Church of Sainte-Foy, Conques.
- Basilica of Sacré-Coeur, Montmartre.
- Basilica of the Sacred Heart of Jesus, Paray-le-Monial.
- Basilica of Sainte-Thérèse, Lisieux, Normandy. The second pilgrimage site in France after Lourdes, with over 2 million visitors per year.
- Cathedral of Notre-Dame de Paris, Île de la Cité, Paris.
- Cathedral of Our Lady of Chartres, Chartres, southwest of Paris.
- Chapel of Our Lady of the Miraculous Medal and tomb of Saint Catherine Labouré, Paris.
- Chapel of Our Lady of Pellevoisin: the site of an apparition of the Virgin Mary.
- Convent at Saint Bernadette Soubirous of Nevers: with the tomb of Saint Bernadette Soubirous.
- Lourdes: with its several churches and basilicas associated with Marian apparitions, attracting over 5 million pilgrims annually, making it one of the most visited Christian pilgrimage sites in Europe just after Rome and Fatima.
- Mount of the Glorious Cross of Dozulé, Normandy.
- Basilica of Our Lady of the Sacred Heart, Issoudun.
- Saint Trophimus' Church, Eschau.
- Sanctuary of Our Lady of Lourdes: a very important Marian apparition shrine for Catholics.
- Sanctuary of Our Lady of La Salette, La Salette-Fallavaux.
- Sanctuary of Our Lady of Laus, Saint-Étienne-le-Laus.
- Sanctuary of Our Lady of Pontmain: the site of an apparition of the Virgin Mary.
- Taizé Community: a modern ecumenical monastery that actively encourages pilgrims to visit.

==== Germany ====
- Altötting.
- Basilica of the Fourteen Holy Helpers (Basilika Vierzehnheiligen.
- Kevelaer.
- Cologne Cathedral.
- Marian pilgrimage of Neviges, Velbert.
- St Maria in der Kupfergasse, Cologne.
- Shrine of the Three Kings.
- Werl pilgrimage.

==== Hungary ====
- Máriapócs.

==== India ====
- Basilica of the Good Jesus, Goa: the site of the tomb of the missionary Saint Francis Xavier.
- Basilica of Our Lady of Good Health, Vailankanni, Tamil Nadu: a 16th-century Marian apparition site.
- Basilica of Saint Thomas, Chennai: the site of the tomb of Saint Thomas the Apostle.
- St Thomas Church, Thumpoly, Kerala.

==== Ireland ====
- Croagh Patrick mountain, County Mayo: a site associated with Saint Patrick and Reek Sunday.
- Glendalough, County Wicklow: a site associated with Saint Kevin.
- Máméan, Maumturk Mountains, County Galway: a site associated with Saint Patrick.
- Sanctuary of Our Lady of Knock, Knock, County Mayo: the site of an 1879 apparition of the Virgin Mary.
- Skellig Michael: an ancient monastic island.
- St Patrick's Purgatory, County Donegal: another site associated with Saint Patrick.

==== Italy ====
This list is organized by town because of the large number of pilgrimage sites.

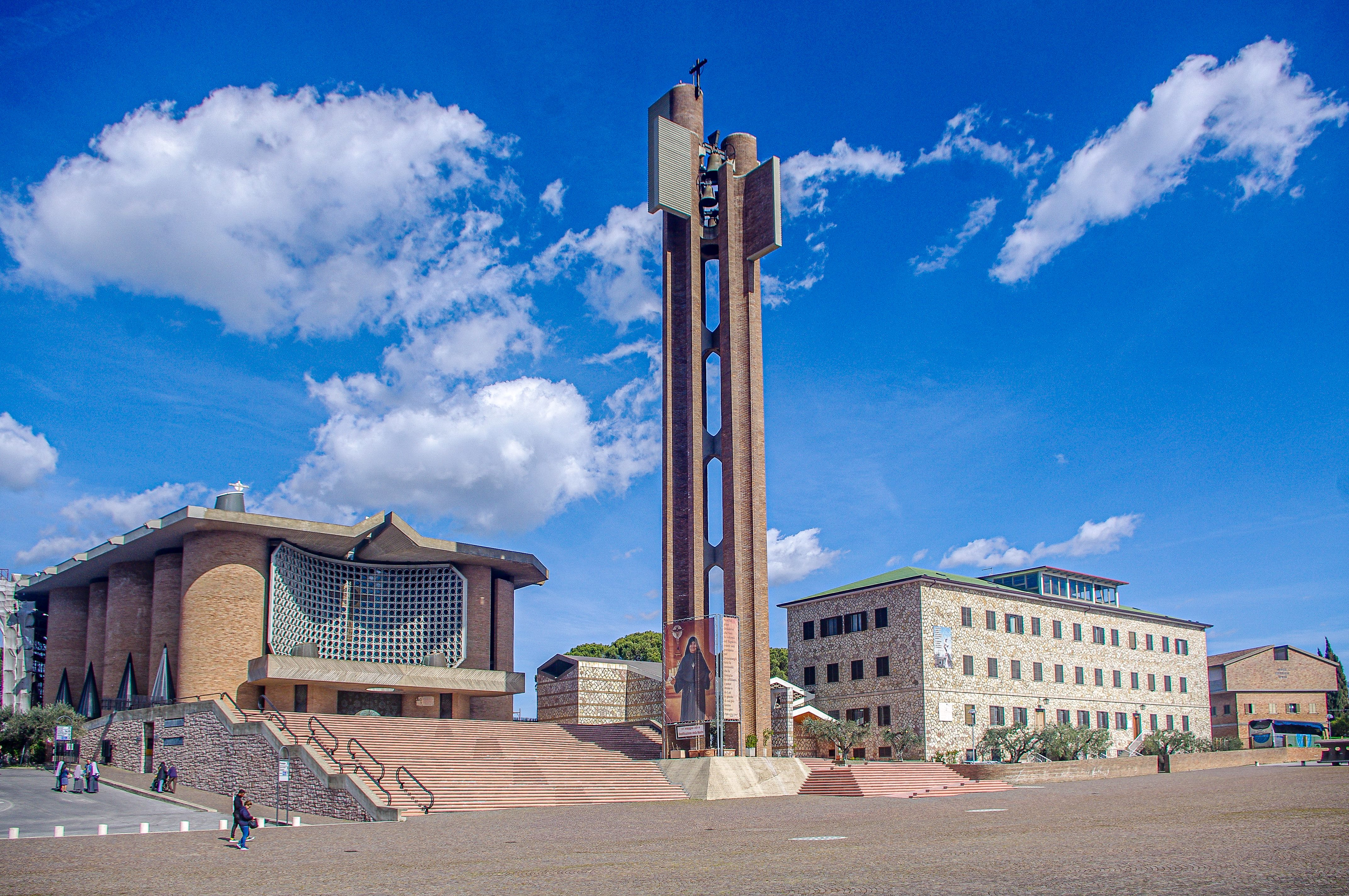
The Sanctuary of Merciful Love in Collevalenza, Italy

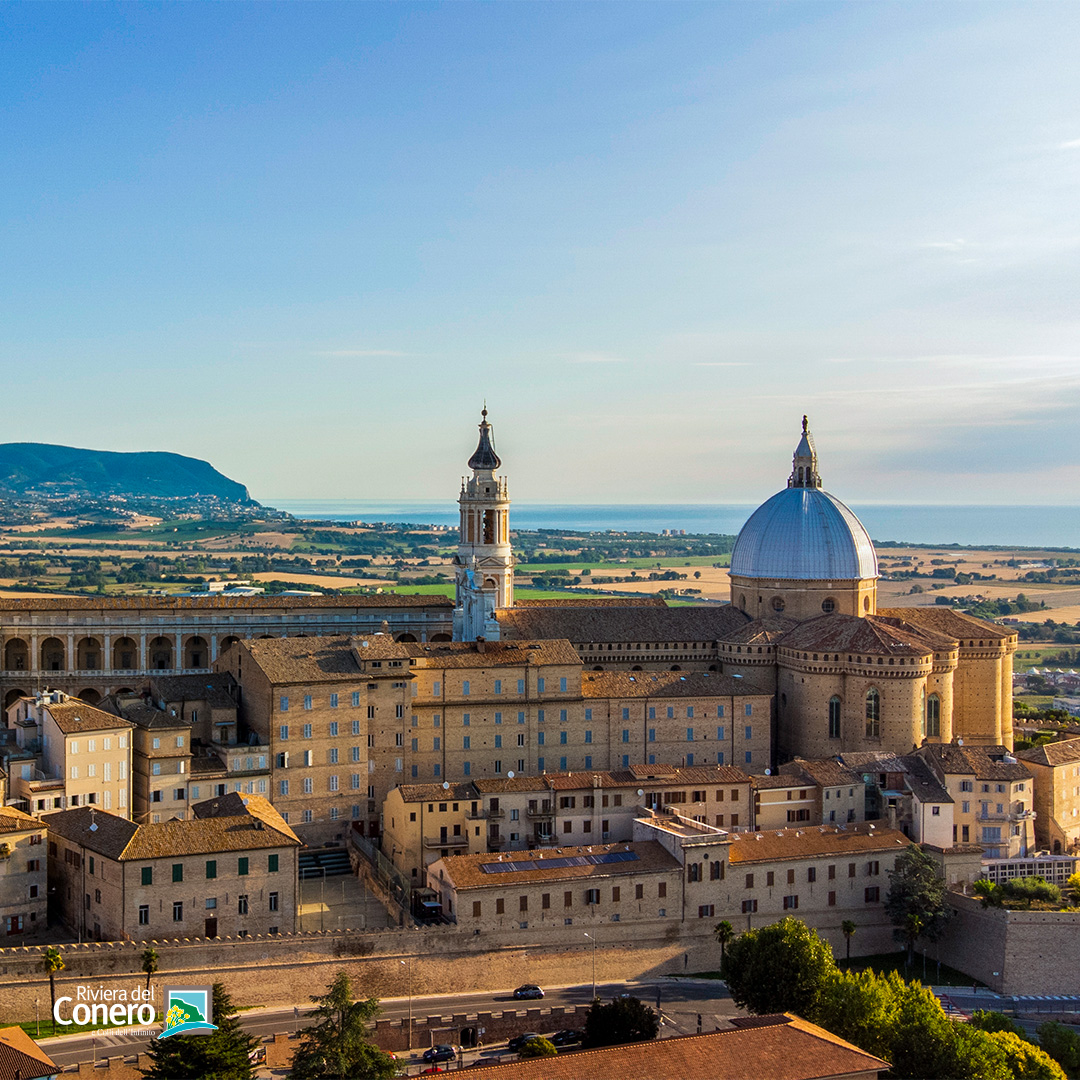
Basilica of the Holy House in Loreto, Italy

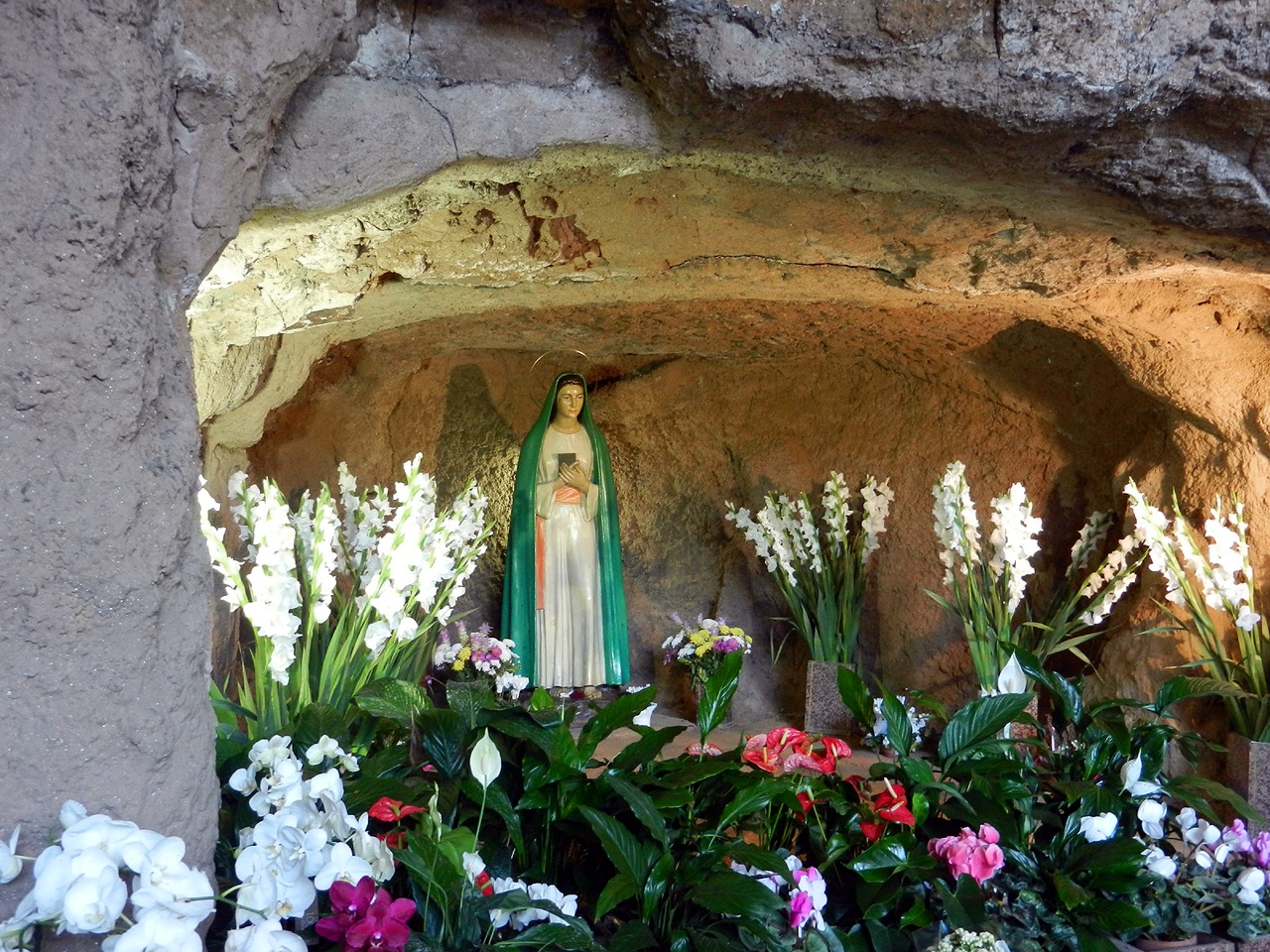
Sanctuary of the Virgin of the Revelation in Tre Fontane, Rome, Italy

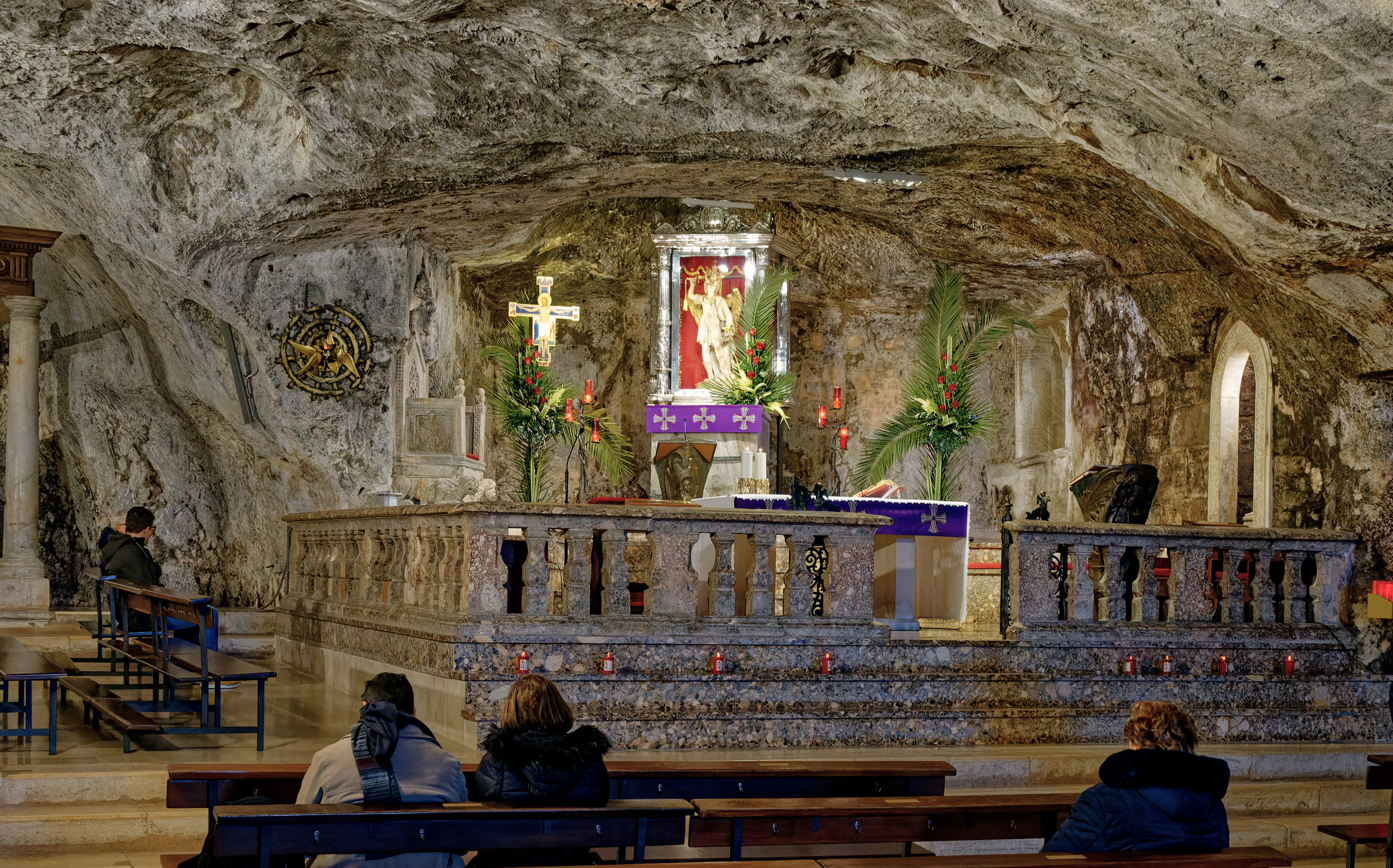
Sanctuary of St. Michael the Archangel, Mount Gargano, Italy

- Amalfi: a sanctuary of the Apostle Saint Andrew.
- Ancona: the Cathedral of Ancona (formally the Basilica Cathedral of Saint Cyriacus) holds the relics of the Apostle Saint James the Less.
- Assisi: the Basilica of Saint Francis and also the Basilica of Saint Clare.
- Cortona: Basilica of Santa Margherita, containing the incorrupt body of Saint Margaret of Cortona.
- Cascia: Basilica of Santa Rita of Cascia, containing her incorrupt body.
- Collevalenza: the Sanctuary of Merciful Love and the tomb of Blessed Mother Speranza of Jesus.
- Lanciano: the site of the famous Eucharistic miracle of Lanciano.
- Loreto: home of the Basilica of the Holy House.
- Monte Cassino: shrine and monastery of the Benedictine Monks; includes the tombs of Saint Benedict of Nursia and his sister Saint Scholastica.
- Padua:
  - Abbey of Saint Justina: a site with relics of the Apostle Saint Luke.
  - Basilica of Saint Anthony of Padua: a site with relics of Saint Anthony of Padua.
- Pavia: the site of the tomb of Saint Augustine of Hippo at the church of San Pietro in Ciel d'Oro.
- Pietrelcina: the birthplace of Saint Padre Pio.
- Rome:
  - Birthplaces of saints, such as Saint Paula of Rome and her daughters.
  - Church of Saint Jerome of the Charity: place where Saint Jerome lived while he translated the Bible into Latin (the Vulgate).
  - Colosseum: the site of the deaths of early Christian martyrs .
  - Papal basilicas with important relics:
    - Archbasilica of Saint John Lateran.
    - Basilica of Saint Peter in the Vatican.
    - Basilica of Saint Paul Outside the Walls.
    - Basilica of Saint Mary Major.
    - Basilica of Saint Lawrence Outside the Walls.
  - Scala Sancta: the Holy Stairs were the steps leading up to the praetorium of Pontius Pilate in Jerusalem on which Jesus Christ stepped on his way to trial during his Passion.
  - Sanctuary of the Virgin of the Revelation: known by the Tre Fontane Grotto where the Virgin Mary appeared in 1947.
  - Sanctuaries of many saints, such as Ignatius of Loyola (Church of the Most Holy Name of Jesus).
- Sacri Monti, the Sacred Mountains of Piedmont and Lombardy.
- Salerno, Campania: a shrine of the Apostle Saint Matthew.
- San Giovanni Rotondo: Sanctuary of Saint Pio of Pietrelcina: the shrine of Saint Padre Pio.
- Sanctuary of Saint Michael the Archangel, Mount Gargano, province of Foggia: the place of a famous apparition of the Archangel Saint Michael.
- Sanctuary of the Mystical Rose, Fontanelle (Montichiari): the site of a Marian apparition.
- Turin:
  - Basilica of Our Lady Help of Christians.
  - Turin Cathedral, home of the Shroud of Turin.
- Vatican City: the site of Saint Peter's Basilica, relics of various saints, relics of the Passion of Christ, and headquarters of the Roman Catholic Church.
- Venice: the shrine of the Apostle Saint Mark, patron saint of Venice.
- Viterbo: Church of Saint Giacinta Marescotti, containing relics of Saint Hyacintha Mariscotti.

==== Latvia ====
- Basilica of the Assumption, Aglona.

==== Lithuania ====
- Basilica of the Nativity of the Blessed Virgin Mary, Šiluva.
- Divine Mercy Sanctuary, Vilnius: the site of the first Divine Mercy image.
- Hill of Crosses, near Šiauliai.
- Our Lady of the Gate of Dawn, Vilnius.
- Vilnius Cathedral: a site with relics of Saint Casimir.
- Žemaičių Kalvarija, Samogitia.

==== Netherlands ====
- Chapel of Our Lady, Echt, Limburg.
- (Heilige Stede) Holy Site, Amsterdam.
- Kapel in 't Zand, Roermond of Limburg.
- Lourdesgrot or Lourdes Grotto: the site of a 1:13-scale replica of the Sanctuary of Our Lady of Lourdes of Massabielle, France, found in the Lourdeskapel (Scheveningen), The Hague-Scheveningen, Netherlands.

==== Norway ====
- Shrine of Saint Olav, Trondheim (formerly Nidaros): the 4th-most-visited pilgrimage site in the Middle Ages.

==== Poland ====
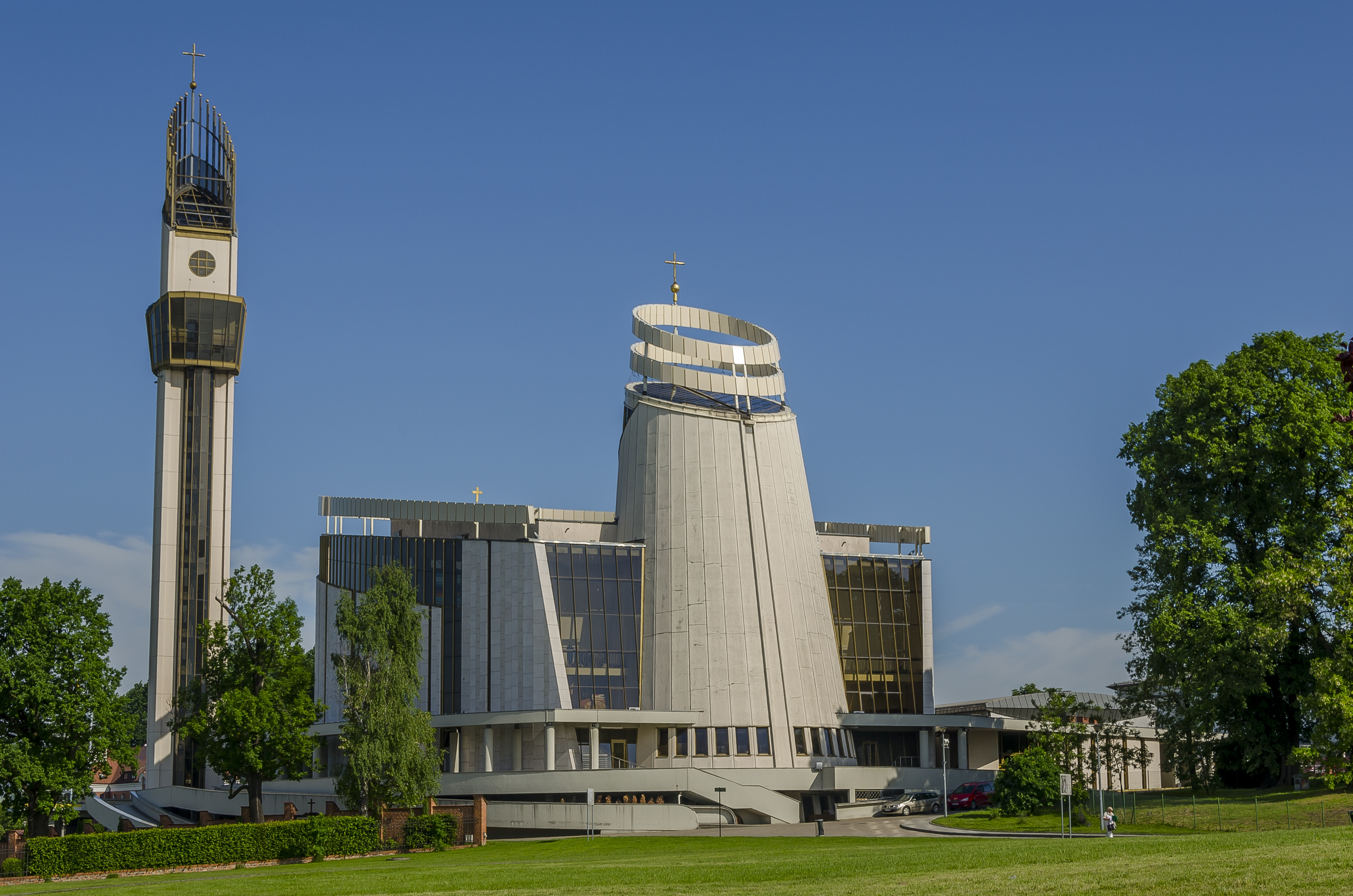
Divine Mercy Sanctuary, Kraków, global center of devotion to Divine Mercy, Poland.

- Jasna Góra Monastery, Częstochowa: the site at which the Black Madonna of Częstochowa is housed permanently, attracting 4 to 5 million pilgrims annually.
- Sanctuary of Our Lady of Licheń, Licheń Stary: home of the miraculous image known as the Sorrowful Queen of Poland (Bolesna Królowa Polski), attracting over a million pilgrims annually.
- Divine Mercy Sanctuary in Kraków: the global center of Divine Mercy, with the most popular version of Divine Mercy image as well as the grave of Saint Faustina Kowalska, attracting millions of pilgrims from all around the world.
- Góra Świętej Anny.
- Kalwaria Zebrzydowska.
- Matka Boska Kębelska, Wąwolnica.
- Sanctuary of Our Lady of Ludźmierz, Ludźmierz.
- Sanctuary of St Hedwig, Trzebnica.
- Supraśl Lavra.
- Święta Lipka.
- Wambierzyce.

==== Portugal ====
Sanctuary of Our Lady of Fátima, in Fátima's Cova da Iria quarter, Portugal

- Church-Shrine of the Most Holy Miracle, Santarém: a pilgrimage destination to those who want to contemplate the famous Eucharistic miracle that occurred in Portugal.
- Church-Shrine of the Sacred Heart of Jesus, Ermesinde: an important pilgrimage destination to the tomb with the incorrupt body of Blessed Mary of the Divine Heart Droste zu Vischering, a German noblewoman and Religious sister.
- Eucharistic shrine of Balazar: an important pilgrimage destination since the 20th century due to the Portuguese mystic Alexandrina Maria da Costa, who died in 1955 and was beatified by Pope John Paul II.
- Sanctuary of Christ the King: a famous Catholic monument and shrine dedicated to the Sacred Heart of Jesus Christ, place of many pilgrimages.
- Sanctuary of Our Lady of Fátima: one of the largest Marian shrine in the world. Our Lady of Fátima is the title given to the Blessed Virgin Mary according to her apparitions to three shepherd children at Cova da Iria, on the 13th day for six consecutive months in 1917, attracting about 20 million pilgrims annually.
- Sanctuary of Our Lady of Nazaré: a Marian shrine memorializing an ancient miracle.
- Sanctuary of Our Lady of Sameiro: an important shrine dedicated to the veneration of the Immaculate Conception of the Blessed Virgin Mary, visited by Pope John Paul II to promote this.

==== Spain ====
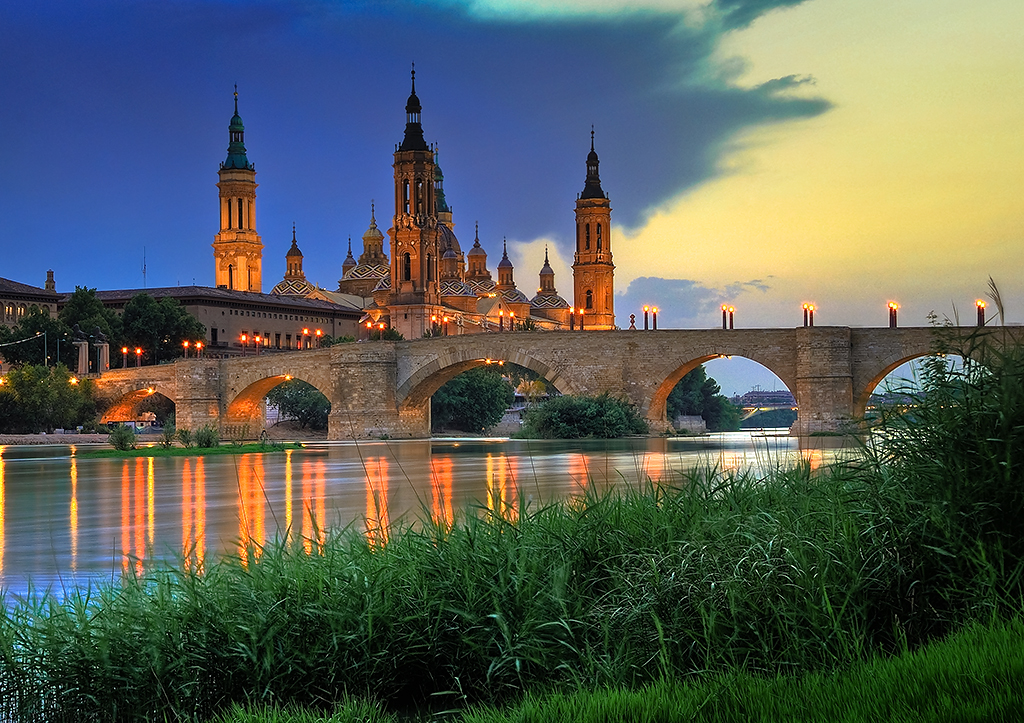
Cathedral-Basilica of Our Lady of the Pillar, in Zaragoza, Spain

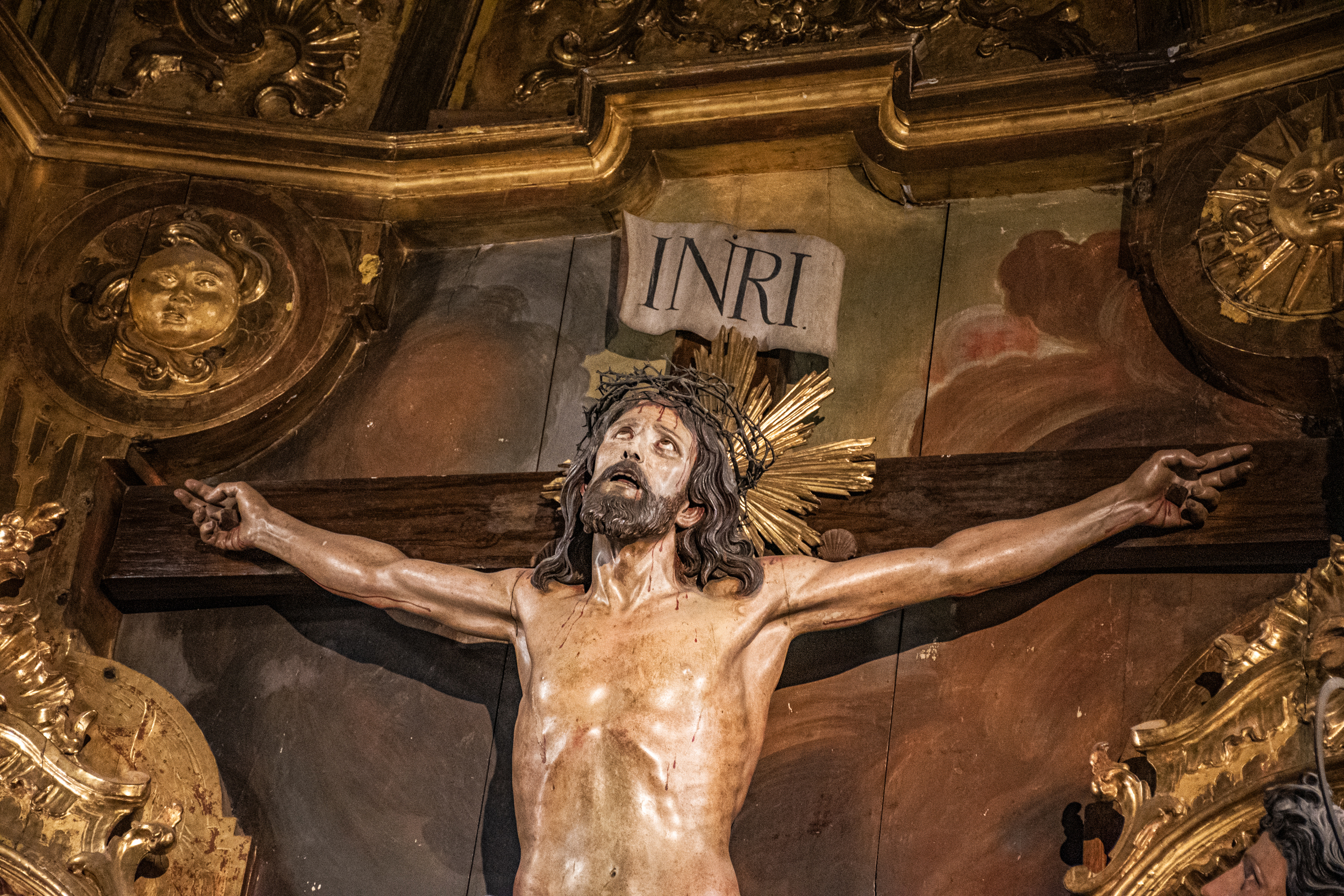
The Holy Christ of Agony, Limpias, Spain: the miraculous crucifix where Jesus appeared alive on the cross

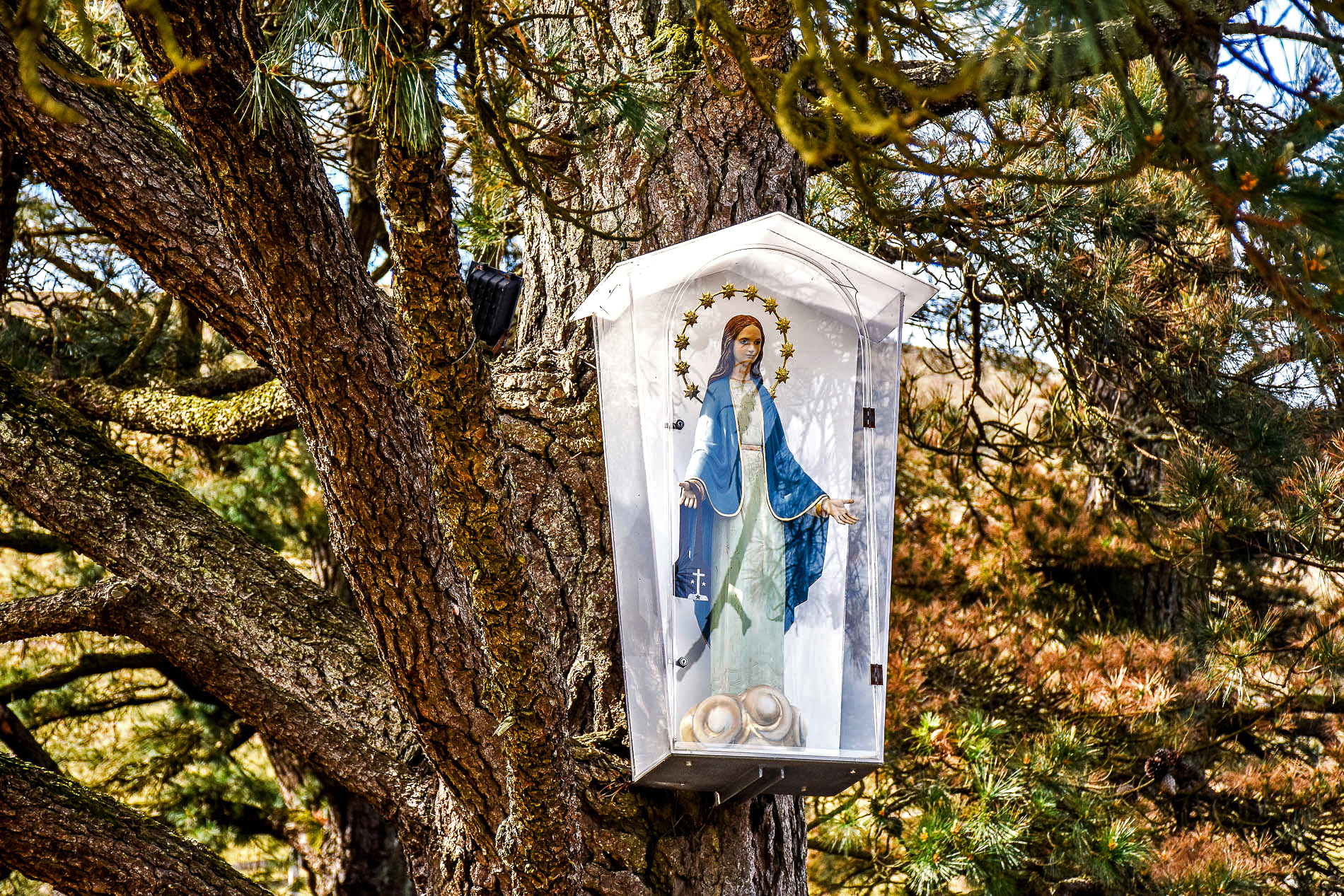
Our Lady of Garabandal, a pilgrimage site in Cantabria region, Northern Spain

- Ávila: the birthplace of Saint Teresa of Jesus and first foundation of a convent of Discalced Carmelite nuns.
- Basilica and Sanctuary of Our Lady of Candelaria, Tenerife, Canary Islands: a shrine dedicated of the Virgin Mary as patron saint of the Canary Islands.
- Basilica of Caravaca de la Cruz, in the region of Murcia.Basilica of Jesus of the Great Power, Seville.
- Basilica of Jesus of Medinaceli, Madrid.
- Basilica of Our Lady of the Pillar, Zaragoza: reputed to be the first church dedicated to the Virgin Mary in history.
- Monastery of Santo Toribio de Liébana, Cantabria.
- Royal Monastery of Santa Maria de Guadalupe, Guadalupe, Cáceres.
- San Sebastián de Garabandal: a rural village in the Cantabrian mountains where the famous apparitions of Our Lady of Mount Carmel and Saint Michael the Archangel occurred.
- Sanctuary of Chandavila: a Marian shrine dedicated to the apparitions of Our Lady of Sorrows in La Codosera, province of Badajoz.
- Sanctuary of Onuva: a Marian shrine dedicated to the apparitions of Our Lady of Graces near La Puebla del Río, province of Seville.
- Sanctuary of Our Lady of Umbe: a Marian shrine dedicated to the apparitions of Our Lady of Sorrows in Umbe, near Bilbao, Biscay
- Sanctuary of the Holy Christ of Agony, Limpias, Cantabria: shrine with the miraculous crucifix where Jesus appeared alive on the cross.
- Sanctuary of Our Lady of Covadonga: a significant Marian shrine situated in the Peaks of Europe range of mountains, Asturias.
- Santiago de Compostela, Galicia, on the Camino de Santiago (Way of St James) (Galician: O Camiño de Santiago): this famous medieval pilgrimage to the shrine of Saint James is still popular today.
- Virgin of Montserrat, Montserrat, Catalonia: a statue of the Madonna and Child housed permanently in the Monastery of Santa Maria de Montserrat.
- Way of Saint James: the pilgrimage route to the Cathedral of Santiago de Compostela in Galicia in northwestern Spain, where according to tradition the remains of the Apostle Saint James are buried.

==== Romania ====
- Miercurea Ciuc, Transylvania: Whitsunday gathering of mostly ethnic Hungarian Catholics.

==== Slovakia ====
===== Greek Catholic =====
- Basilica minor of the Dormition of the Mother of God of Ľutina: the largest Greek Catholic pilgrimage in Slovakia, held every August 15.

===== Roman Catholic =====
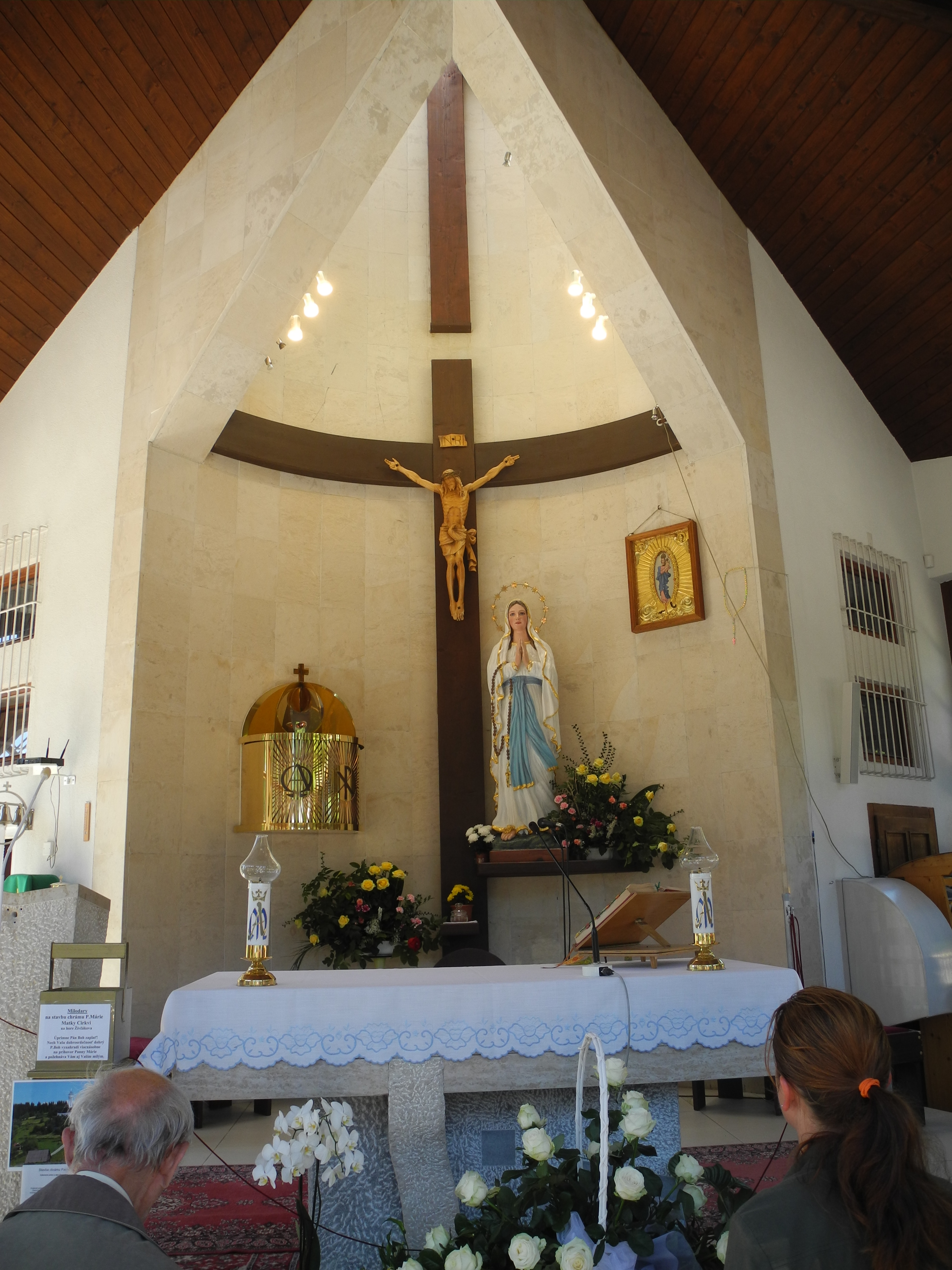
Marian shrine in Turzovka, Slovakia.

- Gaboltov: a Marian site.
- Korňa-Živčákova: a Marian site.
- Levoča-Mariánska hora: a Marian site with the largest pilgrimage in Slovakia, held every first Sunday in July, for which the 1995 attendance of 650,000 was the largest number of participants for any event in Slovak history.
- Litmanová: a site of a Marian apparition; shrine dedicated to the Immaculate Purity.
- Marianka.
- Nitrianska Blatnica.
- Skalka nad Váhom.
- Šaštín: the site of a national pilgrimage every September 15 to the patron saint of Slovakia, the Virgin Mary.
- Turzovka: place of Marian apparitions.
- Úhorná: pilgrimages every August 5.

==== Switzerland ====
- Einsiedeln.

==== United Kingdom ====
===== England =====
- Bromholm Priory: a site where a piece of the True Cross is claimed to be held.
- Bury St Edmunds Abbey: a site associated with Saint Edmund the Martyr.
- Canterbury Cathedral: a site associated with Saint Thomas Becket.
- Church of St Peter's-on-the-Wall Bradwell-on-Sea: the oldest church in England (Saint Cedd).
- Glastonbury: Saint Joseph of Arimathea.
- Durham Cathedral: the site of the relics of Saint Cuthbert.
- Hailes Abbey: a site where a vial of the Blood of Christ is claimed to be held.
- Lindisfarne: the site from which Saint Cuthbert's remains were removed in 875 and transferred to Durham Cathedral in 1104
- Peak Pilgrimage, Peak District: a pilgrimage from Ilam, Staffordshire, a place of pilgrimage since the Saxon saint and hermit Saint Bertram, to St Lawrence's Church, Eyam, Derbyshire.
- St Albans Cathedral: a site associated with the country's first martyr, Saint Alban.
- Walsingham, North Norfolk: the site of an apparition of the Virgin Mary.
- Waltham Abbey, Essex: the medieval site of the Holy Cross of Waltham.
- Wesley's Chapel, London: the mother church for Methodism, includes a museum and John Wesley's House next to the chapel.
- Winchester Cathedral, Hampshire: a siteassociated with Saint Swithun.

===== Northern Ireland =====
- Struell Wells: a site traditionally associated with Saint Patrick.

===== Scotland =====
- Carfin Grotto, Carfin: the national Marian shrine of Scotland, modeled after the grotto in Lourdes.
- Iona: an island off the west coast of Scotland that is the centre of Gaelic monasticism, associated with Saint Columba.
- St Andrews Cathedral, Fife: the site of some of the remains of Saint Andrew the Apostle, and focus of a recently revived pilgrimage tradition, The Way of St Andrews.

===== Wales =====
- Bardsey Island: the site of numerous relics of local saints, including Saint Cadfan.
- Holywell, Flintshire: St Winefride's Well is claimed to be the oldest continuously operating pilgrimage site in Great Britain.
- Penrhys, county borough of Rhondda Cynon Taf: an important pilgrimage center since the medieval period for the area, known for Ffynnon Fair (English: Mary's Well), a well that still exists. Its chapel, shrine, and hostelry were created to accommodate the large number of pilgrims.
- St David's, Pembrokeshire: a pilgrimage site since the canonization of Saint David, patron saint of Wales, in the 12th century.

== New World ==
Pilgrimage sites in parts of the world reached by Christianity in the early modern or modern era, including the Americas, Sub-Saharan Africa, and Southeast and East Asia.

=== Sub-Saharan Africa ===
==== Rwanda ====
- Our Lady of Kibeho, Kibeho: attracting about 25,000–30,000 visitors per year.

==== Uganda ====
- Basilica of the Uganda Martyrs, Namugongo, Wakiso District.

=== East and Southeast Asia ===
==== Japan ====
- Our Lady of Akita: the site of a Marian apparition.
- Twenty-Six Martyrs Museum and Monument: the site of the execution of 26 Japanese Christians in 1597.

==== South Korea ====
- Seoul Martyrs Way.

==== Indonesia ====
- Sendangsono, Central Java: the first native Javan, baptised by Rv. Van Lith, SJ.

==== Malaysia ====
- St Anne's Church, Bukit Mertajam, Penang.
- Church Camp and Mount Murud, Limbang, Sarawak.

==== Philippines ====
- Divine Mercy Shrine, El Salvador, Misamis Oriental.
- National Shrine of Our Mother of Perpetual Help.
- Our Lady of Manaoag.
- Our Lady of Peñafrancia, Naga, Camarines Sur .
- Quiapo Church: home of the Black Nazarene, a statue of Jesus.
- Simala Shrine, Sibonga.

==== Vietnam ====
- Our Lady of La Vang: the site of a Marian apparition.

=== Latin America ===
==== Argentina ====
- Basilica of Our Lady of Luján, Buenos Aires Province.

==== Brazil ====
- Basilica of the Shrine of Our Lady of Aparecida: one of the largest churches in the world, attracting about 8 million visitors per year.

==== Costa Rica ====
- Basilica of Our Lady of the Angels, Cartago: the site of a large pilgrimage of people who walk from all around the country with the goal of arriving there on 2 August, the feast day of Our Lady of the Angels of the Portiuncula, on which the Portiuncula Indulgence may be gained; also a national holiday due to the pilgrimage.

==== Mexico ====
- Basilica of Our Lady of Guadalupe, Mexico City: one of the largest churches in the world, accommodating 40,000 people for Mass, and attracting about 20 million pilgrims per year.
- Basilica of San Juan de los Lagos, San Juan de los Lagos, Jalisco: the site of a small image of the Virgin Mary called Our Lady of San Juan de los Lagos.
- Cerro del Cubilete (Dice Cup Hill), Silao, Guanajuato: attracting 5 million people annually to see the statue of Christ the King at the top of the hill, 82 ft (25 m) high.
- Hermosa Provincia Temple, Guadalajara, Jalisco: the main temple of the followers of the La Luz del Mundo (Light of the World) nontrinitarian denomination.
- Holy Infant of Atocha, Fresnillo, Zacatecas.
- Sanctuary of Chalma, Ocuilan, State of Mexico.
- Santa Catarina Juquila, Oaxaca.
- Our Lady of the Rosary, Talpa de Allende, Jalisco.
- Zapopan, Jalisco.

==== Honduras ====
- Basilica of Our Lady of Suyapa (Spanish: Basílica de Nuestra Señora de Suyapa or Basílica de Suyapa), Tegucigalpa: dedicated to the Marian apparition of Our Lady of Suyapa, attracting approximately 1.2 million pilgrims each year on 3 February; also the largest church in Honduras.

==== Guatemala ====
- Catedral basílica de Esquipulas, Esquipulas.
- Nuestra Señora de la Merced, Antigua Guatemala.

=== North America ===
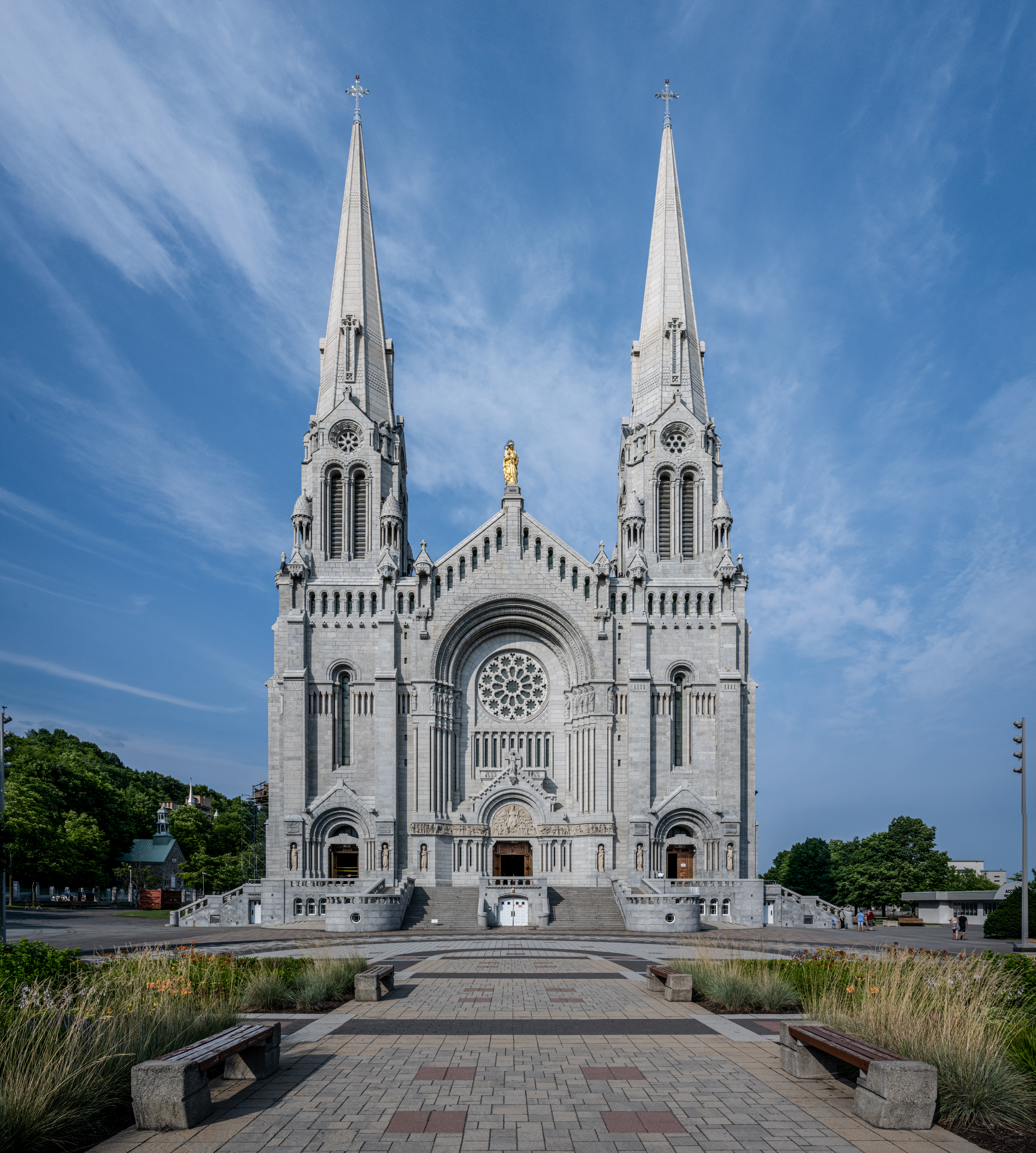
Basilica of Sainte-Anne-de-Beaupré, Quebec, Canada.

==== Canada ====
- Basilica of Sainte-Anne-de-Beaupré, Quebec: a site associated with miraculous healings.
- Lac Ste. Anne Pilgrimage, Alberta: the largest annual Catholic gathering in Western Canada, which attracts thousands of people every July.
- Cap-de-la-Madeleine, Quebec: in honour of Our Lady of the Cape.
- Martyrs' Shrine, Ontario: shrine dedicated to the memory of the Canadian Martyrs, eight French Jesuit missionaries.

==== United States ====
===== Catholic =====
- Basilica of Mary, Queen of the Universe, Orlando, Florida.
- Basilica of the National Shrine of the Immaculate Conception, Washington, DC.
- Basilica and National Shrine of Our Lady of Consolation, Carey, Ohio; Catholic pilgrims from the Middle East journey here to mark the Feast of the Assumption.
- Basilica of the National Shrine of Our Lady of Fatima, Lewiston, New York.
- Black Madonna Shrine, Eureka, Missouri.
- El Camino Real trail, California: 21 mission churches founded by Franciscan priests between 1769 and 1833, particularly the Mission San Carlos Borromeo de Carmelo in Carmel and the Mission San Diego de Alcalá in San Diego.
- El Santuario de Chimayo, New Mexico.
- Immaculata Church, Cincinnati, Ohio: a pilgrimage church where Catholics journey on Good Friday to "Pray the Steps," walking up 150 steps from the Ohio River to the top of Mount Adams while saying a prayer at each step.
- Mission San Xavier del Bac, Tucson, Arizona.
- National Shrine of St Elizabeth Ann Seton, Emmitsburg, Maryland.
- National Shrine of the Divine Mercy, Stockbridge, Massachusetts: dedicated to Divine Mercy.
- National Shrine Grotto of Our Lady of Lourdes, Emmitsburg, Maryland.
- National Shrine of Our Lady of Champion, Champion, Wisconsin: the site of a Marian apparition.
- National Shrine of Our Lady of Czestochowa, Doylestown, Pennsylvania.
- National Shrine of North American Martyrs, Auriesville, New York.
- Our Lady of Victory Basilica, Lackawanna, New York.
- Shrine of Our Lady of Guadalupe, La Crosse, Wisconsin.
- Shrine of Our Lady of Mariapoch, Burton, Ohio: a place of pilgrimage for Byzantine and Hungarian-American Catholics.

===== Eastern Orthodox =====
- Spruce Island, Alaska: the hermitage of St Herman of Alaska.

===== Church of Jesus Christ of Latter-day Saints =====
- Kirtland Temple, Kirtland, Ohio: the first temple built by the Church of Jesus Christ of Latter-Day Saints (LDS).
- Nauvoo Temple, Nauvoo, Illinois: the second LDS temple.
- Salt Lake Temple, Salt Lake City, Utah: the largest LDS temple by floor area, and where the First Presidency and Quorum of the Twelve meet.
