= Sibonga =

Municipality in Cebu, Philippines

- Municipality
- Municipality of Sibonga
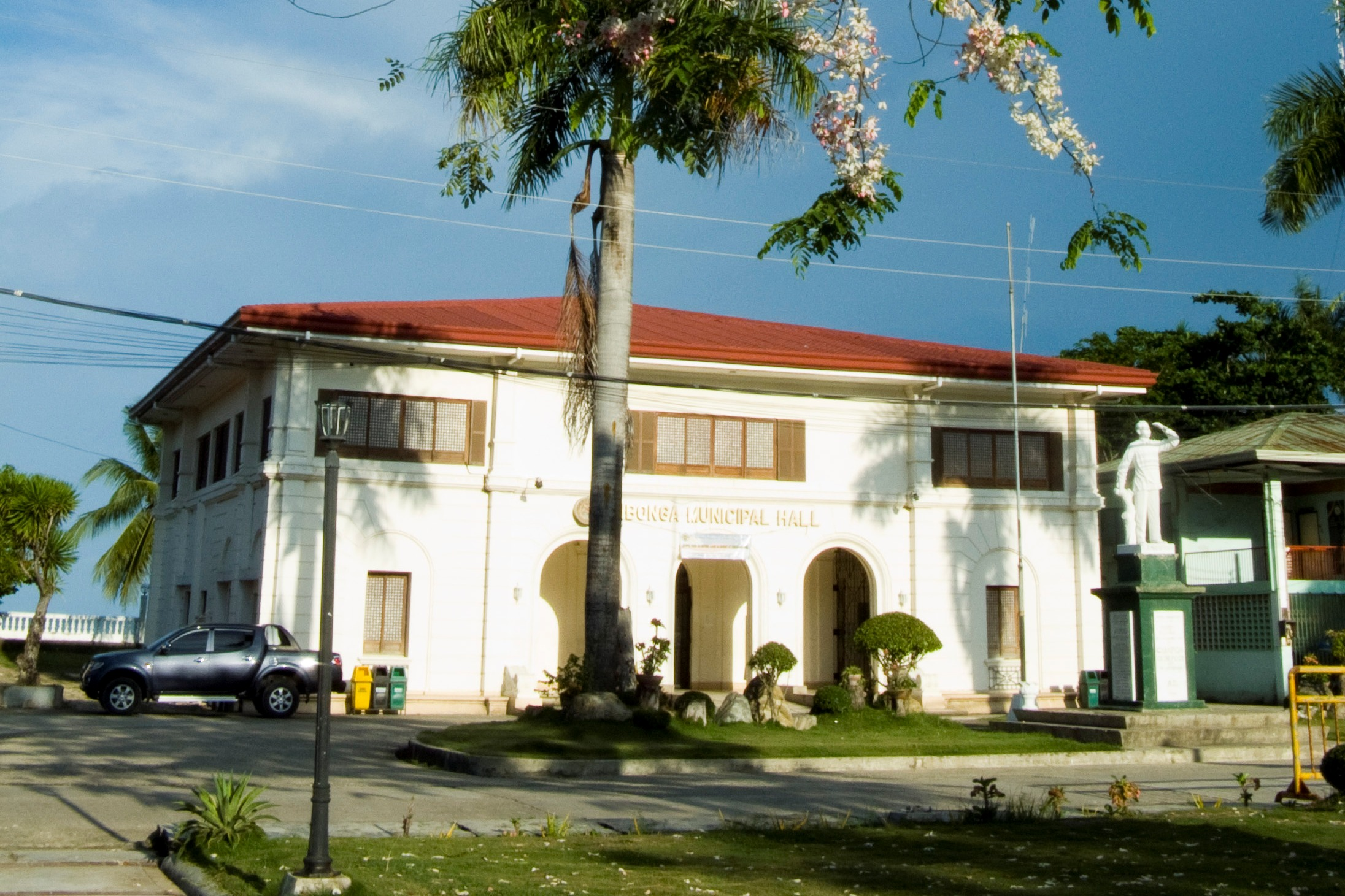
- Sibonga Municipal Hall

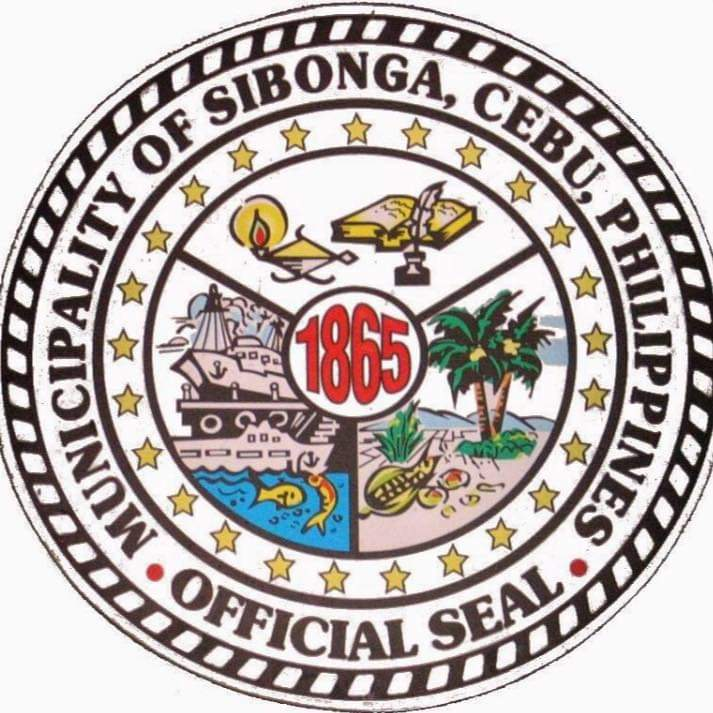
- Seal
- Anthem: Sibonga hymn
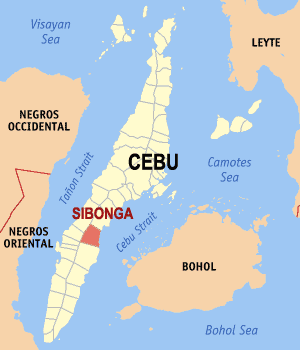
- Map of Cebu with Sibonga highlighted
- Interactive map of Sibonga
- Location within the Philippines
- Coordinates: 10°02′N 123°34′E
- Country: Philippines
- Region: Central Visayas
- Province: Cebu
- District: 1st district
- Barangays: 25 (see Barangays)

Government
  - Type: Sangguniang Bayan
  - Mayor: Caroline Bacaltos (NP)
  - Vice Mayor: Mariano Laude (NP)
  - Representative: Rhea Mae A. Gullas
  - Municipal Council: Members: Caroline S. Bacaltos; Cirilo P. Apuda; Noel H. Ponce; Mary Joejie P. Chan; Daniel S. Sarnillo; Fortunato S. Diez Jr.; Ramon Paul P. Pananganan; Lorraine Khate Bacaltos
  - Electorate: 34,444 voters (2025)

Area
  - Total: 133.45 km^{2} (51.53 sq mi)
- Elevation: 79 m (259 ft)
- Highest elevation: 666 m (2,185 ft)
- Lowest elevation: 0 m (0 ft)

Population (2024 census)
  - Total: 54,610
  - Density: 409.2/km^{2} (1,060/sq mi)
  - Households: 12,457

Economy
  - Income class: 1st municipal income class
  - Poverty incidence: 22.65% (2023)
  - Revenue: ₱ 185.8 million (2021)
  - Assets: ₱ 841.1 million (2021)
  - Expenditure: ₱ 133.9 million (2021)
  - Liabilities: ₱ 260.7 million (2021)

Service provider
  - Electricity: Cebu 1 Electric Cooperative (CEBECO 1)
- Time zone: UTC+8 (PST)
- ZIP code: 6020
- PSGC: 072246000
- IDD : area code: +63 (0)32
- Native languages: Cebuano; Tagalog

Sibonga, officially the Municipality of Sibonga (Cebuano: Lungsod sa Sibonga; Tagalog: Bayan ng Sibonga), is a municipality in the province of Cebu, Philippines. According to the 2024 census, it has a population of 54,610 people.

== Geography ==
Sibonga is bordered to the north by the city of Carcar, to the west are the towns of Barili and Dumanjug, to the east is the Cebu Strait, and to the south is the town of Argao. It is 50 kilometres (31 mi) from Cebu City.

=== Barangays ===
Sibonga is politically subdivided into 25 barangays. Each barangay consists of puroks and some have sitios.

PSGC	Barangay	Population			±% p.a.	
		2024		2010		
072246001	Abugon	4.0%	2,208	1,903	▴	1.04%
072246002	Bae	2.5%	1,375	983	▴	2.36%
072246003	Bagacay	5.1%	2,805	2,074	▴	2.12%
072246004	Bahay	10.3%	5,646	4,476	▴	1.63%
072246005	Banlot	3.6%	1,980	1,612	▴	1.44%
072246006	Basak	2.2%	1,195	927	▴	1.78%
072246007	Bato	2.8%	1,531	1,297	▴	1.16%
072246008	Cagay	1.9%	1,021	813	▴	1.60%
072246009	Can‑aga	1.9%	1,037	776	▴	2.04%
072246010	Candaguit	4.6%	2,513	2,216	▴	0.88%
072246011	Cantolaroy	1.3%	729	567	▴	1.76%
072246012	Dugoan	1.5%	841	590	▴	2.49%
072246013	Guimbangco‑an	2.0%	1,109	788	▴	2.40%
072246014	Lamacan	3.5%	1,889	1,563	▴	1.33%
072246015	Libo	2.2%	1,191	987	▴	1.31%
072246016	Lindogon	3.5%	1,931	1,563	▴	1.48%
072246017	Magcagong	2.2%	1,191	906	▴	1.92%
072246018	Manatad	3.5%	1,928	1,543	▴	1.56%
072246019	Mangyan	4.3%	2,369	1,952	▴	1.35%
072246020	Papan	1.7%	917	673	▴	2.17%
072246021	Poblacion	13.3%	7,257	5,597	▴	1.82%
072246022	Sabang	5.3%	2,912	2,397	▴	1.36%
072246023	Sayao	3.7%	2,020	1,507	▴	2.06%
072246024	Simala	6.2%	3,388	3,991	▾	−1.13%
072246025	Tubod	4.5%	2,441	2,177	▴	0.80%
	Total		54,610	43,641	▴	1.57%

=== Climate ===
Climate data for Sibonga, Cebu
Month	Jan	Feb	Mar	Apr	May	Jun	Jul	Aug	Sep	Oct	Nov	Dec	Year
Mean daily maximum °C (°F)	29 (84)	30 (86)	31 (88)	32 (90)	31 (88)	30 (86)	30 (86)	30 (86)	30 (86)	29 (84)	29 (84)	29 (84)	30 (86)
Mean daily minimum °C (°F)	23 (73)	22 (72)	23 (73)	24 (75)	25 (77)	25 (77)	24 (75)	24 (75)	24 (75)	24 (75)	24 (75)	23 (73)	24 (75)
Average precipitation mm (inches)	42 (1.7)	34 (1.3)	40 (1.6)	61 (2.4)	124 (4.9)	188 (7.4)	190 (7.5)	191 (7.5)	189 (7.4)	186 (7.3)	124 (4.9)	73 (2.9)	1,442 (56.8)
Average rainy days	10.0	8.5	9.5	12.8	22.3	26.8	28.4	27.9	27.3	27.6	20.5	13.1	234.7
Source: Meteoblue

== Demographics ==
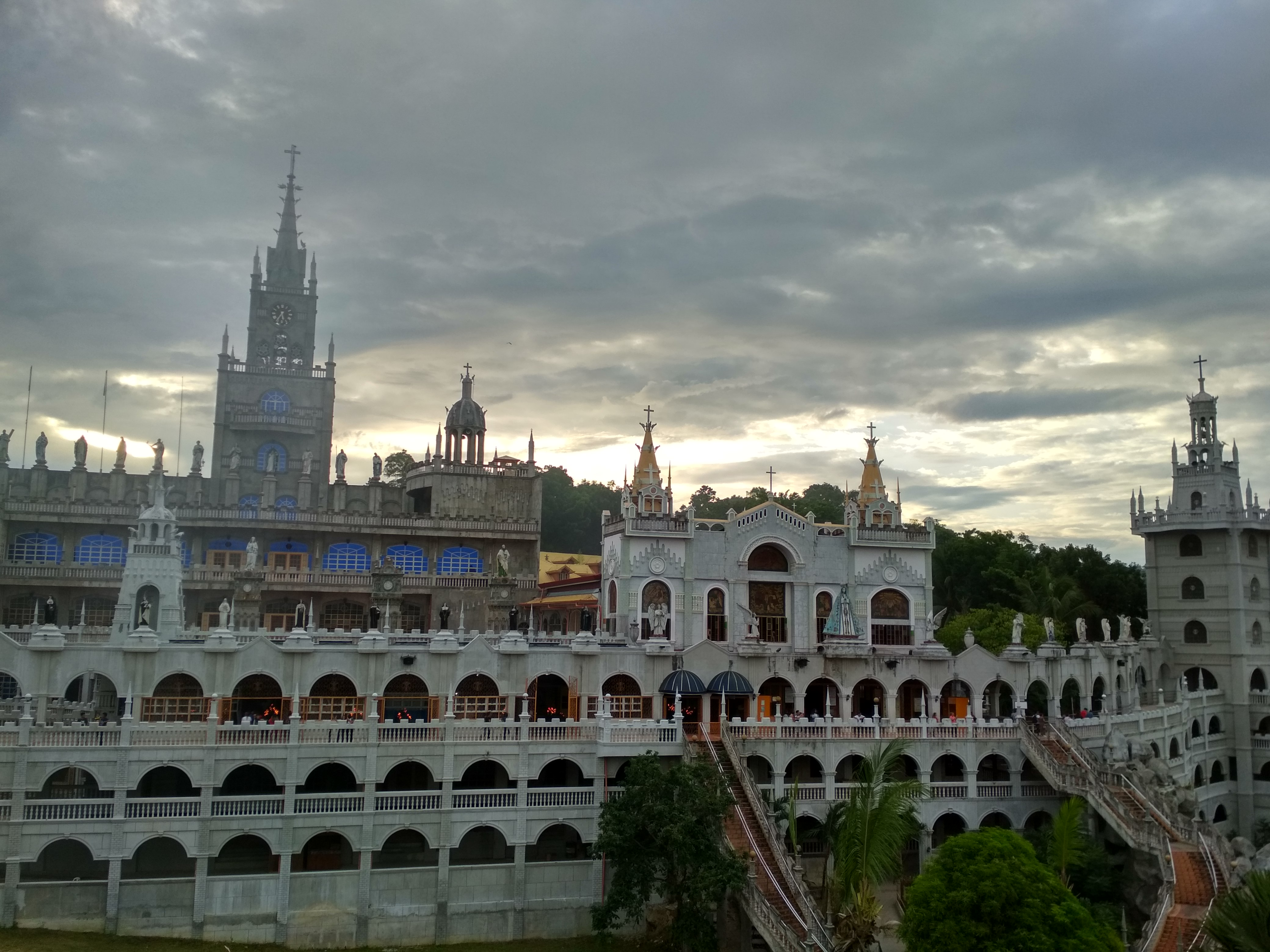
The Monastery of the Holy Eucharist, also known as the Miraculous Mama Mary Shrine, the Shrine of Simala, or the Simala-Lindogon Church.

Population census of Sibonga
Year	Pop.	±% p.a.
1903	25,848	—
1918	27,199	+0.34%
1939	21,803	−1.05%
1948	19,230	−1.39%
1960	19,516	+0.12%
1970	22,212	+1.30%
1975	24,510	+1.99%
1980	27,513	+2.34%
1990	33,083	+1.86%
1995	35,897	+1.54%
2000	38,281	+1.39%
2007	40,765	+0.87%
2010	43,641	+2.51%
2015	48,186	+1.90%
2020	53,424	+2.20%
2024	54,610	+0.53%
Source: Philippine Statistics Authority

== Economy ==
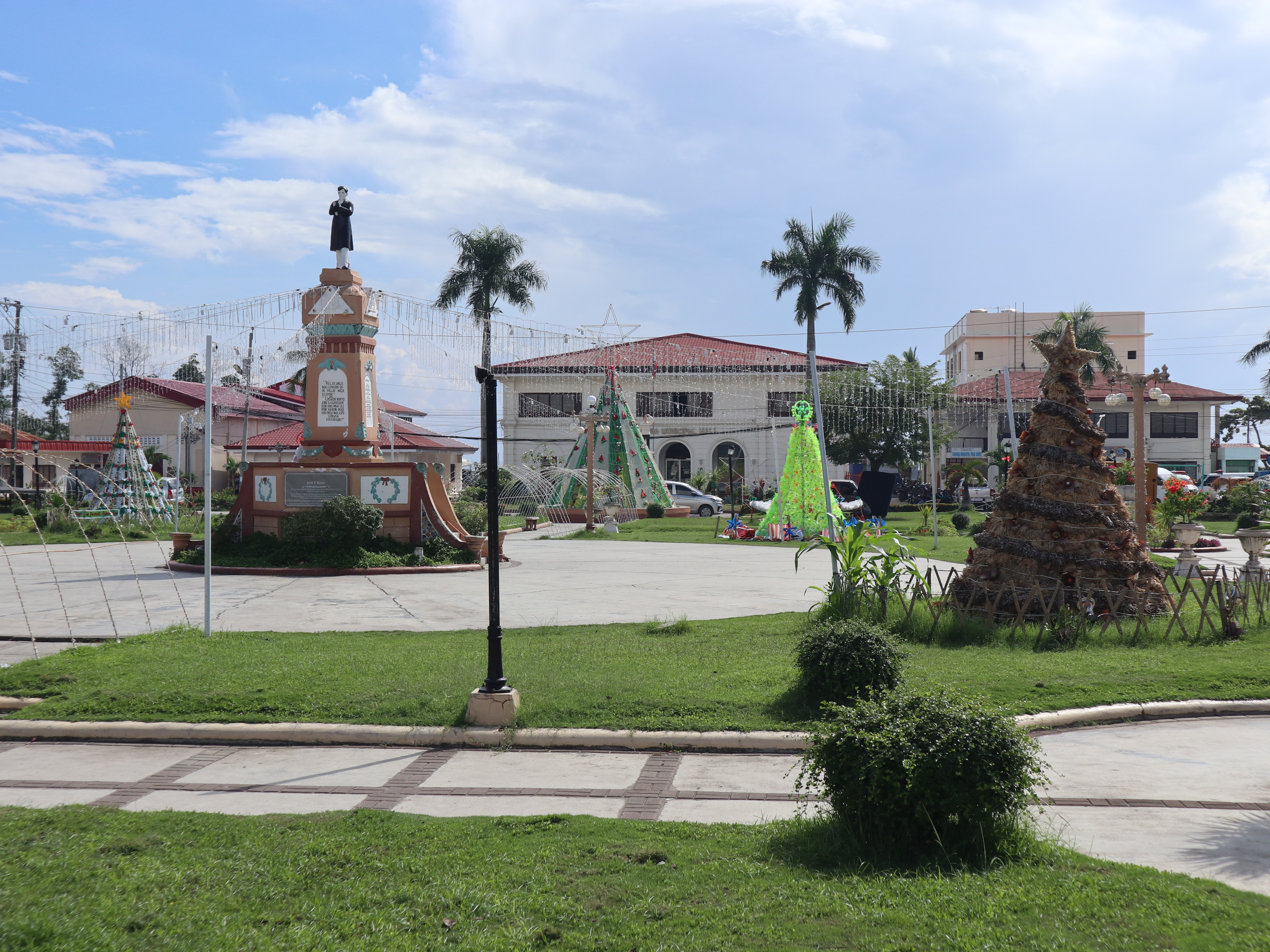
Sibonga Plaza

Poverty incidence of Sibonga (%)

Source: Philippine Statistics Authority

Sibonga has begun developing the town to become more industrial while still preserving its natural bounty. Sibonga is abundant in root crops, corn, rice, coconuts among others. The public market is held every Saturday in Poblacion. Each barangay has its own agora or marketplace with its own specific days of function. For example, in Barangay Papan, people from neighboring barangays convene in every Thursday for trade.

== Culture ==
=== Pastores de Sibonga ===
Pastores de Sibonga is a short Christmas play that narrates the nativity as performed in Magcagong. The play depicts the shepherds' adoration of the child Jesus. Pastores de Sibonga dates back to the 1920s.

Pastores de Sibonga is performed by at least four dancers. The female dancer wears a red blouse or shirt paired with a long white skirt. The male dancer wears a red shirt paired with black pants. Accessories include a round hat decorated with cut-outs of the sun, moon and stars in yellow, red, green, and other brightly colored papers together with a yellow sash placed across the body. It is performed using red fans and white handkerchiefs. An oval-shaped native fan is used and held by the right hand during the performance. The white square handkerchief is held by the left hand folded into a triangular shape.

The accompaniment music is a rondalla: an ensemble of stringed instruments (guitar, bandurria, and banjo), played with the plectrum. The lyrics tell of the pre-nativity, nativity, and post-nativity settings. It expresses happiness, joy, and worship, and offers praises and gifts for Jesus, Mary and Joseph.

== Education ==
Sibonga is also home to Sibonga Community College.

The public schools in the town of Sibonga are administered by one school district under the Schools Division of Cebu Province.

Elementary schools:

- Abugon Elementary School — Abugon
- Bae Elementary School — Bae
- Bahay-Bagacay Elementary School — Bahay
- Banlot Elementary School — Banlot
- Basak Elementary School — Basak
- Cagay Elementary School — Cagay
- Can-aga Elementary School — Can-aga
- Candaguit Elementary School — Candaguit
- Cantolaroy Elementary School — Cantolaroy
- Cansantic Elementary School — Sitio Cansantic, Bato
- Guimbangcoan Elementary School — Guimbangco-an
- Lamacan Elementary School — Lamacan
- Libo Elementary School — Libo
- Lindogon Elementary School — Lindogon
- Magcagong Elementary School — Magcagong
- Manatad Elementary School — Manatad
- Mangyan Elementary School — Mangyan
- Papan Elementary School — Papan
- Sabang Elementary School — Sabang
- Sayao Elementary School — Sayao
- Sibonga Central Elementary School — R. Bacaltos Street, Poblacion
- Simala Elementary School — Simala
- Tubod Elementary School — Tubod

High schools:

- Julian Enad Memorial National High School — Lamacan
- Manatad National High School — Manatad
- Mangyan National High School — Mangyan
- Sibonga National High School — N. Bacalso Avenue, Poblacion
- Teodoro dela Vega Memorial National High School — Papan

== Notable personalities ==
- Amapola Cabase – singer, musician, actress
- Elena Jurado - Hollywood movie actress
- Gloria Sevilla – actress

== Sources ==
- Janson, Mila C. (1991). Sayaw sa mga Pastores in the Province of Cebu (MEd thesis). Cebu: Cebu State College.
- Ocampo, Astrid G. (2004). "The 'Pastores de Sibonga' in Southern Cebu". Graduate Journal. XX (2). Cebu: University of San Carlos.
- The Freeman, Quir L. de Gracia (December 20, 1988). "The Christmas Pastores of Old are Vanishing". Cebu: Freeman Publishing.
