= Simala Shrine =

Roman Catholic church in Cebu, Philippines

- The shrine in 2023

Religion
- Affiliation: Roman Catholic
- Province: Cebu
- Patron: Mary, Mother of Jesus (as Our Lady of Lindogon)
- Status: Catholic pilgrimage site

Location
- Location: Sibonga, Cebu
- Country: Philippines
- Interactive map of Simala Shrine
- Coordinates: 9°58′45.1″N 123°35′59.7″E

Architecture
- Founder: Marian Monks of Eucharistic Adoration (MMEA)
- Established: 1998

The Monastery of the Holy Eucharist, also known as the Our Lady of Lindogon Shrine and commonly known as the Simala Shrine or the Simala Parish Church, is a Roman Catholic pilgrimage church dedicated to the Virgin Mary in Sibonga, Cebu, Philippines.

== History ==
Simala Shrine was built in 1998 by the Marian Monks of Eucharistic Adoration from Pampanga.

== Cultural significance ==
Shrine interior in 2023

The Simala Shrine is a Roman Catholic pilgrimage site. The site hosts the image of Our Lady of Lindogon, which is believed to be miraculous by devotees of the Virgin Mary; subsequent to its reported shedding of tears, it was credited with the healing of those who were afflicted with dengue in the area in 1998. The image has since that time reportedly shed tears on four more occasions, the latest being on September 8, 2016.

The image, originally a statue of Our Lady of Fatima, was donated to the Marian Monks by Terry Brooks from Pampanga. The construction of the Simala Shrine is also believed to be the realization of a prediction by Ingko Niyong Villamor that the hills of Lindogon, the current site of the shrine, would become "holy" once a "miraculous white lady reign in the place".

In the main altar of the Simala Shrine is the image of the Blessed Virgin of Simala, protected by a canopy. The ceiling is decorated with murals depicting scenes from the life of Jesus, arranged in a manner reminiscent of the Sistine Chapel in Rome.

The shrine also features an area known as the "Altar of Wishes," where visitors can light candles and leave notes or messages addressed to the Virgin Mary.
