= Horní Police =

- Municipality
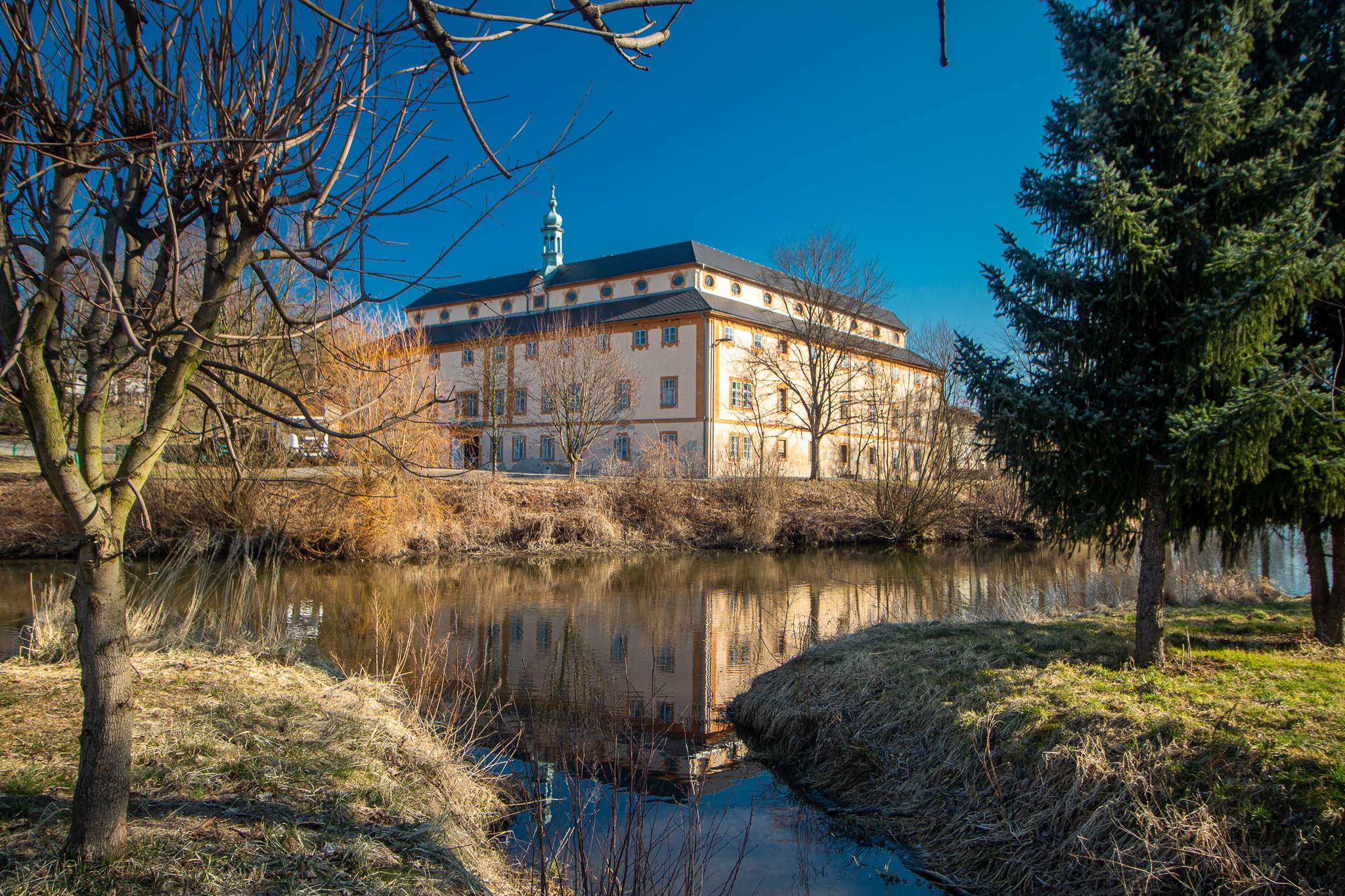
- Horní Police Castle

- Flag Coat of arms

- Location in the Czech Republic
- Coordinates: 50°42′15″N 14°24′15″E
- Country: Czech Republic
- Region: Liberec
- District: Česká Lípa
- First mentioned: 1273

Area
  - Total: 6.03 km^{2} (2.33 sq mi)
- Elevation: 252 m (827 ft)

Population (2026-01-01)
  - Total: 724
  - Density: 120/km^{2} (311/sq mi)
- Time zone: UTC+1 (CET)
  - Summer (DST): UTC+2 (CEST)
- Postal code: 471 06
- Website: www.hornipolice.cz

Horní Police (German: Oberpolitz) is a municipality and village in Česká Lípa District in the Liberec Region of the Czech Republic. It has about 700 inhabitants.

== Administrative division ==
Horní Police consists of five municipal parts (in brackets population according to the 2021 census):

- Horní Police (624)
- Dvorsko (6)
- Na Výšině (0)
- Pod Školou (19)
- Podlesí (63)

== Etymology ==
The word police means 'shelf' or 'board' in Czech. The name refers to the settlement's location in a flat place compared to the surrounding landscape. The prefix horní ('upper') serves to distinguish it from Dolní Police ('lower Police'; today part of Žandov).

== Geography ==
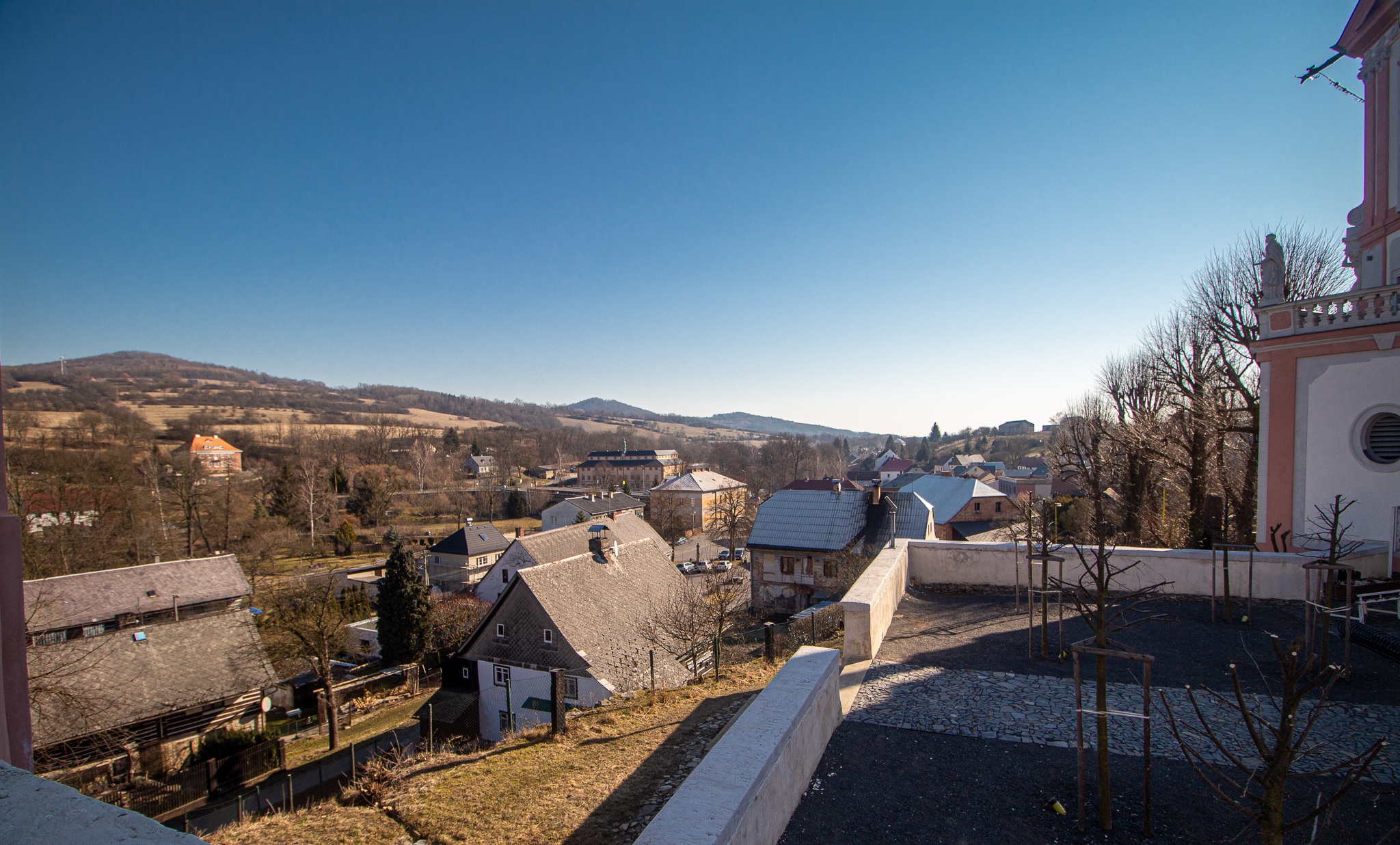
General view

Horní Police is located about 9 kilometres (6 mi) west of Česká Lípa and 25 km (16 mi) east of Ústí nad Labem. It lies in the Central Bohemian Uplands. The highest point is on the slopes of the hill Dvorský kopec at 507 m (1,663 ft) above sea level. The village of Horní Police is situated in a valley along the Ploučnice River.

== History ==
The first written mention of Horní Police is in a deed of Pope Gregory X from 15 May 1273, confirming its ownership by the Doksany monastery. During the Hussite Wars, Horní Police was acquired by the Berka of Dubá family. They owned the estate until 1612, when they had to sell it due to debts. It was bought by the Novohradský branch of the Kolowrat family. After 1628, Horní Police was inherited by Anna Magdalena of Lobkowicz and subsequently acquired by Julius Henry of Saxe-Lauenburg, who married her in 1632.

== Demographics ==
Historical population

Year	Pop.	±%
1869	1,232	—
1880	1,265	+2.7%
1890	1,147	−9.3%
1900	1,058	−7.8%
1910	1,087	+2.7%

Year	Pop.	±%
1921	1,117	+2.8%
1930	1,260	+12.8%
1950	893	−29.1%
1961	861	−3.6%
1970	804	−6.6%

Year	Pop.	±%
1980	692	−13.9%
1991	606	−12.4%
2001	645	+6.4%
2011	668	+3.6%
2021	712	+6.6%

Source: Censuses

== Transport ==
Horní Police is located on the railway line Liberec–Děčín.

== Sights ==
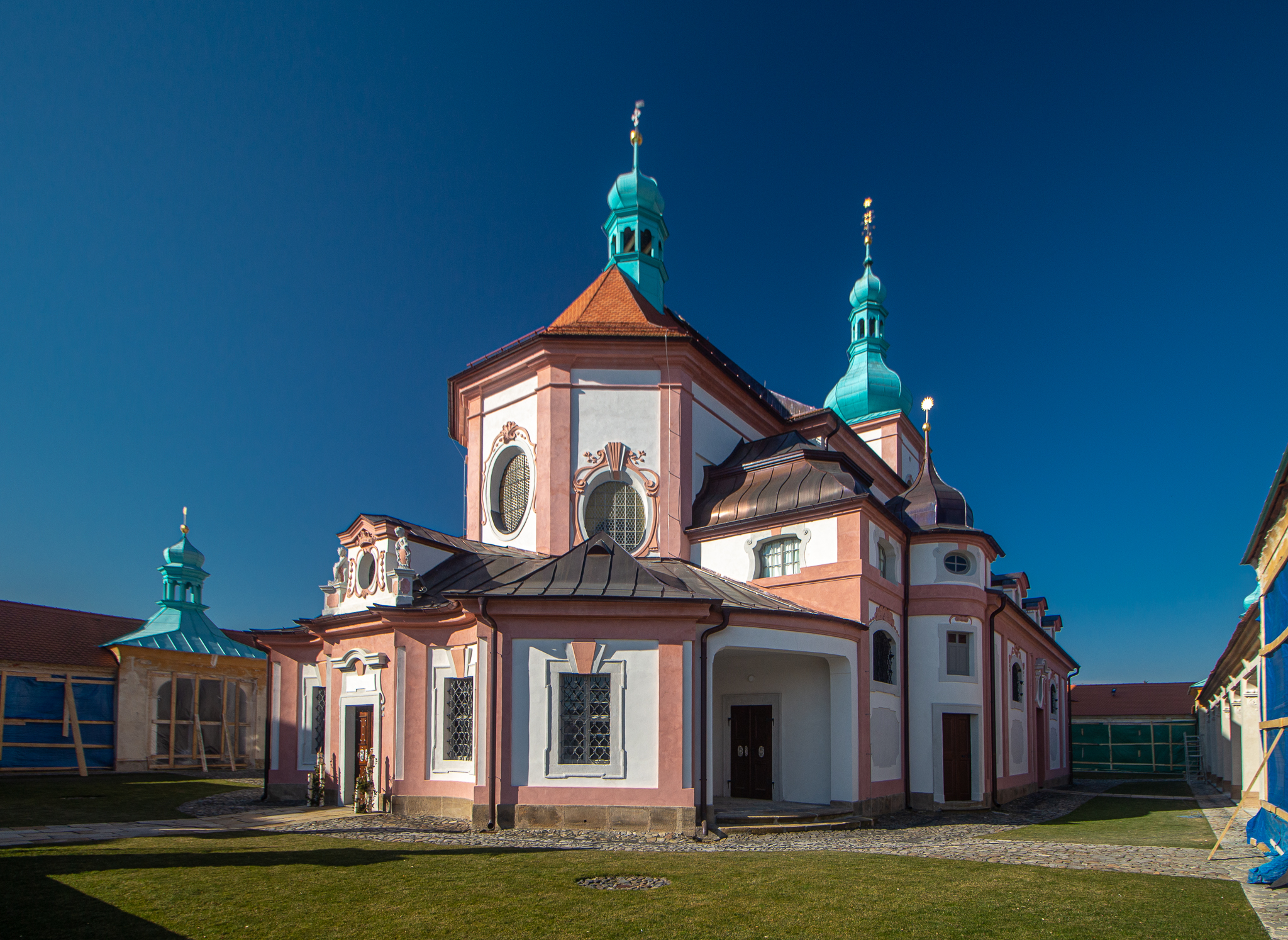
Church of the Visitation of the Virgin Mary

The first written mention of a church in Horní Police is from 1291, but it was destroyed during the Hussite Wars. A new small church became a well-known pilgrimage destination and had to be expanded. The current Church of the Visitation of the Virgin Mary was built in the Baroque style by Giulio Broggio on the site of the older church in 1688–1701.

Horní Police Castle was built after 1680 on the site of a former fortress by its owner, Duke Julius Francis of Saxe-Lauenburg.

The stone arch bridge which connects the church and the castle is one of the three most valuable buildings in Horní Police. It was built in 1840 and it is the third oldest bridge over the river Ploučnice, and the oldest original one.

== Notable people ==
- Julius Vincenz von Krombholz (1782–1843), medical doctor and mycologist
