= Annacloy River =

River in County Down, Northern Ireland

Coordinates: 54.34615°N 5.77503°W

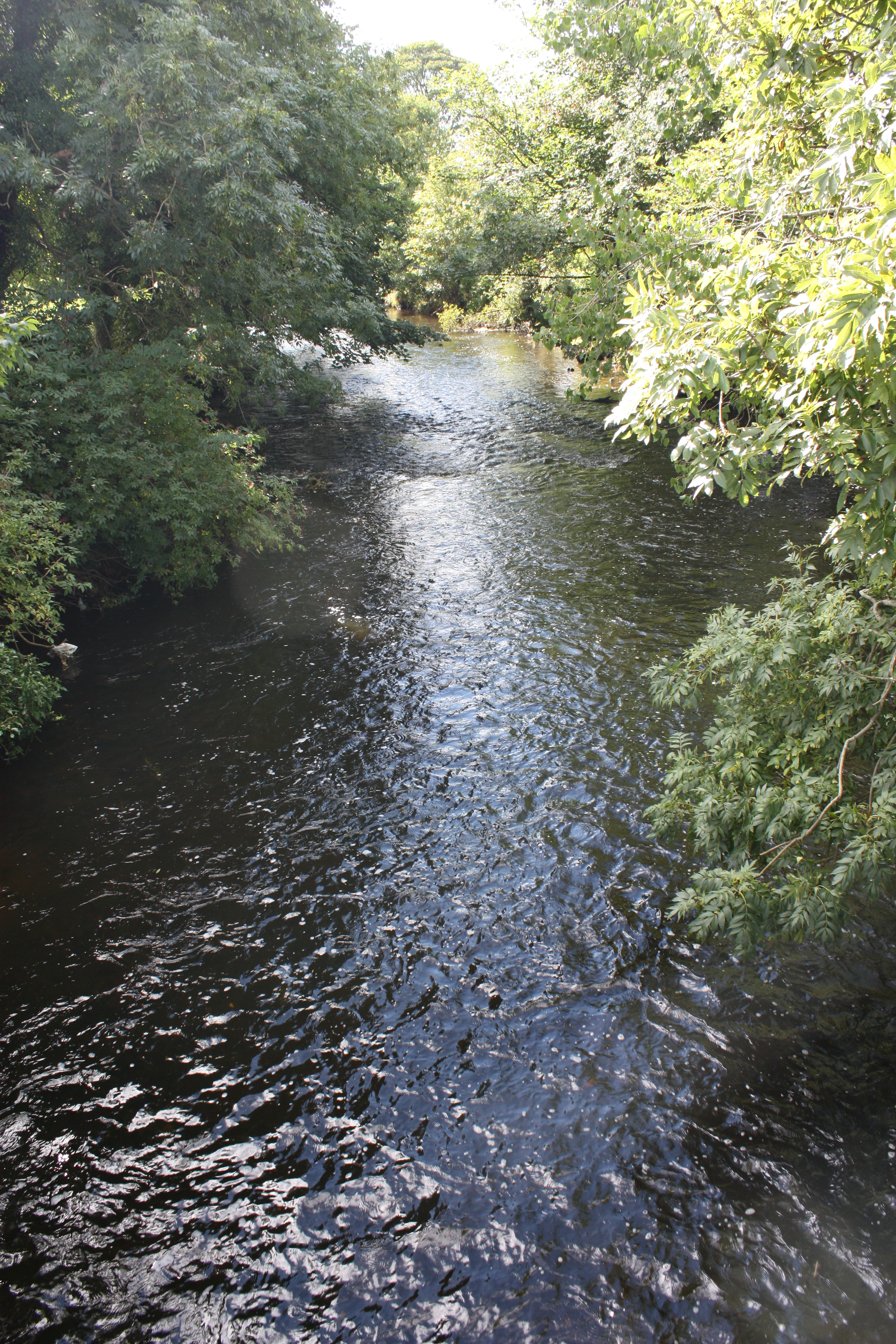
Annacloy River at Annacloy, September 2010

Annacloy River is a river in County Down, Northern Ireland, which goes through Dromara Hills and Strangford Lough.

== Course ==
The Ballynahinch River, flowing east through Ballynahinch, and the Glasswater River, flowing south through Crossgar, join at Kilmore, and the united stream is called the Annacloy River, and lower down the River Quoile, falling into the southwest angle of Strangford Lough near Downpatrick.

Between Annacloy to Stranford Lough, the Annacloy is renamed to the River Quoile.

== See also ==
- Rivers of Ireland
- List of rivers of Ireland
