= Dunum =

Dunum may refer to:

- Dunam, a unit of measurement of land area also spelled dunum
- Dunum (Ireland), historic name of at least two places
- Dunum, Lower Saxony, a municipality in Germany
