= Ballynahinch River =

River in County Down, Northern Ireland

Coordinates: 54.38815°N 5.77297°W

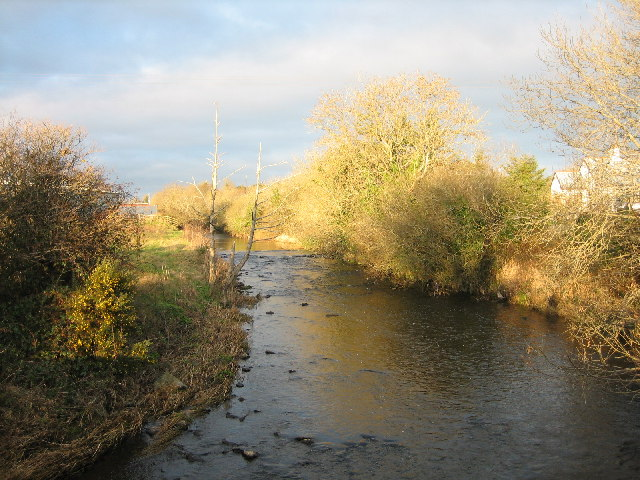
Ballynahinch river

Ballynahinch River is a river in County Down, Northern Ireland. It is one of the two component watercourses which form the Annacloy River, also known as the Quoile River.

== Course ==
The Ballynahinch River, flowing east through Ballynahinch, and the Carson's Dam River, flowing south through Crossgar, join at Kilmore, and the united stream is called the Annacloy River, and lower down the River Quoile, falling into the southwest angle of Strangford Lough near Downpatrick.

== History ==
The banks of the Ballynahinch River in the early days (18th century) were dotted with little bleach greens, but as bleaching became more centralised in the Lagan-Bann region, the small greens went out of existence. The first water-powered scutch mills were introduced about 1750, the second in Down being at Rademon.

== See also ==
- Rivers of Ireland
- List of rivers of Ireland
