= Lough Money =

Lake in Northern Ireland

Coordinates: 54.338°N 5.642°W

Lough Money is a lake (lough in the Irish language) in County Down, about three miles from the town of Downpatrick, Northern Ireland. A rainbow trout fishery is maintained there for anglers.
