= Down Arts Centre =

Municipal Building in Downpatrick, Northern Ireland

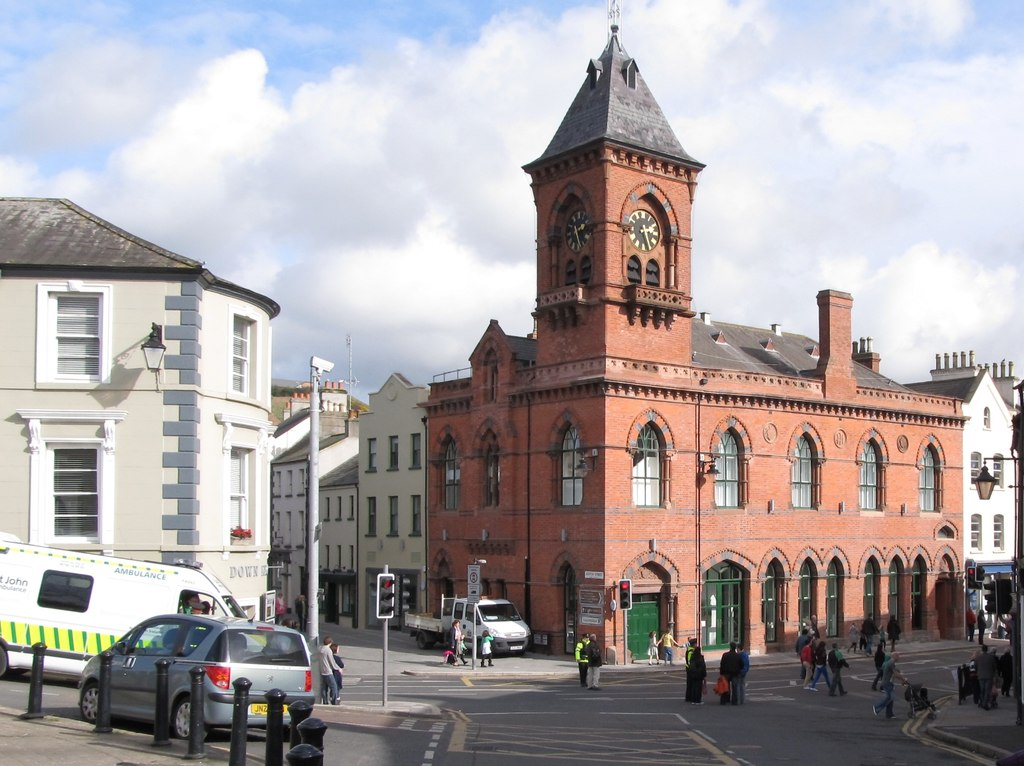
- Down Arts Centre

- Shown in Northern Ireland
- 54.3288°N 5.7156°W
- Location: Irish Street, Downpatrick

History
- Built: 1882

Site notes
- Architect: William Batt
- Architectural style: Gothic Revival style

Listed Building – Grade B1
- Official name: Down Arts Centre (former Assembly rooms)
- Designated: 20 October 1982
- Reference no.: HB 18/19/001

The Down Arts Centre, formerly Downpatrick Town Hall and also Downpatrick Assembly Rooms, is a municipal structure in Irish Street in Downpatrick, County Down, Northern Ireland. The structure, which was the meeting place of Down Urban District Council, is a Grade B1 listed building.

== History ==
The first municipal building in Downpatrick was a market house which was a gift to the town from Wingfield Cromwell, 2nd Earl of Ardglass and was completed in 1660. It was arcaded on the ground floor, so that markets could be held, with an assembly room on the first floor. After the building became dilapidated in the 1870s, the local member of parliament, John Mulholland, offered to pay for a new building on the same site.

The new building was designed by William Batt in the Gothic Revival style, built in red brick by Dixon & Co. and completed in 1882. The design involved an asymmetrical main frontage with five bays facing onto Irish Street; it featured a prominent three-stage clock tower on the corner with Scotch Street; there was an arched doorway on the ground floor of the tower, a gothic window flanked by colonettes on the first floor and a clock face on the second floor. The façade facing Irish Street featured a series of narrow gothic windows on the ground floor and four wider gothic windows flanked by colonettes on the first floor. At roof level there was a modillioned cornice and a central chimney. Internally, there were two halls, the larger hall, located on the first floor, accommodating 800 people and the smaller hall, on the ground floor, accommodating 200 people.

After significant population growth, the area became an urban district with the building as its meeting place in 1925. It was also used as an events venue and the singer, Gracie Fields, performed in the building during the Second World War.

The building continued to serve as the meeting place of Downpatrick Urban District Council for much of the 20th century, but ceased that role after the enlarged Down District Council was formed with offices in Stangford Road in 1974. It was badly damaged in a fire in 1983 but was restored in 1984: it was then converted for use as the Down Arts Centre in 1989 and the local rock band, Ash, held one of their earliest performances there in the 1990s. A programme of refurbishment works costing £1.4 million supported by the Arts Council of Northern Ireland, Tourism Northern Ireland and Down District Council started in February 2011. The works, which were undertaken to a design by Kriterion Architects, included modernisation of the facilities as well as the creation of some additional creative space and were completed in June 2012.
