= Struell Wells =

Wells in County Down

Coordinates: 54°19′25.71″N 5°40′36.17″W

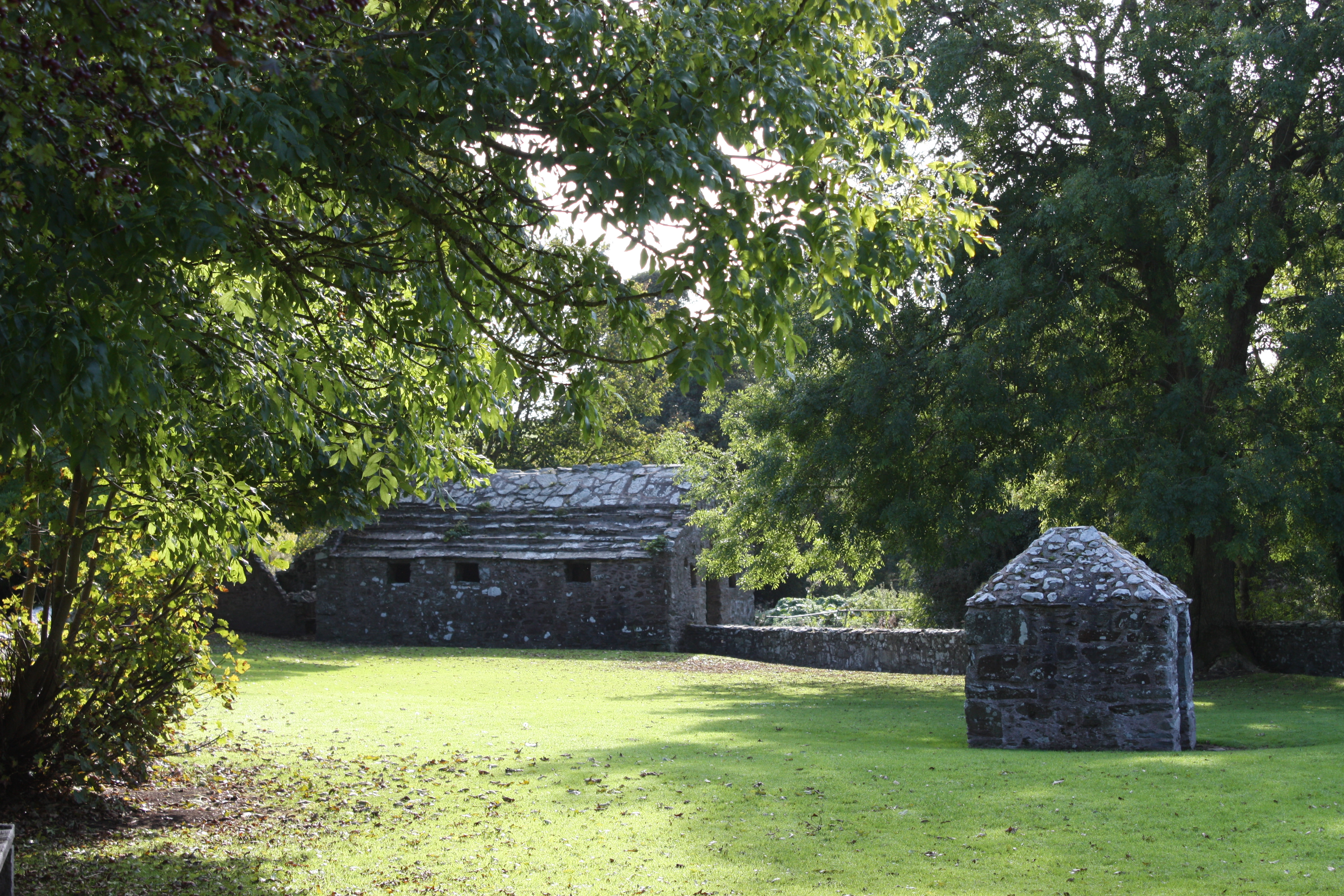
Well and Men's bath house, Struell Wells, October 2009

Struell Wells (Irish: Toibreacha an tSruthail; Ulster-Scots: Struell Waals) are a set of four holy wells in the townland of Struell, 1.5 miles (2.4 km) east of Downpatrick, County Down, Northern Ireland (grid ref: J513442). The wells date from before the time of Saint Patrick, and even today are used for people seeking cures. On Mid-Summer Eve (Saint John's Eve) and the Friday before Lammas, hundreds of pilgrims used to visit Struell. The earliest written reference to the wells is in 1306 when a chapel was recorded on the site, but none of the surviving buildings is earlier than about 1600. Pilgrimages to the site are well documented from the 16th century to the 19th century. The site is managed by the Northern Ireland Environment Agency.

== Features ==
A fast flowing stream runs in a south-easterly direction, partly underground, through the secluded, rocky valley, along which is ranged five buildings. The stream (in Irish sruthar) (or sruthail) gives the site its name.

== History ==
In 2006, Environment and Heritage Service officials were asked to explain why the wells were drying up and why two of the wells on the site no longer contained water. They said they were aware of the water flow problems and had remedial measures in place which would involve the excavation of some of the piping.

== Gallery ==
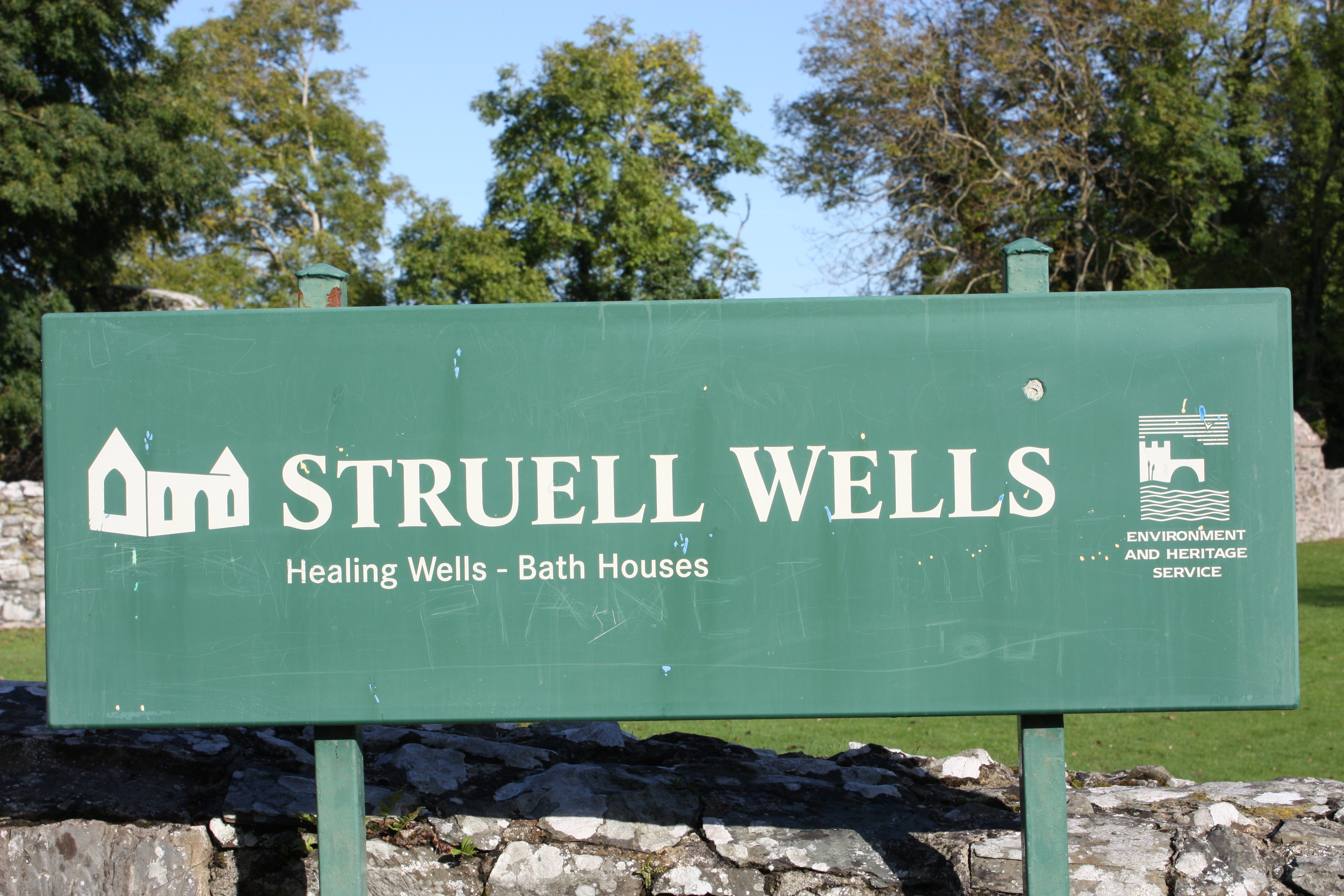
Struell Wells sign, October 2009

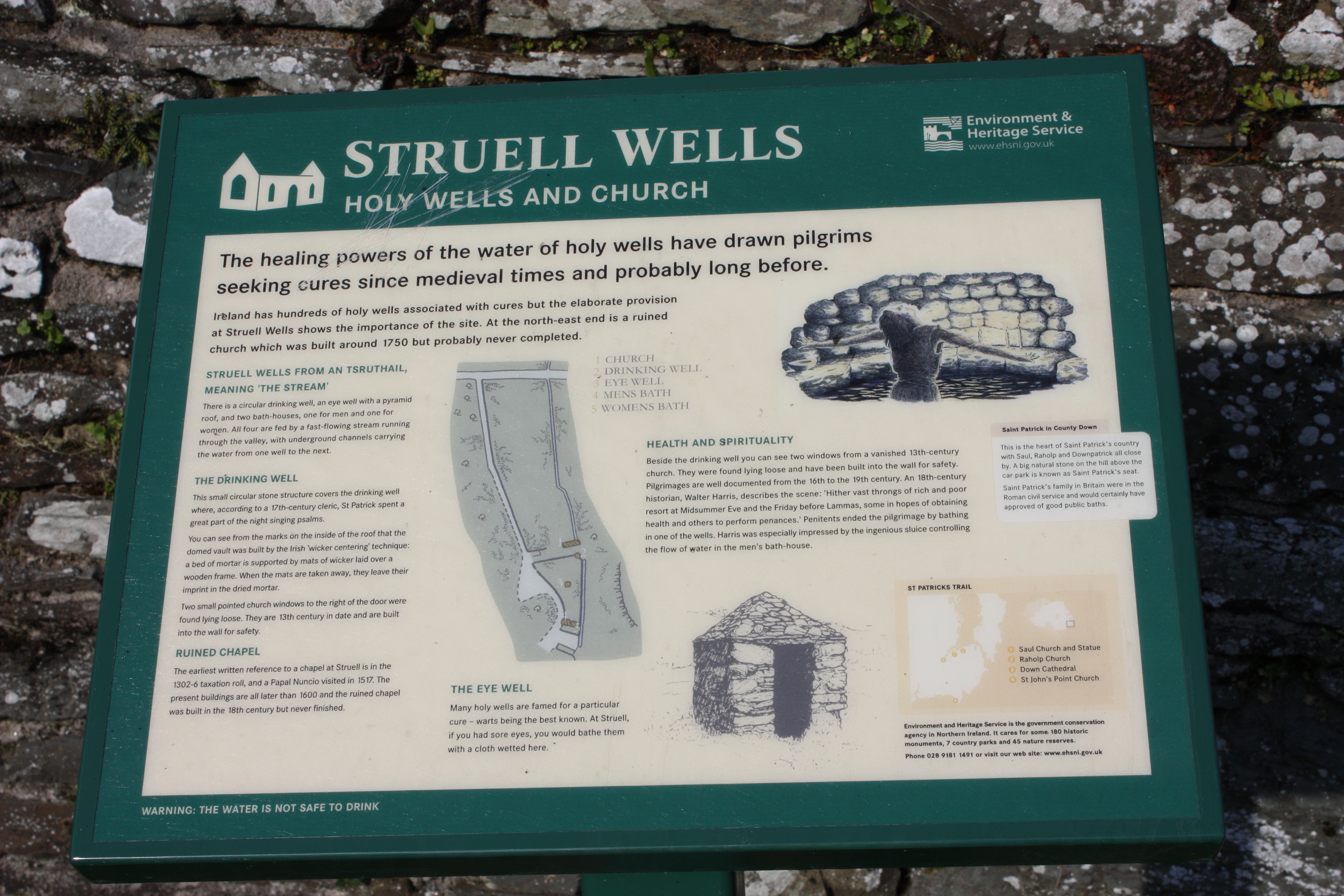
Struell Wells information board, October 2009

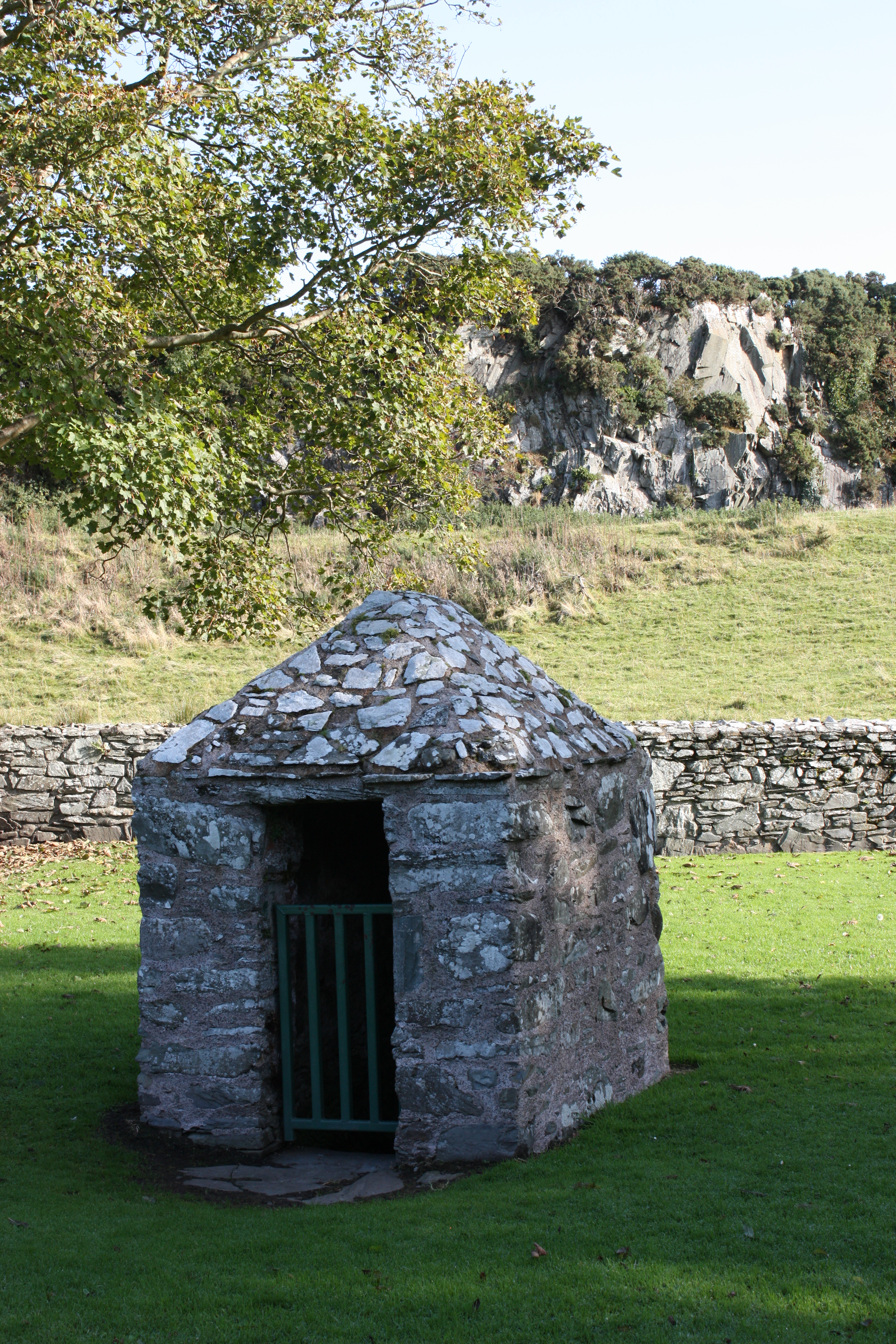
Well at Struell Wells, October 2009

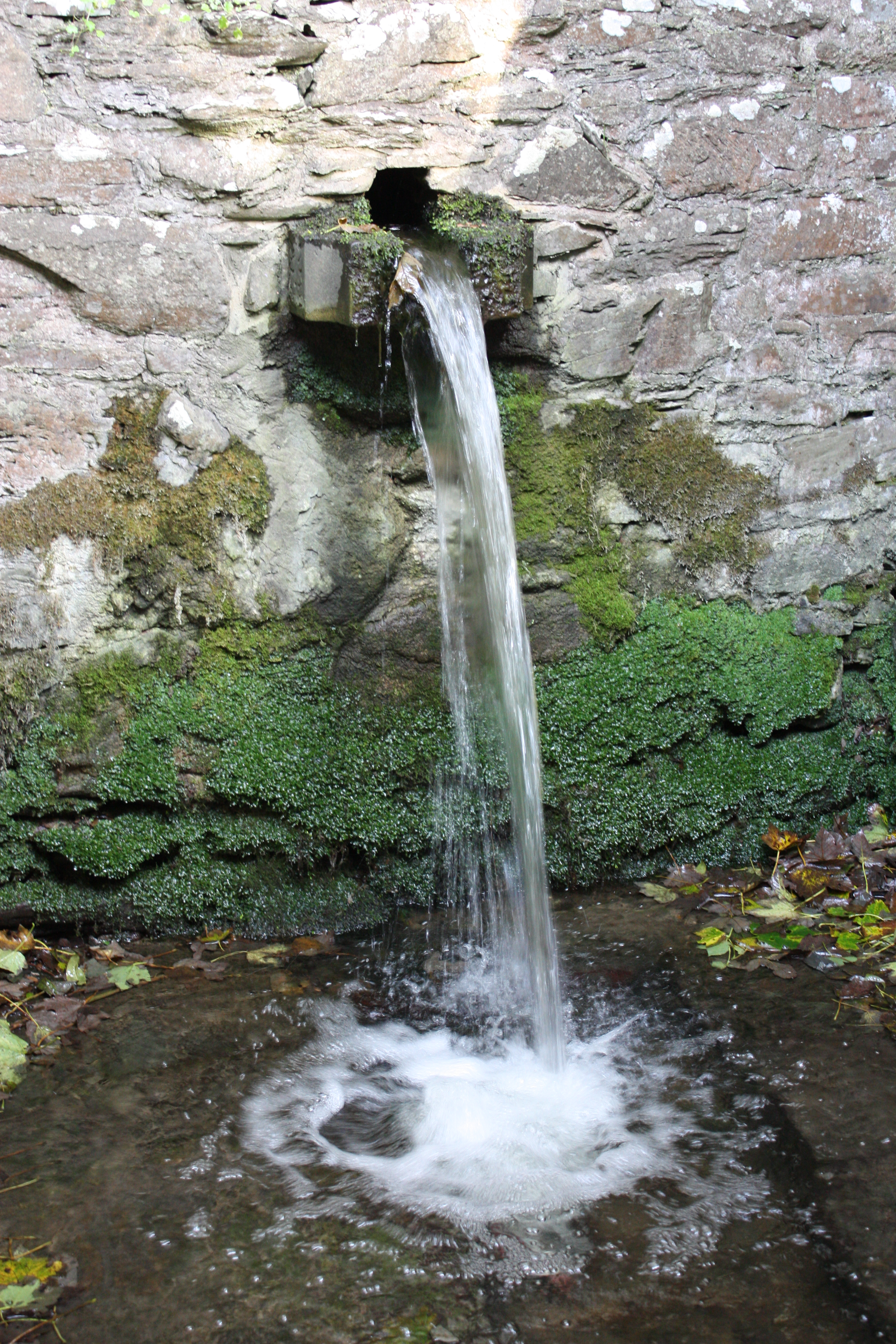
Women's bath house, Struell Wells, October 2009

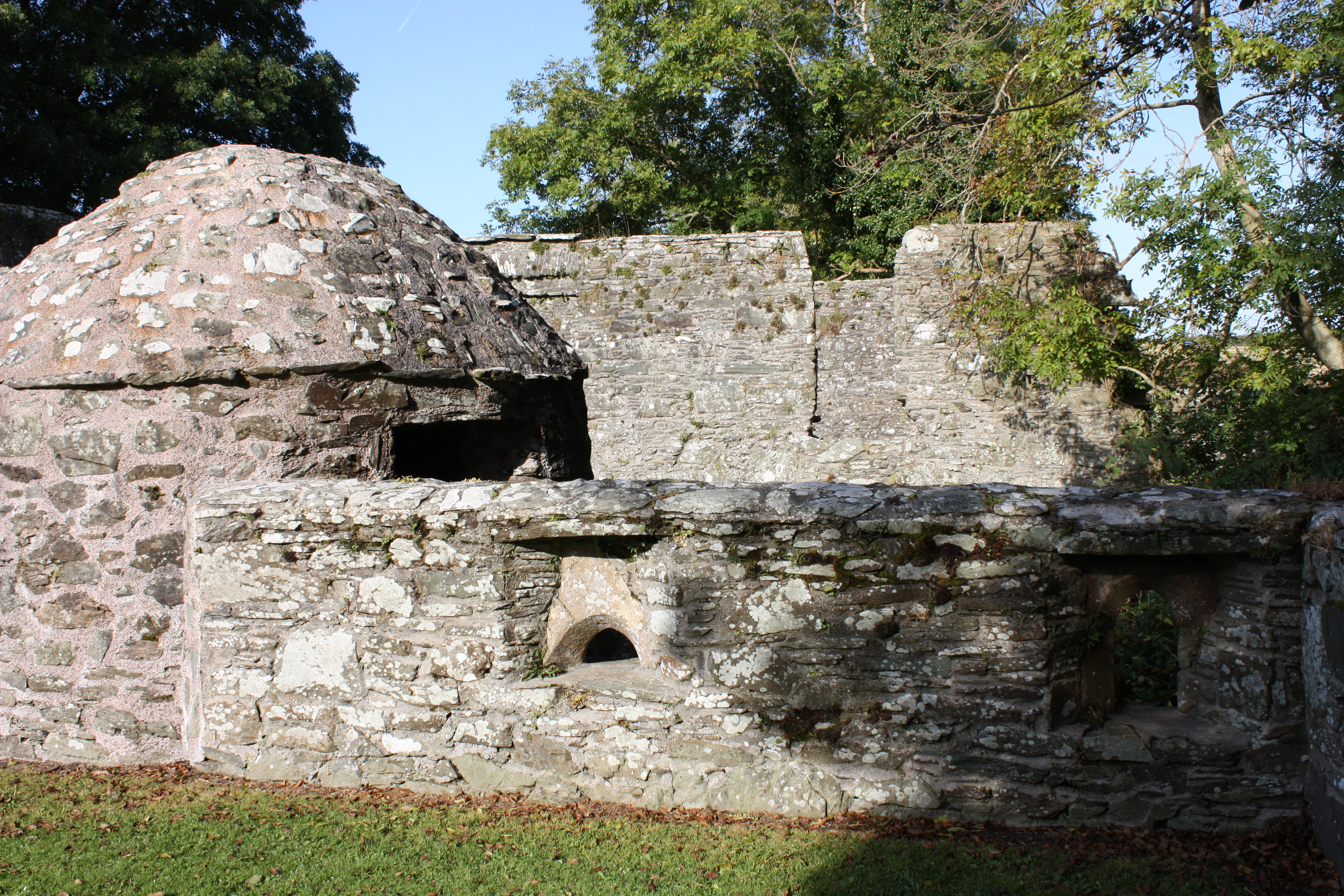
Well at Struell Wells, October 2009

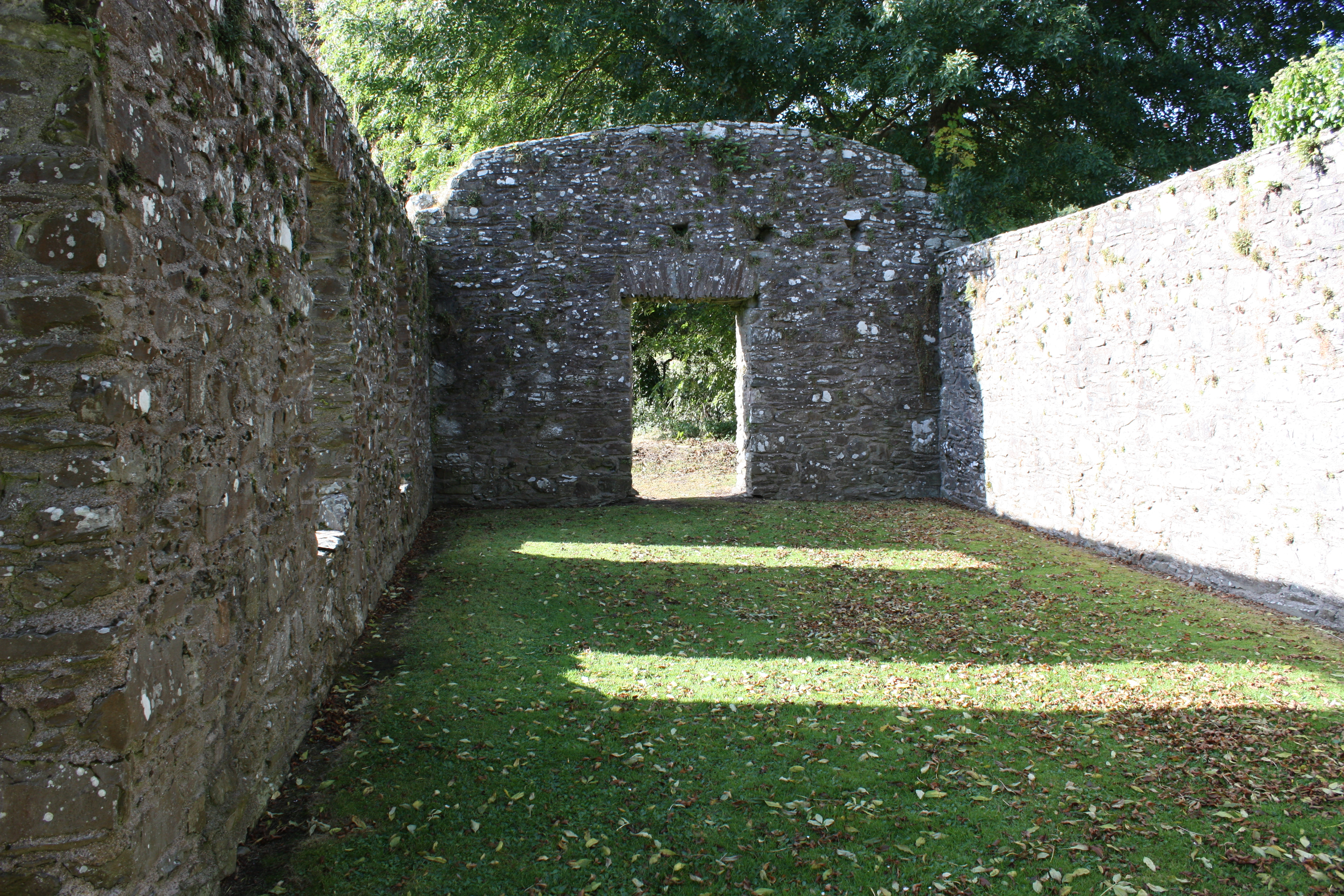
Church at Struell Wells, October 2009
