= River Quoile =

River in County Down, Northern Ireland

Coordinates: 54°22′12″N 5°40′38″W

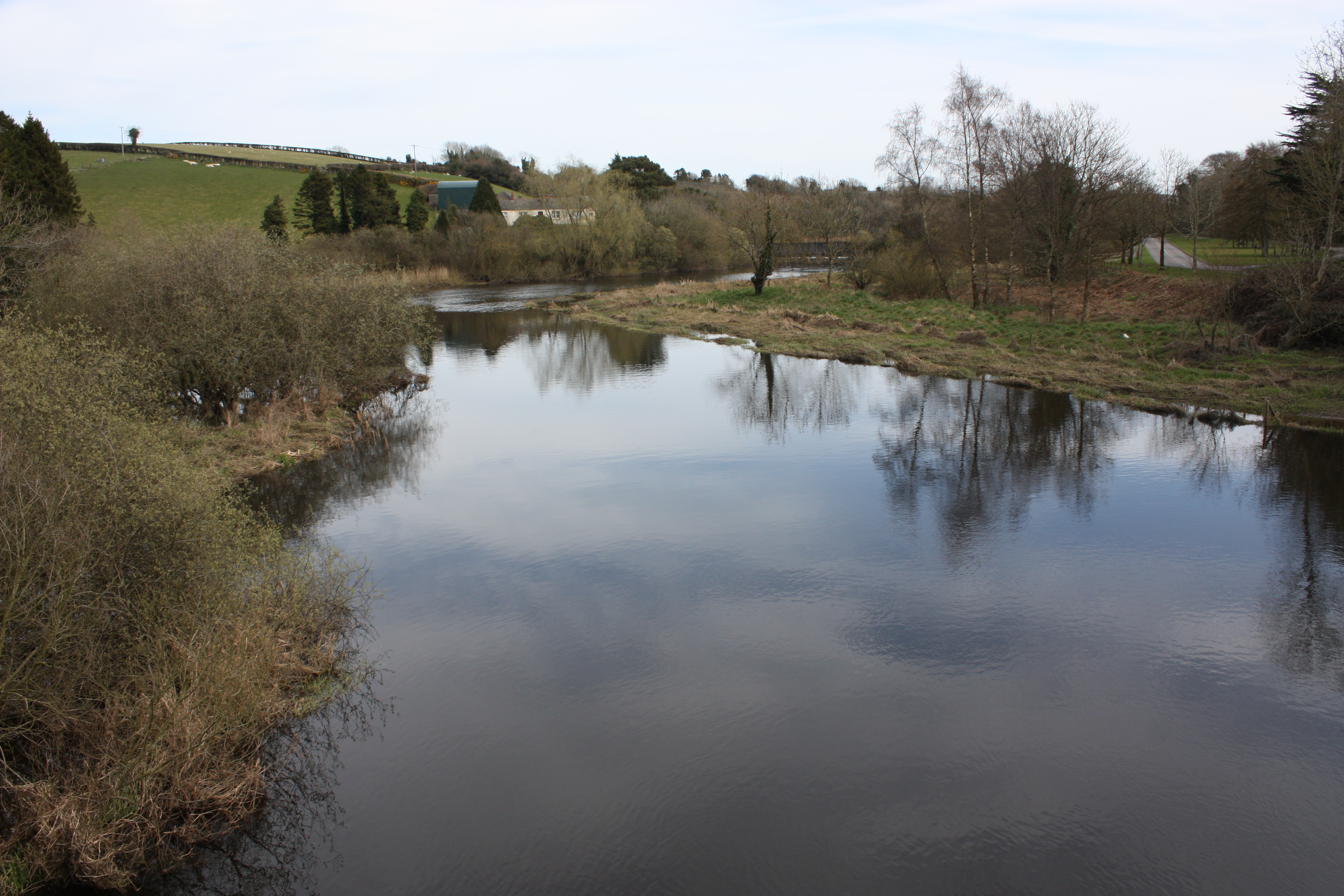
- River Quoile, from Quoile Bridge, April 2010

- Map of Strangford Lough; River Quoile is visible to its south
- Etymology: Irish caol, "narrow"
- Native name: An Caol (Irish)

Location
- Country: United Kingdom
- Constituent country: Northern Ireland
- County: Down

Physical characteristics
- Source
  - location: Ballynahinch River
- Mouth: Strangford Lough
  - location: North of Downpatrick
- Length: 27.5 mi (44.3 km)

The Quoile (/ˈkwɔɪl/; from Irish An Caol 'the narrow') is a river in County Down, Northern Ireland.

== Course ==
The river begins its life as the Ballynahinch River which flows from west of the town of Ballynahinch to Annacloy where it is known as the Annacloy River. This then becomes the Quoile proper, which flows through Downpatrick and the Quoile Pondage before finally emptying into Strangford Lough.

== History ==
The river was effectively created when Edward Southwell (1705–1755) landlord of Downpatrick built a tidal barrier at the Quoile and began draining the land, creating 500 acres of land from what was previously the western branch of Strangford Lough. The name comes from the narrowest point of the estuary at Finnebrogue, where a ford and ferry existed before the construction of the bridge. Harris, in 1744, mistakenly writes that the name of the bridge should be Coyne (after the branch of Loch Cuan up stream) not Coyle because he overlooked the origin.

=== Inch Abbey ===
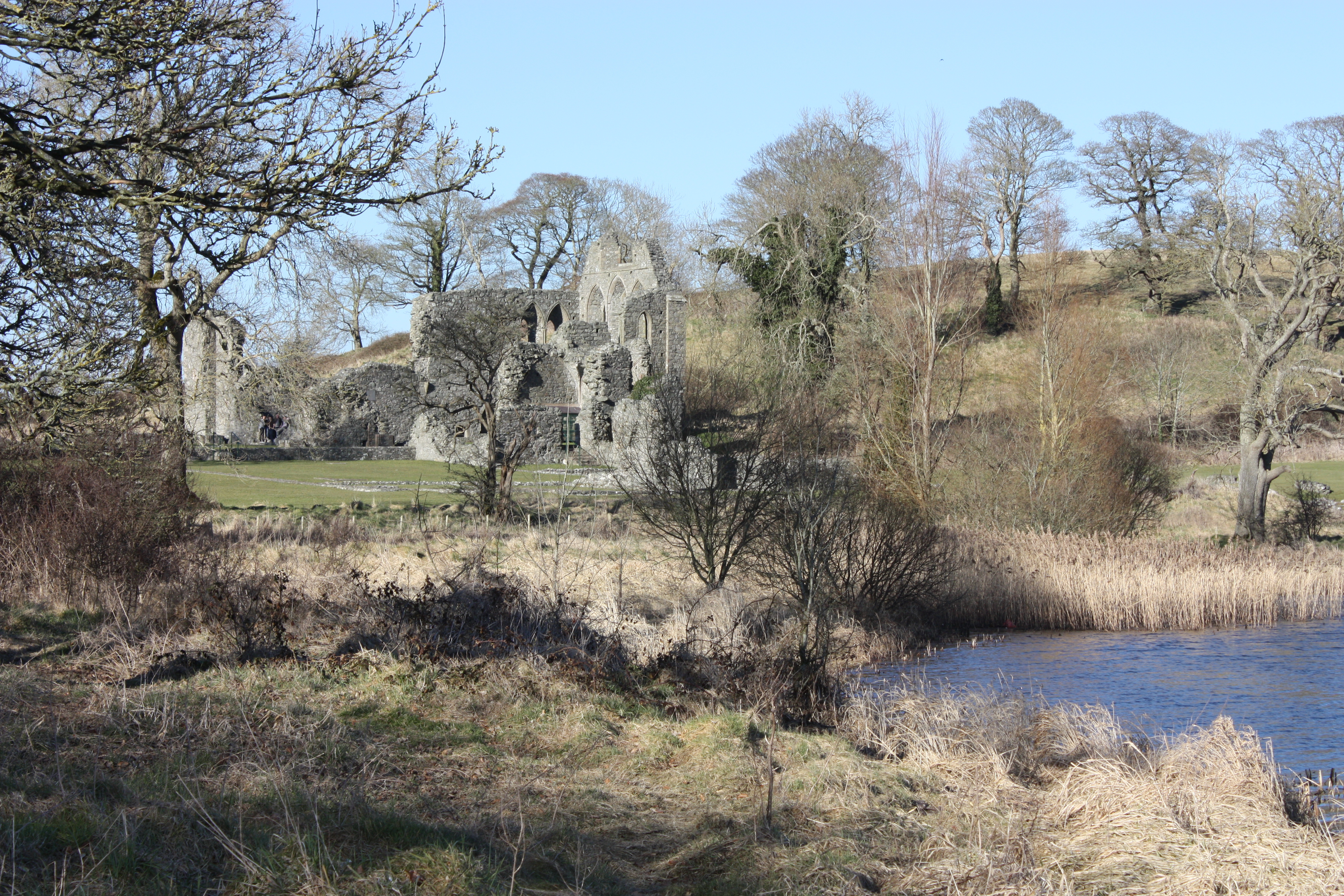
River Quoile and Inch Abbey, March 2010

On the north bank of the river, 0.75 miles (1.2 km) north-west of Downpatrick, the Inch Abbey site was originally on an island (Irish: Inis) in the Quoile Marshes. The pre-Norman Celtic monastic settlement here, known as Inis Cumhscraigh (or Inis Cuscraidh), was in existence by the year 800. In 1002 it was plundered by the Vikings led by Sitric, King of the Danes, who came up the Quoile with a fleet from the sea. The Vikings plundered the settlement again in 1149.

=== Quoile Castle ===
Quoile Castle is situated 1.5 miles (2.4 km) from Downpatrick, just off the main road from Downpatrick to Strangford, on the east bank of the river. It is a 16th-century Tower house which was inhabited into the 18th century.

=== Steam-Boat Quay ===
In September 1837, the County Down and Liverpool Steam-Boat Company commenced regular sailings of their steam packet Victoria between a quay on the Quoile and Liverpool. However, the tides of Strangford Lough made time-keeping difficult and there was insufficient low-volume, high-value trade suitable for a steam-boat route. The company folded in 1839 and their ship was sold off.

The iron steamship Robert Burns, 120 gross tons, built in 1857 on the Clyde, provided a regular cargo service from the Quoile to northern English ports for 17 years from 1866. The main export was agricultural produce and coal the main import.

== Quoile Pondage Nature Reserve ==
Following the building of the tidal barrier in 1957, the Quoile Pondage evolved into a freshwater marsh. A footpath runs along the bank from the old floodgates to the remains of the stream-boat quay.

== See also ==
- List of rivers of Ireland
