= Quoile Castle =

Coordinates: 54°20′58.3″N 5°41′59.48″W

- Near Downpatrick, County Down, Northern Ireland
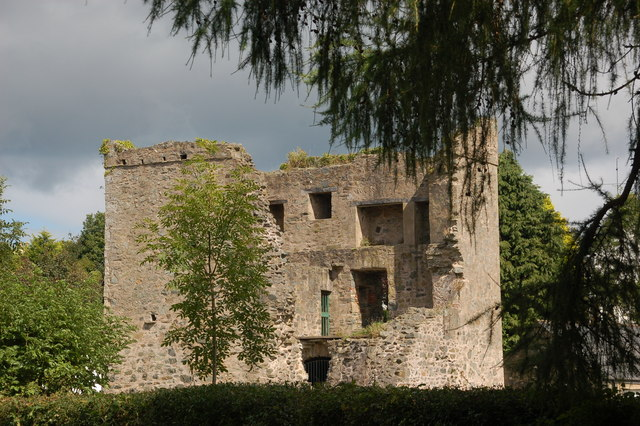

Site information
- Type: Tower house

Site history
- Built: Late 16th century
- Materials: Split-stone rubble with sandstone dressing

Quoile Castle is a castle situated 1.5 miles (2.4 km) from Downpatrick, County Down, Northern Ireland, just off the main road from Downpatrick to Strangford, on the east bank of the River Quoile. The castle was built during the late 16th / early 17th Century and was continuously used up to the 1700s. It has been suggested that it was built by Captain Richard West. Quoile Castle is a State Care Historic Monument in the townland of Quoile, in Down District Council area, at grid ref: J4963 4701.

The castle is a tower house - a type of building found throughout Ireland, largely constructed from the 15th to 17th Centuries - the Stangford Lough coastline has a density of these monuments (e.g., Audley's Castle, Sketrick Castle, Mahee Castle, Portaferry Castle etc.). Whilst they had defensive features, it has been suggested that they were built to withstand an attack by a [small] rival militia, rather than being able to withstand a large siege-type attacks.

== Finds ==
In 1986, seven silver sixpence pieces dating from the time of Elizabeth I were found at the castle.

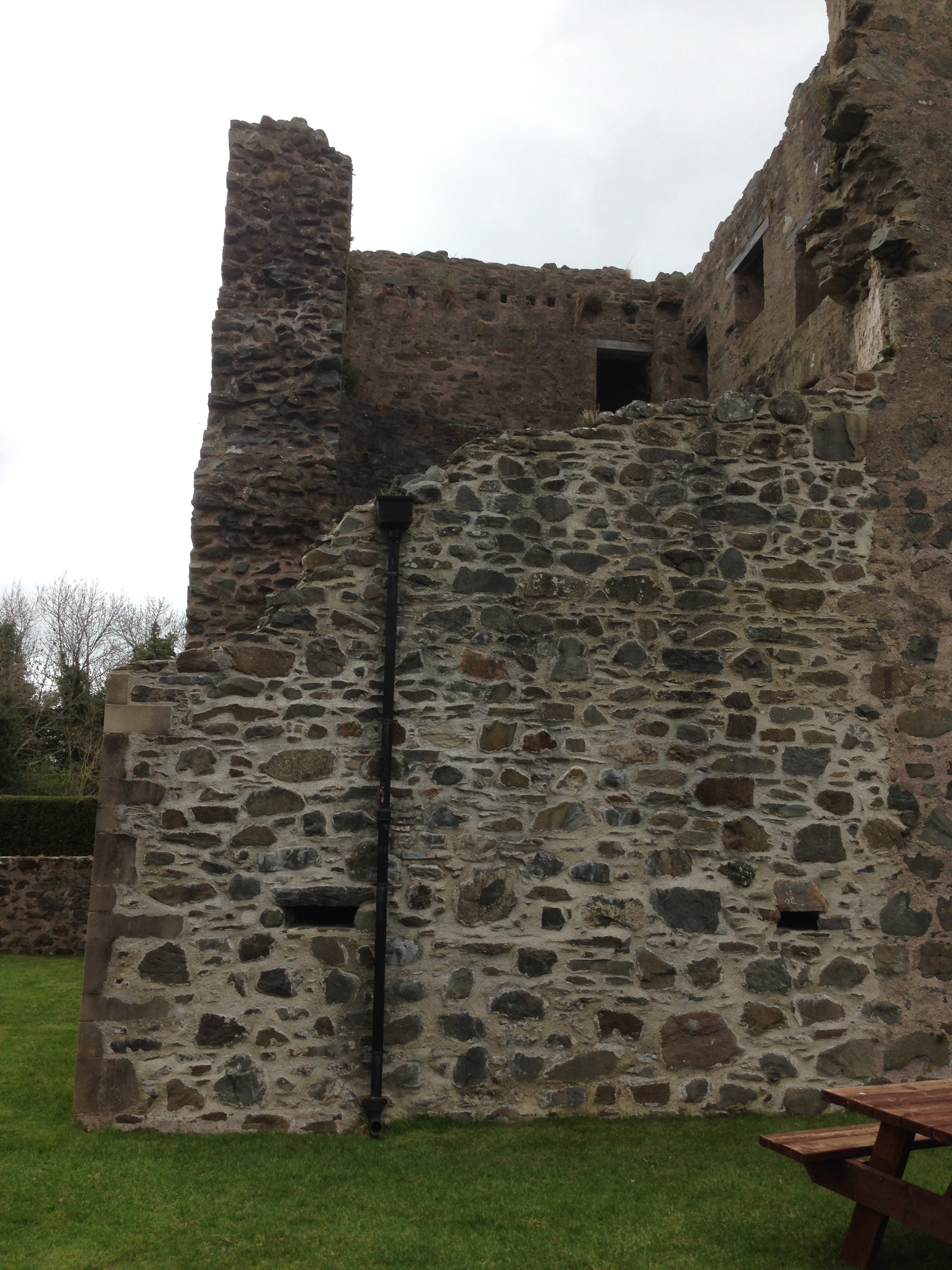
Partially reconstructed West wall of Quoile Castle, Downpatrick

== Gallery ==
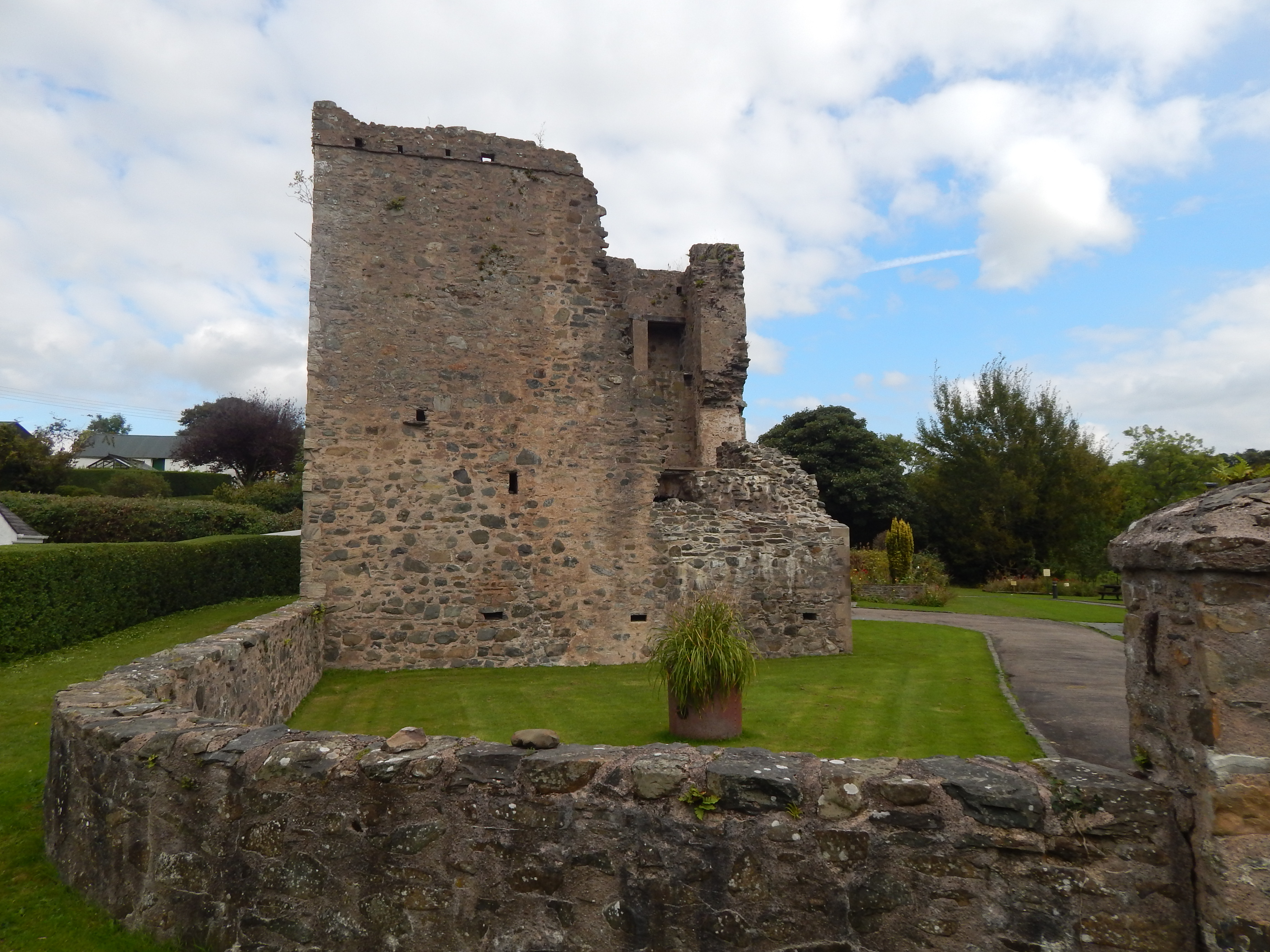

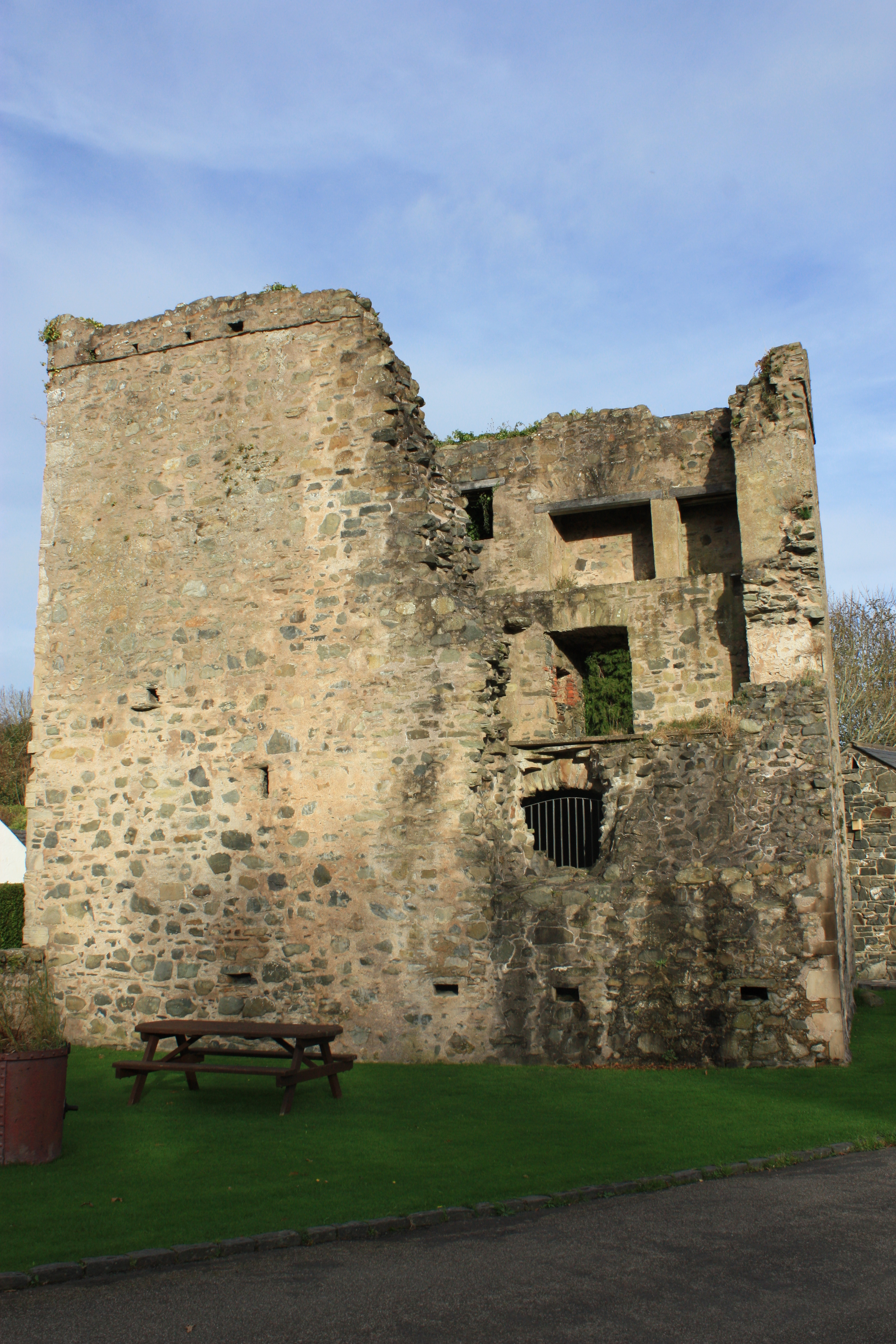
Quoile Castle, October 2009

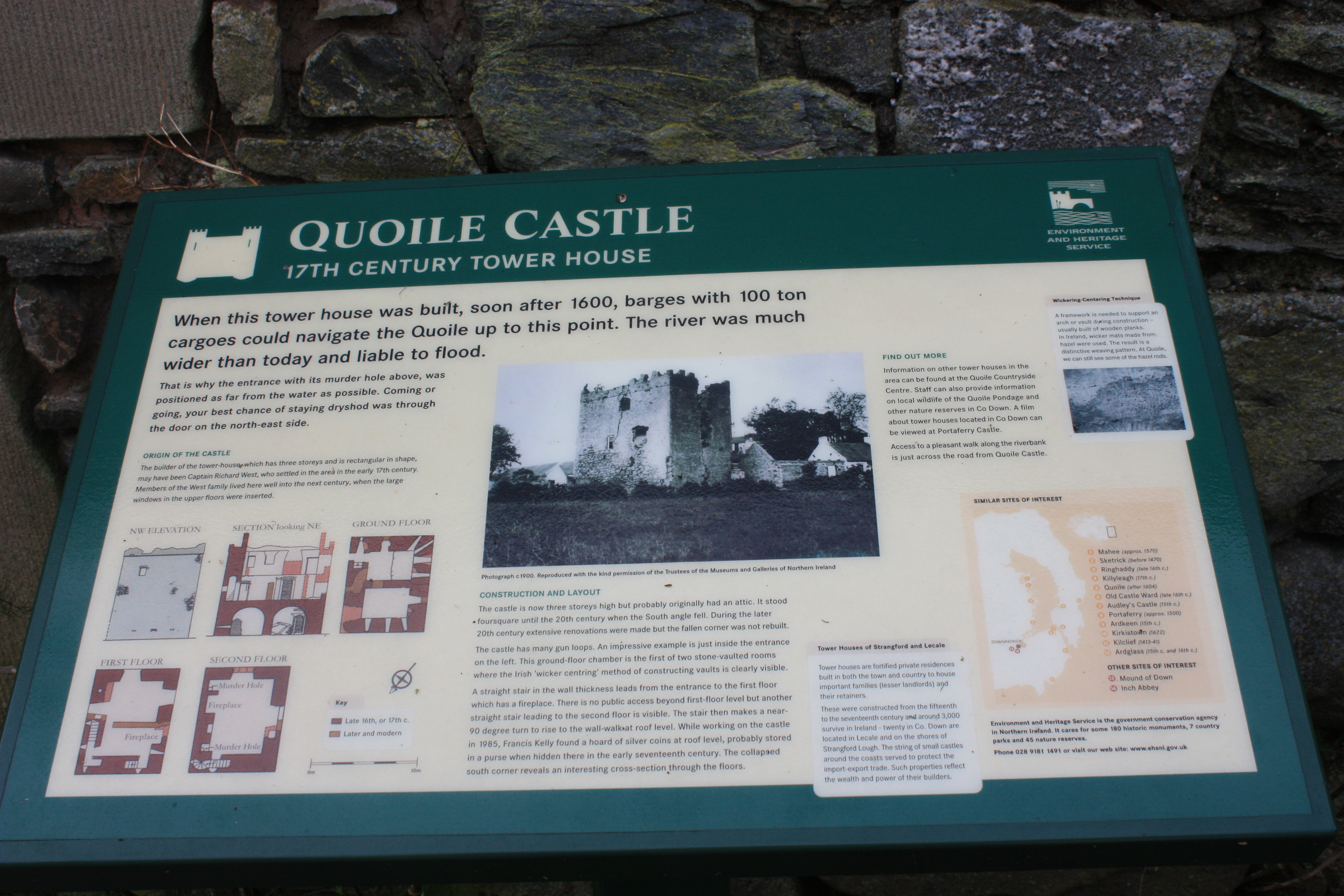
Information board, Quoile Castle, October 2009

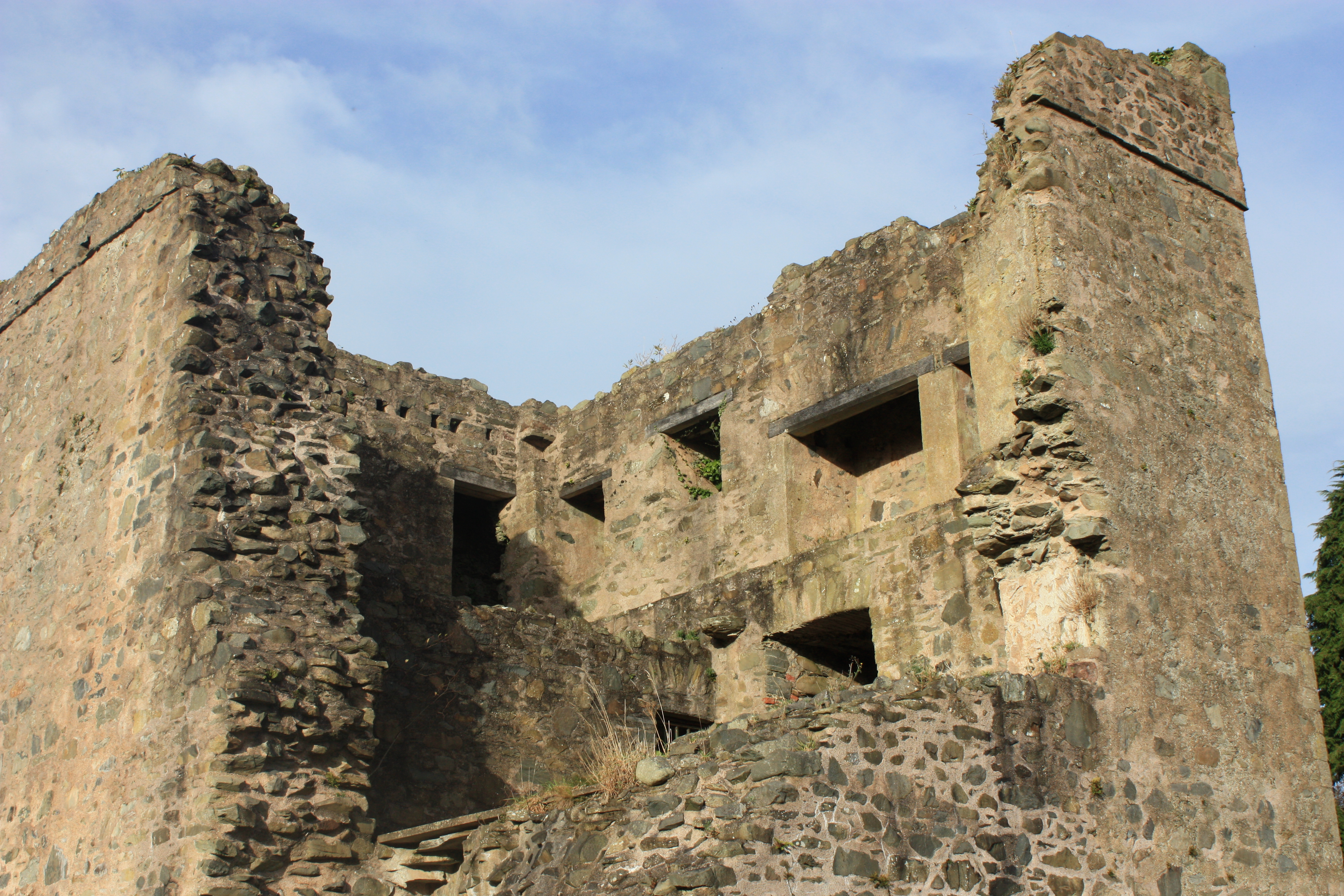
Quoile Castle, October 2009

== See also ==
- List of castles in Northern Ireland
