= Dunum (Ireland) =

Historic name of at least two places

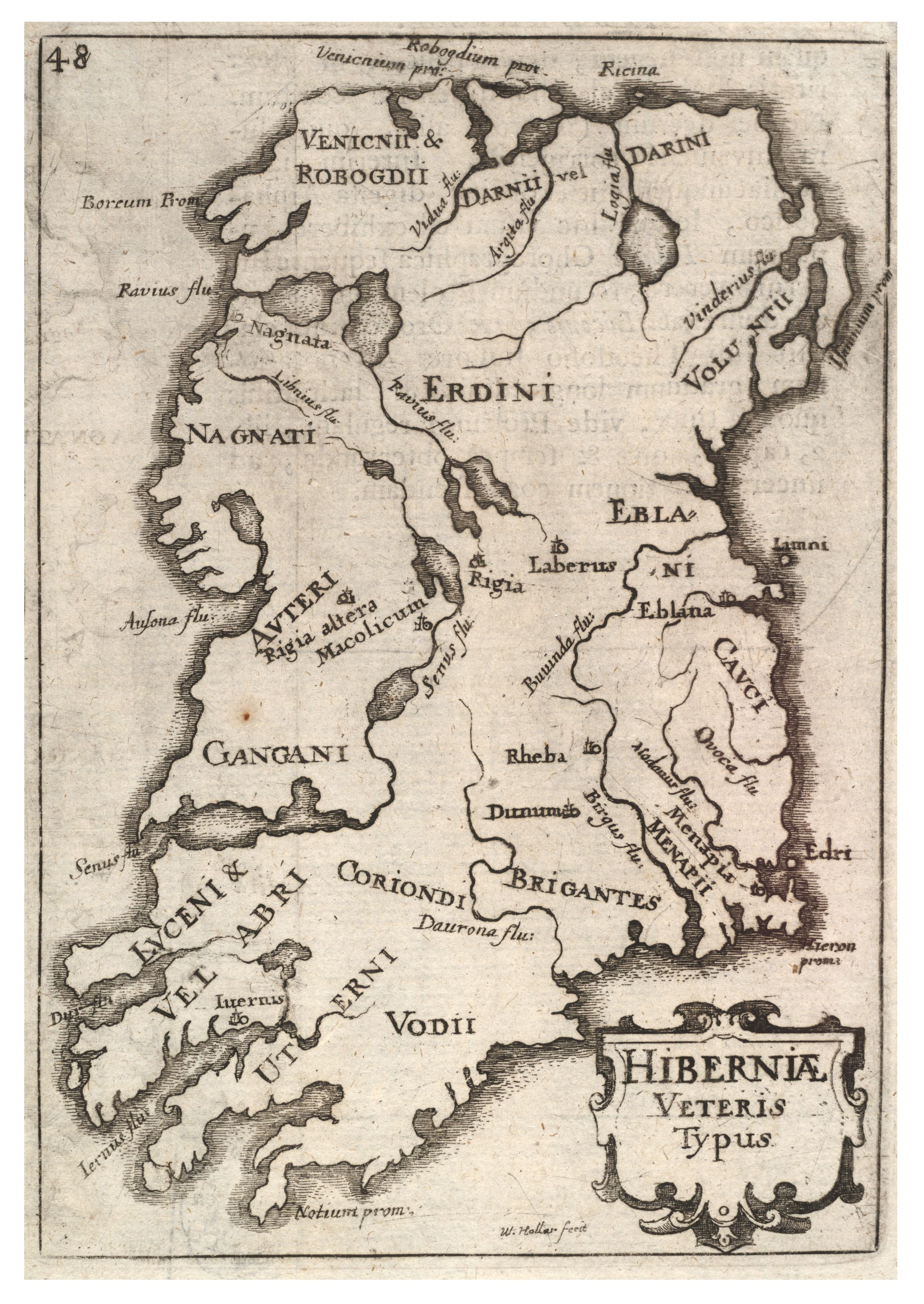
17th century map showing Dunum in the southern Menapii region, which appears in the area of County Waterford and County Wexford, but may actually have been situated in the Rathdrum, County Wicklow

Dunum was a Latinized name of a place in ancient Ireland and the name of at least two recorded settlements there, one in the far north, one in the far south. The southerly settlement is attributed in ancient print as the original site or namesake of Rathdrum in County Wicklow. The northerly is attributed to the settlement of Downpatrick in County Down, which the Irish called Dunedh, and also Rath-keltar or Rath-Keltair, .The name originated from Keltair, son of Duach – Rath- meaning castle – and was quoted as that in the Will of Saint Patrick.

== Overview ==
As a word, Dunum is very similar to words for fortifications and measurements, and sometimes used as a suffix or prefix in placenames to note the presence of fortification. It was a word for hill with ancient Gauls, Britons, and Saxons. It is also a latinization of the word "dun", separately evolved on the continent, but to the same meaning – a fortification or a hill – in several languages, particularly Gothic. As such, variations of this placename are one of the most commonly recurring naming group for places in Ireland and an identifiable feature in placenames both in Britain and throughout much of Europe. It is similar in meaning to the Old English dün meaning "down", "hill" or "mountain" and used in such English place names as Ashdown, Bredon and Snowdon.

Use of Dunum in placenames may indicate a Belgic origin for some of the tribes of Ireland. It was the name of the chief town of the Cauci, an early Irish tribe documented by Ptolemy in the second century, who may have been Belgic, and were related to the Chauci from what is now northern Germany.
