= Downpatrick =

Town in County Down, Northern Ireland

Coordinates: 54.322°N 5.703°W

Downpatrick: Irish: Dún Pádraig
- Town
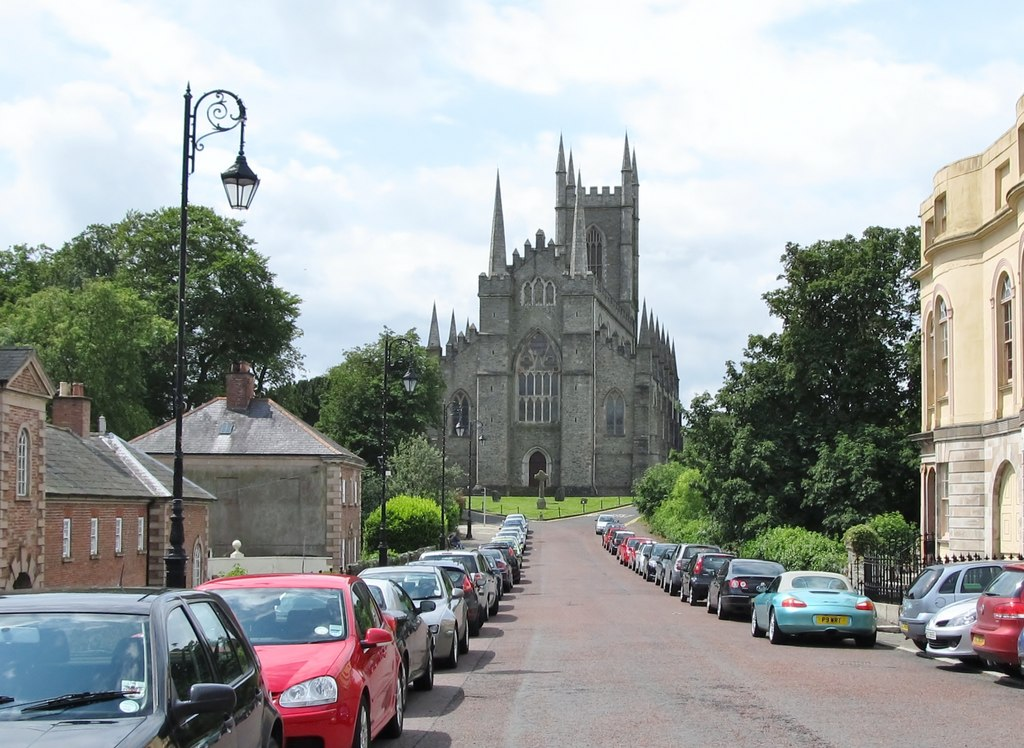
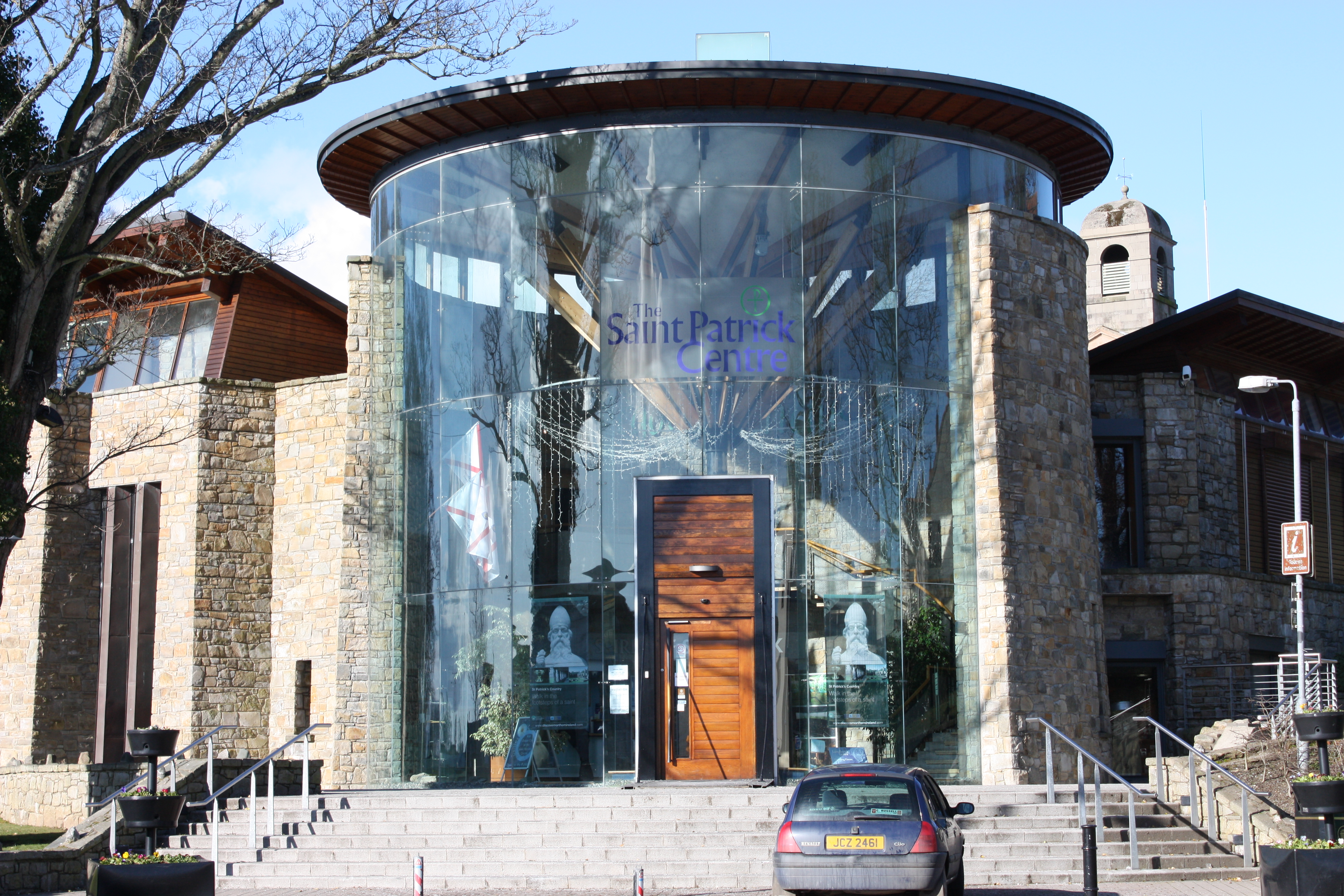
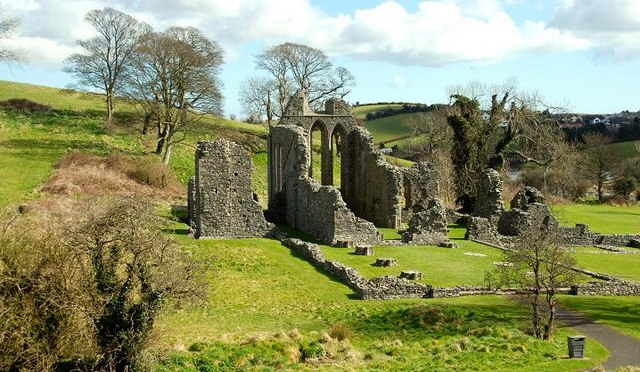
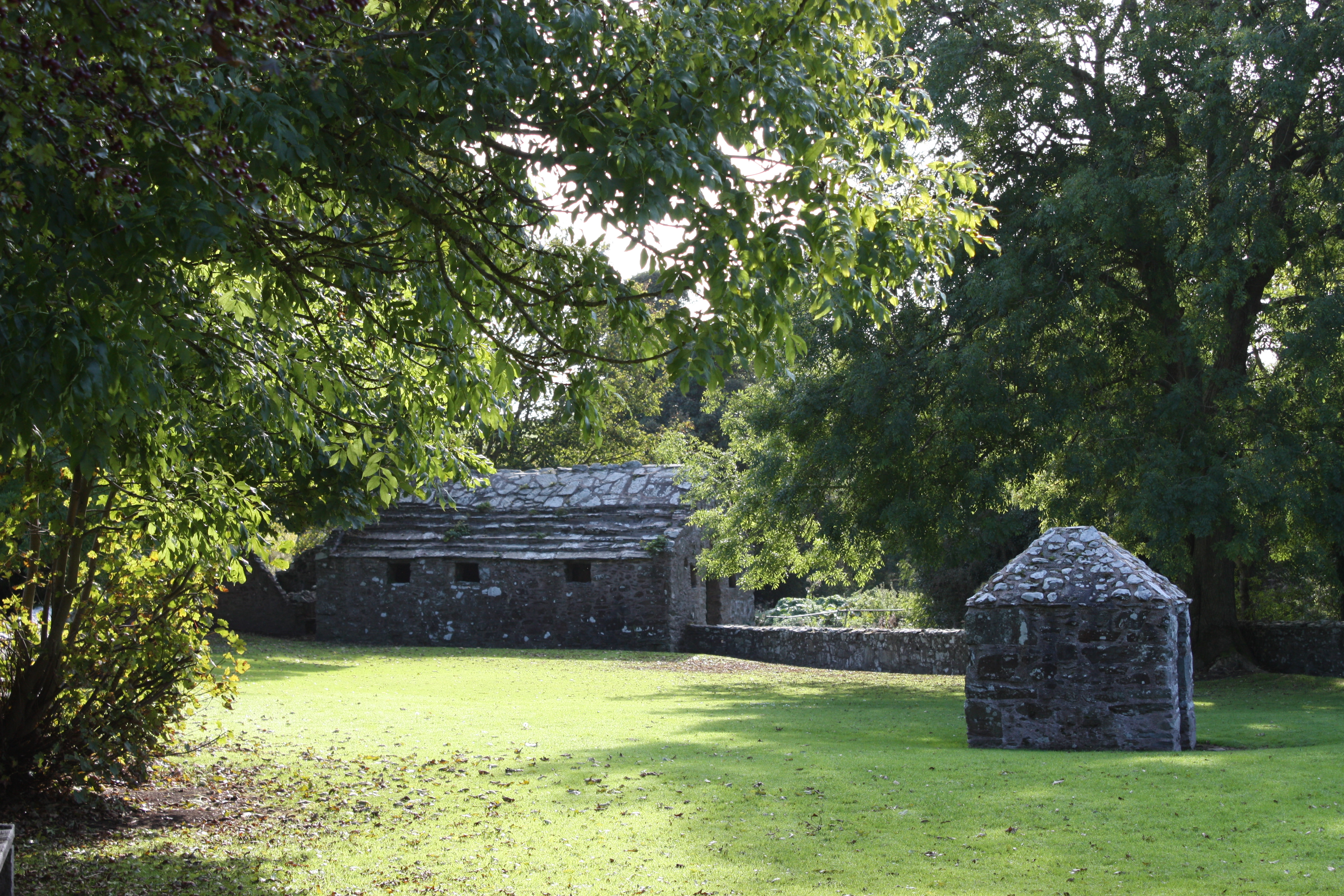
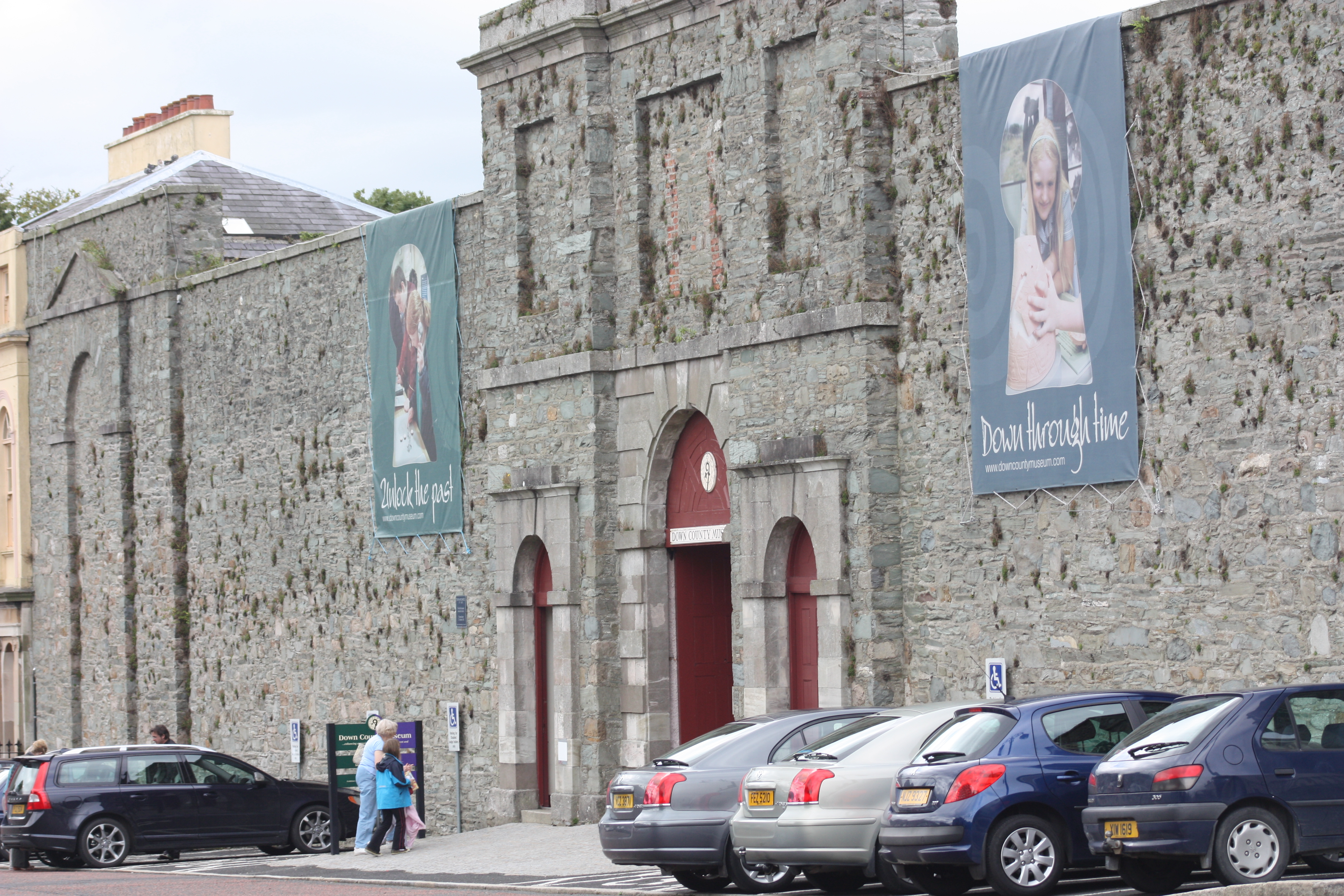
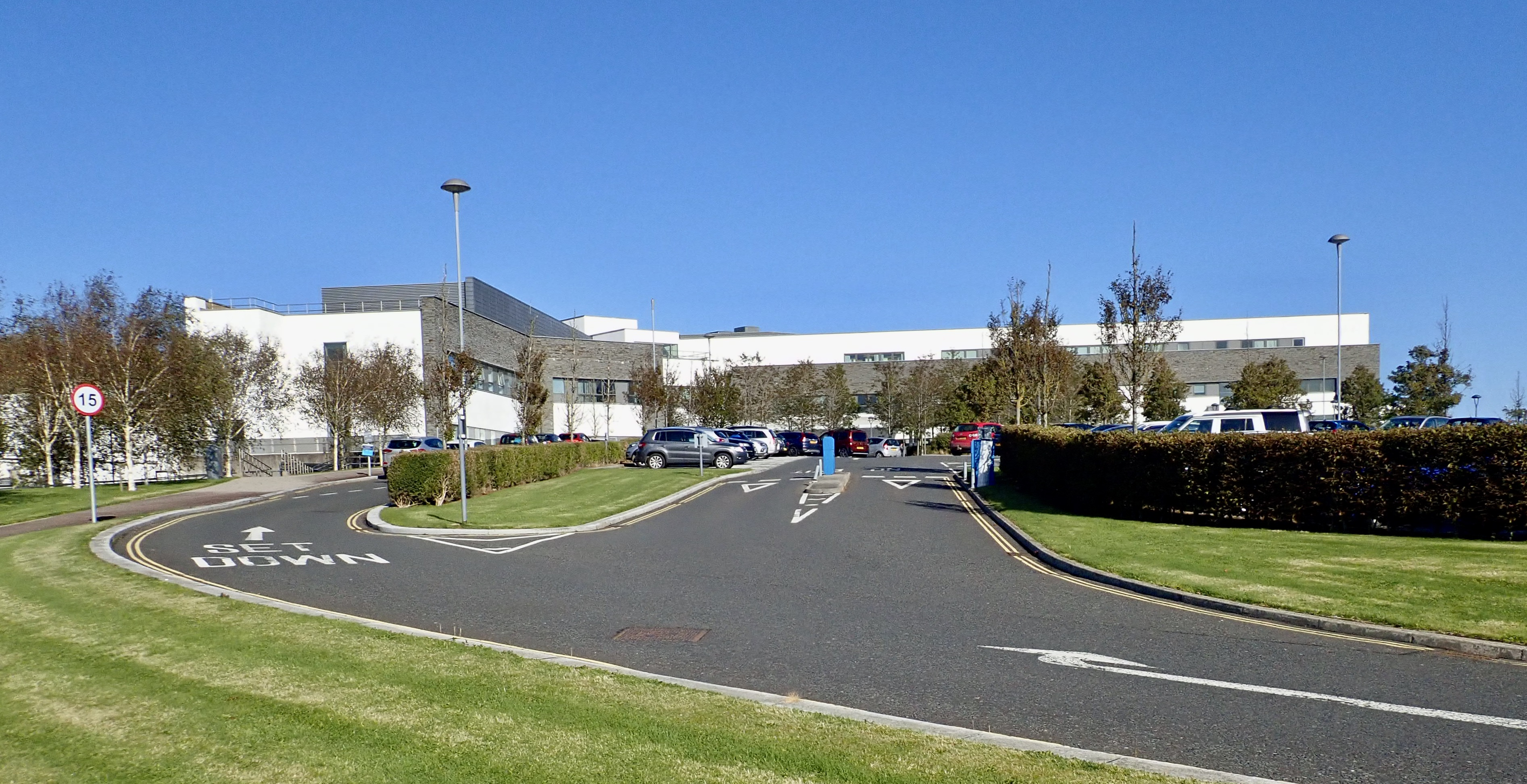
- Top: Down Cathedral, Middle: Saint Patrick Centre, Inch Abbey, Struell Wells, Down County Museum, Bottom: Downe Hospital

- Location within County Down
- Population: 11,545 (2021 census)
- District: Newry, Mourne and Down
- County: County Down
- Country: Northern Ireland
- Sovereign state: United Kingdom
- Post town: Downpatrick
- Postcode district: BT30
- Dialling code: 028
- Police: Northern Ireland
- Fire: Northern Ireland
- Ambulance: Northern Ireland
- UK Parliament: South Down
- NI Assembly: South Down

Downpatrick (from Irish Dún Pádraig, meaning 'Patrick's fort') is a historic town in County Down, Northern Ireland. It is on the Lecale peninsula, about 21 mi (34 km) south of Belfast. In the Middle Ages, it was the capital of the Dál Fiatach, the main ruling dynasty of Ulaid. Its cathedral is said to be the burial place of Saint Patrick. Today, it is the county town of Down and the joint headquarters of Newry, Mourne and Down District Council. Downpatrick had a population of 11,545 according to the 2021 census.

== History ==
=== Pre-history ===
An early Bronze Age site was excavated in the Meadowlands area of Downpatrick, revealing two roundhouses, one was four metres across and the other was over seven metres across. Archaeological excavations in the 1950s found what was thought to be a Bronze Age hillfort on Cathedral Hill, but further work in the 1980s revealed that this was a much later rampart surrounding an early Christian monastery.

=== Early history ===
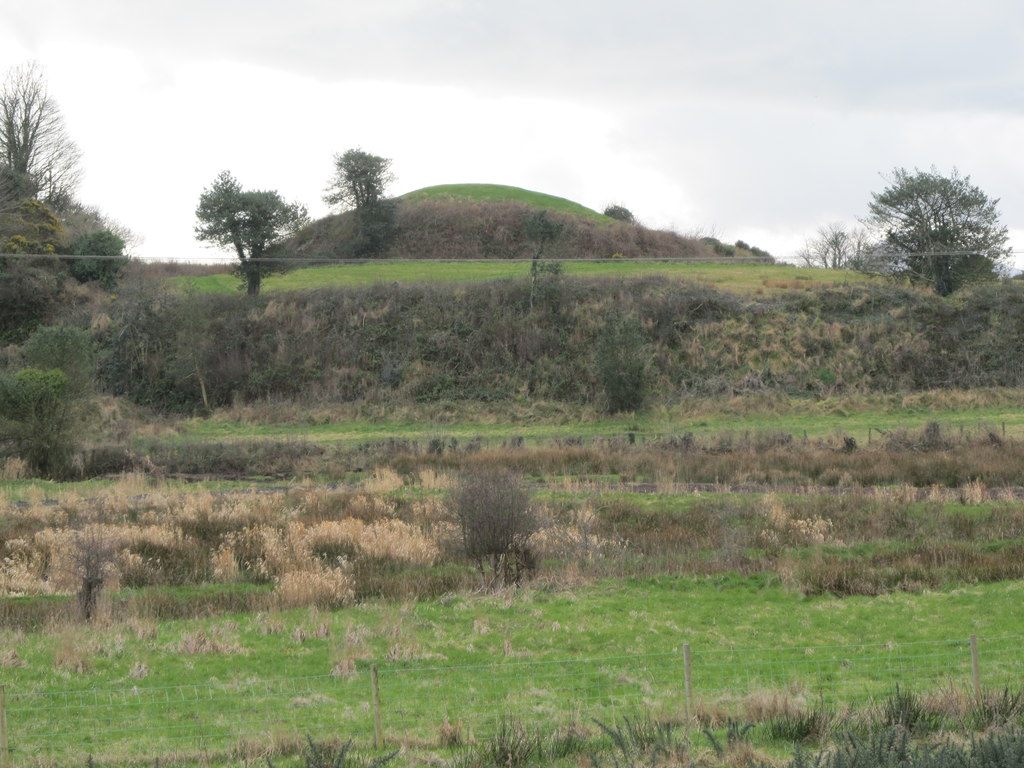
The remains of the 'Mound of Down'.

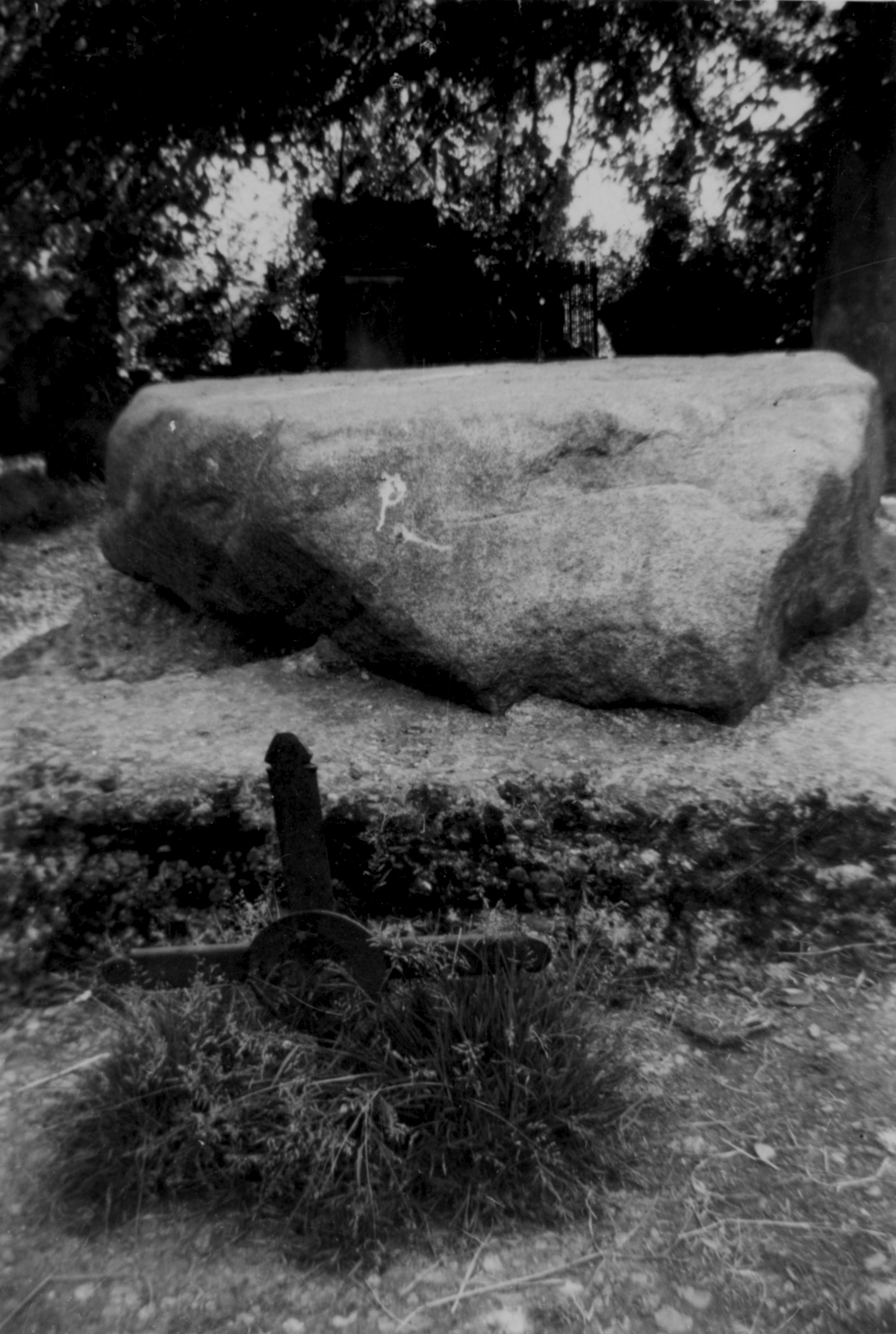
Reputed grave of St Patrick

Downpatrick is one of Ireland's oldest towns. It takes its name from a dún, a medieval royal fort, which stood on a drumlin overlooking the River Quoile. In the Middle Ages, the river was an estuary that would have surrounded the drumlin on most sides. It is believed that there was a ringfort on the site in the early Middle Ages. This may have been the site called Ráth Celtchair (later anglicized Rathkeltair), the 'fort of Celtchar', after a hero in the Ulster Cycle of Irish mythology.

A small Christian monastic settlement was also built on the neighbouring drumlin to the south, now known as 'Cathedral Hill'. Nearby Saul Monastery was associated with Saint Patrick. The saint is said to have been buried on Cathedral Hill in the 5th century, and his reputed grave is still a place of pilgrimage. Down Cathedral was later built on this spot.

In the early 11th century, a much bigger fort with earthen ramparts was built on the northern drumlin, now known as the 'Mound of Down'. This was the capital of the Dál Fiatach, the main ruling dynasty of Ulaidh (Ulster), who held the title "Rí Uladh", "King of Ulster". Deirdre Flanagan suggests that the older name Dún Lethglaise referred to Cathedral Hill, while Dún da Lethglas was the name of this new royal residence.

The King of Norway, Magnus Barefoot, was killed in an ambush near Downpatrick in 1102. It is believed his grave is marked by a mound at Horse Island, southwest of Cathedral Hill.

Saint Malachy became the Bishop of Down (Dún da Lethglas) in 1137. He administered the diocese from Bangor and introduced a community of Augustinians (canons) to Dún da Lethglas dedicated to St John the Evangelist. Malachy and his successors repaired and enlarged Down Cathedral.

In the late 12th century, the area was conquered by Anglo-Normans led by John de Courcy, becoming part of his Earldom of Ulster. In February 1177, a Norman army of 300 men and 20 knights marched north from Dublin and took the town by surprise. The King of Ulster and Dál Fiatach, Ruaidrí mac Duinn Sléibe (Rory MacDunleavy), tried to retake the town, but was forced to withdraw after a fierce battle. The Normans began building a motte (fortified mound) inside the older royal fort, but abandoned it when de Courcy made Carrickfergus his capital in 1178.

In 1183, de Courcy brought in Benedictine monks from the abbey of St Werburgh in Chester (today Chester Cathedral), England. He built a friary for them at Downpatrick; this building was destroyed by an earthquake in 1245. He also re-dedicated the cathedral to Saint Patrick, giving it the name Ecclesia S. Patricii Duni in Latin. It is claimed that de Courcy miraculously found the bones of St Patrick, St Brigid and St Colmcille at Downpatrick. In the presence of the Papal Legate, Vivian, the relics were reburied inside the cathedral on 9 June 1196. This story of their discovery is thought to have been crafted by de Courcy for political reasons. In the Anglo-Norman and later medieval era the town's name in Latin and English documentation is variously 'Dunum', 'Dun' or 'Down'. The oldest surviving record of the name 'Downpatrick' is in the Bodley Survey of the early 1600s.

In 1260 Brian O'Neill, King of Tír Eoghain (Tyrone) and claimed High King of Ireland, marched to Downpatrick, which was then part of the Anglo-Norman earldom of Ulster. Allied with a Connacht force under Hugh O'Conor, he fought the Anglo-Normans in the Battle of Down. O'Neill was killed and the Irish were defeated. The death of O'Neill and defeat of the Irish was lamented in a poem by the Cenél nEógain bard Giolla Brighde Mac Con Midhe (1210–1272).

The earldom collapsed in the 1300s, but the English retained a foothold in Lecale. In 1375, Niall O'Neill of Tyrone defeated the English at Dundalethglas.

=== Reformation and aftermath ===
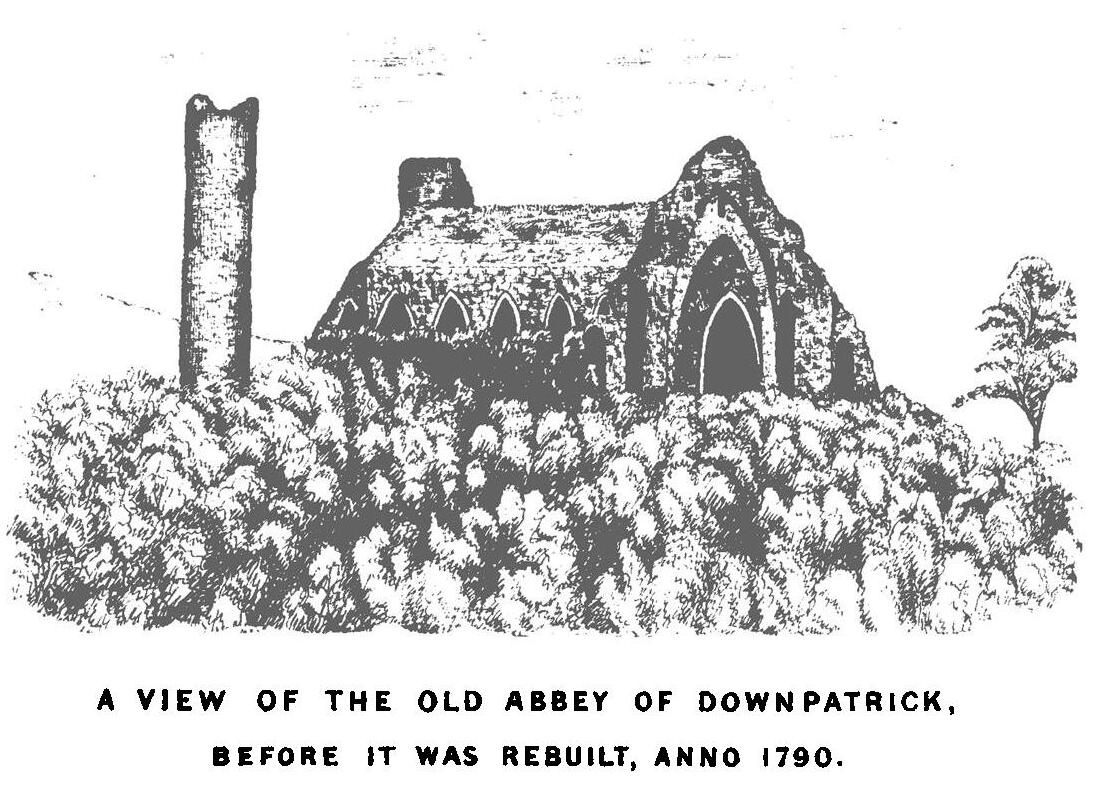
A view of the old Abbey of Downpatrick, before it was rebuilt, anno 1790

Under orders from King Henry VIII of England, Downpatrick's monastic community was dissolved by the English around 1540, and the cathedral fell into ruins. In 1600, the cathedral was allegedly burnt by English forces led by Edward Cromwell. A painting from 1788 shows the abbey ruins and its round tower.

The Archbishop of Armagh, composer of Irish bardic poetry and Christian poetry in the Classical Gaelic literary language, and Franciscan Counter-Reformation theologian Aodh Mac Cathmhaoil was born outside Downpatrick in 1571. On 21 January 1575, Franciscans John Lochran, Donagh O'Rorke, and Edmund Fitzsimon were hanged by Protestants at Downpatrick.

After his 25 April 1681 assassination by his foster brother, Art McCall O'Hanlon near Hilltown, County Down, rapparee leader Count Redmond O'Hanlon's severed head was displayed spiked upon Downpatrick Gaol. The count's body was buried in the Roman Catholic cemetery at Ballynabeck, on the road between Tandragee and Scarva.

Cathedral Hill was the subject of an archaeological investigation in series 5 of the Channel 4 Time Team programme.

=== 18th century ===
Four main thoroughfares are shown converging on a town plan of 1724, namely English Street, Scotch (now Saul) Street, Barrack (now Scotch) Street, and Irish Street. The landscape limited the growth of the town. The early-18th-century street plan continued largely unchanged until 1838 when Church Street was built, followed by Market Street in 1846.

The condition of the town was greatly improved in the 18th century by a land-owning family named Southwell. The first Edward Southwell was responsible for building a shambles in 1719 and paving of the streets, which started in 1727. In 1717 he built a quay and grain store at Quoile Quay, contributing to the economic growth of the town. The second Edward Southwell was responsible for building Southwell School in 1733.

Down County Infirmary was established in a house in Saul Street in October 1767, where it operated for seven years. It was moved to Barrack Lane (now Fountain Street) where the former Horse Barracks was bought in 1774 for £150 by Bernard Ward, 1st Viscount Bangor for use as the infirmary. It was used until the new Infirmary (later known as the Downe Hospital) was opened in 1834.

In June 1778, John Wesley, the founder of Methodism, preached in the new preaching house in Downpatrick and in The Grove beside the ruins of Down Cathedral, which he called a "noble ruin".

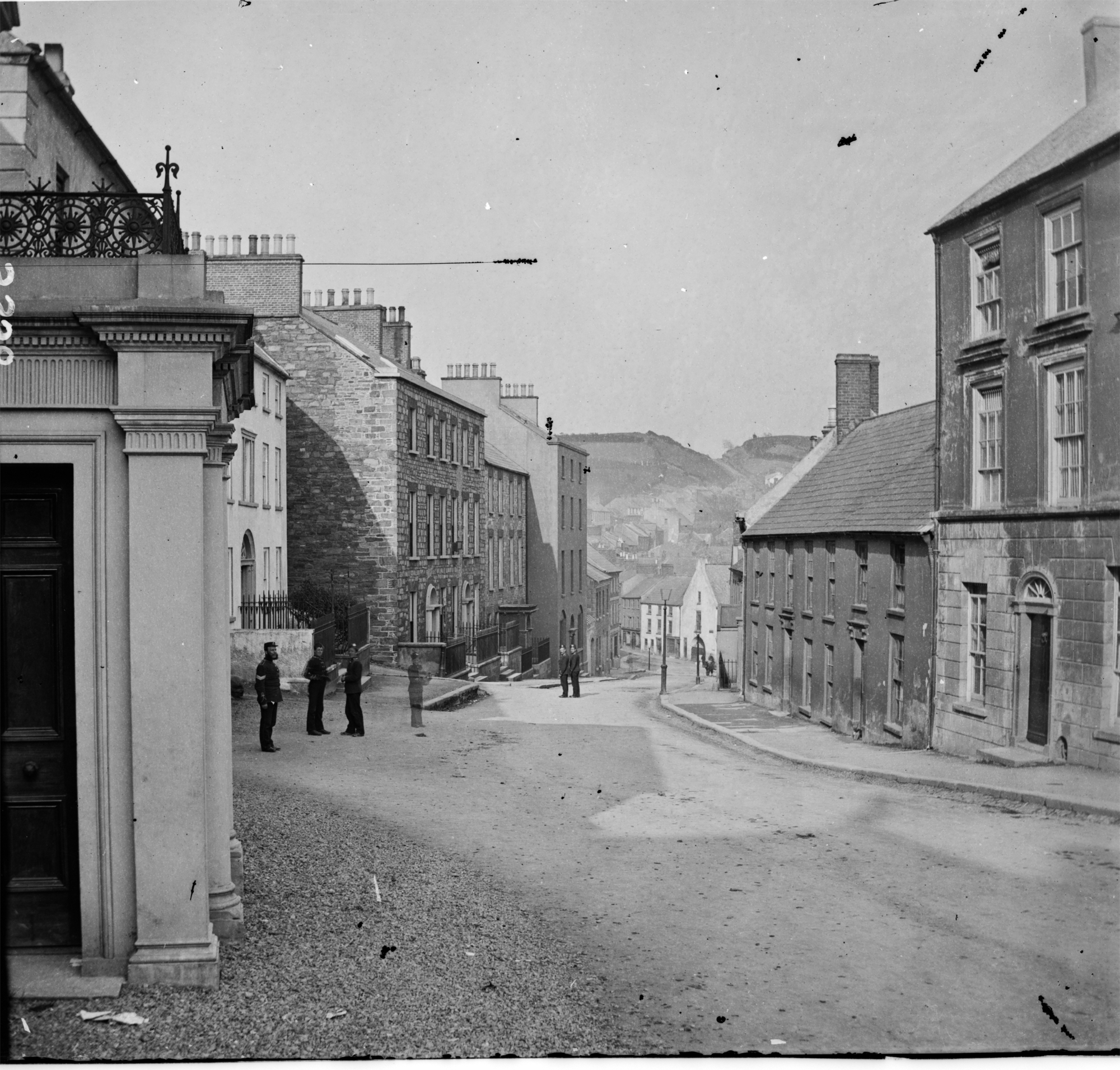
Downpatrick in the late 19th century

=== 19th century ===
On 21 October 1803, a co-founder and leader of the United Irishmen, Thomas Russell, was hanged outside Downpatrick Gaol for his part in trying to raise local United Irishmen and Defenders in support of Robert Emmet's rebellion in July of that year. Russell is buried in the graveyard of the Anglican parish Church of Downpatrick, St Margaret's, in a grave paid for by his friend Mary Ann McCracken, sister of leading Belfast United Irishman Henry Joy McCracken who had been hanged in 1798.

In his role as barrister, Daniel O'Connell, "The Liberator", was called away from London to Downpatrick to attend the County Down Assizes, as counsel in a case heard on 1 April 1829. As the leading campaigner for Catholic Emancipation, he had been in London for the parliamentary passage of the Roman Catholic Relief Act 1829 which lifted the sacramental test bar to Catholics entering the British Parliament. On 2 April 1829, O'Connell attended a public dinner at Downpatrick in his honour, along with "upwards of eighty gentlemen, of different religious persuasions".

The population at the time of the 1841 census was 4,651 inhabitants.

On St Patrick's Day, 17 March 1848, a crowd of 2,000–3,000 Catholics set off from Old Course Road intending to parade to the reputed grave of St Patrick on Cathedral Hill. They were attacked by Protestant Orangemen at the Irish Street shambles and a riot ensued.

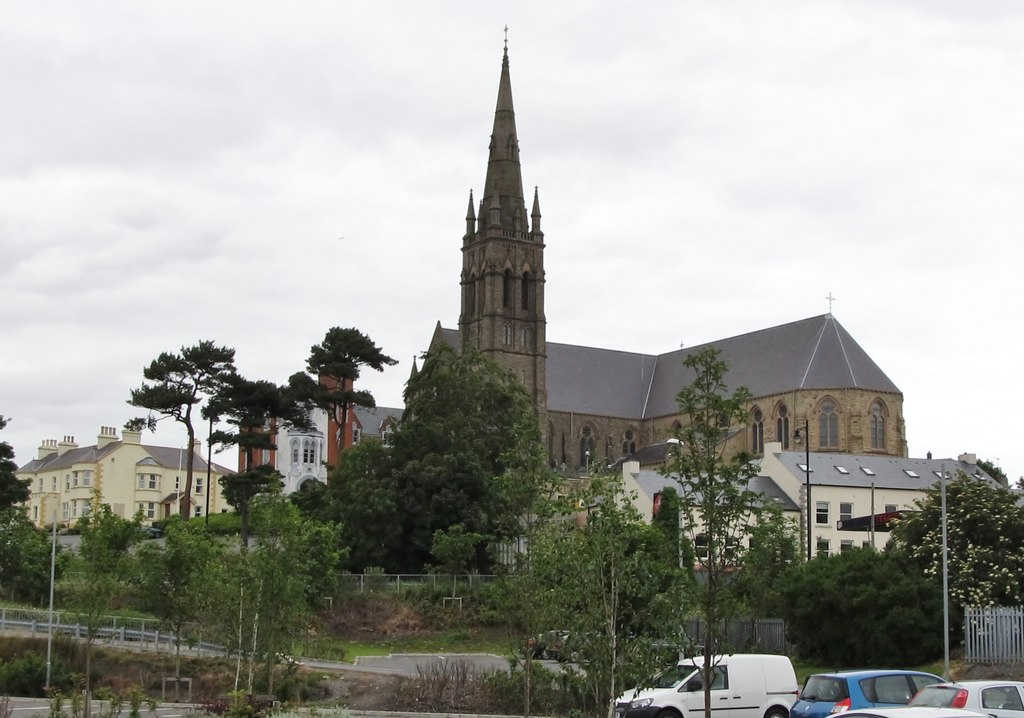
St Patrick's Catholic Church

=== The Troubles ===
There were many gun attacks and bombings in Downpatrick during the Troubles. The deadliest incident was the Downpatrick landmine attack on 9 April 1990. The Provisional Irish Republican Army (IRA) detonated a massive improvised land mine under a British Army convoy on Ballydugan Road, just outside the town. Four soldiers of the Ulster Defence Regiment (UDR) were killed

== Places of interest ==
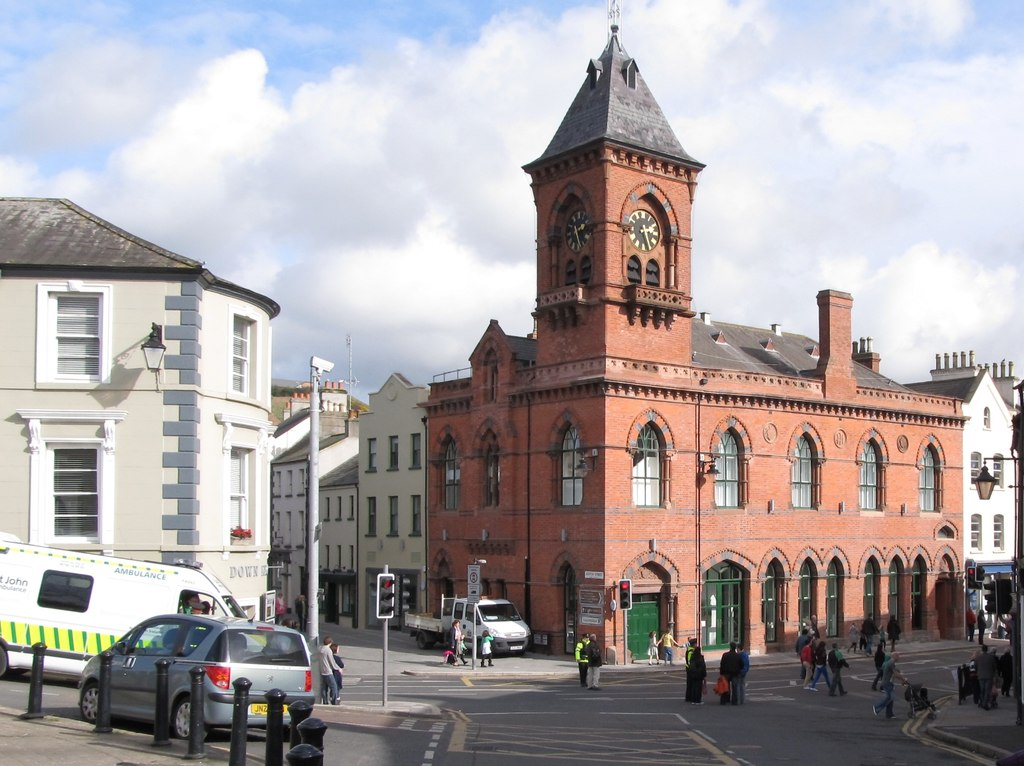
The Down Arts Centre, located in the former Downpatrick Town Hall

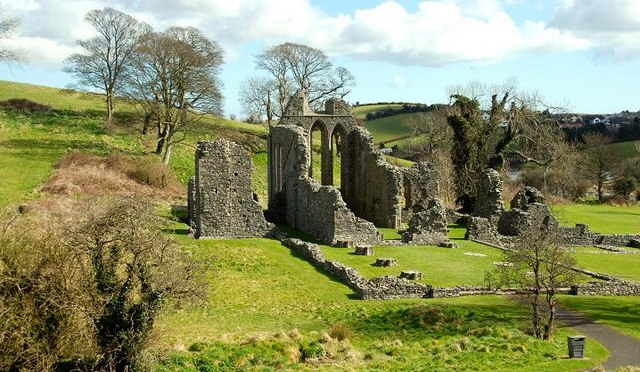
Inch Abbey

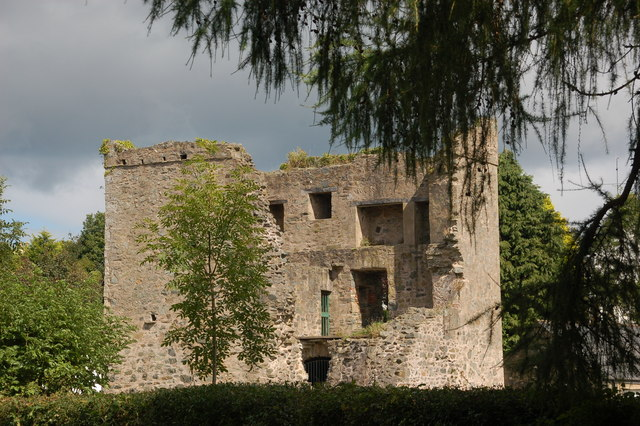
Quoile Castle, near Downpatrick

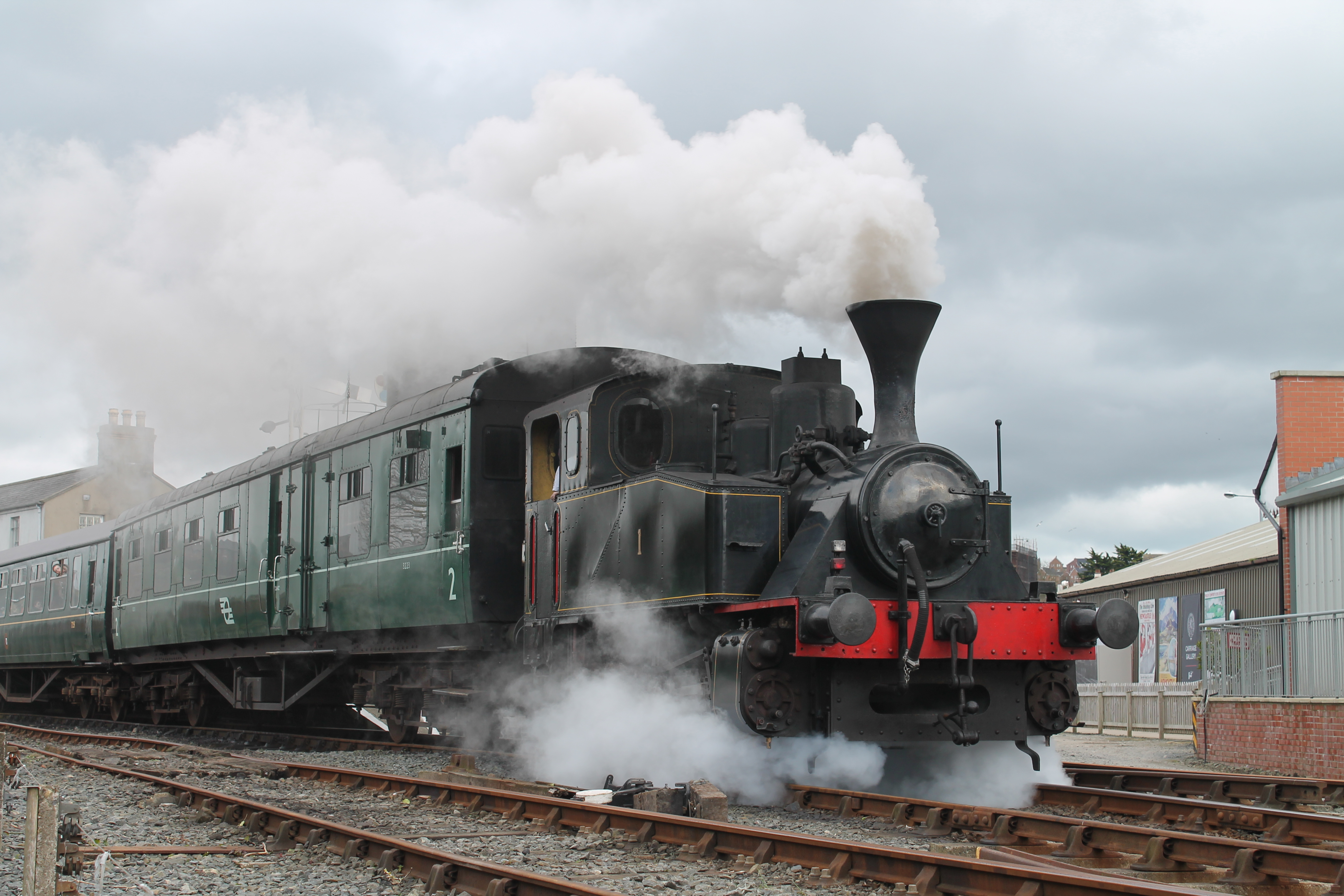
Steam locomotive O&K No. 1 operating at the Downpatrick and County Down Railway

- Ballyalton Court Cairn is a single court grave situated on a rock outcrop by the roadside 0.5 miles (0.80 km) from Ballyalton village, which is 2.25 miles (3.62 km) east of Downpatrick, at grid ref 531 448.
- Ballynoe stone circle, a large circle of over 50 closely spaced upright stones, surrounding a mound which, when excavated, was found to contain two cists in which cremated bones were found, is only 2.5 miles (4 km) south in the hamlet of Ballynoe. The site is near the disused railway station, reached by a long footpath off the main road, at grid ref: J481404.
- The Down Arts Centre, located in the former Downpatrick Town Hall, is an events venue in the town.
- Down County Museum is located on the Mall in English Street in Downpatrick and was formerly the old Down County Gaol. It was built between 1789 and 1796 at the behest of the County Grand Jury of Down under the supervision of Marquess of Downshire, the Earl of Hillsborough and the Hon Edward Ward, and was designed by architect Charles Lilly. The building served for a time as a barracks for the South Down Militia. It is famously where, at its gates, United Irishman Thomas Russell was hanged in 1803.
- Downpatrick Racecourse is located on the Ballydugan Road on the outskirts of Downpatrick. Horse racing has been held at Downpatrick under the charter of James II of England.
- Downpatrick and County Down Railway is Ireland's only full-sized heritage railway. Built on the BCDR's former line to Belfast, it links the town with Inch Abbey and various other places of historical interest. The railway houses Ireland's largest collection of Victorian carriages, eight diesel locomotives, three steam engines, and several railcars.
- Inch Abbey, a large, ruined Cistercian monastic site featuring early Gothic architecture, is 0.75 miles (1.2 km) north-west of Downpatrick on the north bank of the River Quoile off the main road to Belfast, at grid ref: J477455.
- The Lecale peninsula covers an area of some 78 square miles (200 km^{2}) between Downpatrick and Dundrum. It is an area of historical and geographic significance.
- The Mound of Down or Rathkeltair is one of the major earthworks of Ulster, situated on the northwest edge of Downpatrick, it is a good example of an Iron Age defensive earthwork in the middle of which a Norman Motte and Bailey was built by John de Courcy after his defeat of Rory Mac Donlevy in 1177. Some believe that it was the residence of Celtchar mac Ulthechair, the legendary Iron Age hero of the Ulster Cycle. It seems to have become the administrative centre of the kings of Dál Fiatach by the early Christian period.
- St Patricks Centre Downpatrick with the Tara Brooch Statue and Down Cathedral
  St. Patrick Centre is the only permanent exhibition in the world dedicated to the patron saint of Ireland. As a nonprofit educational organisation offers of reconciliation in Northern Ireland, thousands of children each year and the ongoing cross-border and international youth programs.
- Quoile Castle is a ruined 16th-century tower house, just off the main road from Downpatrick to Strangford, at grid ref: J4963 4701.
- Struell Wells is a set of four holy wells 1.5 miles (2.4 km) east of Downpatrick (grid ref: J513442). The wells date from before the time of Saint Patrick, and even today are used for people seeking cures.
- The Eclipse cinema, now an Omniplex, opened in 2009. The first cinema in Downpatrick was the Pavilion on St Patrick's Avenue in 1917, followed by the Grand on Market St in 1935.
- Lough Money is about 3 miles (4.8 km) from the town. A rainbow trout fishery is maintained there for anglers.
- Saul Church is about 3 miles from the town, built in 1932 to commemorate St Patrick's first church in Ireland.

The cathedral features in the US sitcom It's Always Sunny in Philadelphia.

== St Patrick's Day parade ==
St Patrick's Day is celebrated in Downpatrick through an annual cross-community parade which goes through the centre of the town. This is the one day of the year that Downpatrick closes its main streets so that celebrations can begin. The celebrations occurs every year on 17 March. Newry, Mourne and Down District Council in recent years have lengthened the celebrations from one day to the entire week full of history exhibitions and family events.

Downpatrick's St Patrick's Day celebrations are also popular for tourists especially because of the town's history of St Patrick and because of his burial site.

== Demography ==
National Identity of Downpatrick residents (2021)
Nationality	Per cent
Irish	50.7%
Northern Irish	33.6%
British	18.4%

=== 2021 census ===
On census day (21 March 2021) there were 11,545 people living in Downpatrick. Of these:

- 83.6% belong to or were brought up in the Catholic faith and 10.4% belong to or were brought up in a 'Protestant and other Christian (including Christian related)' denominations.
- 13.90% (1,605) had some knowledge of Irish (Gaeilge) and 2.31% (267) had some knowledge of Ulster-Scots

=== 2011 census ===
On census day (27 March 2011) there were 10,822 people living in Downpatrick (4,179 households), accounting for 0.60% of the NI total, and representing an increase of 4.9% on the Census 2001 population of 10,316. Of these:

- 22.35% were aged under 16 years and 13.28% were aged 65 and over.
- 51.55% of the usually resident population were female and 48.45% were male.
- 85.51% belong to or were brought up in the Catholic faith and 10.78% belong to or were brought up in a 'Protestant and other Christian (including Christian related)' denominations.
- 42.95% had an Irish national identity, 34.77% had a Northern Irish national identity and 26.58% indicated that they had a British national identity (respondents could indicate more than one national identity).
- 34 years was the average (median) age of the population.
- 13.10% had some knowledge of Irish (Gaeilge) and 3.12% had some knowledge of Ulster-Scots.

== Transport ==
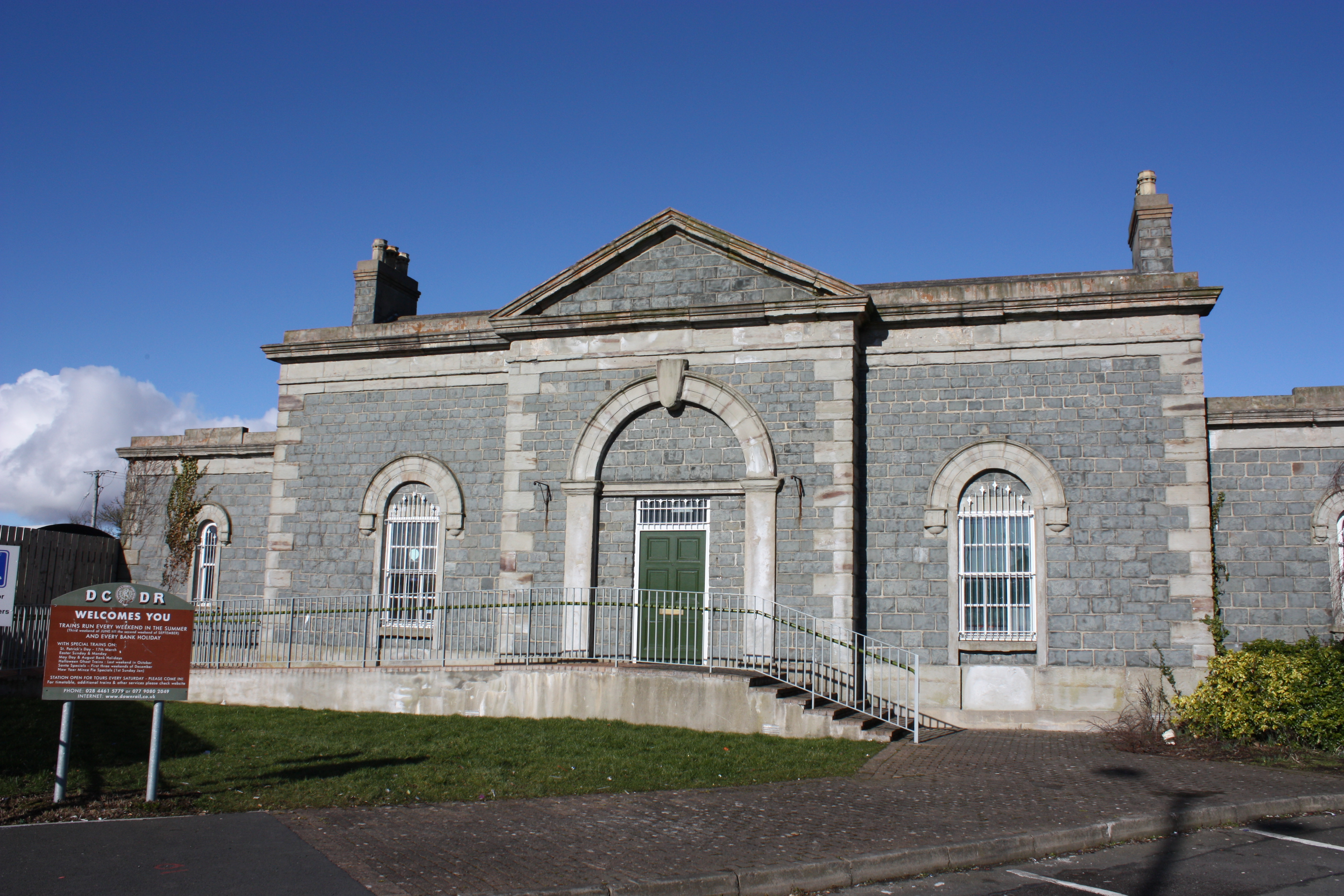
The current Downpatrick railway station

- Downpatrick is situated at the junction of the A7 (Downpatrick to Saintfield and Belfast) road, the A25 (Downpatrick to Newry and Dublin) road and the A2 coast road. While there are no rail services in Downpatrick, Ulsterbus provides bus services to and from the Downpatrick Bus Station.
- Downpatrick railway station on the Belfast and County Down Railway, opened on 23 March 1859 and Downpatrick Loop Platform opened on 24 September 1892. Both closed on 16 January 1950. Downpatrick Racecourse Platform had opened on 8 March 1893, but closed in September 1949. The current station, owned by the Downpatrick and County Down Railway, was opened in the early 1990s and serves several sites of historical interest near the town, having originally been a gas manager's office situated elsewhere in Downpatrick.
- Translink also holds the aforementioned bus station on the Ballydugan Road providing bus services to Belfast, Bangor and Newry alongside services to local towns and townlands.

== Education ==
=== Primary schools ===
- Downpatrick Primary School – "controlled" Primary School.
- Bunscoil Naomh Pádraig (St Patrick's Primary School) – Irish Speaking Primary School.
- St Brigid's Primary School – Roman Catholic Primary School.
- St Colmcille's Primary School – Roman Catholic Primary School.
- Our Lady & St Patrick Primary School – Roman Catholic Primary School. (St Patrick's Boys' Primary School & Convent of Mercy Primary School merged to form this school which is situated at the old Convent of Mercy building, with a new school building in the planning stages.)

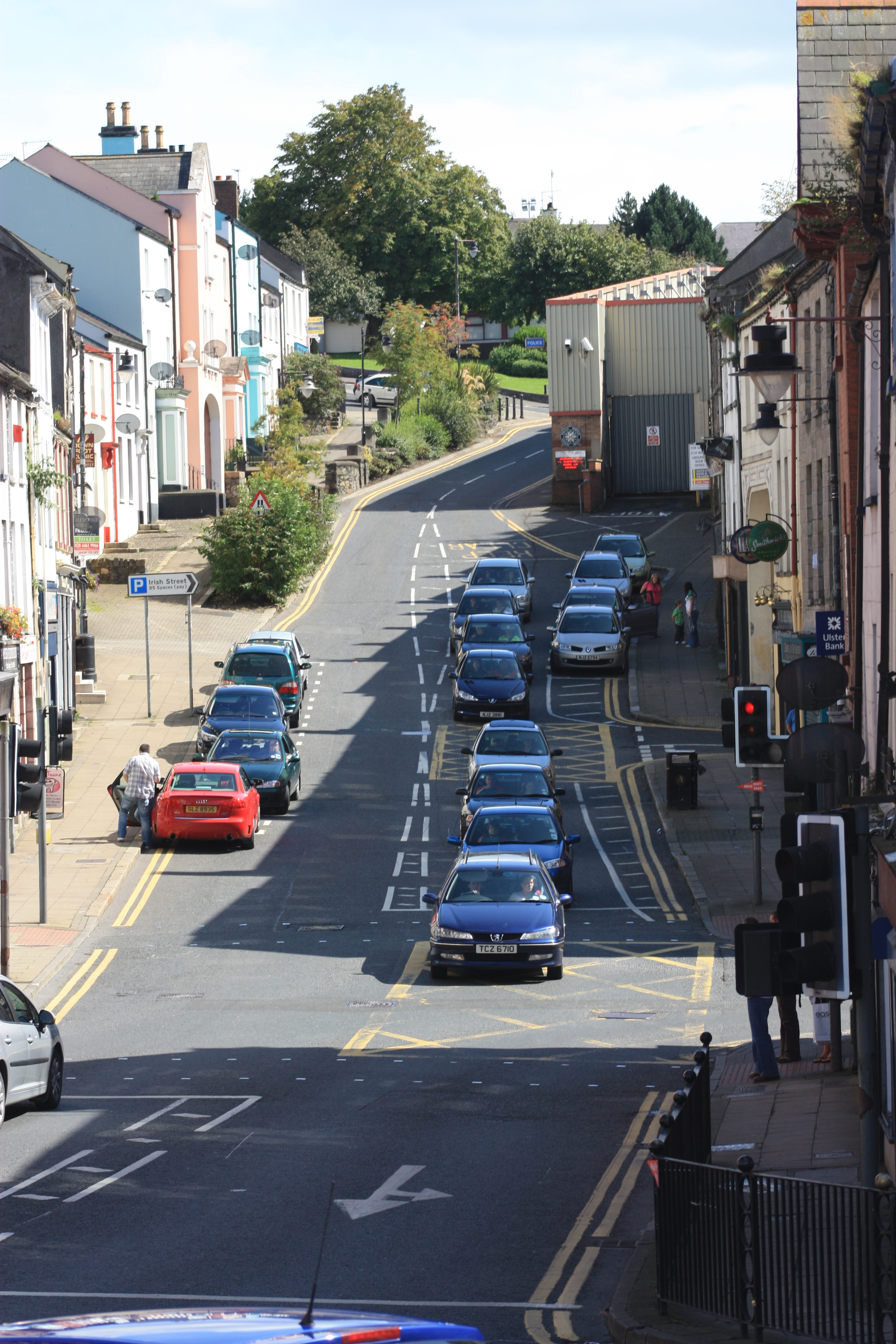
Irish Street, Downpatrick.

=== Post-primary schools ===
- Down High School – (known locally as "The Green High") "Controlled" coeducational Grammar School
- Blackwater Integrated College – Integrated High School
- Lecale Trinity Grammar – mixed sex grammar school (St Mary's High School, St Patrick's Grammar School and De La Salle High School merged to form Lecale Trinity Grammar

=== Further and higher education ===
- South Eastern Regional College ( Downpatrick Campus ) – the local campus of the regional further and higher education college

== People ==
See Category:People from Downpatrick

- Ann Breen, singer, born Downpatrick
- Trevor Carson, Northern Ireland national football team goalkeeper
- Lynn C. Doyle, pseudonym of Leslie Alexander Montgomery (1873–1961), comic writer and playwright, born in Downpatrick
- Maurice Hayes, the former Northern Ireland Ombudsman, chairman of the Ireland Funds and Taoiseach-appointed senator in Seanad Éireann
- Conor Hazard, Northern Ireland international goalkeeper, currently plays for Plymouth Argyle
- E. Neville Isdell, former chairman and CEO of the Coca-Cola Company
- William Johnston of Ballykilbeg (1829–1902), MP for Belfast, Orangeman, tenant righter and women's suffragist
- Patrick Kielty, attended St Patrick's Grammar School, Downpatrick
- Miles Kington, journalist, musician and broadcaster, born in Downpatrick
- George Lowden, custom guitar maker, based in Downpatrick
- Aodh Mac Cathmhaoil (1571–1629), poet, Franciscan theologian and Archbishop of Armagh
- Colin McGrath, South Down SDLP MLA, chairman and party chief whip
- Colin Murphy, comedian
- Margaret Ritchie, Baroness Ritchie of Downpatrick, a former SDLP MP and a former minister in the Northern Ireland Executive
- Thomas Russell (1767–1803) United Irishman executed at Down County Gaol following Robert Emmet's rebellion in 1803. He is honoured in the name of the local GAA.
- Robert Scott (1874–1961) Second Boer War Victoria Cross recipient
- Francis Sheehy-Skeffington, writer and radical activist, raised in Downpatrick
- Tim Wheeler, lead singer of rock band Ash

== Sport and clubs ==
=== Gaelic games ===
Downpatrick is home to Russell Gaelic Union, Downpatrick. The Russell Gaelic Union was formed by an Englishman, a Scotsman, and an Irishman: Willie King, Alex McDowell, and Willie Byrne, respectively, in the county town in the early 20th century. The team traditionally wears green and white hoops. Downpatrick has had mixed fortunes over the years but has still managed to produce excellent county footballers such as Ray McConville, Conor Deegan, and Barry Breen, all of whom won All-Irelands with Down. The club was named in honour of United Irishman, Thomas Russell .

Downpatrick has had a successful handball club since the 1980s when local teacher Martin Murphy established a team. After a number of years it was incorporated into the RGU family.

=== Cricket ===
Downpatrick Cricket Club has won the Irish Senior Cup on two occasions, the NCU Senior League on six occasions and the NCU Challenge Cup on six occasions. The club's Strangford Road ground has hosted Ireland international matches, most recently against Australia "A" and South Africa in 1998.

=== Rugby union ===
The community of Downpatrick also features two rugby union clubs. These clubs are Ballynahinch Rugby Football and Dromore Rugby Football.

=== Association football ===
Downpatrick's most prominent team is Celtic Bhoys which competes in the Amateur League Division 2A, along with teams in Newcastle Premier district League They also have multiple teams competing at Youth level in South Belfast Youth League, and Downpatrick Youth League. Celtic Bhoys FC were formed in 1990 by local men "Snowy Graham" alongside "Malachy Wynn".

There are other clubs associated with the town, and others from surrounding areas, Downpatrick FC, Ballynagross, Rossglass County.

These include Ballynagross F.C and Rossglass County F.C

There are also many youth teams such as the Celtic Bhoys, Ballynagross, Downpatrick FC & Rossglass who along with many other teams in the area, participate in the Downpatrick Youth League. Conor McMenamin from Downpatrick currently plays professional football for St Mirren in Scotland. Most famous football side out of Downpatrick were Downpatrick Rec. who won the Steel & Sons Cup in 1978. Downpatrick is home to one of the biggest Northern Irish branches of the Manchester United Supporters' Club, the Downpatrick Manchester United Supporters' Club, which was founded in 1993, along with Glasgow Celtic Supporters Club "Neil Lennon CSC"

=== Snooker and billiards ===
Downpatrick is also the home of the Downpatrick & District Snooker & Billiard League. Many of the local towns compete in the leagues. Teams from Downpatrick, Newcastle, Ballynahinch, Crossgar, Drumaness, Ballykinler, Castlewellan, Newtownards and Ballyalton play in the local district.

=== Bowls ===
Downpatrick Bowling Club is situated on the Old Belfast Road, Downpatrick. Established in the early 1950s, it is only over the last several years that they have finally enjoyed a sustained period of success. The club won the Irish Bowling Association Junior Cup for the first time in their history in 2006. The following year they once again reached the final only to be beaten by Cookstown in a close encounter. However, the club once again regained the Irish Cup in 2011, with a resounding victory against Kilrea. In 2011 Downpatrick also won the PGL Midweek Division 2 title.

=== Other sports ===
Downpatrick Golf Club has its own club grounds. The town also has its own tennis club, Downpatrick Tennis Club. Downpatrick has several other clubs that use the facilities of the Down Leisure Centre (run by Newry, Mourne and Down District Council) such as the Lecale Amateur Swimming Club, the Downpatrick School of Lifesaving and the East Down Athletics Club. Downpatrick Golf Club is now known as St Patrick's Golf Club.

== Annalistic references ==
See Annals of Inisfallen

- AI1026.5 Mael Petair Ua hAilecáin, lector of Dún dá Lethglas, rested in Christ.

== See also ==
- List of localities in Northern Ireland by population
- Downpatrick (Parliament of Ireland constituency)
- Dunum
- Brian Faulkner, Baron Faulkner of Downpatrick
- Edward Windsor, Lord Downpatrick
