= Basilica of the Fourteen Holy Helpers =

Coordinates: 50°06′56″N 11°03′16″E

Basilica of the Fourteen Saints
- Basilika Vierzehnheiligen
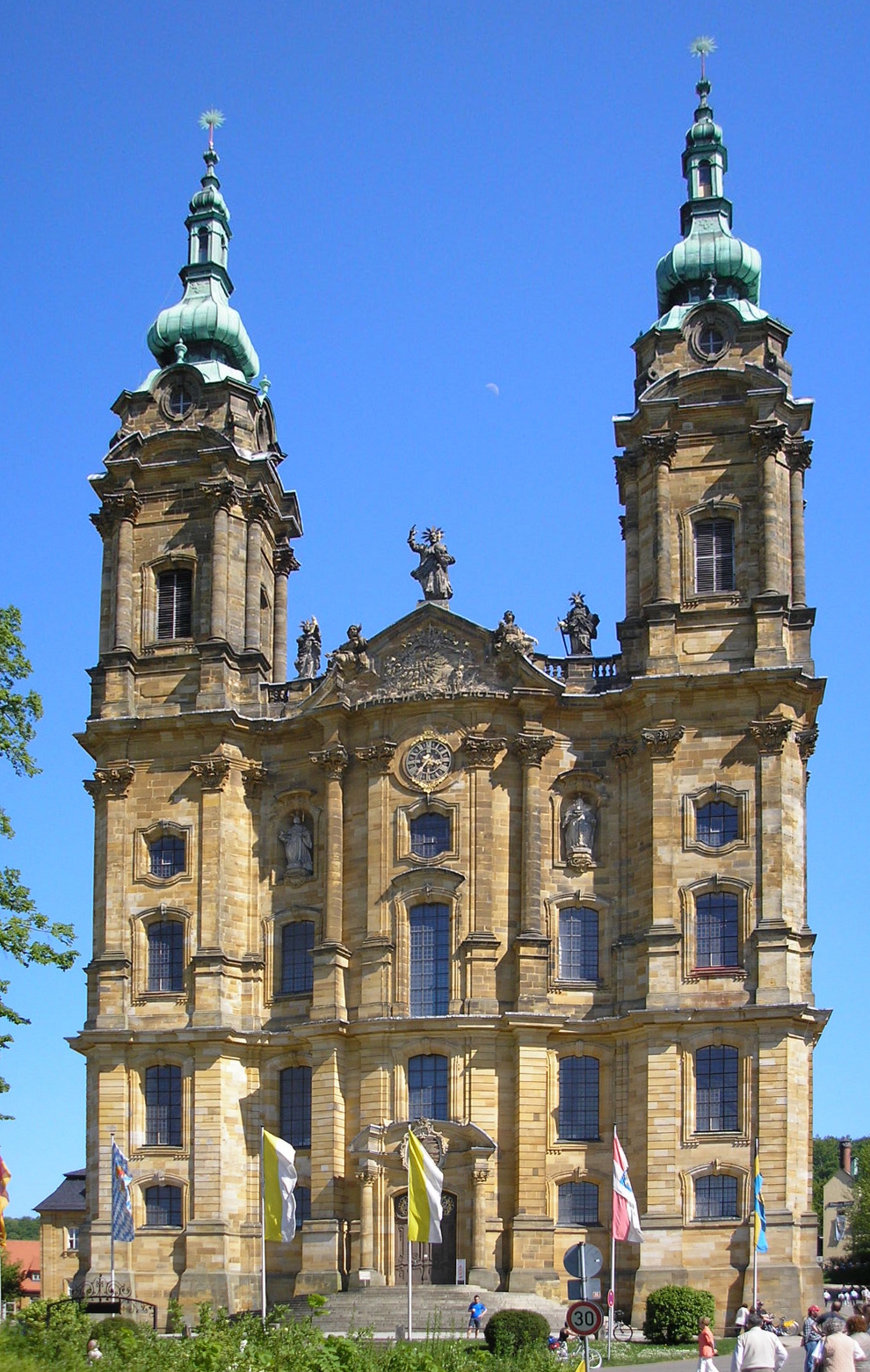
- The Basilica of the Fourteen Saints
- Location: Bad Staffelstein
- Country: Germany
- Denomination: Roman Catholic

History
- Dedication: Fourteen Holy Helpers

Architecture
- Architect: Balthasar Neumann
- Style: late Baroque-Rococo
- Years built: 1743-72

The Basilica of the Fourteen Holy Helpers (German: Basilika Vierzehnheiligen) is a church located near the town of Bad Staffelstein near Bamberg, in Bavaria, southern Germany. The late Baroque (Rococo) basilica, designed by Balthasar Neumann, was constructed between 1743 and 1772. It is dedicated to the Fourteen Holy Helpers, a group of saints venerated together in the Catholic Church, especially in Germany at the time of the Black Death. The interior has been nicknamed "God's Ballroom".

== Location ==
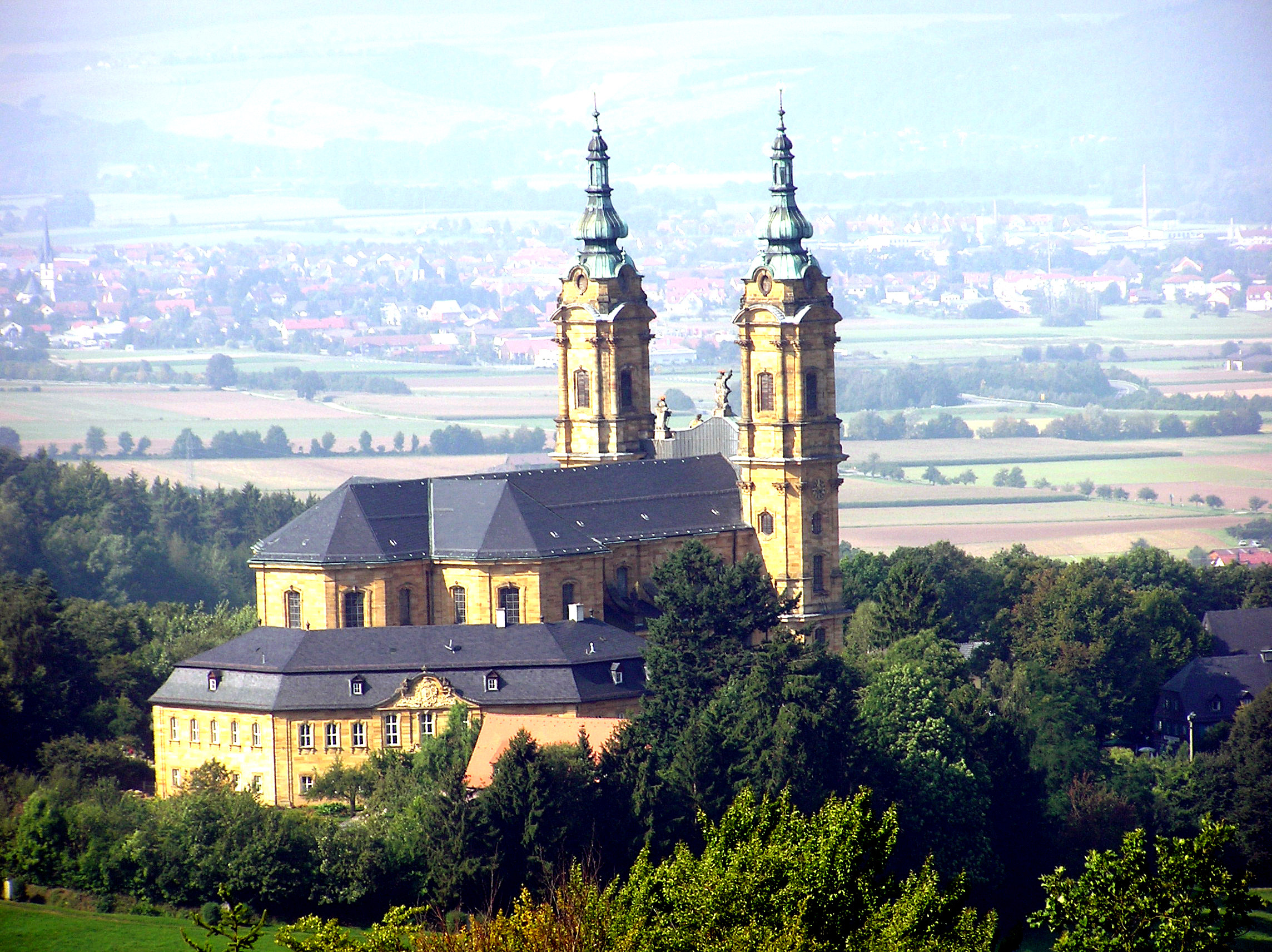
Basilica of the Fourteen Holy Helpers

The Basilica overlooks the river Main in Franconia. It sits on a hillside, and on the hillside opposite is Schloss Banz, a former Baroque abbey. Together they are known as the Goldene Pforte or golden portal, an entryway to the historic Franconian towns of Coburg, Kronach, Kulmbach, and Bayreuth.

== Legend ==
On 24 September 1445, a young shepherd Hermann Leicht saw a crying child in a field near a Cistercian monastery in Langheim. As he bent down to pick up the child, it abruptly disappeared. A short time later, the child reappeared in the same spot along with two floating candles and Hermann reported it to the Cistercians. The next summer, he saw the child a third time. This time, the child bore a red cross on its chest and was accompanied by fourteen other figures. The child said they were the fourteen helpers and would help others if a chapel was erected for them. The two candles descended and the vision disappeared, after which the healing miracles began.

18 days after the third apparition, a fatally ill maid from Langheim was cured after she invoked the help of the Fourteen Holy Helpers. Langheim abbey, which had been previously skeptical concerning the apparitions, recognized them and a pilgrimage was soon begun.

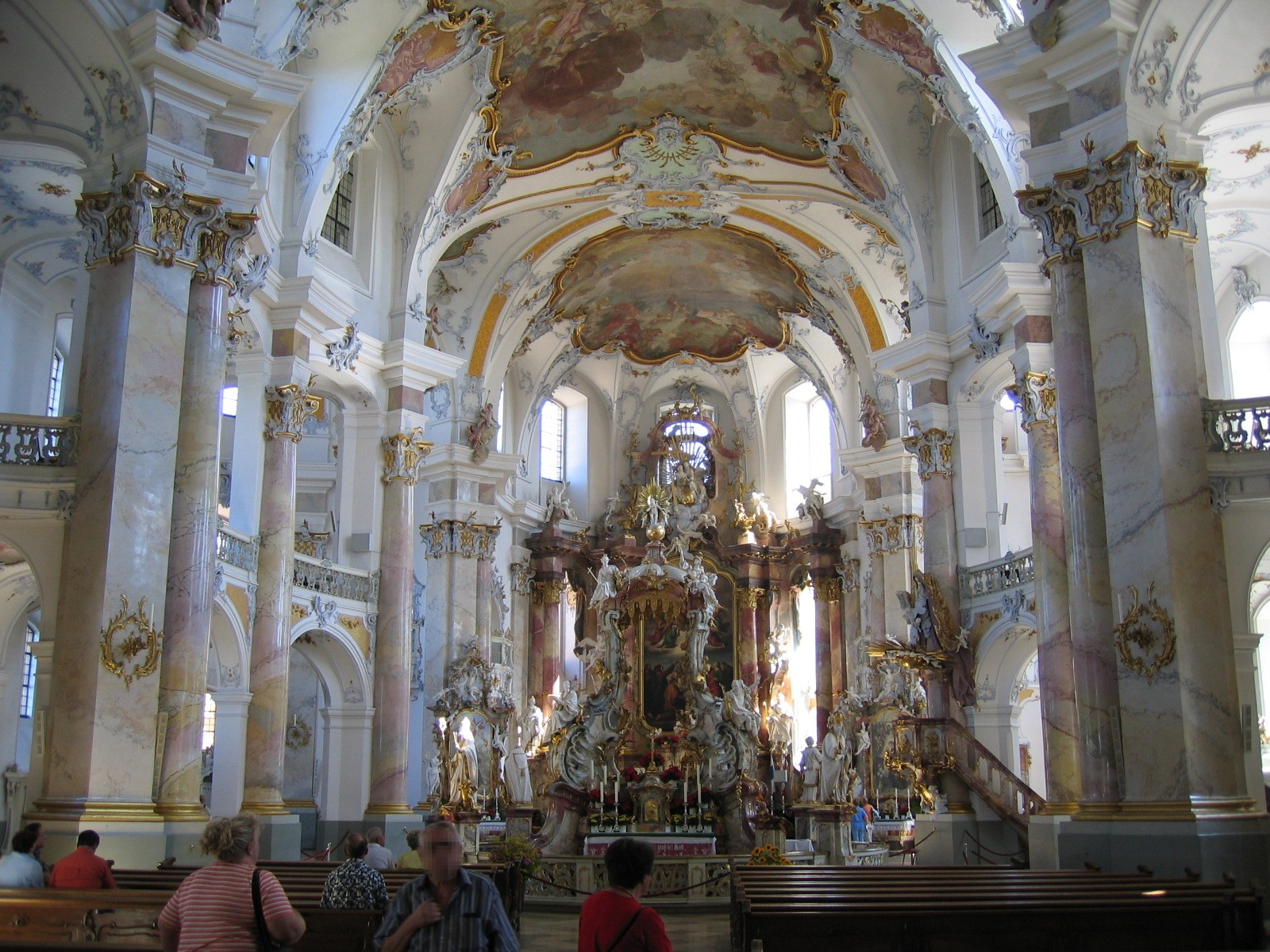
The altar depicts the Fourteen Holy Helpers.

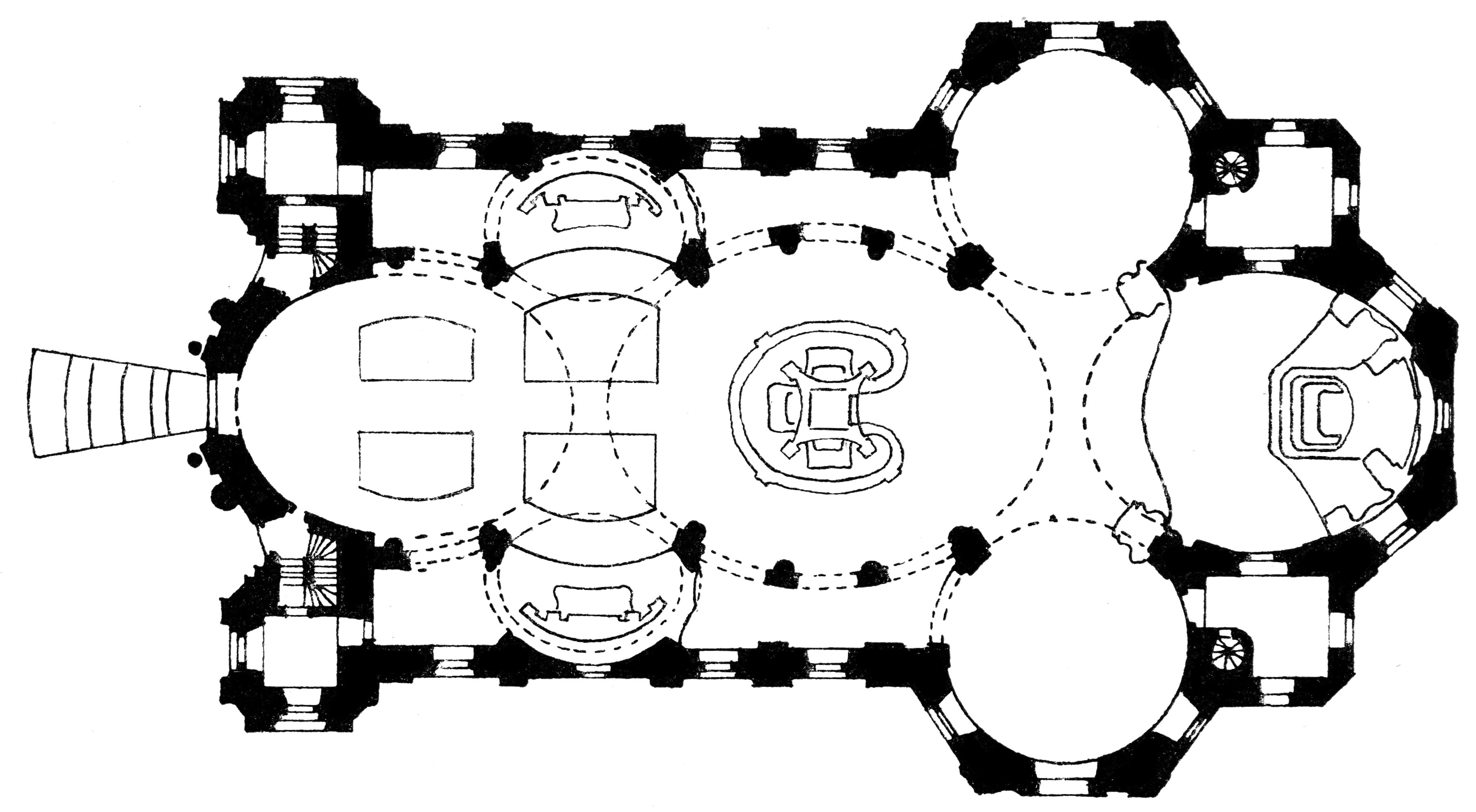
Diagram showing the geometry of the floor plan: ovals and circles meet rectangles.

The Cistercian brothers to whom the land belonged erected a chapel, which immediately attracted pilgrims. An altar was consecrated as early as 1448. Pilgrimages to the Vierzehnheiligen continue to the present day between May and October.

== Construction ==
The present church was built from 1743 to 1772. Its unique interior, in the style of Rococo, is due to an irregularity in the construction. Langheim Abbey wished for the costs of construction to be lowered and thus changed the architectural plans, despite the foundational stone already being laid. When this was discovered by Neumann, the architect, the walls of the three apses had already been erected. The Altar of Grace (which being the site of the apparitions could not be moved) would no longer be located in the center of the crossing as originally intended but in the nave. Neumann thus split the room into three ovals and placed the Altar back in the center by making it the center of the largest oval rotund in the middle, surrounded by four columns on each side.

== The Mercy Altar of the Vierzehnheiligen ==
The Mercy Altar, also known as the Gnadenaltar, marks the site where the apparition of the Fourteen Holy Helpers occurred. The fourteen statues adorning the altar are:

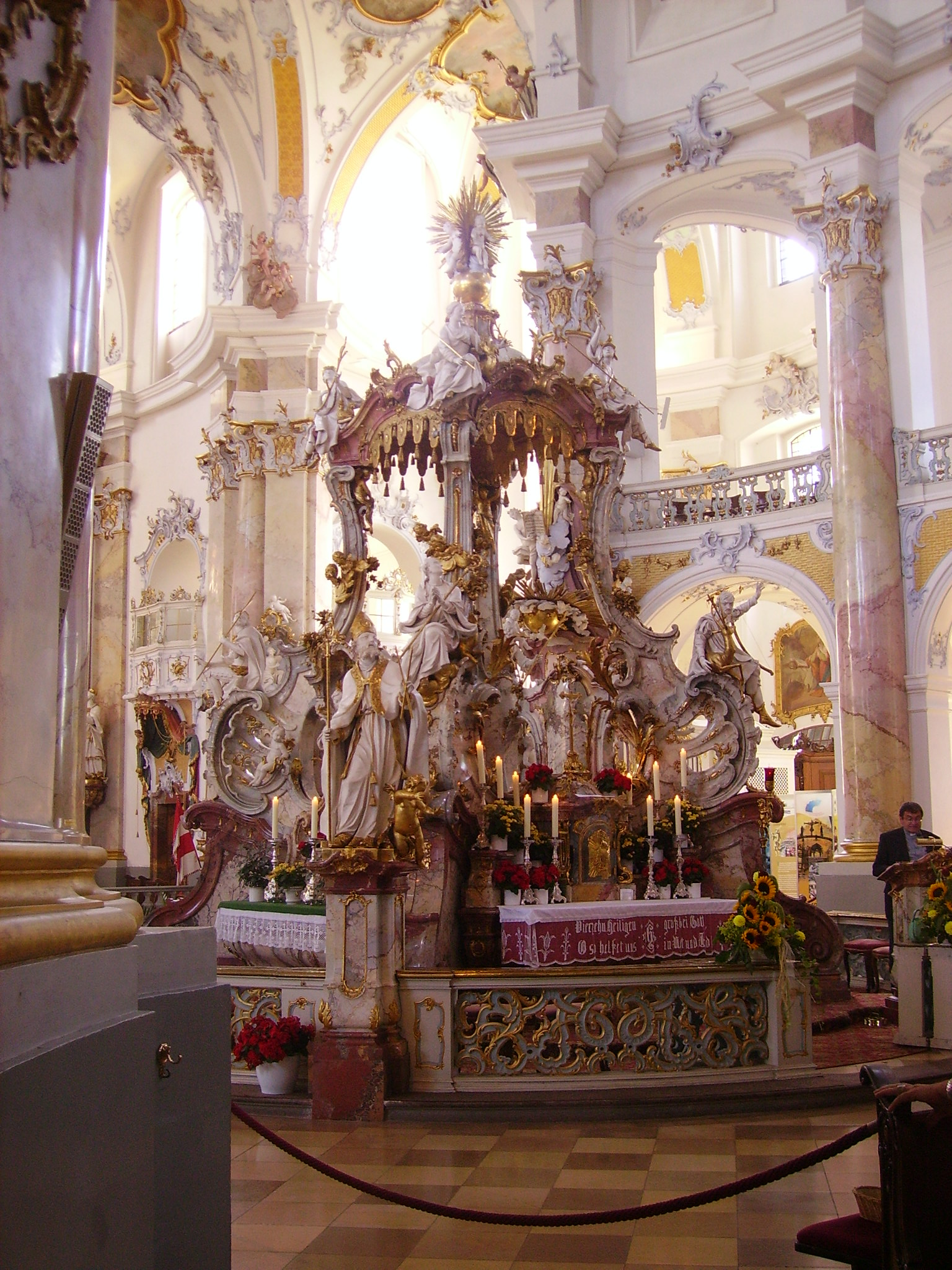
The Mercy Altar (Gnadenaltar)

- On the balustrade:
  - Blaise (also Blase and Blasius) (February 3), bishop and martyr, invoked against illness of the throat
  - Cyriacus (Cyriac) (August 8), deacon and martyr, invoked against temptation on the death-bed
  - Denis (Dionysius) (October 9), bishop and martyr, invoked against headache
  - Erasmus (Elmo) (June 2), bishop and martyr, invoked against intestinal ailments
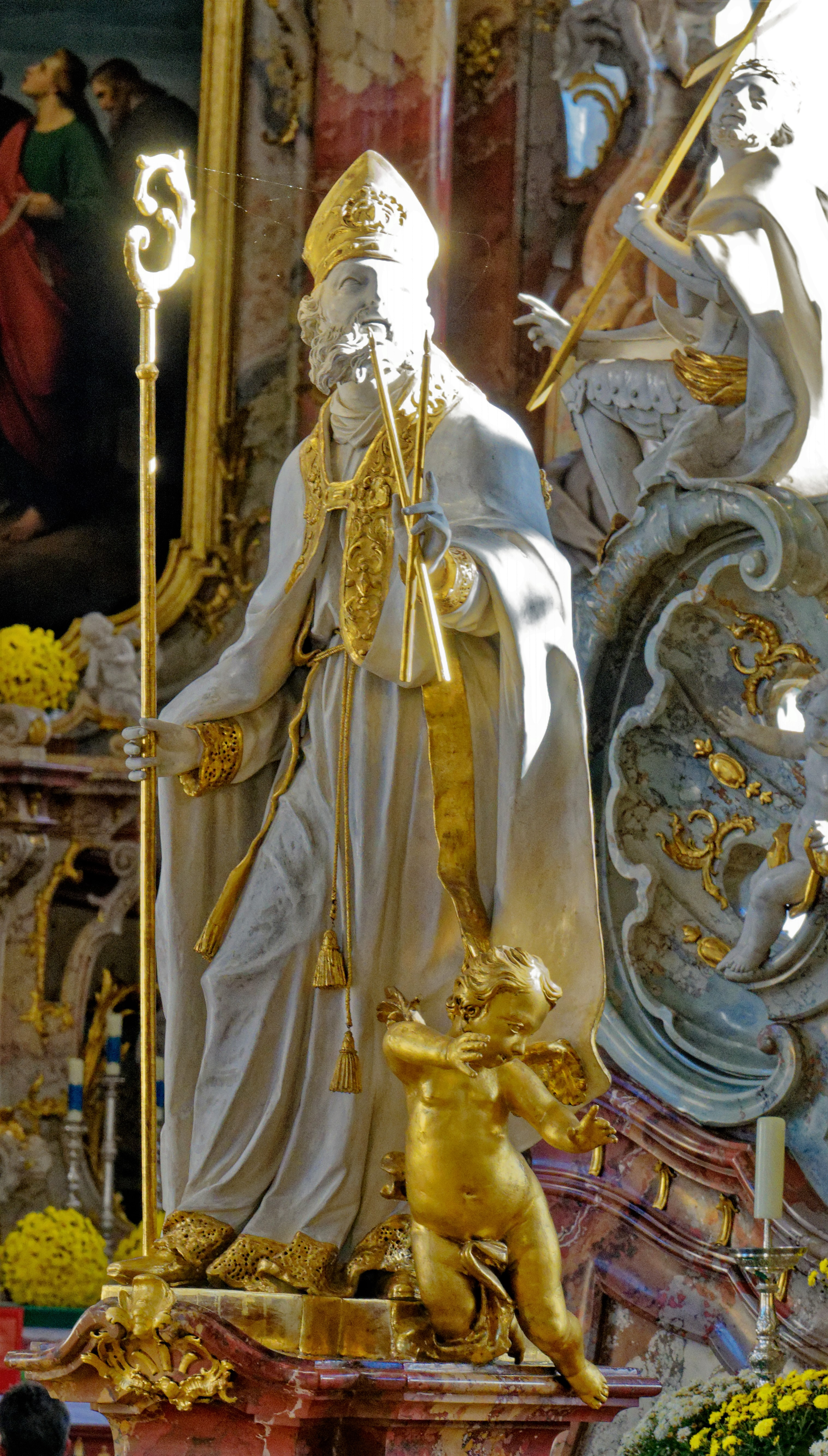
St Blaise with a mitre and crozier, holding crossed candles

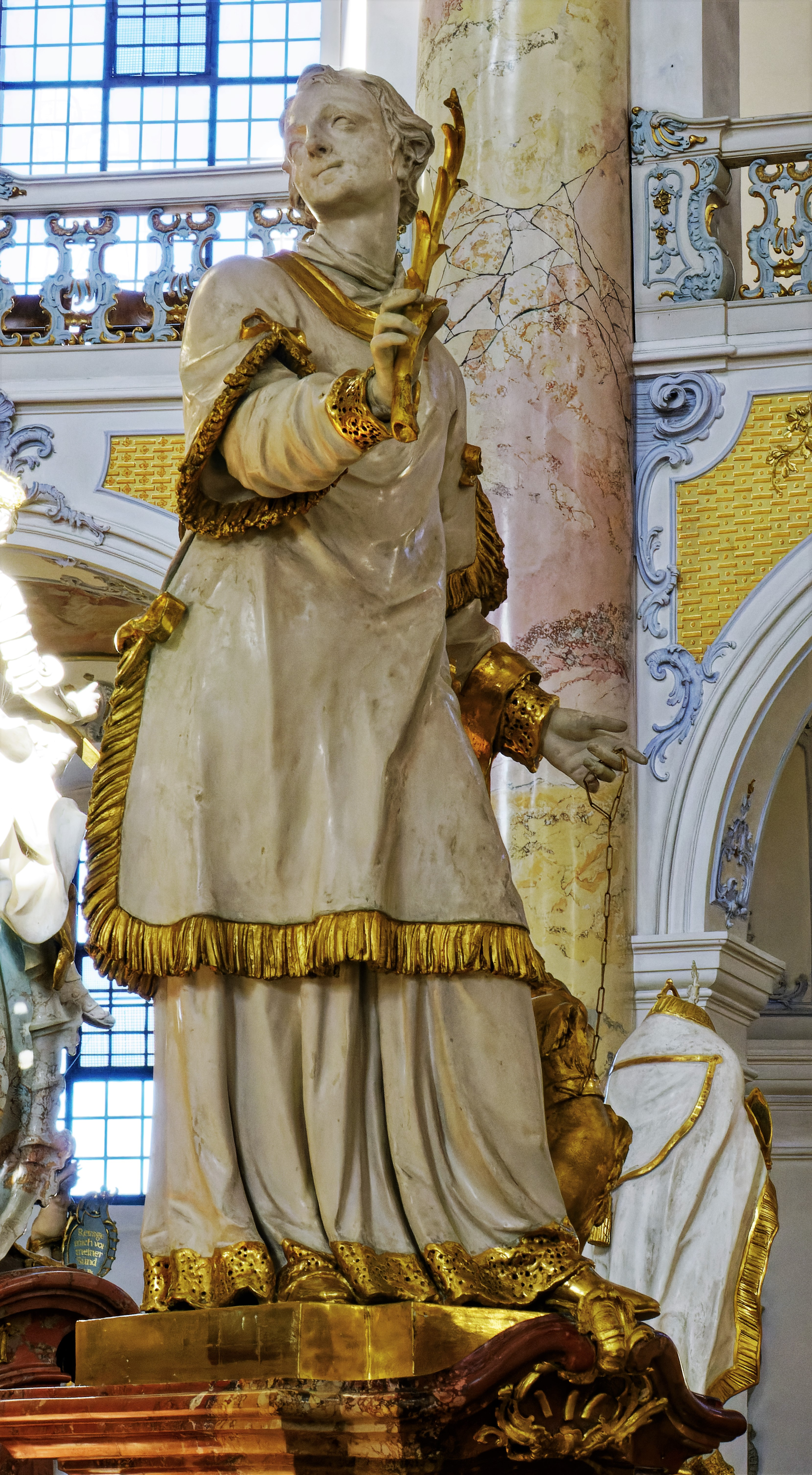
St Cyriacus holding the palm of martyrdom

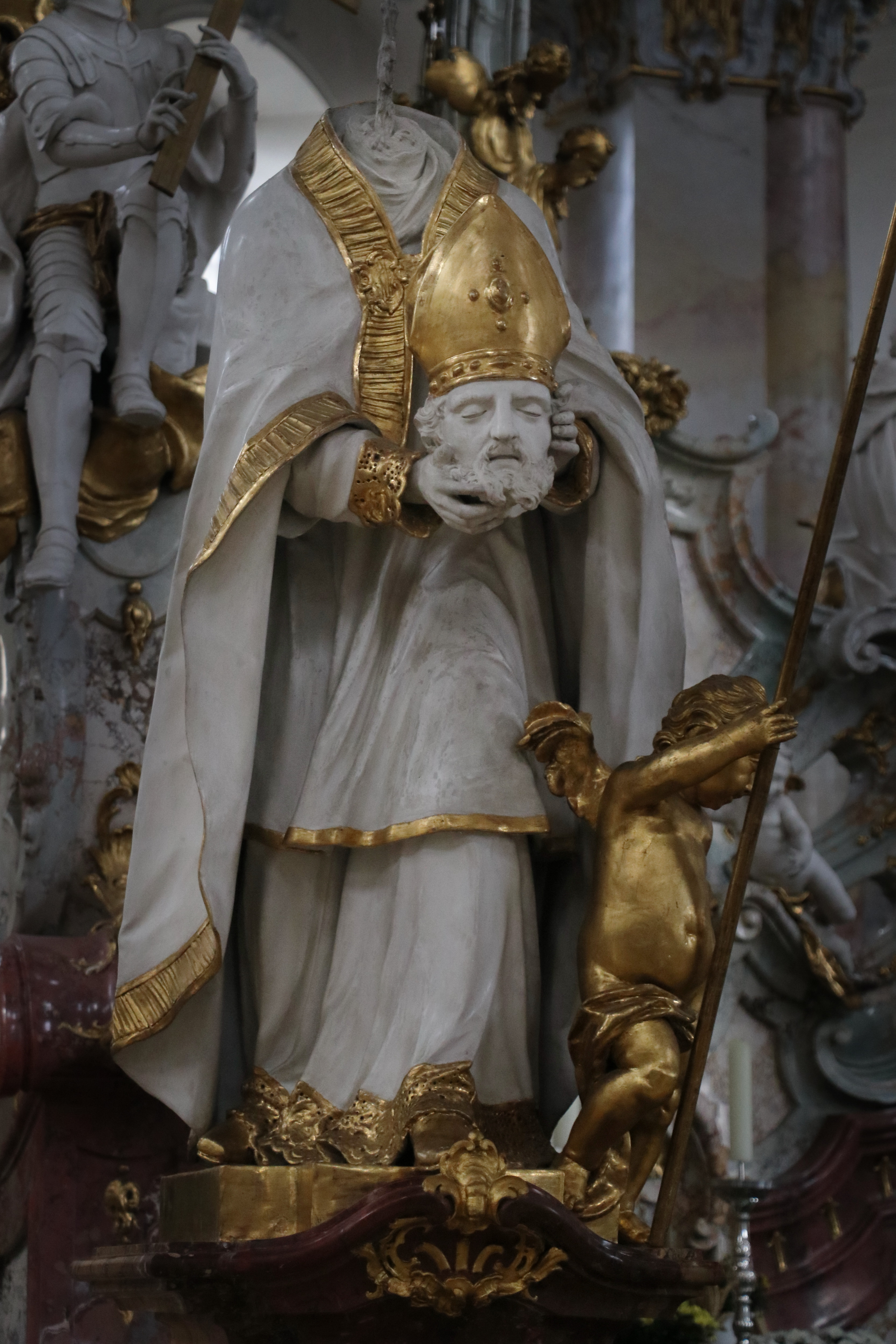
St Denis beheaded

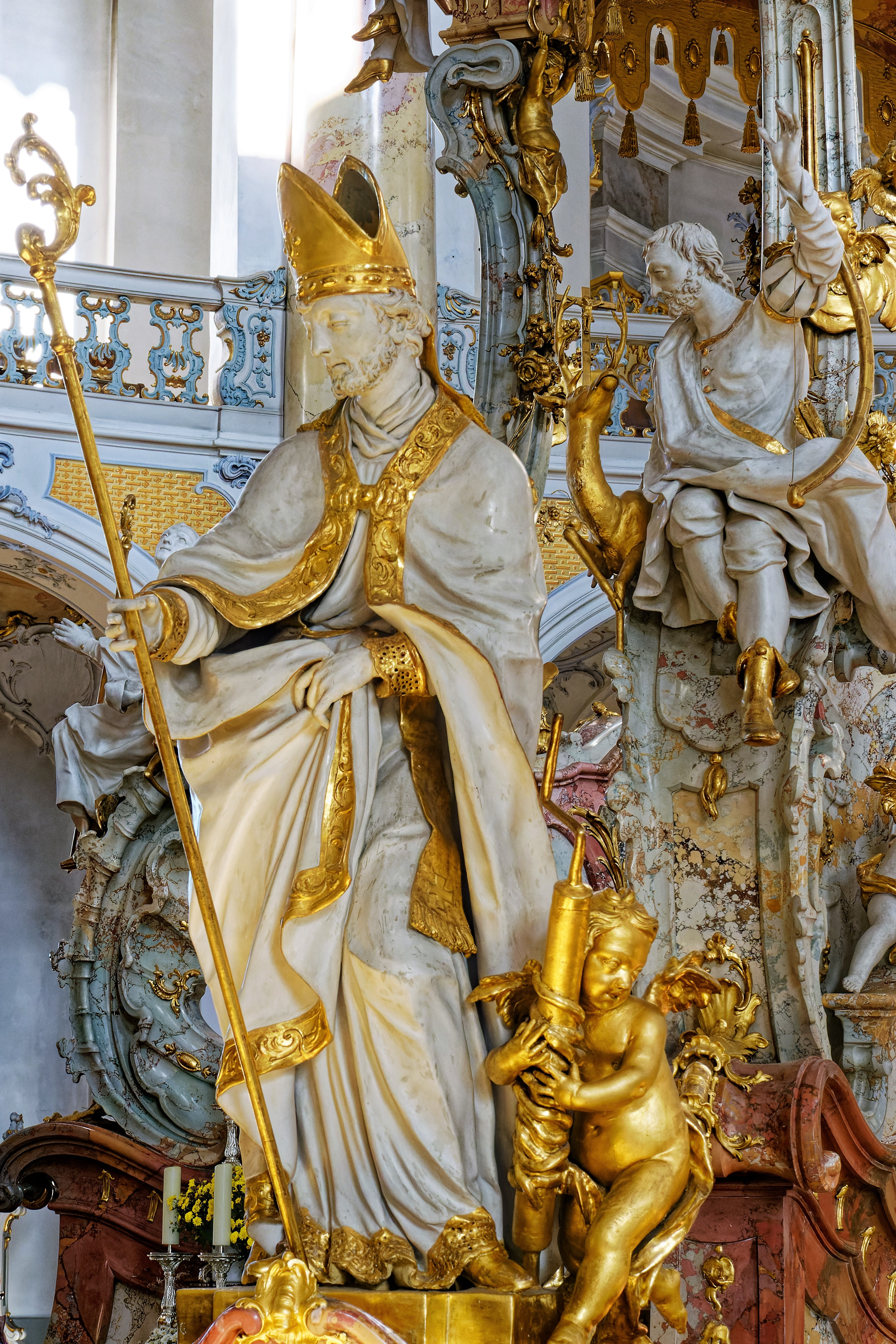
St Erasmus with a mitre and crozier
- In the altar niches:
  - Barbara (December 4), virgin and martyr, invoked against fever and sudden death
  - Catherine of Alexandria (November 25), virgin and martyr, invoked against sudden death
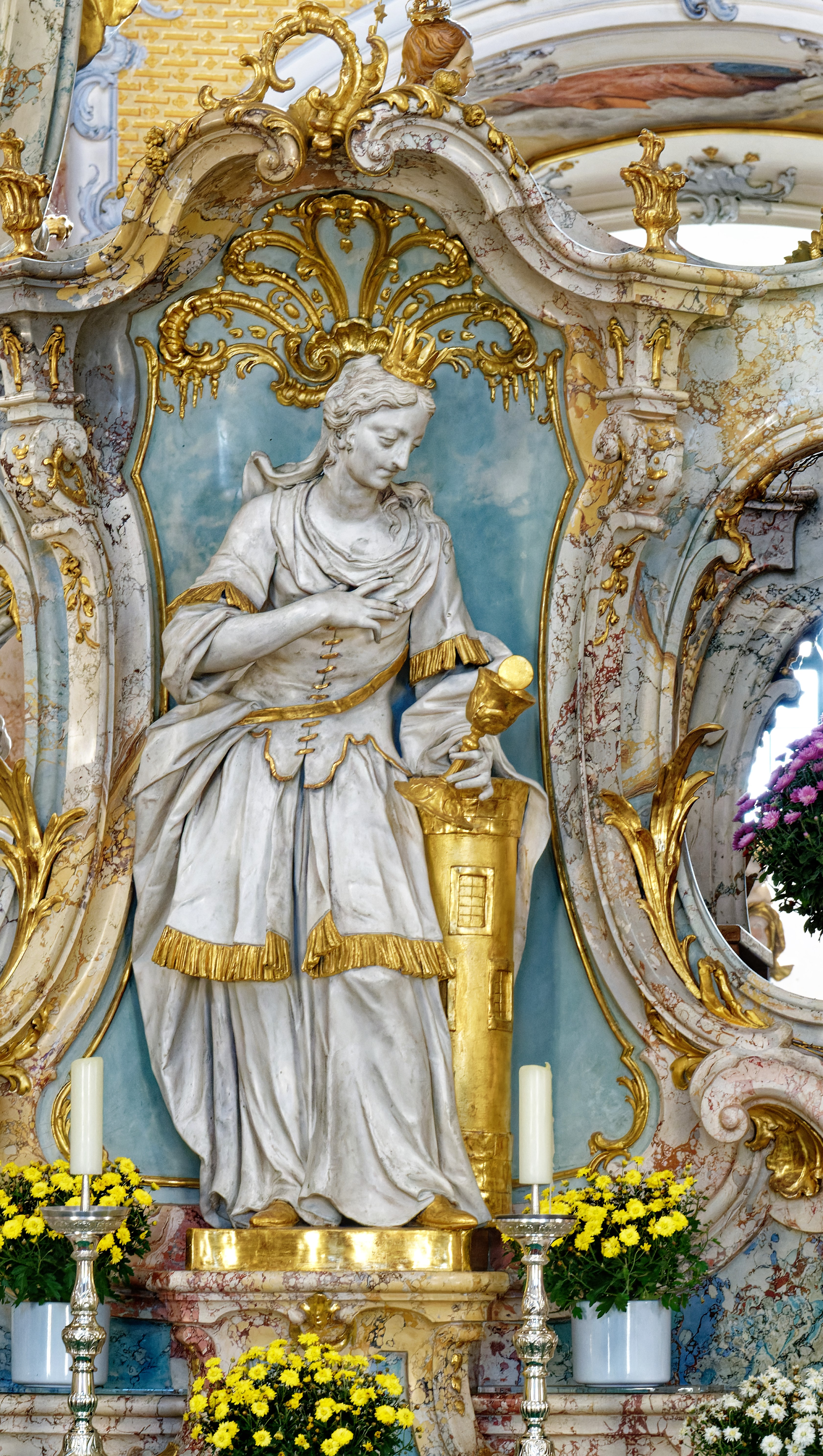
St Barbara holding the Host and Chalice

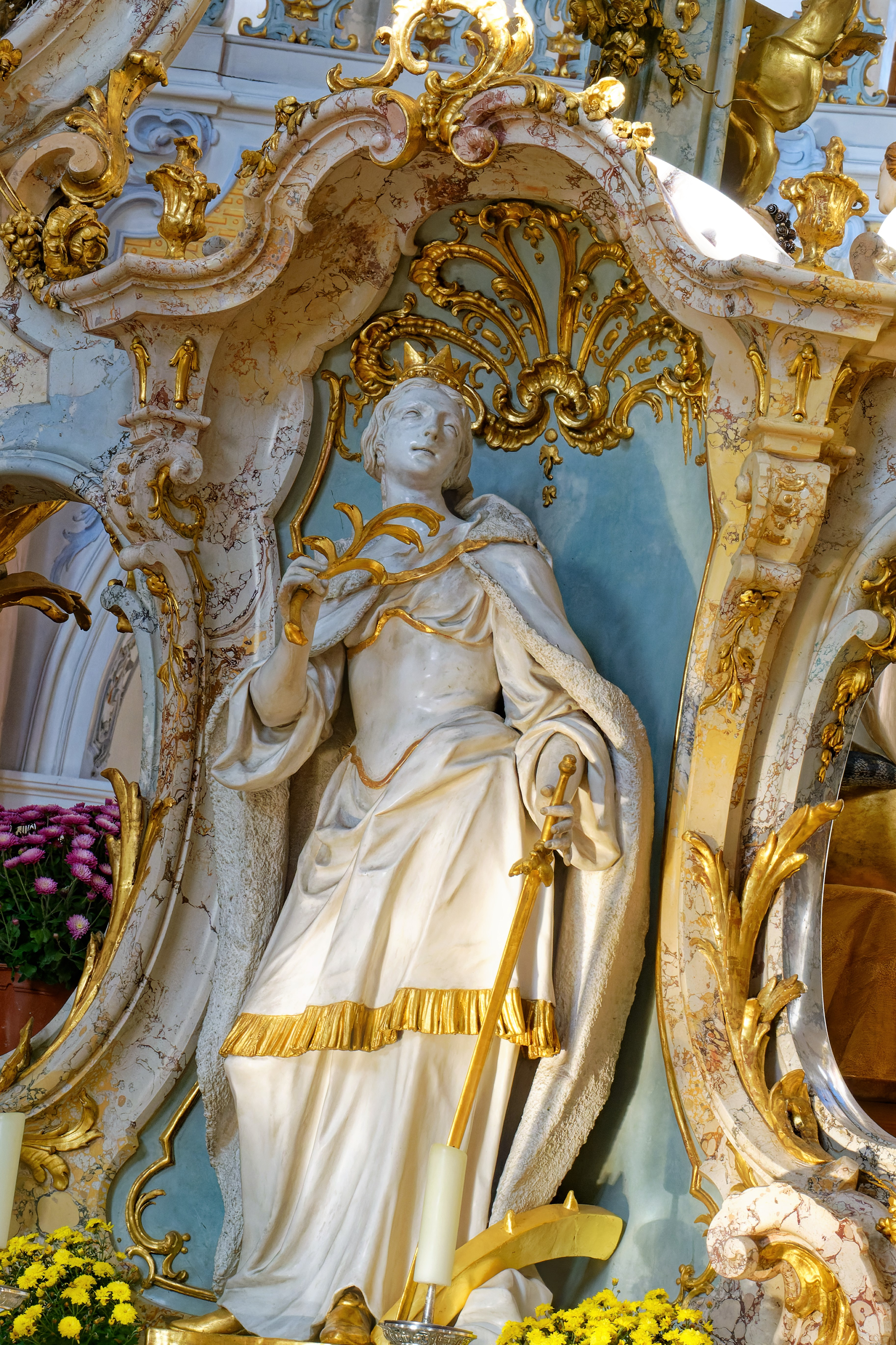
St Catherine holding a sword and the palm of martyrdom
- On the buttresses:
  - Agathius (or Acacius) (May 8), martyr, invoked against headache
  - Christopher (Christophorus) (July 25), martyr, invoked against bubonic plague
  - Eustachius (Eustace, Eustathius) (September 20), martyr, invoked against family discord
  - Giles (Aegidius) (September 1), hermit and abbot, invoked against plague, for a good confession
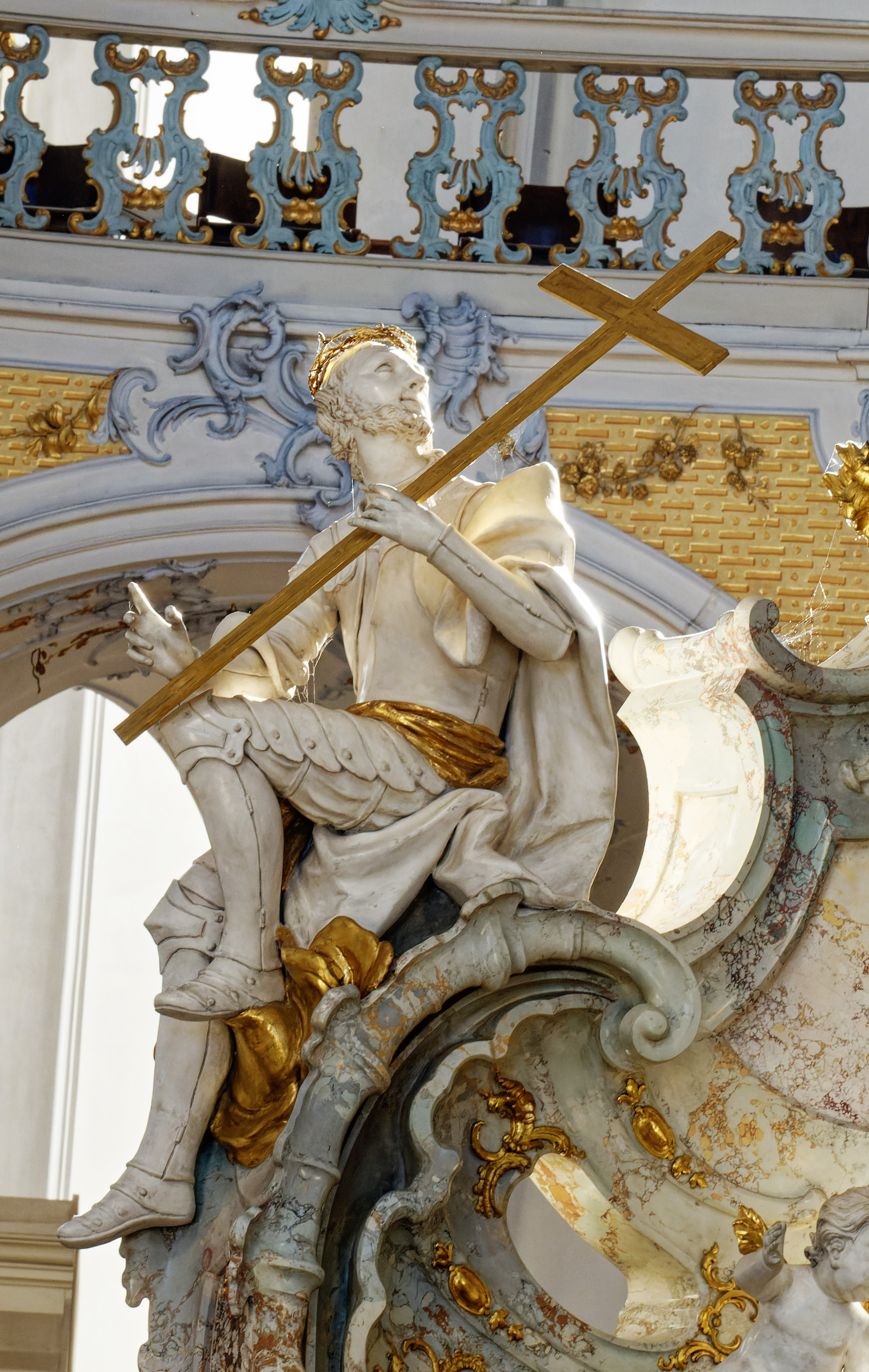
St Agathius in centurion armour holding a cross

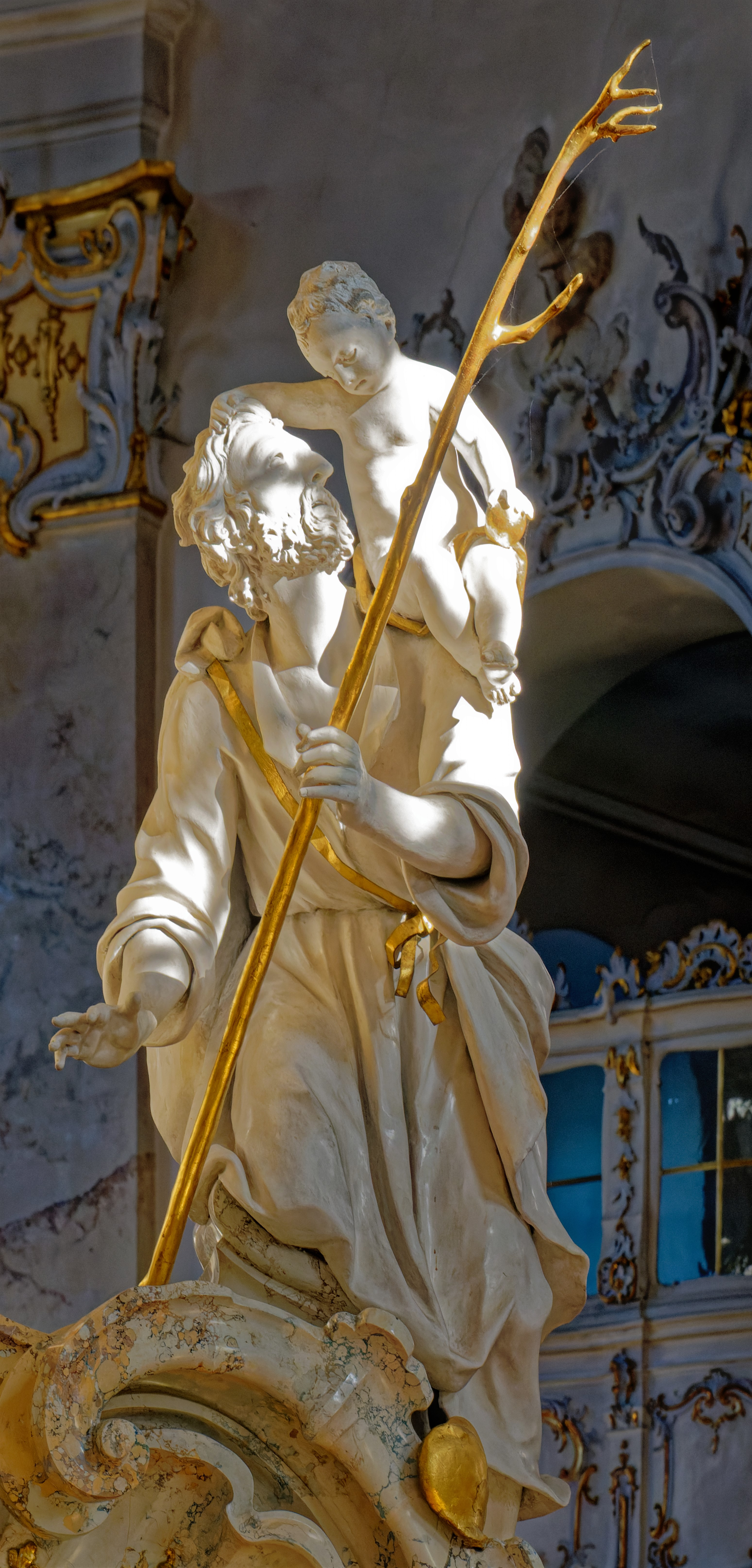
St Christopher carrying a stick and the Christ Child

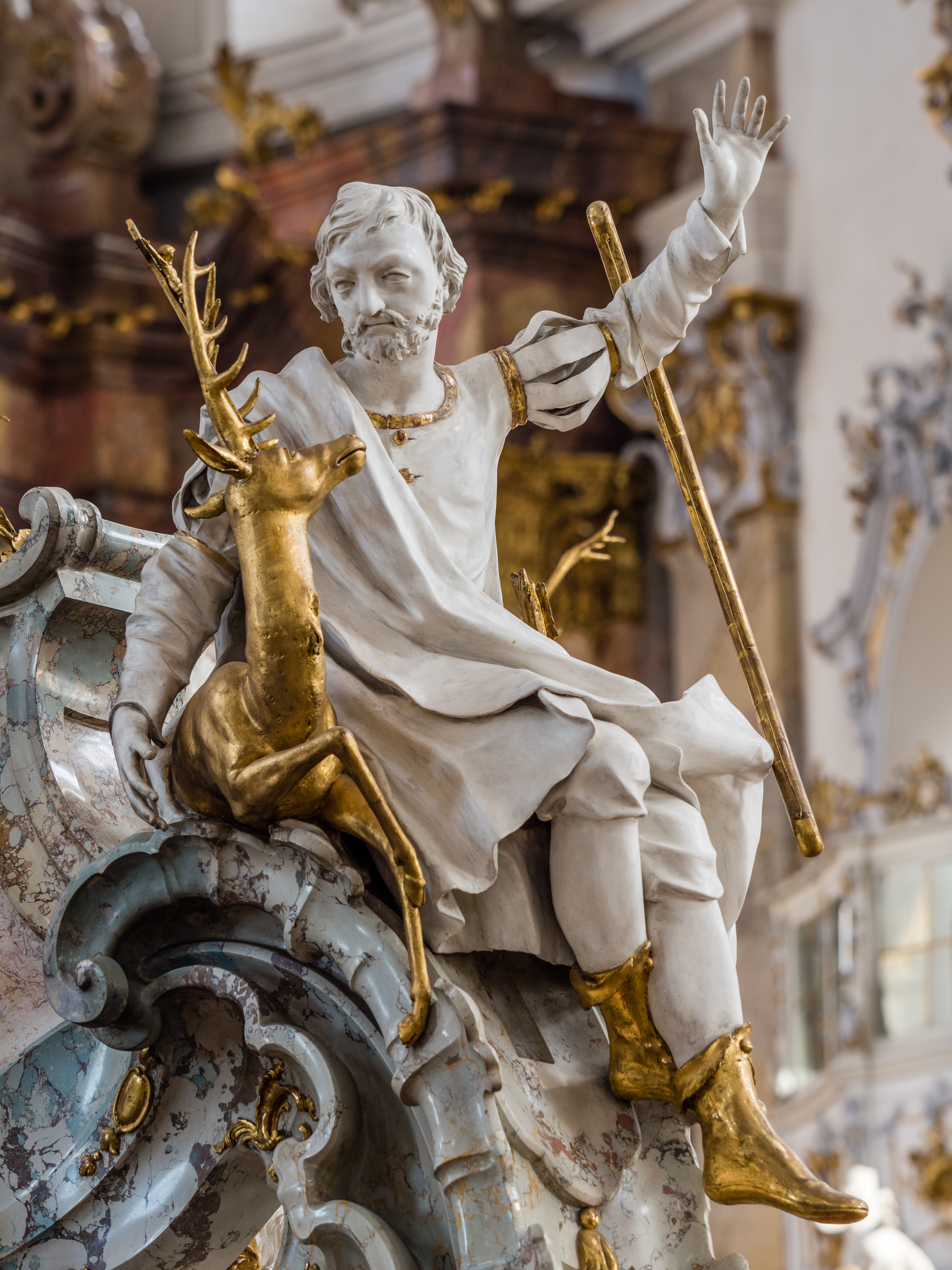
St Eustace holding a stag with a crucifix between its antlers

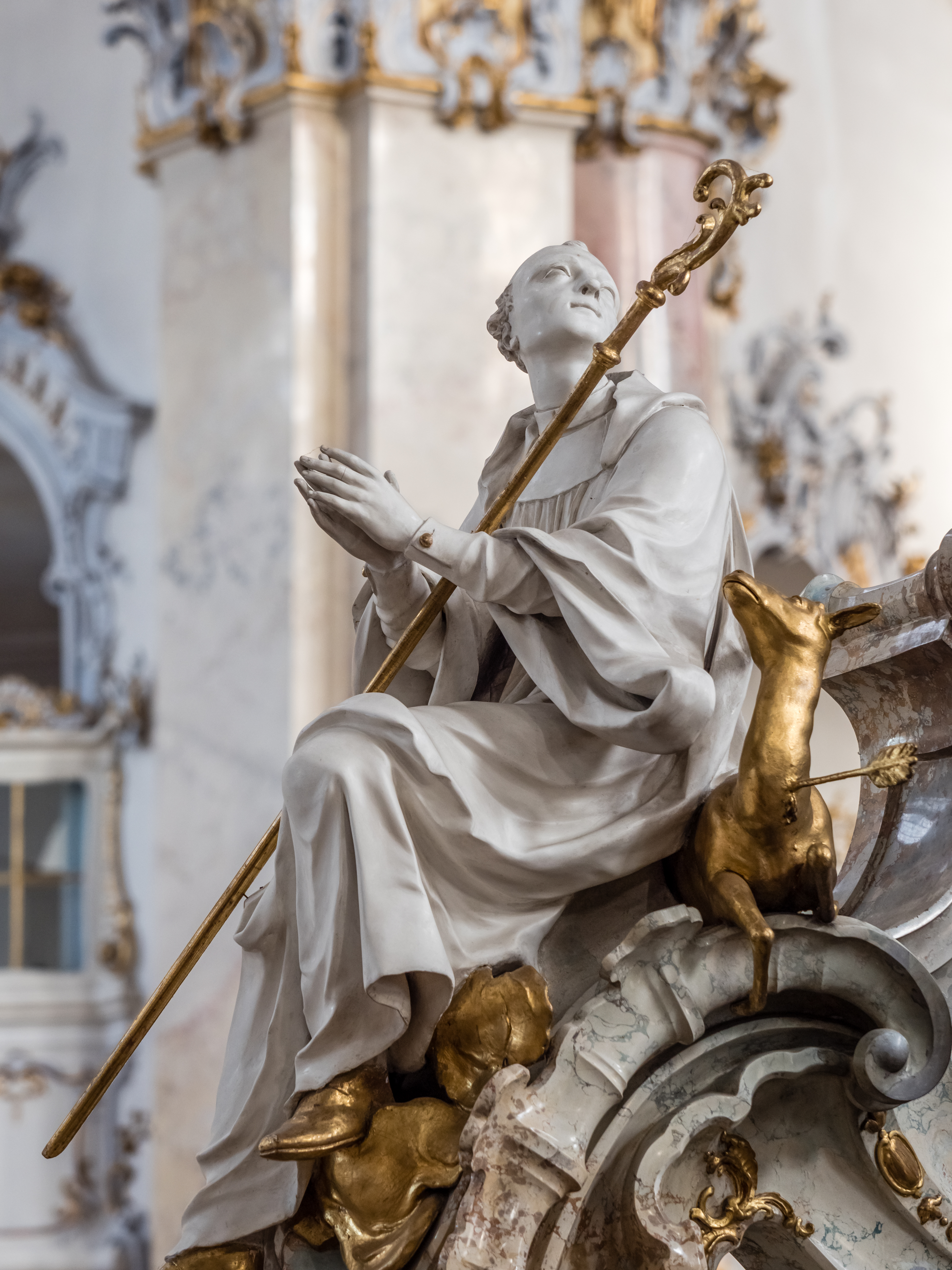
St Giles holding a crozier and comforting his arrow-shot doe
- On top of the baldachin:
  - George (April 23), soldier-martyr, for the health of domestic animals
  - Margaret of Antioch (July 20), virgin and martyr, invoked in childbirth
  - Pantaleon (July 27), bishop and martyr, for physicians
  - Vitus (June 15), martyr, invoked against epilepsy
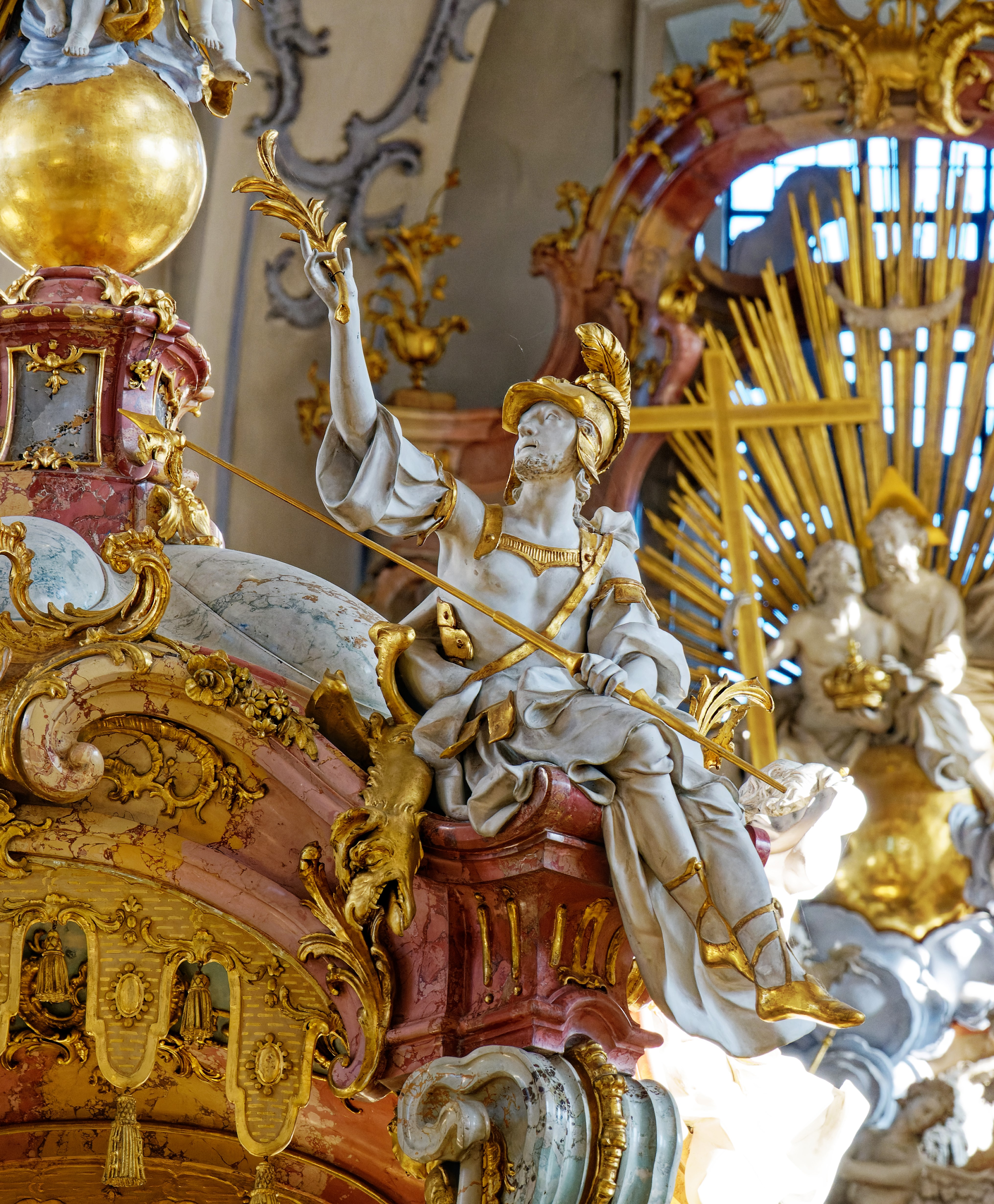
St George dressed in crusader plate armour and holding a lance

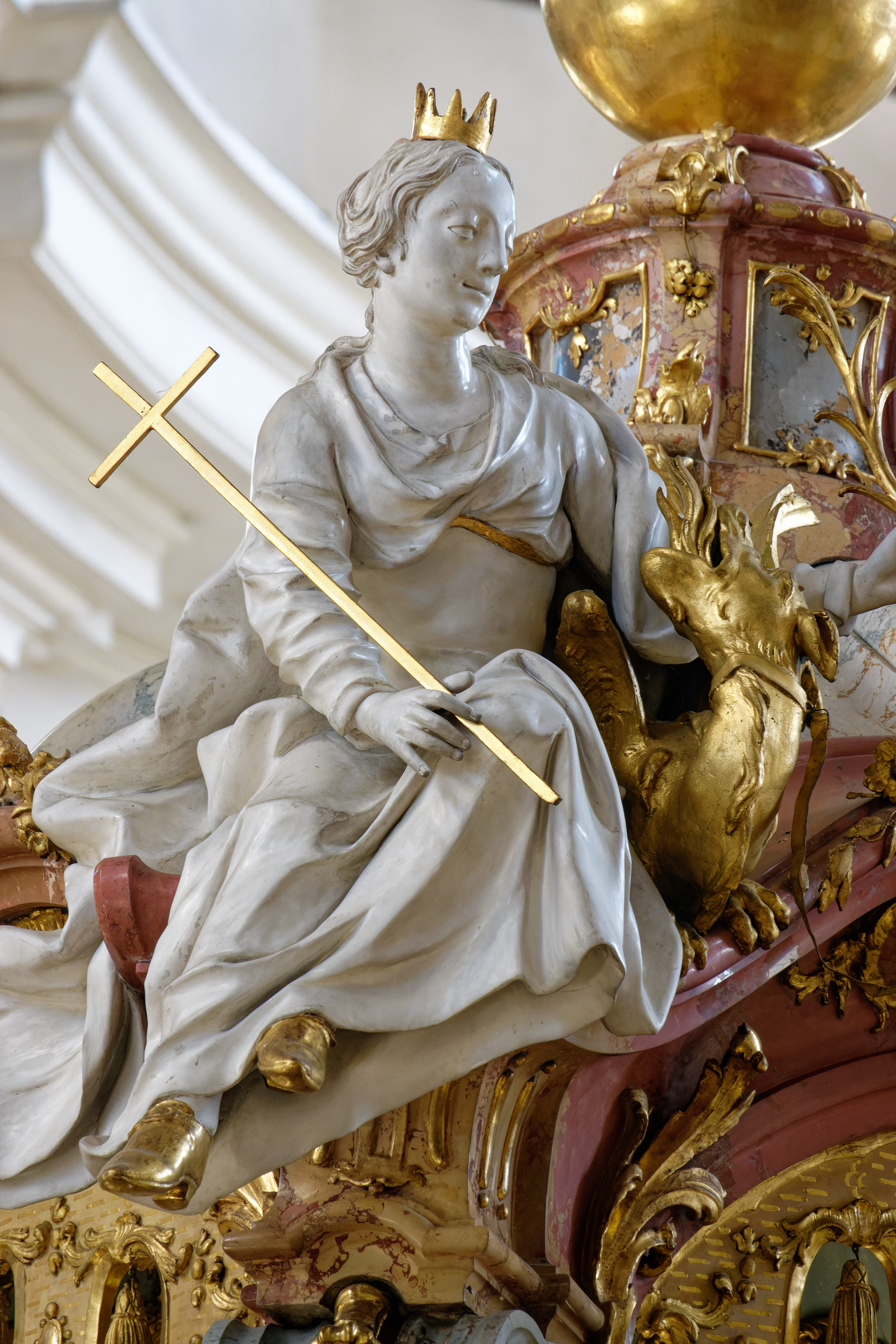
St Margaret wearing a crown and holding a cross and dragon

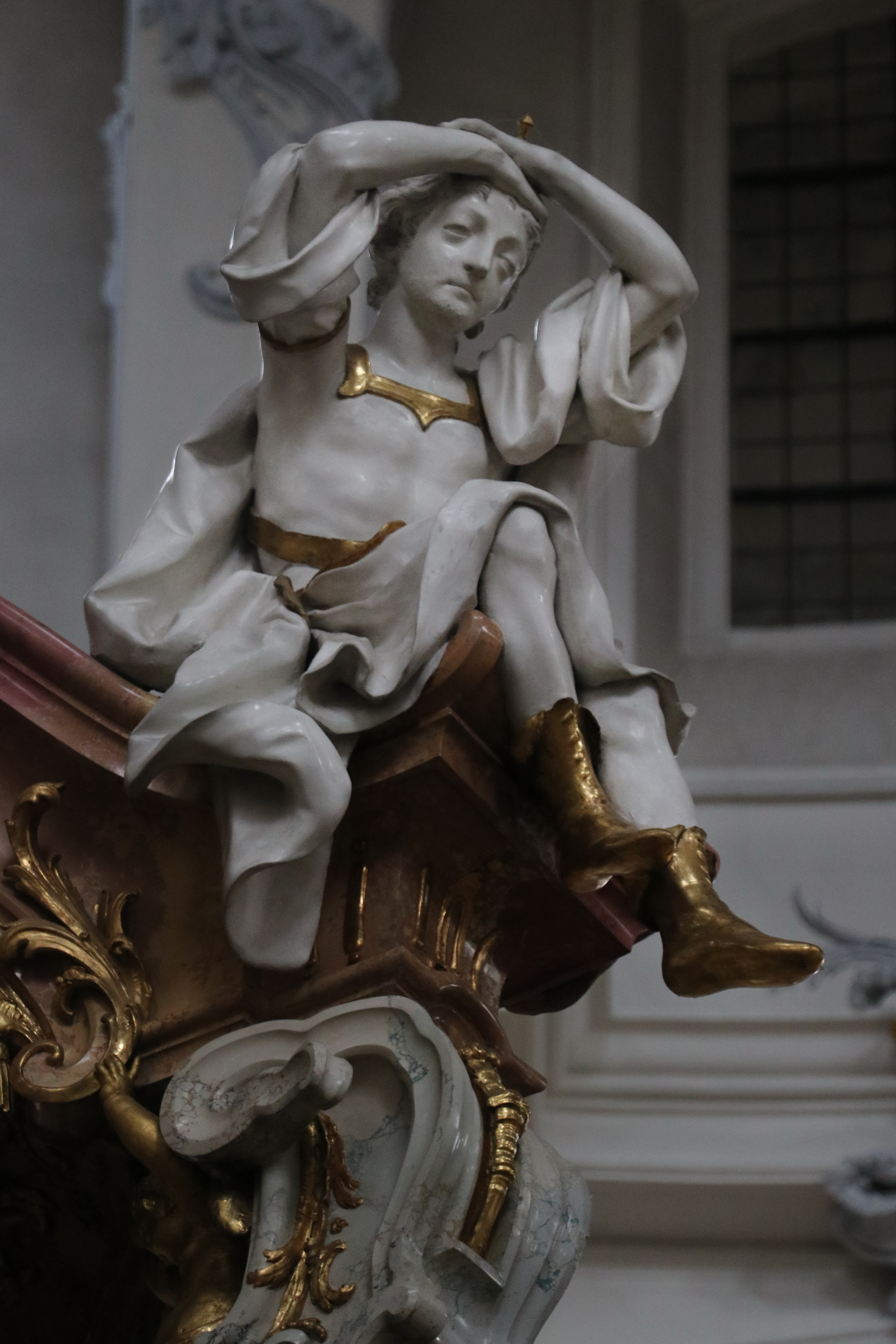
St Pantaleon

== The High Altar of Vierzehnheiligen ==
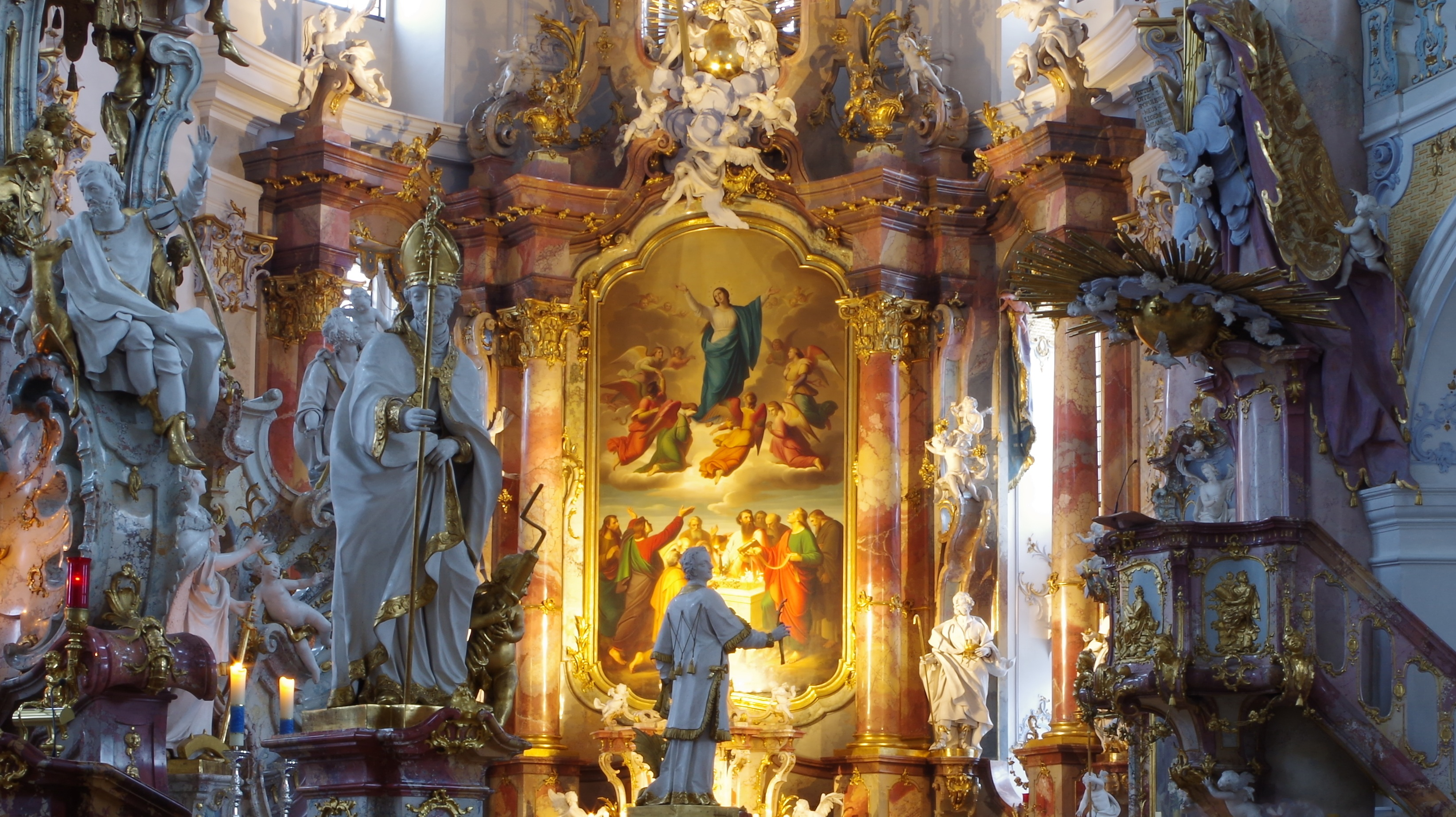
Illuminated high altar.

The central scene of the unobstructed and towering high altar is a larger-than-life painting showing the Assumption of the Blessed Virgin Mary. The statues depict her spouse Joseph, her father Joachim, and David and Zachariah.

== Pulpit ==
Free-floating white putti bear the pulpit, ornamented with the golden reliefs of the Evangelists which are surrounded by shellwork. The pulpit tester (sound board) is made of rays in a spherical shape.

== Gallery ==
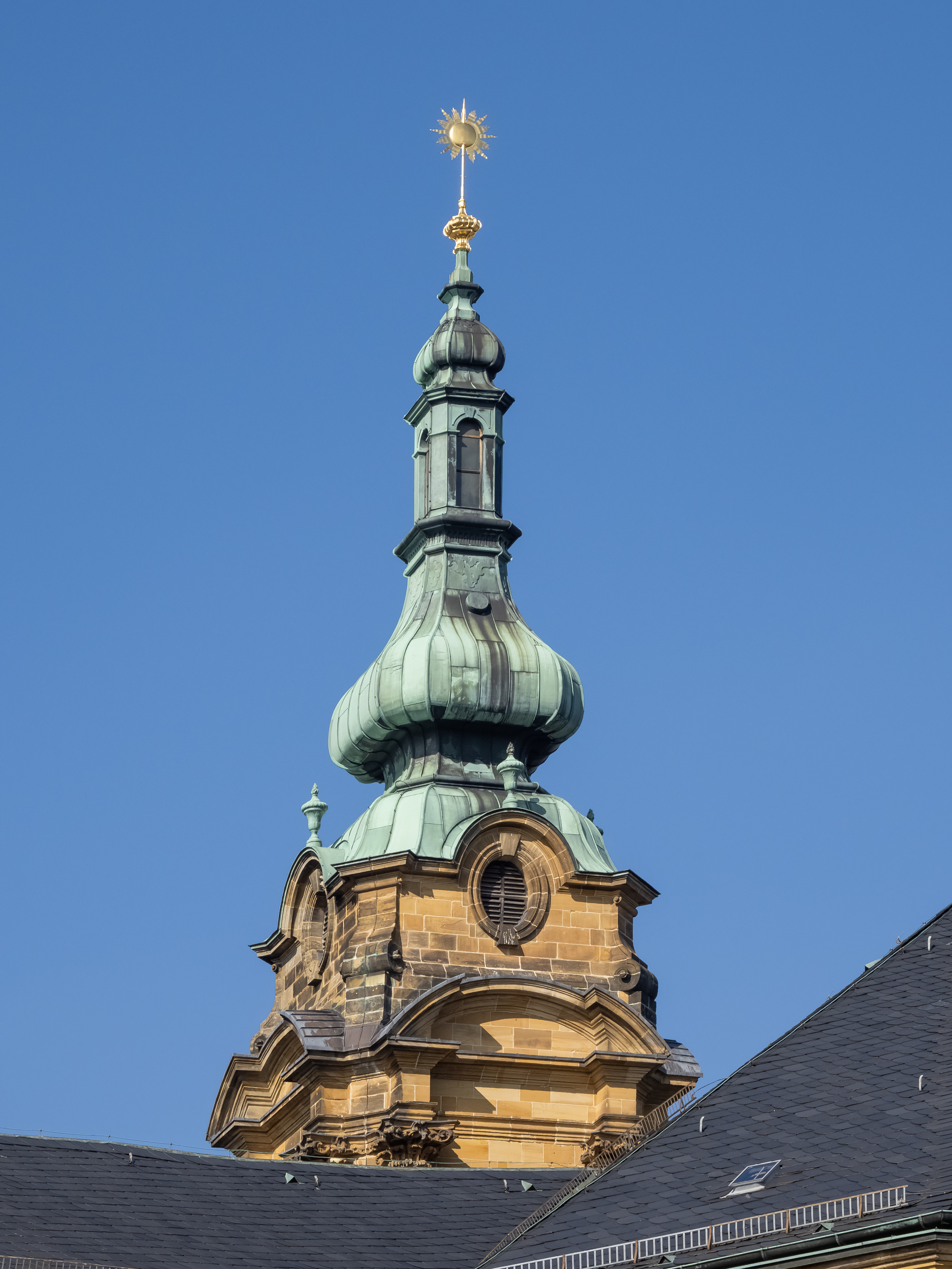
Northern tower of the Basilica

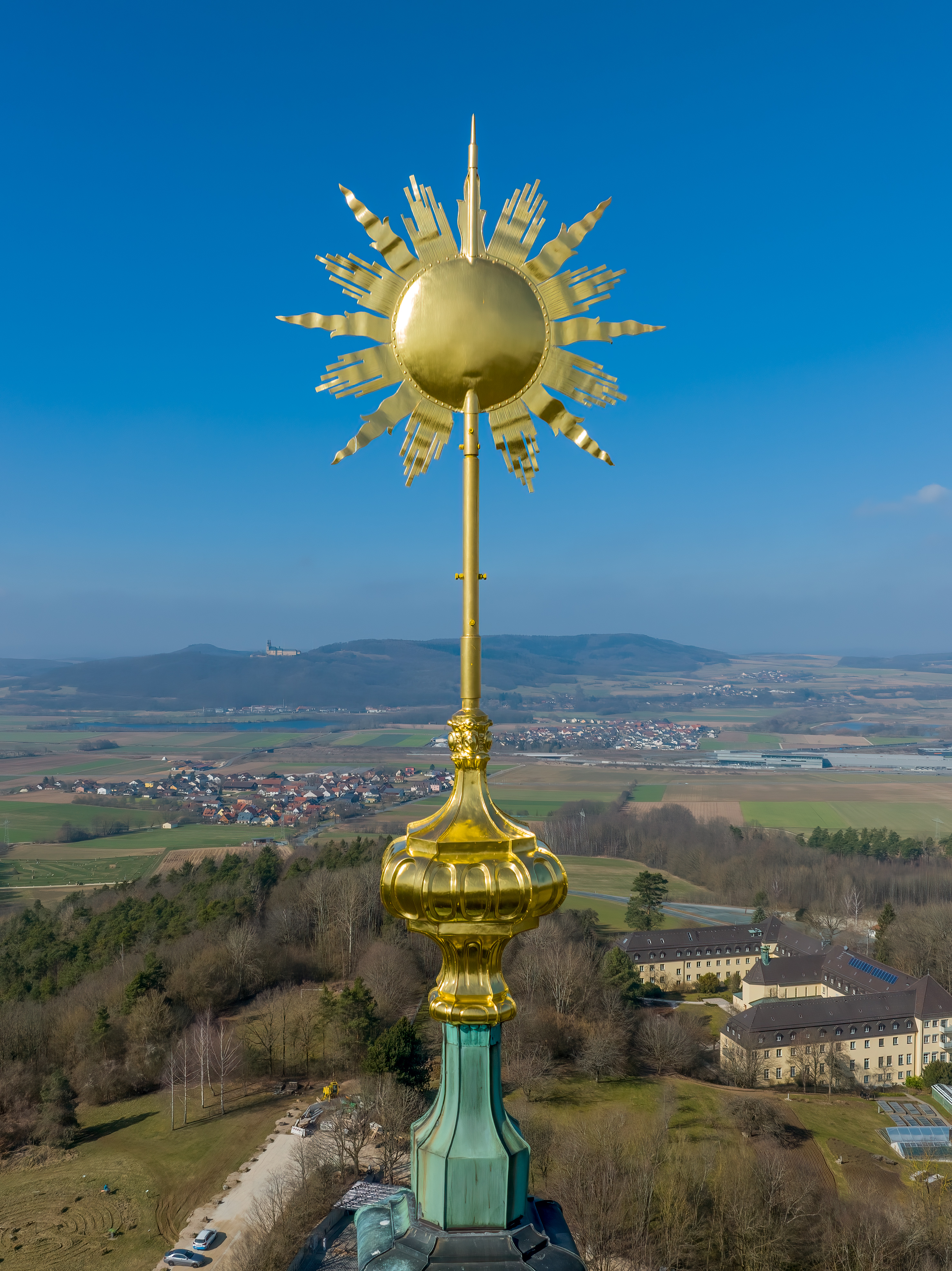
Close up of spire from the northern tower

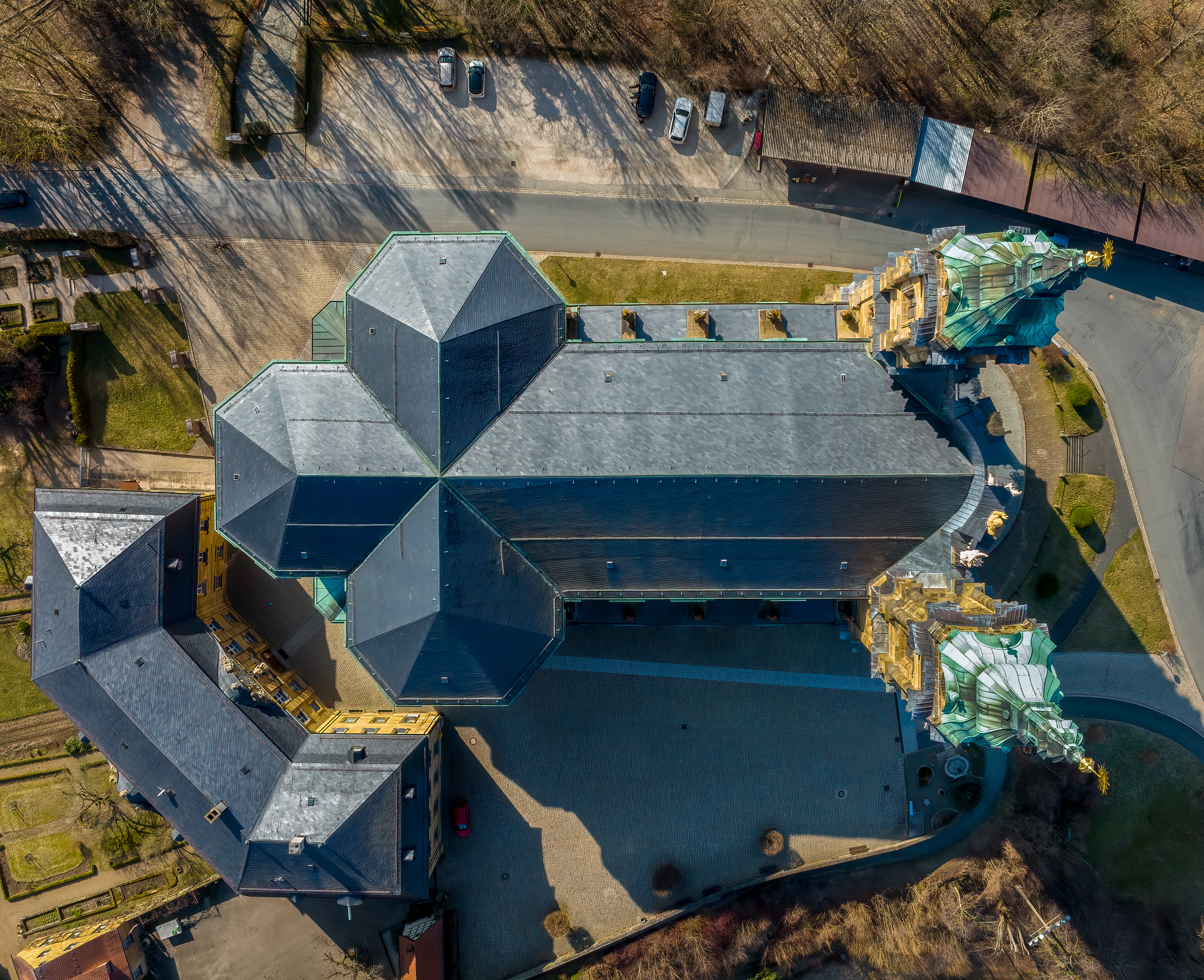
Overhead view of the Basilica

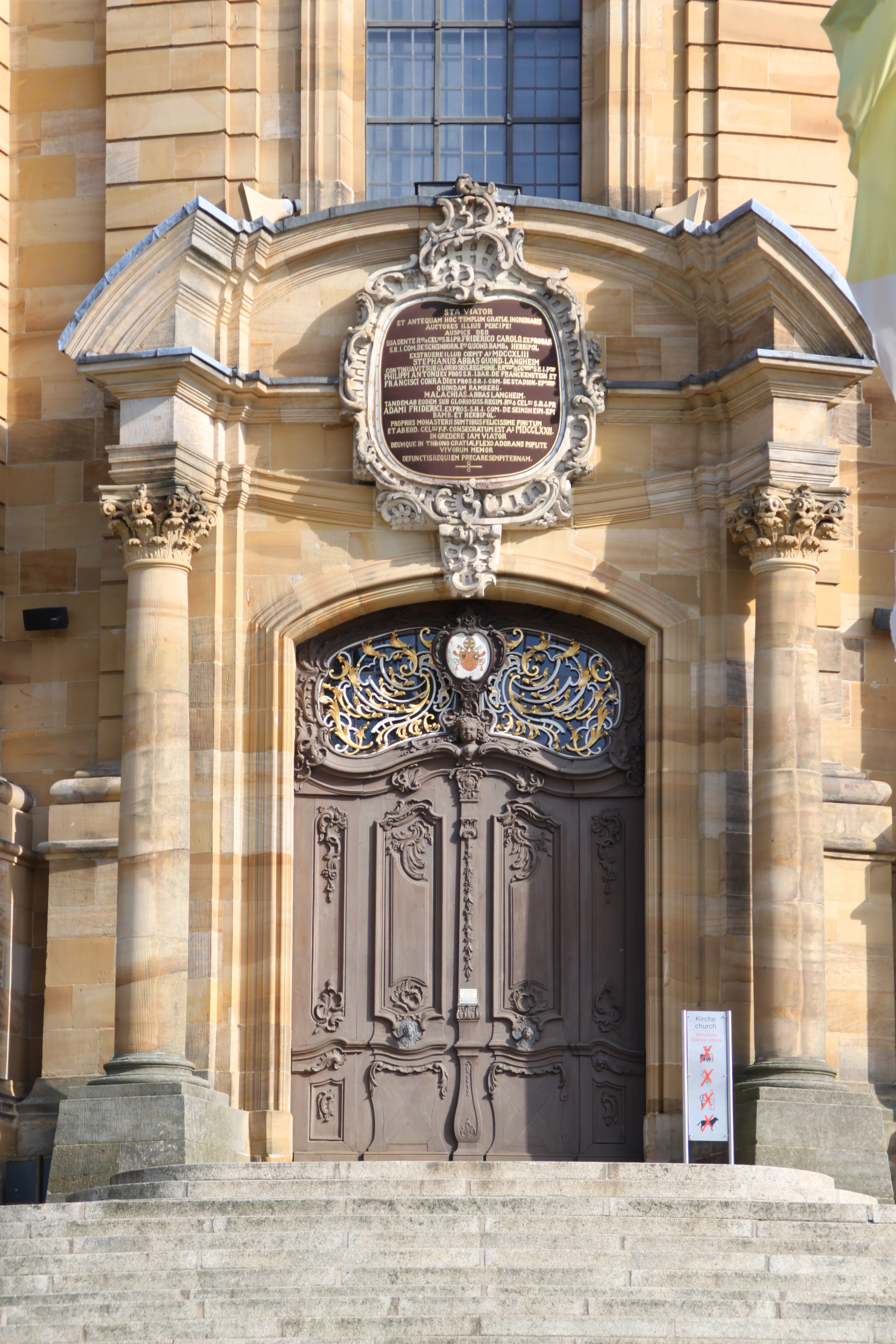
Main entrance

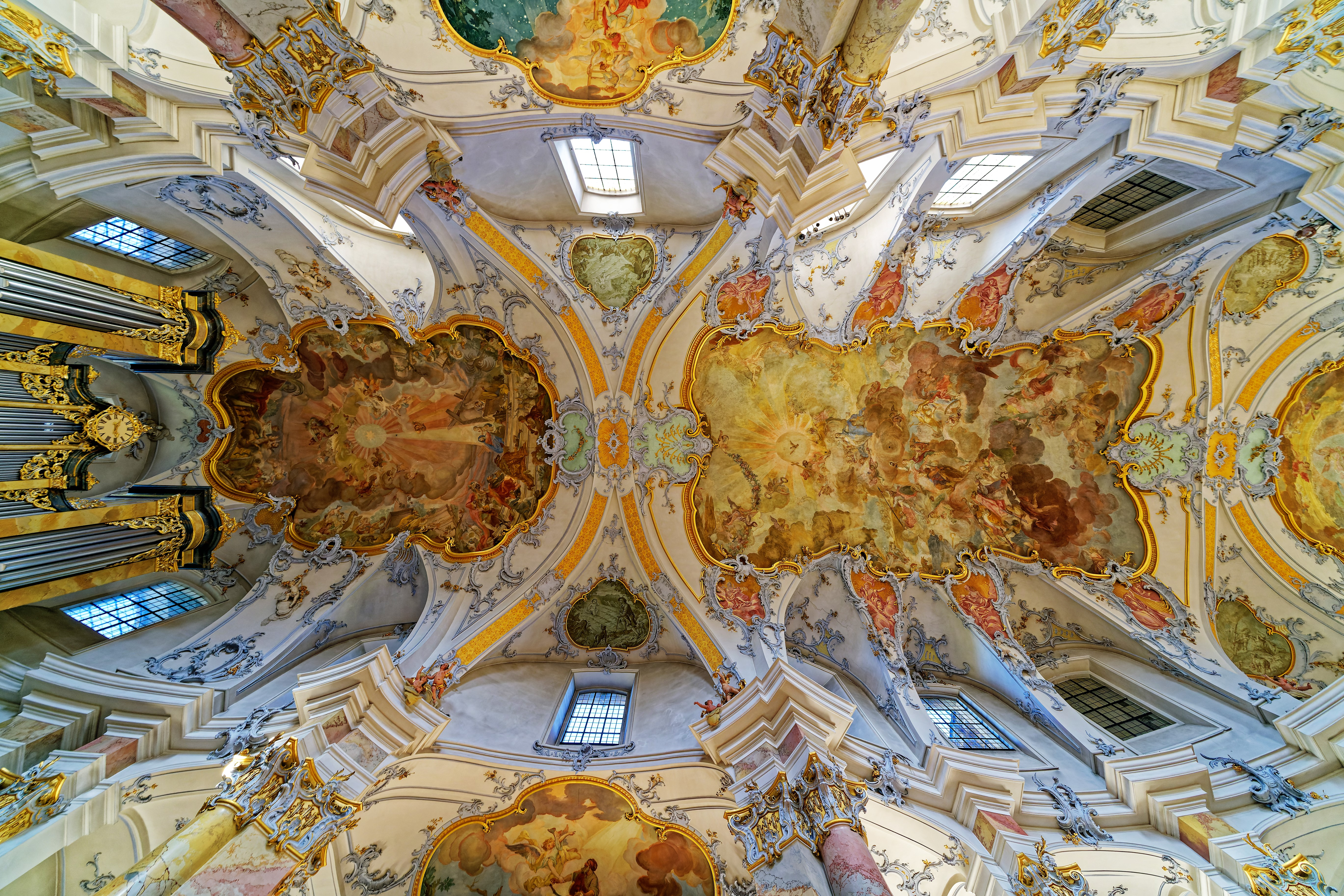
Ceiling of interior

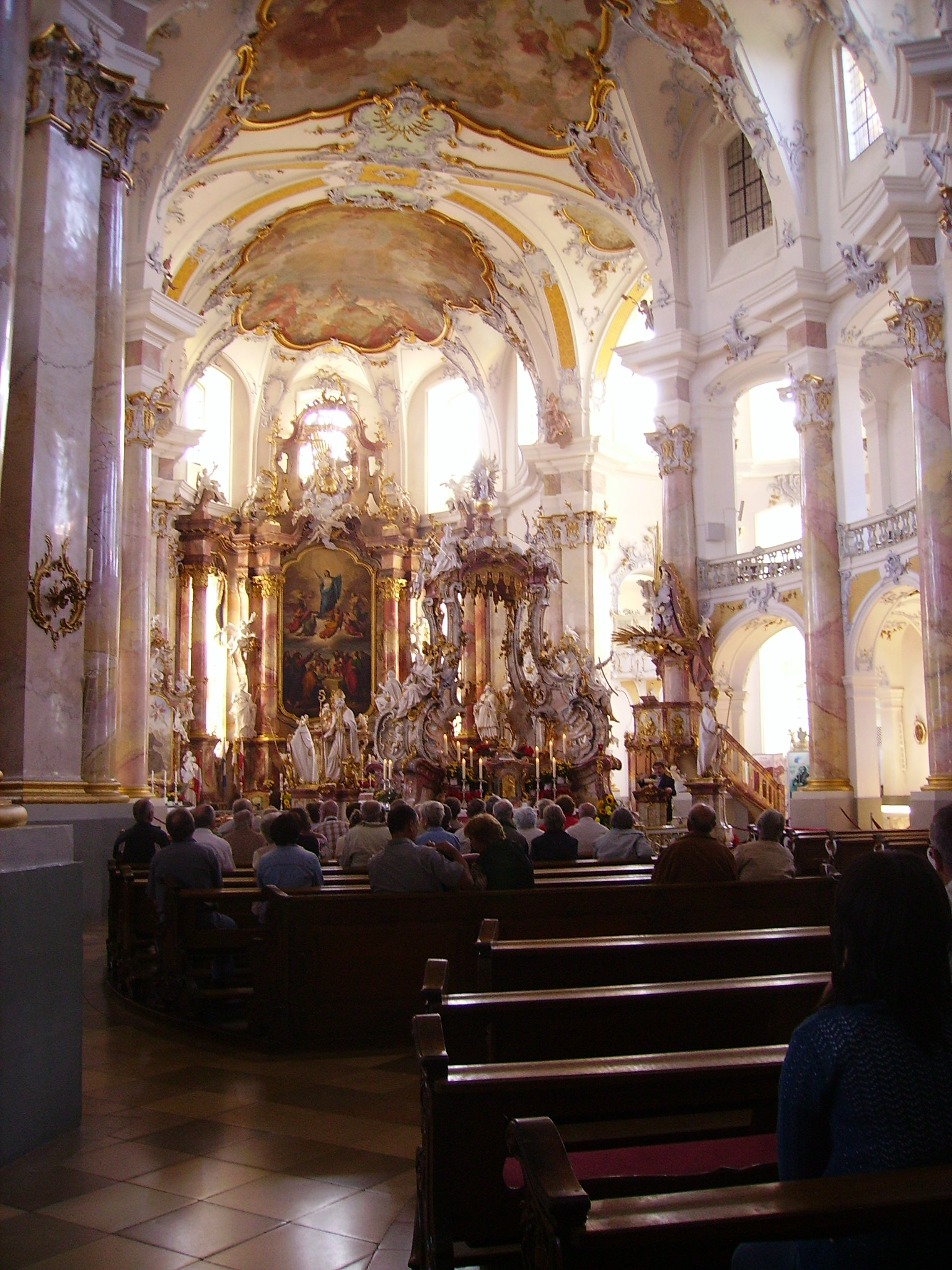
Nave of the Basilica

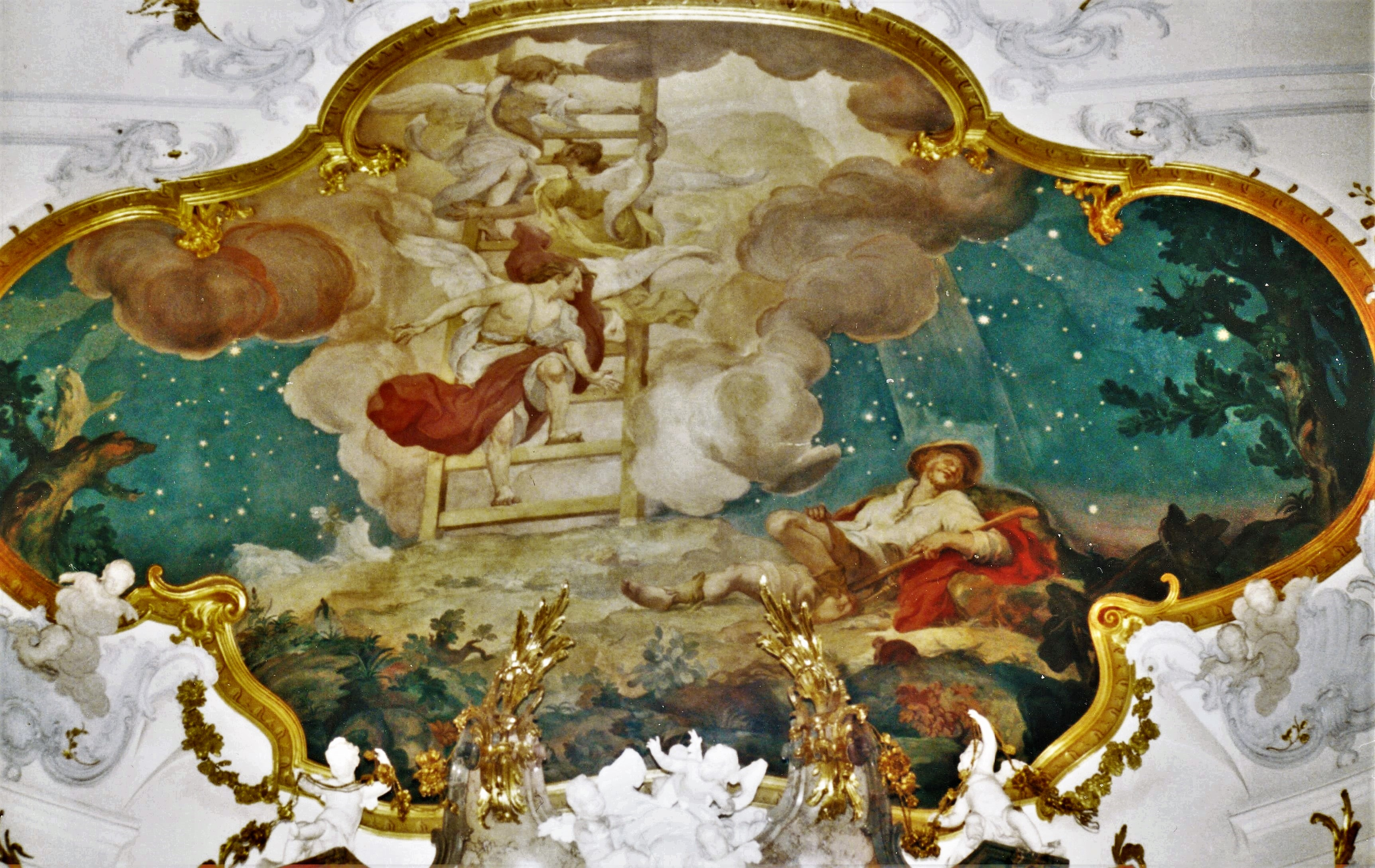
Fresco adorning the ceiling above High Altar

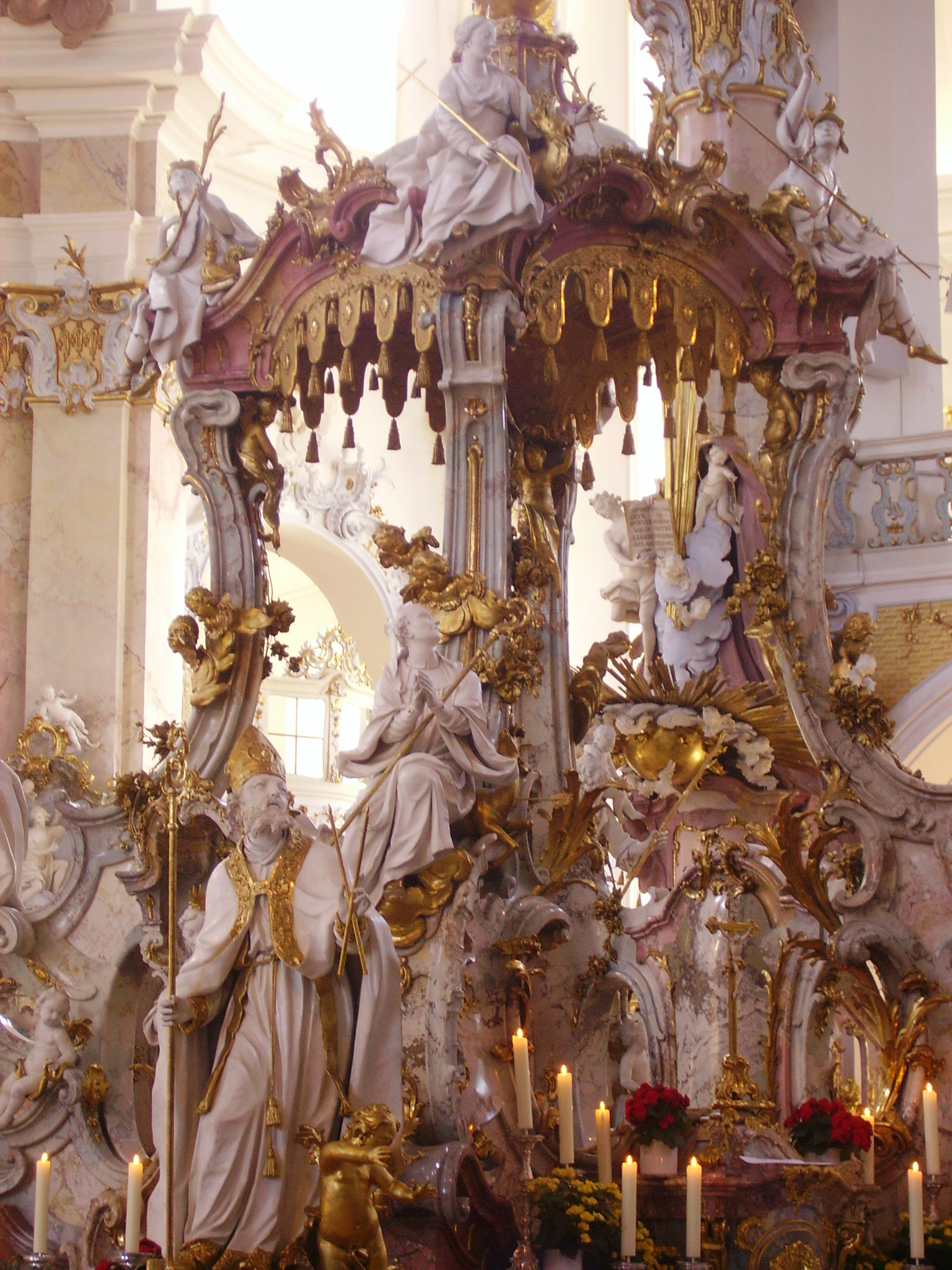
Closeup of the Mercy Altar

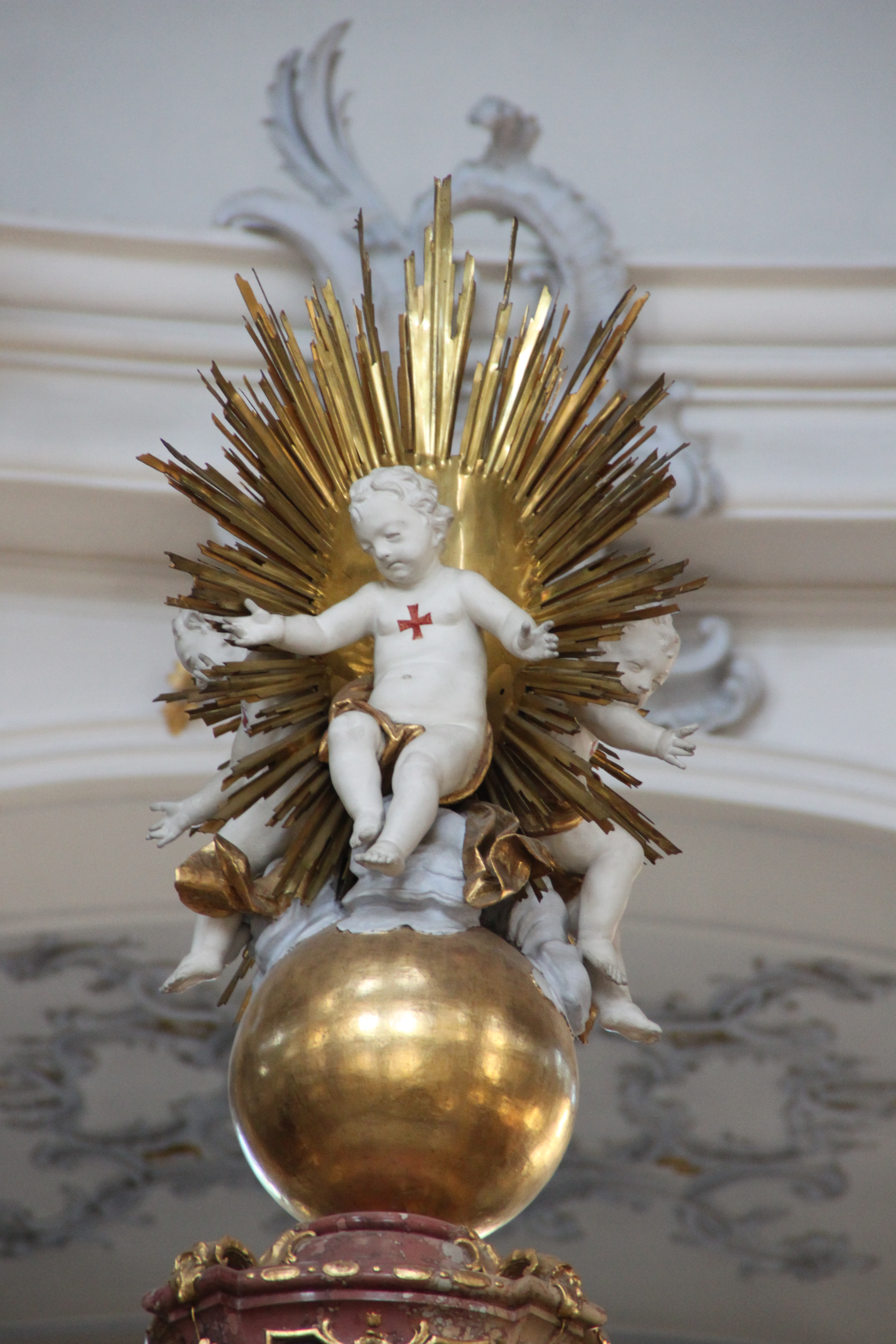
Statue of the Child from the apparitions

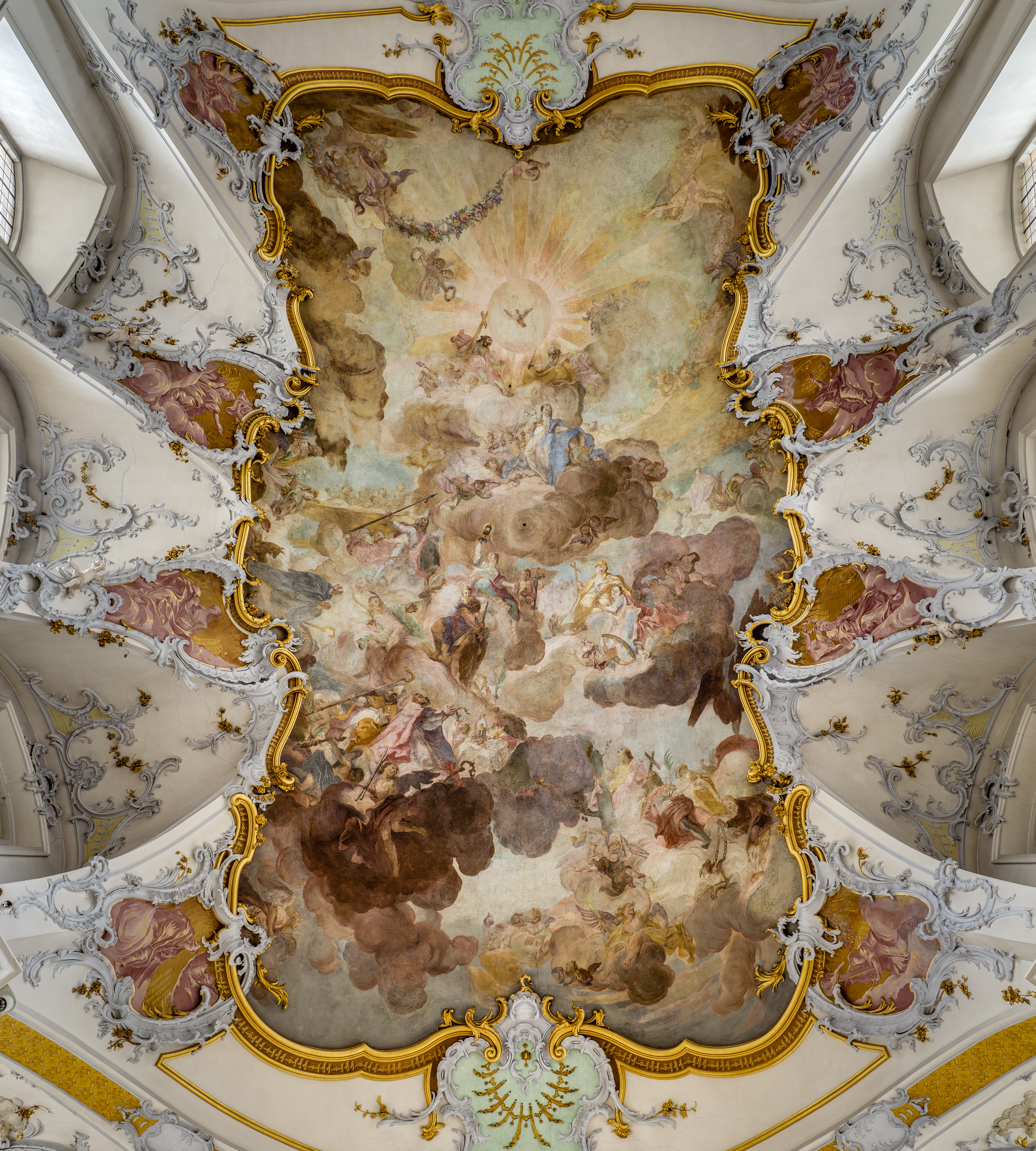
Main fresco

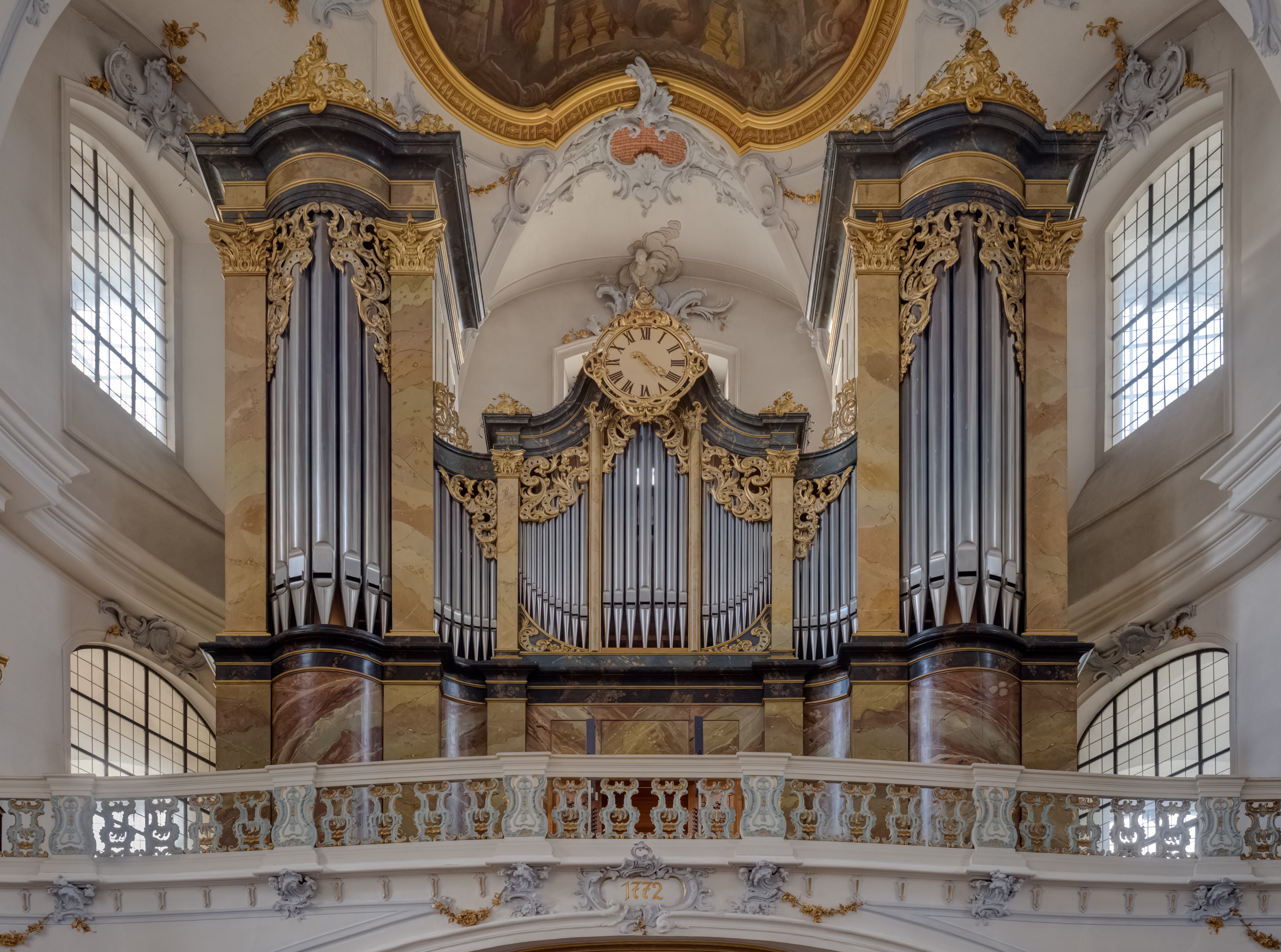
Pipe organ

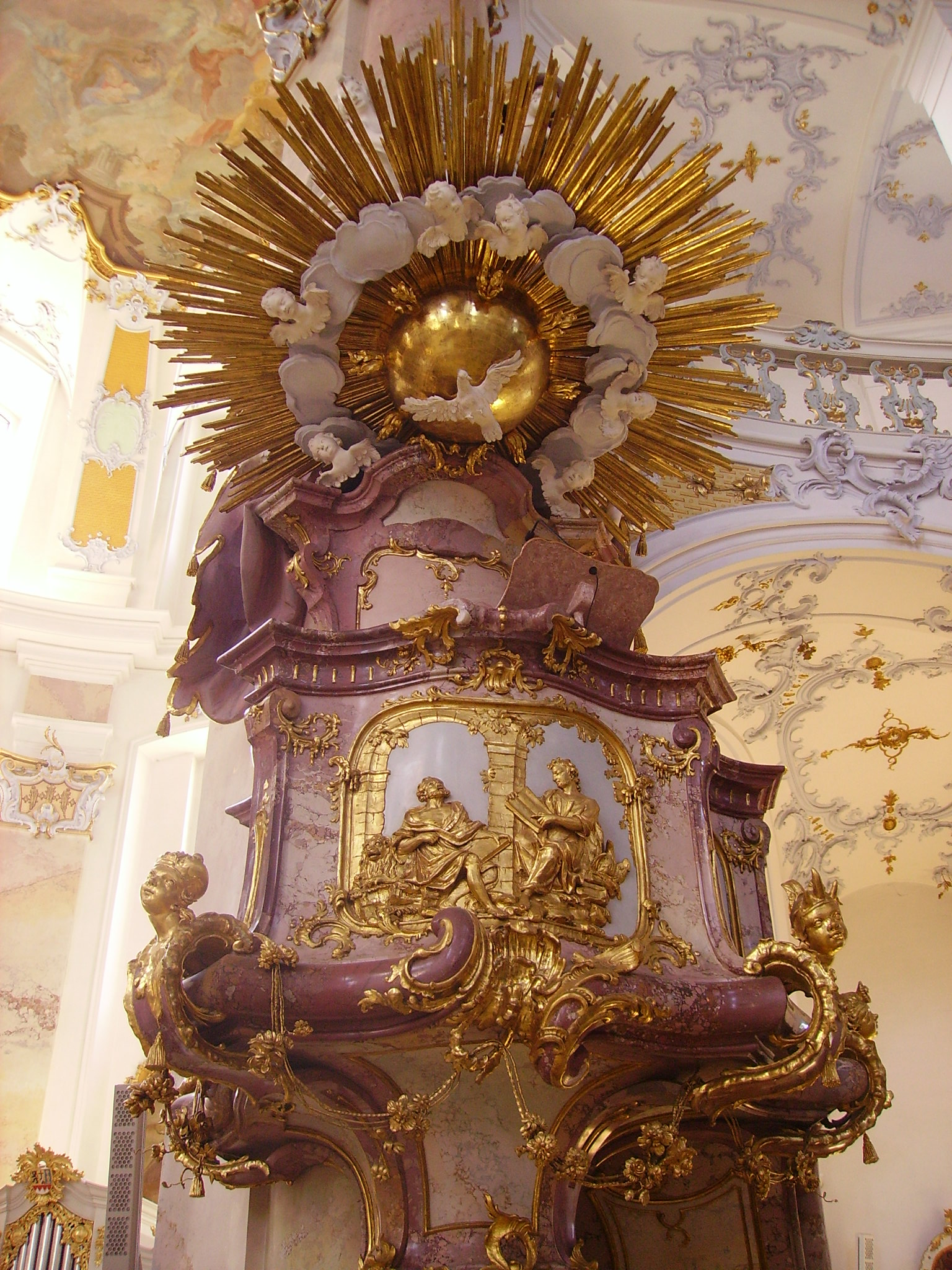
Pulpit of Basilica

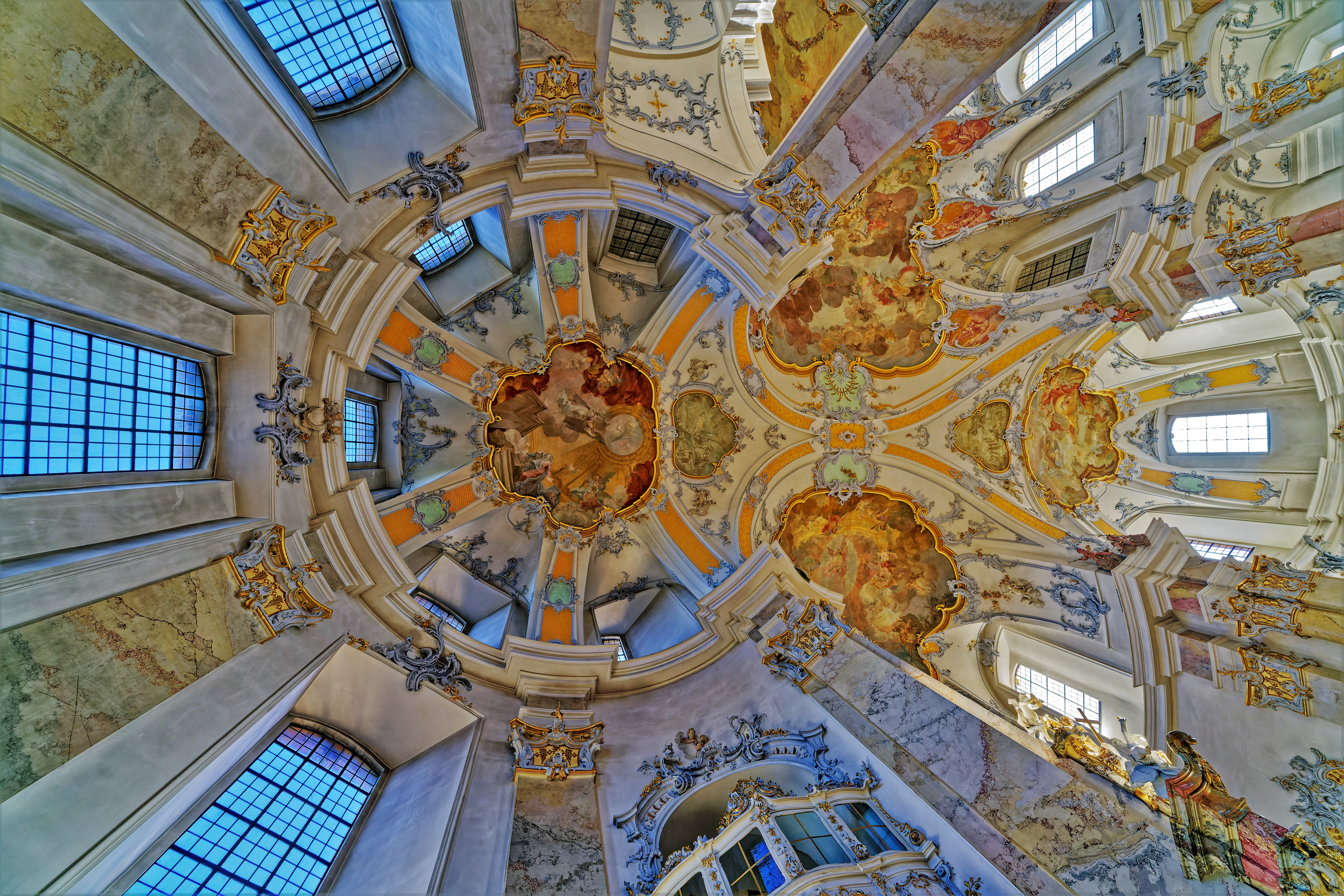
Ceiling of Basilica

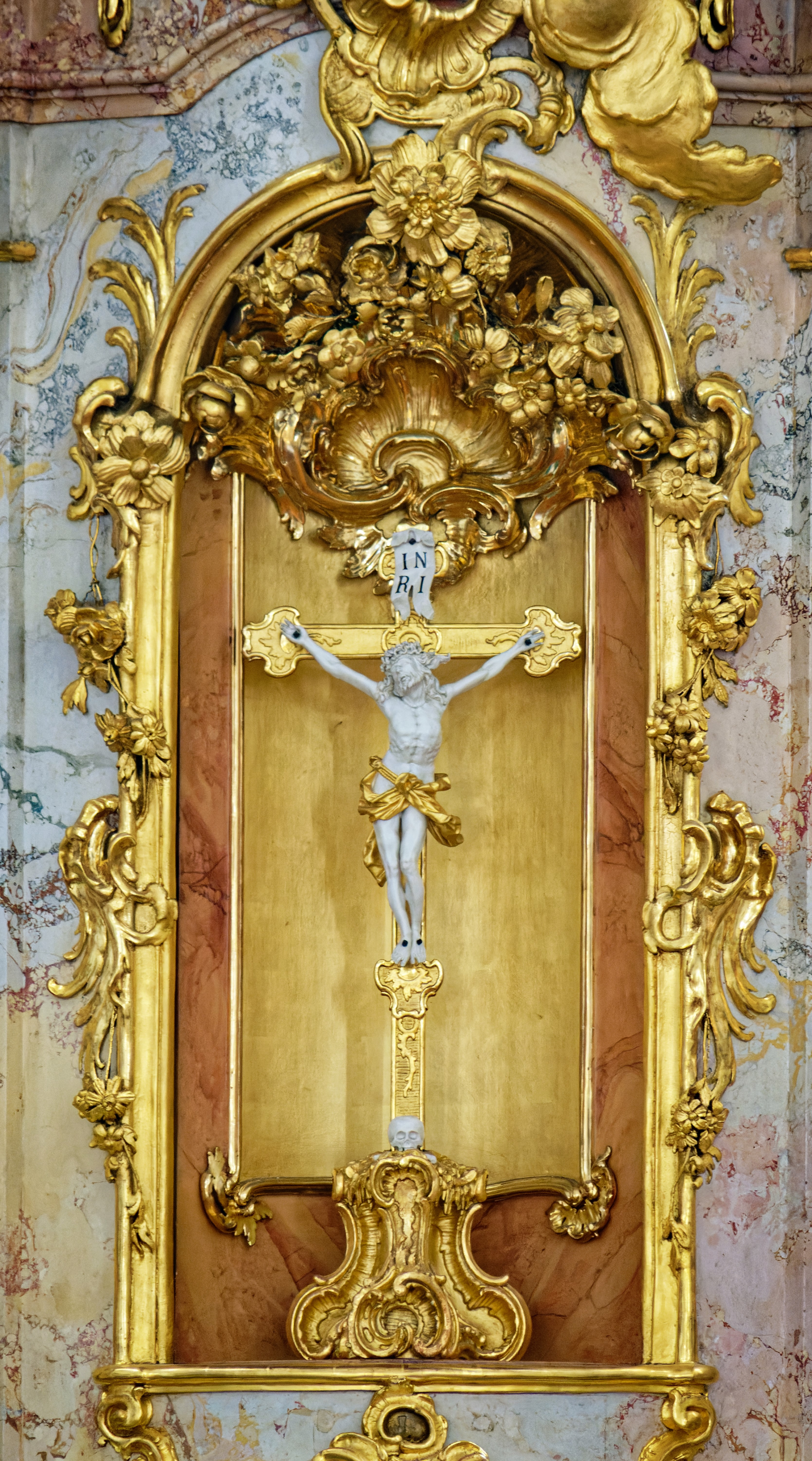
Crucifix on the High Altar

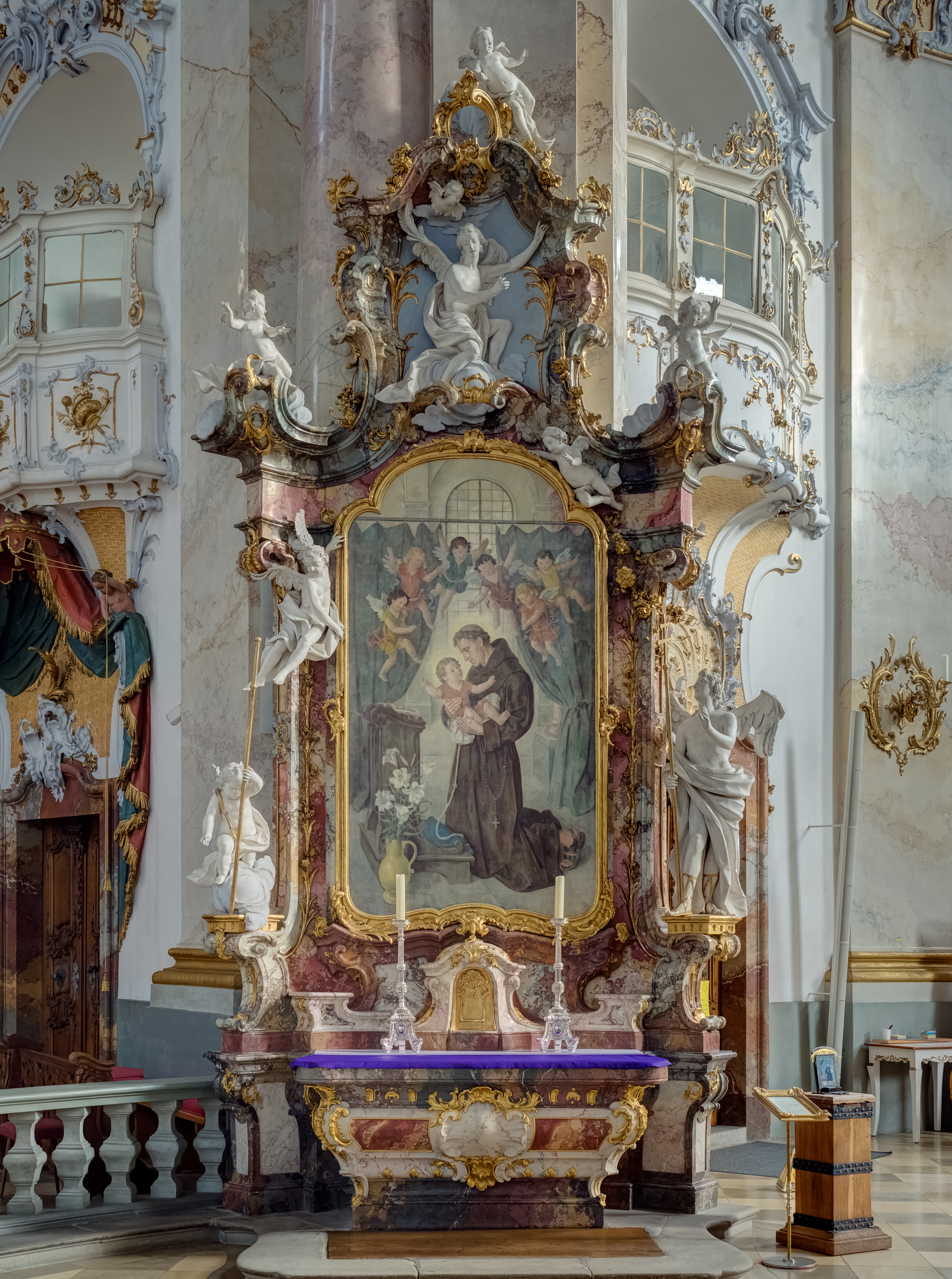
Altar of St Anthony

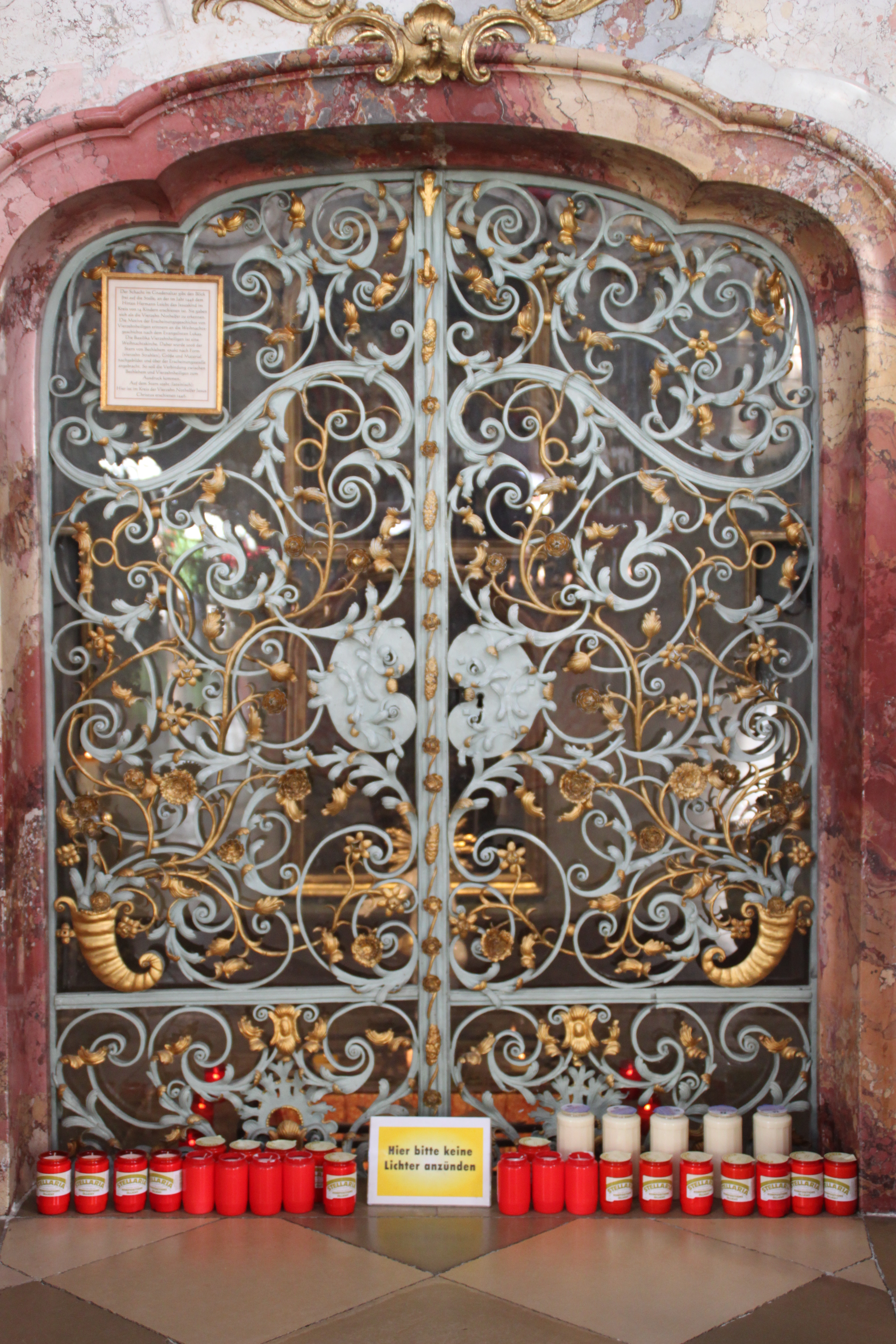
Gate behind the Mercy Altar

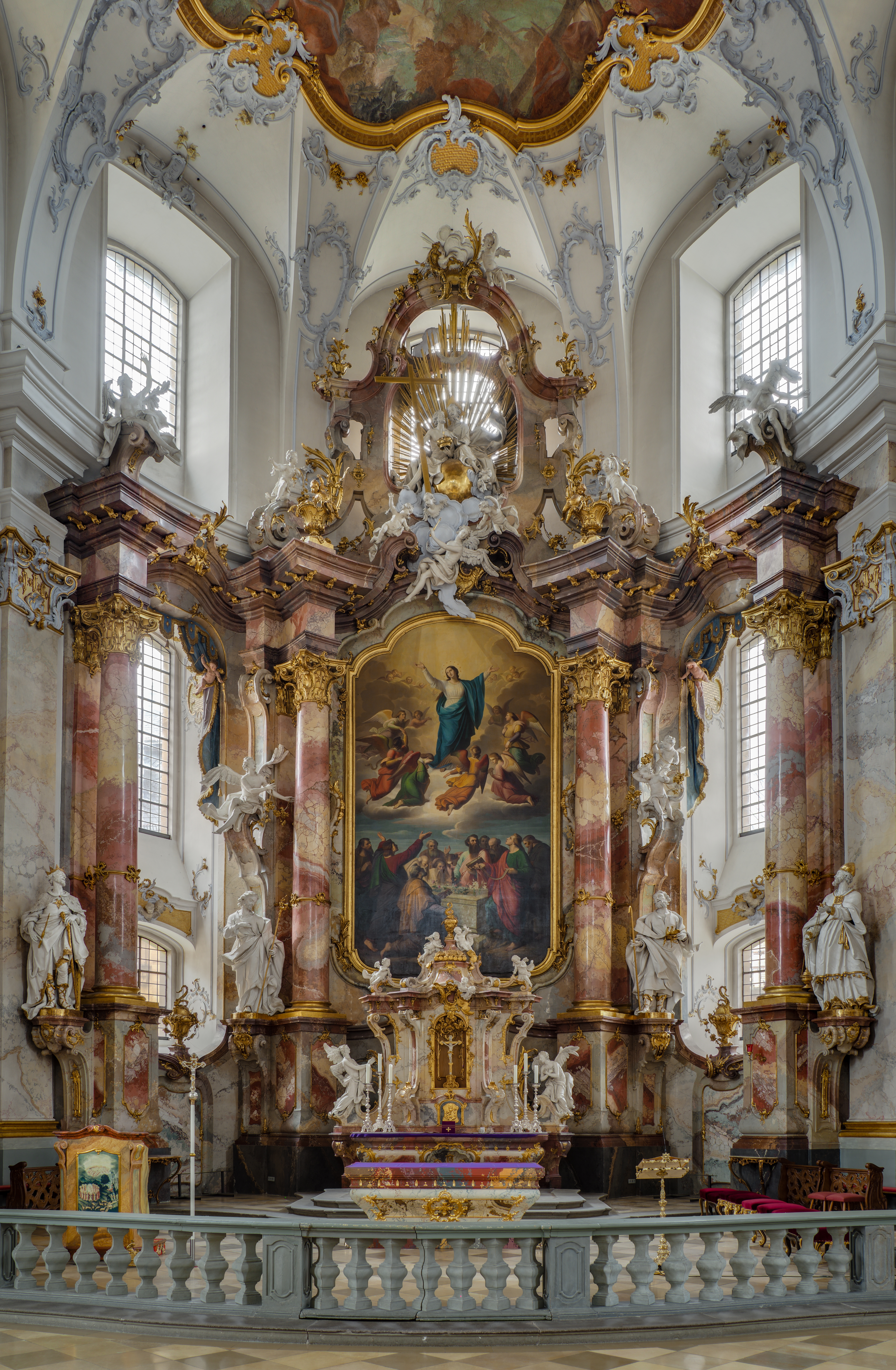
High Altar

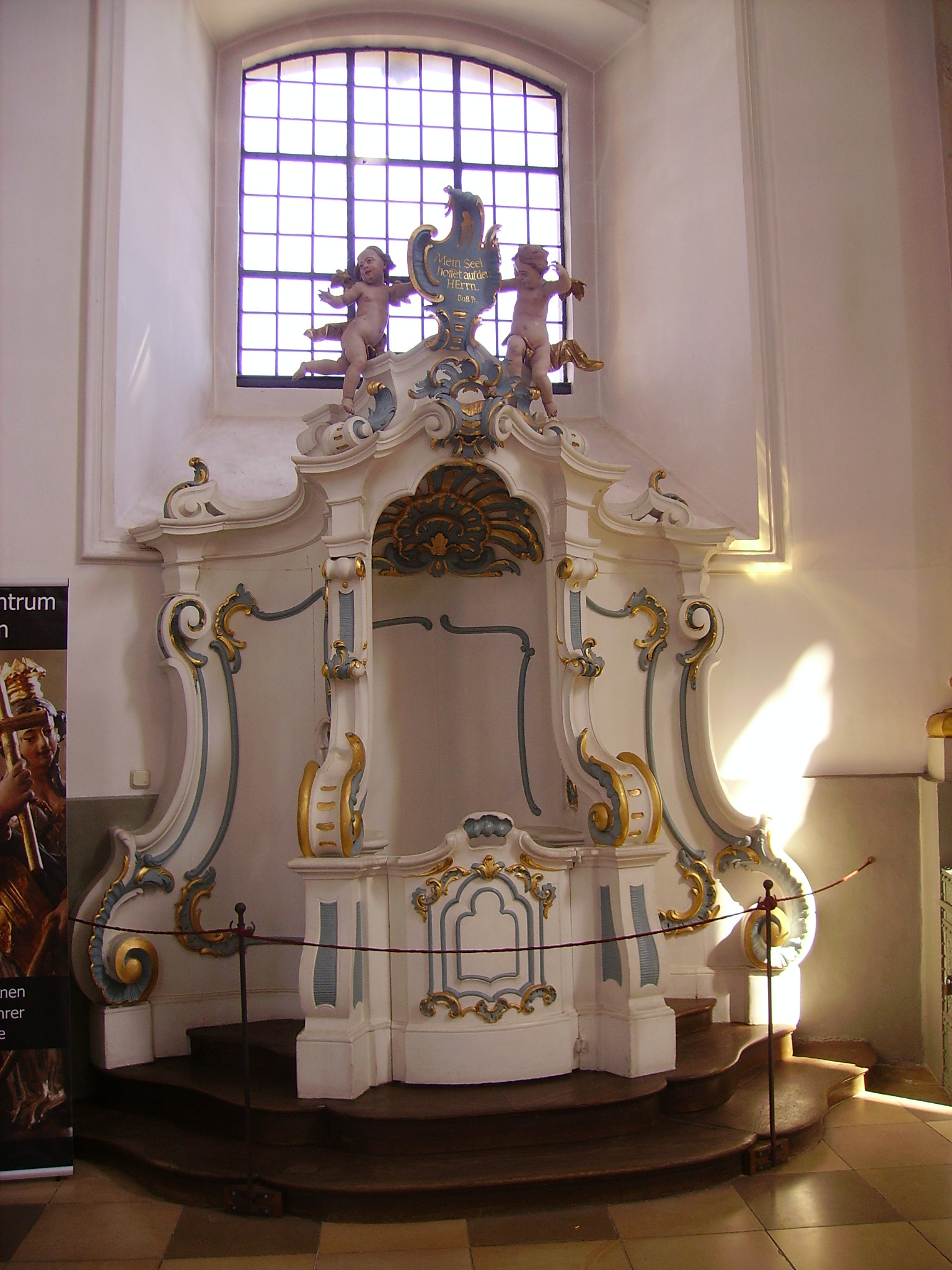
Confessional booth

== See also ==
- 18th-century Western domes
