= Belfast suburban rail =

NI Railways map of lines and stations.

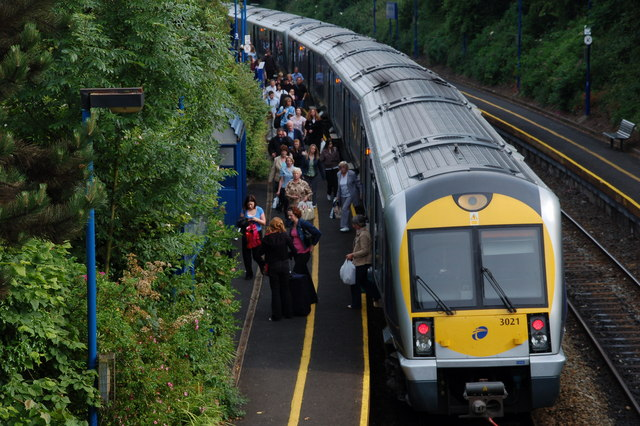
Bangor West with commuters alighting from the train.

The Belfast suburban rail commuter network serves the metropolitan area of Greater Belfast and some of its commuter towns with three lines. The network is owned by Translink and operated by its subsidiary NI Railways.

== Larne line ==
Stations - Belfast Grand Central, City Hospital, Botanic, Lanyon Place, York Street, Whiteabbey, Jordanstown, Greenisland, Trooperslane, Clipperstown, Carrickfergus, Downshire, Whitehead, Ballycarry, Magheramorne, Glynn, Larne Town, Larne Harbour.

== Portadown line ==
Stations - Belfast Grand Central, Adelaide, Balmoral, Finaghy, Dunmurry, Derriaghy, Lambeg, Hilden, Lisburn, Moira, Lurgan, Portadown.

This line has the potential to be extended from Portadown to Armagh city centre by reopening the railway line. Government Minister for the Department for Regional Development, Danny Kennedy MLA indicates railway restoration plans of the line from Portadown to Armagh.

== Bangor line ==
Stations - Belfast Grand Central, Botanic, City Hospital, Belfast Lanyon Place, Titanic Quarter, Sydenham, Holywood, Marino, Cultra, Seahill, Helen's Bay, Carnalea, Bangor West, Bangor.

== Other information ==
- The typical off-peak service on this route is 2tph (trains per hour). The last train of the day arrives in Bangor and Portadown shortly after midnight.
- Services Belfast to Whitehead are typically every 30 mins daytime and hourly evenings and weekends. Trains extend to Larne typically every hour.
- The concept of Suburban was a Northern Ireland Railways marketing campaign in the late 1980s and early 90s when the network was divided into Suburban (near Belfast) and Intercity (beyond), leaving the odd concept of Intercity trains running between Coleraine and the seaside town of Portrush (details). This division is no longer recognised.

== See also ==
- Metro
- Translink
- Northern Ireland Railways
- Dublin Suburban Rail
- Cork Suburban Rail
- Galway Suburban Rail
- Limerick Suburban Rail
