= Lambeg =

Lambeg may refer to:

- Lambeg drum, a large Irish drum
- Lambeg, County Antrim, Northern Ireland
- Lambeg railway station, Lambeg, Northern Ireland
