= Carnalea =

Coordinates: 54.664425°N 5.706625°W

Carnalea: Irish: Carnan Lao
- Near West Church in the centre of Carnalea

- Location within County Down
- Population: 778 (2001)
- Irish grid reference: J479820
  - Belfast: 11 miles
- District: Ards and North Down Borough
- County: County Down
- Country: Northern Ireland
- Sovereign state: United Kingdom
- Post town: BANGOR
- Postcode district: BT19
- Dialling code: 028
- UK Parliament: North Down
- NI Assembly: North Down

Carnalea (/kɑːrnəˈli/; from Irish Carnan Lao 'small mound of the calves') is a townland west of Bangor, County Down, Northern Ireland. It consists of the Killaire area, Station Road area and Seymour area and falls under the control of Ards and North Down Borough Council and within the Bangor West electoral boundary. Carnalea is bordered by Belfast Lough to the North, Crawfordsburn to the immediate West, Wandsworth and Springhill/Rathmore to the immediate South, and Bryansburn to the East, which then leads into Bangor town centre. The area has seen relatively increased development in recent years, including with the creation of several housing developments.

Station Road, off the Crawfordsburn Road, is the central area of Carnalea and leads to Carnalea railway station, Carnalea Golf Club, the North Down coastal path and a private road of modern dwellings in the grounds of a former manor. The Carnalea Residents Association, in conjunction with the Police Service of Northern Ireland (PSNI), has implemented a Neighbourhood Watch scheme in the area.

== Places of interest ==
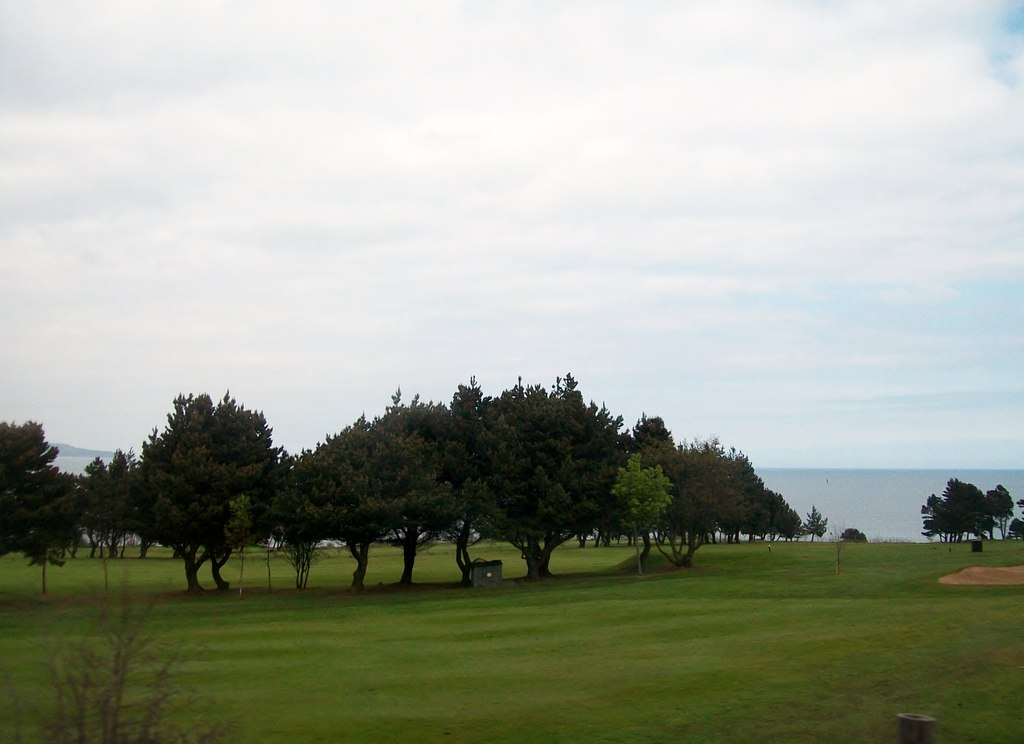
Carnalea Golf Club

Carnalea Golf Club, an 18-hole course, is situated on the coast with views of Belfast Lough and adjacent to the North Down coastal path. The clubhouse at Carnalea began renovation in March 2007. As well as the golf course itself, Carnalea Golf Club also has a bar, restaurant, separate function room, and a snooker room.

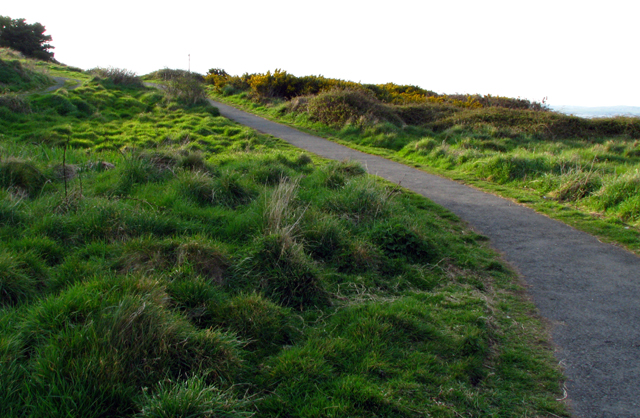
North Down Coastal Path at Carnalea

The North Down Coastal Path, which stretches from Bangor to Holywood and overlooks Belfast Lough, is used by ramblers, dog walkers, runners and cyclists. Alternative access to the coastal path is via Kerr's Wood, a tree-lined pathway originating at the Crawfordsburn Road.

== Travel ==
The Carnalea area is served by Carnalea railway station and two bus stops with both services provided by Translink. The railway station was refurbished by Translink, with the aid of the Carnalea Residents Association in the summer of 2005. Journey times by train to Belfast and Bangor are approximately forty minutes and five minutes respectively operated by Northern Ireland Railways.

== Demographics ==
The population of Carnalea is predominantly elderly. Local nursing home Ailsa Lodge is situated in the Killaire area, whilst another care home bearing Carnalea's name, the Four Seasons Carnalea Nursing Home lies closer towards Bangor town centre in Bryansburn, outside the commonly accepted Carnalea border.

== Religion ==
Carnalea falls within the Church of Ireland Diocese of Down and Dromore, which in Roman Catholic terms is the Diocese of Down and Connor. There are two local churches bearing the Carnalea title, but, much like the Four Seasons Carnalea Nursing Home, only one falls within what would be generally accepted as the Carnalea area. Saint Gall's Parish of Carnalea is an Anglican/Episcopalian place of worship, and is situated at the edge of Carnalea, on the Crawfordsburn Road, beside Bryansburn Rangers FC's Ballywooley Playing Fields. Much further afield is Carnalea Methodist Church. It is the home of the popular Carnalea Wado Kai Karate Club and Carnalea Methodist Youth Club. It lies in the Springhill (Bangor suburb) area of Bangor, commonly known as Rathmore.
