= Derriaghy railway station =

Station in County Antrim, Northern Ireland

Derriaghy
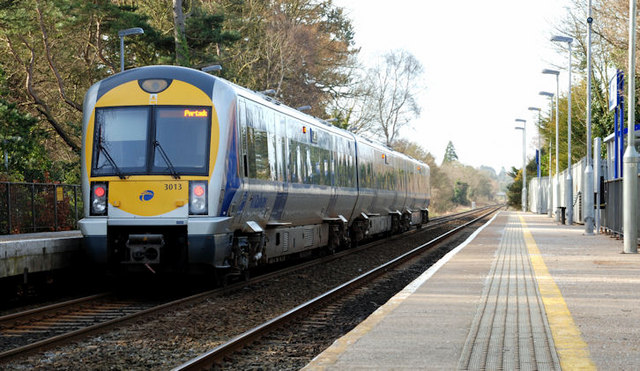
- A train calling at Derriaghy railway station

General information
- Location: Kingsway, Dunmurry, BT17 9BP; Lisburn and Castlereagh; Northern Ireland
- Coordinates: 54.541594°N 6.018338°W
- System: Translink rail halt
- Owner: NI Railways
- Operator: NI Railways
- Line: Dublin–Belfast
- Distance: Dublin Connolly: 107½ miles (173.0 km); Belfast Lanyon Place: 6 miles (9.7 km)
- Platforms: 2
- Tracks: 2

Construction
- Structure type: Embankment
- Parking: No
- Cycle facilities: No

Other information
- Station code: DH
- Fare zone: iLink Zone: 1

History
- Original company: Great Northern Railway (Ireland)

Key dates
- 9 February 1907: Opened as a railmotor halt
- 1 March 1953: Closed to passengers
- 30 April 1958: Reopened
- 2024: Platforms extended for six-carriage trains

Passengers
- 2022/23: 190,218
- 2023/24: ▲218,473
- 2024/25: ▼151,684
- 2025/26: ▲235,635

Services
Preceding station	NI Railways	Following station
Lambeg towards Lisburn, Portadown or Newry	Portadown Line	Dunmurry towards Belfast Grand Central

Historical railways
Preceding station	Historical railways	Following station
Lambeg; Line and station open	Great Northern Railway (Ireland); Belfast–Portadown	Dunmurry; Line and station open
- NI Railways; Translink; NI railway stations
Route map
(Click to expand)
Location
- Location within Northern Ireland Location within island of Ireland

Derriaghy railway station is located in the townland of Derriaghy in County Antrim, Northern Ireland. It lies between the centres of Belfast and Lisburn.

The station opened on 9 February 1907 and was closed to passengers between 1953 and 1958.

== Service ==
Mondays to Saturdays there is a half-hourly service towards Lisburn, Portadown or Newry in one direction, and to Belfast Grand Central in the other. Extra services operate at peak times, and the service reduces to hourly operation in the evenings.

On Sundays there is an hourly service in each direction.

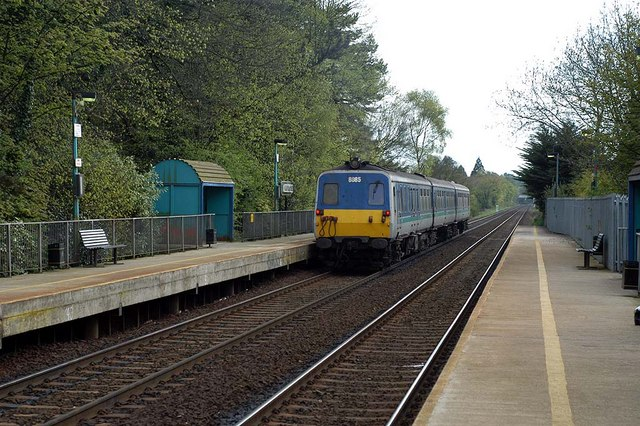
NIR Class 80 train departing Derriaghy in 2004

== 2024 capacity upgrade ==
In December 2018, NIR announced that 21 additional carriages would be purchased from CAF to extend 7 units from the Class 4000 fleet to be 6 carriages in length. Both platform 1 and 2 at Derriaghy were too short (only 3 carriage trains could call at the station) and each platform needed to be 150m in length, so the decision was taken to extend the Lisburn-end of platform 1 but rebuild platform 2 across the Queensway road with a ramp to make the station fully accessible.

A planning application was submitted to Lisburn and Castlereagh City Council in March 2021, of which approval was given in October 2022. Consequently, construction commenced July 2023. The new platform 2 opened on Monday 25 March 2024, and all works are due to be completed by Spring 2024.

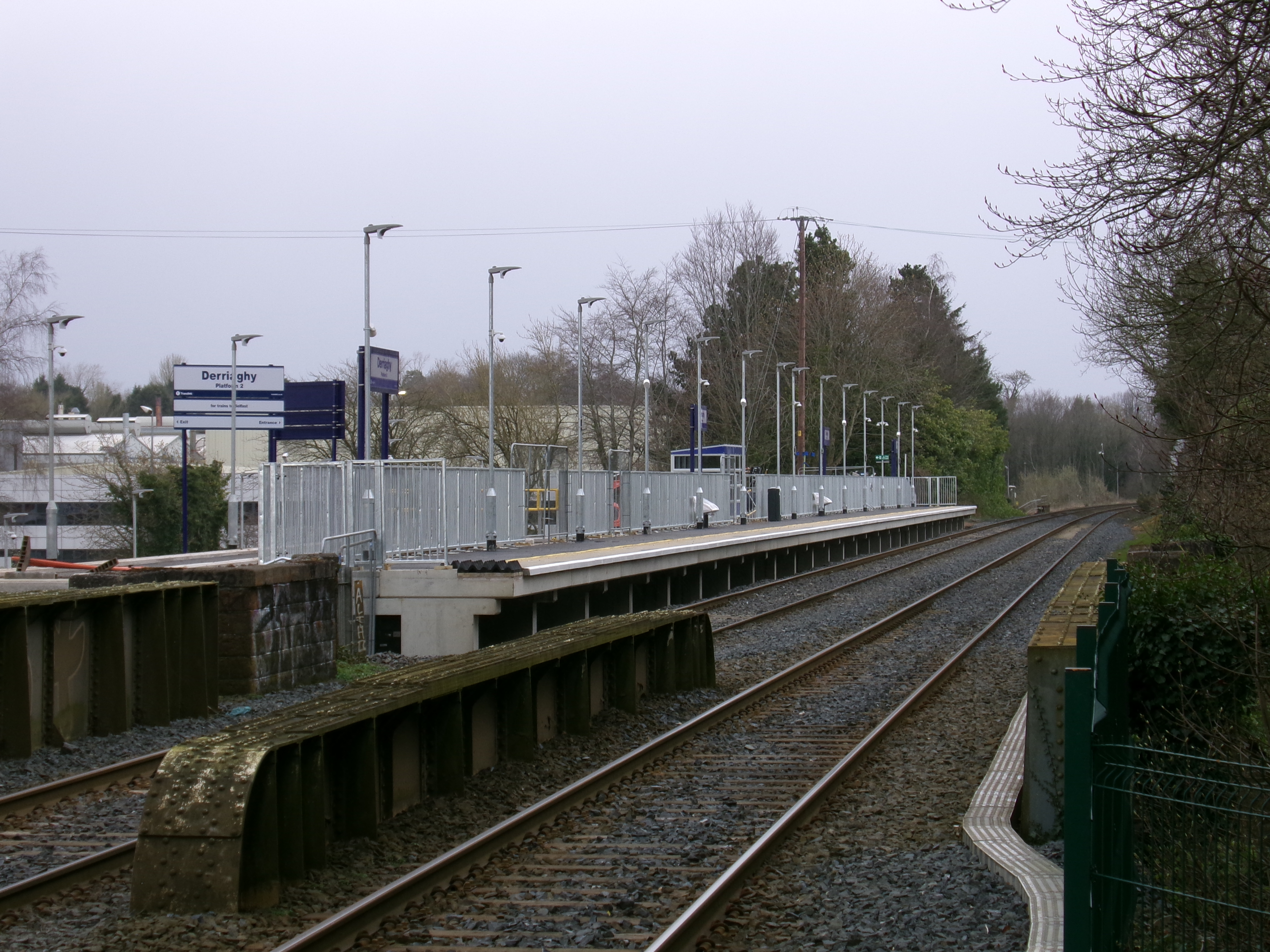
Platform 2 at Derriaghy was replaced by a new structure across the Queensway road. This photo was taken on Saturday 23 March 2024, and the platform opened on Monday 25 March 2024. Platform 1 at Derriaghy was extended to cater for 6-carriage trains. This photo was taken on Saturday 23rd March 2024.
