= Dunmurry railway station =

Railway station in Dunmurry, Northern Ireland

Dunmurry
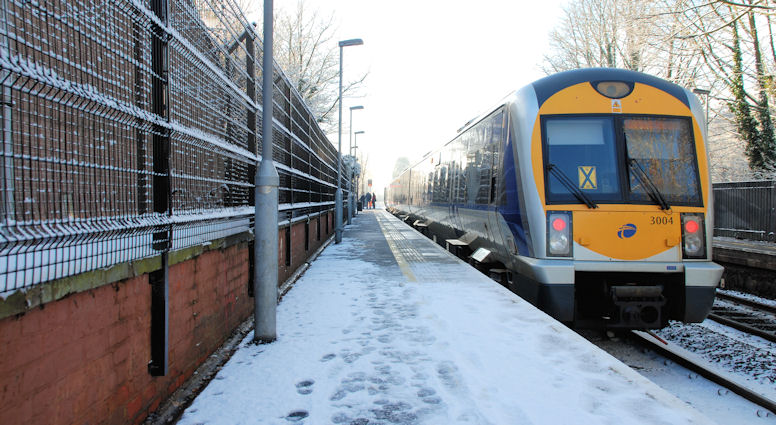
- An NIR Class 3000 train calling at Dunmurry in 2010

General information
- Location: Upper Dunmurry Lane, Dunmurry, BT17 0AE; Belfast; Northern Ireland
- Coordinates: 54.553076°N 6.003059°W
- Grid position: J 292 690
- System: Translink rail halt
- Owner: NI Railways
- Operator: NI Railways
- Line: Dublin–Belfast
- Distance: Dublin Connolly: approx. 108½ miles (174.6 km); Belfast Lanyon Place: approx. 5 miles (8.0 km)
- Platforms: 2
- Tracks: 2

Construction
- Structure type: At-grade
- Parking: No
- Cycle facilities: No
- Accessible: Yes

Other information
- Station code: DM
- Fare zone: iLink Zone: 1

History
- Original company: Ulster Railway
- Pre-grouping: Great Northern Railway (Ireland)
- Post-grouping: Great Northern Railway (Ireland)

Key dates
- 12 August 1839: Opened

Passengers
- 2022/23: 185,101
- 2023/24: ▲222,674
- 2024/25: ▼156,407
- 2025/26: ▲240,399

Services
Preceding station	NI Railways	Following station
Derriaghy towards Lisburn, Portadown or Newry	Portadown Line	Finaghy towards Belfast Grand Central

Historical railways
Preceding station	Historical railways	Following station
Lisburn; Line and station open	Ulster Railway; Belfast–Portadown	Balmoral; Line and station open
Derriaghy; Line and station open	Great Northern Railway (Ireland); Belfast–Dublin	Finaghy; Line and station open
- NI Railways; Translink; NI railway stations
Route map
(Click to expand)
Location
- Location within Northern Ireland Location within island of Ireland

Dunmurry railway station is located in the townland of Dunmurry in west Belfast, County Antrim, Northern Ireland. It is situated on the Belfast–Dublin line.

== History ==
The station opened on 12 August 1839 when the Ulster Railway opened its line between Belfast and Lisburn, a distance of 7 miles 60 chains (12.5 km). The line was initially single-track, with Dunmurry the only intermediate station.

The former GNR(I) Ticket office boarded up in 1987

Passenger traffic at Dunmurry grew rapidly following the opening of the railway, with Belfast accounting for the large majority of journeys from the station during the early 1840s. By 1850, ten daily trains between Belfast and Lisburn called at Dunmurry, with the frequency increasing further during the remainder of the nineteenth century.

On 17 January 1980, an explosion occurred aboard a Ballymena–Belfast passenger train in the vicinity of Dunmurry. Three people were killed and five others were injured in the resulting fire. The incident became known as the Dunmurry train bombing.

== Facilities ==
Dunmurry is an unmanned station with two platforms. Both platforms have step-free access by ramps, and sheltered seating is provided. The station has a ticket vending machine and audio announcements, but no passenger information displays.

There is no station car park or bicycle parking. The station has no public toilets, shops or refreshment facilities.

== Service ==
Mondays to Saturdays there is a half hourly service towards Lisburn, Portadown or Newry in one direction, and to Belfast Grand Central in the other. Extra services operate at peak times, and the service reduces to hourly operation in the evenings.

On Sundays there is an hourly service in each direction.

The Enterprise service between Belfast Grand Central and Dublin Connolly passes through Dunmurry but does not call at the station.

== Gallery ==
An 80 Class running the Lisburn to Bangor Service in 1986

A train passing the remains of the Dunmurry singal cabin in 1976

A railtour passing Dunmurry in 1987

A Bangor bound service at Dunmurry in 2013

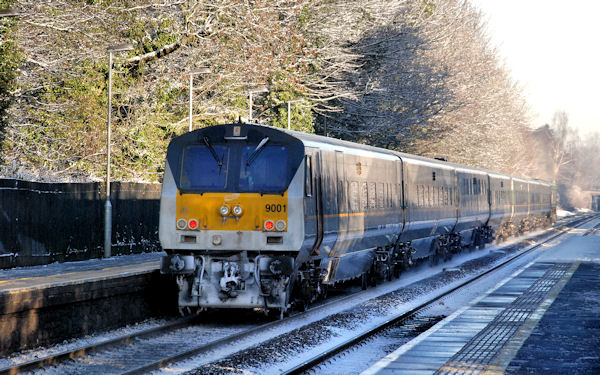
The Enterprise passing Dunmurry in 2010 headed for Belfast

== Bibliography ==
- Ayres, Bob (2003). "Irish Railway Station Dates" (PDF). Irish Railway Record Society.
- Hajducki, S. Maxwell (1974). A Railway Atlas of Ireland. Newton Abbot: David & Charles. ISBN 0-7153-5167-2.
- Patterson, Edward Mervyn (2003). The Great Northern Railway (Ireland). Usk: Oakwood. ISBN 978-0-85361-602-3. OCLC 1345568131.
