= Lambeg railway station =

Railway station in County Antrim, Northern Ireland

Lambeg
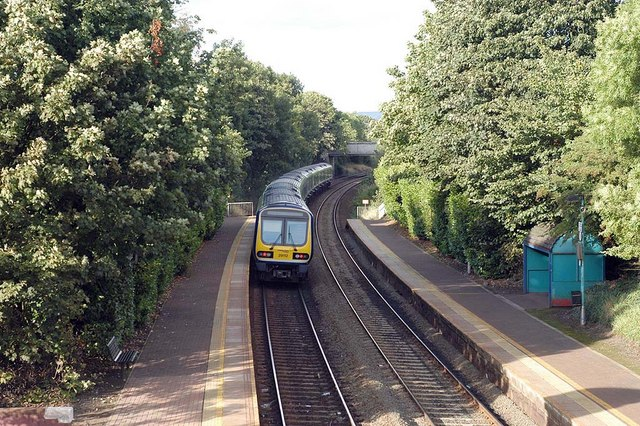
- IE Class 29000 train passing through Lambeg in 2005.

General information
- Location: Station Road, Lambeg, BT27 4QP; Lisburn and Castlereagh; Northern Ireland
- Coordinates: 54.529553°N 6.029675°W
- Grid position: J 2765 6645
- System: Translink rail halt
- Owner: NI Railways
- Operator: NI Railways
- Line: Dublin–Belfast
- Distance: Belfast Lanyon Place: 6½ miles (10.5 km); Dublin Connolly: 107 miles (172.2 km)
- Platforms: 2
- Tracks: 2

Construction
- Structure type: At-grade
- Parking: No
- Cycle facilities: No
- Accessible: Yes

Other information
- Station code: LG
- Fare zone: iLink Zone: 2
- Website: translink.co.uk/lambeg

History
- Opened: 1 September 1877
- Original company: Great Northern Railway (Ireland)

Key dates
- 1964: Signal cabin ceased operation following colour-light resignalling

Passengers
- 2022/23: 122,662
- 2023/24: ▲153,951
- 2024/25: ▼114,587
- 2025/26: ▲170,113

Services
Preceding station	NI Railways	Following station
Hilden towards Lisburn, Portadown or Newry	Portadown Line	Derriaghy towards Belfast Grand Central

Historical railways
Preceding station	Historical railways	Following station
Hilden; Line and station open	Great Northern Railway (Ireland); Belfast–Portadown	Derriaghy; Line and station open
- NI Railways; Translink; NI railway stations
Route map
(Click to expand)
Location
- Location within Northern Ireland Location within island of Ireland

Lambeg railway station serves Lambeg in County Antrim, Northern Ireland. The station opened on 1 September 1877.

== History ==
Lambeg railway station opened on 1 September 1877 on the former Ulster Railway route between Belfast and Lisburn, which had originally opened in 1839. The line later formed part of the Great Northern Railway (Ireland) network.

The station originally featured a signal cabin at the Belfast end of the down platform. The signal cabin remained in operation until 1964, when the route was resignalled with colour-light signals.

== Service ==
Mondays to Saturdays there is a half-hourly service towards Lisburn, Portadown or Newry in one direction, and to Belfast Grand Central in the other. Extra services run in at peak times, and the service reduces to hourly operation in the evenings.

On Sundays there is an hourly service in each direction.
