= Hilden railway station =

Railway station in County Antrim, Northern Ireland

Hilden
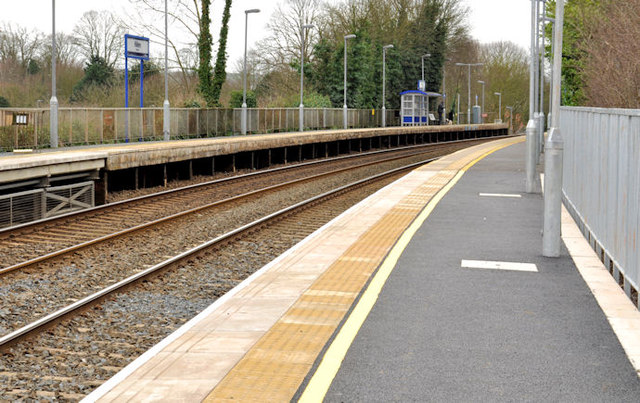

General information
- Location: Lisburn; Northern Ireland
- Coordinates: 54°31′22″N 6°1′46″W
- System: Translink rail halt
- Owner: NI Railways
- Operator: NI Railways
- Line: Dublin–Belfast
- Platforms: 2
- Tracks: 2

Construction
- Structure type: At-grade

Other information
- Station code: HD

Key dates
- 1907: Opened

Passengers
- 2022/23: 86,944
- 2023/24: ▲104,885
- 2024/25: ▼79,145
- 2025/26: ▲119,699

Services
| Preceding station | NI Railways | Following station |
|---|---|---|
| Lisburn towards Lisburn, Portadown or Newry | Portadown Line | Lambeg towards Belfast Grand Central |

Historical railways
| Preceding station | Historical railways | Following station |
|---|---|---|
| Lisburn; Line and station open | Great Northern Railway (Ireland); Belfast–Dublin | Lambeg; Line and station open |
- NI Railways; Translink; NI railway stations
Route map
(Click to expand)
Location
- Location within Northern Ireland Location within island of Ireland

Hilden railway station is located in Lisburn, County Antrim, Northern Ireland. The station opened on 1 May 1907, originally as Hilden Halt.

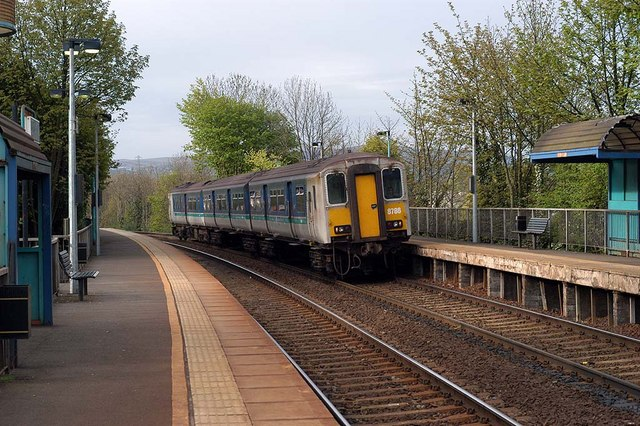
NIR Class 450 train at Hilden in 2004.

== Services ==
=== Train Services ===
Mondays to Saturdays there is a half-hourly service towards Lisburn, Portadown or Newry in one direction, and to Belfast Grand Central in the other. Extra services run at peak times, and the service reduces to hourly operation in the evenings.

On Sundays there is an hourly service in each direction.
