= Carnalea railway station =

Station in County Down, Northern Ireland

Carnalea
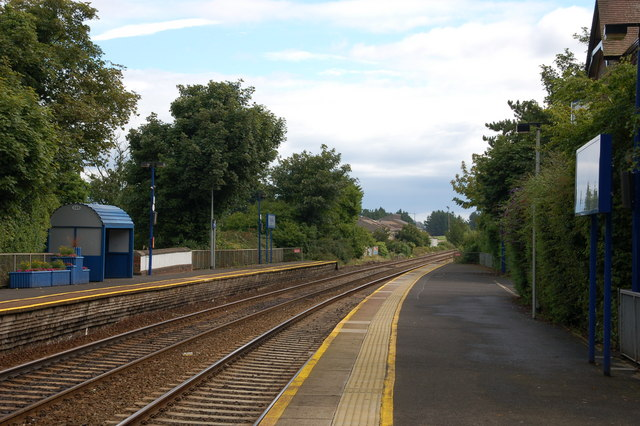
- Carnalea station in 2006. This is the view towards Bangor with the down platform on the left.

General information
- Location: Carnalea, Bangor; Northern Ireland
- Coordinates: 54°39′58″N 5°42′21″W
- Owner: NI Railways
- Operator: NI Railways
- Line: Bangor
- Platforms: 2
- Tracks: 2

Construction
- Structure type: At-grade

Other information
- Station code: CA

Key dates
- 1877: Opened
- 2008: Refurbished

Passengers
- 2022/23: 78,041
- 2023/24: ▲96,759
- 2024/25: ▼95,589
- 2025/26: ▲104,018
- NI Railways; Translink; NI railway stations
Route map
(Click to expand)
Location
- Location within Northern Ireland Location within island of Ireland

Carnalea railway station is located in the townland of Carnalea in northwest Bangor, County Down, Northern Ireland.

It was first opened by the B.C.D.R. (Belfast and County Down Railway) on its present site at Station Walk on 1 June 1877 with only an up platform, and a brake van as an office.

Through the advent of wooden villas in the late 19th century, the B.C.D.R. (Belfast and County Down Railway) built a station house on the upside in 1897, most of which still stands. The station master's former dwelling is the oldest building in the area.

The station's low-set signal cabin (disused since the 1930s) and downside shelter have been demolished since the Northern Ireland Railways takeover in 1967. Glass shelters exist on the sites of the former waiting areas.

The station remains popular and many locals commute to Belfast via the station each morning, with just under 97,000 passengers boarding or alighting at the station in the 2023/24 financial year.

== Service ==
From Mondays to Saturdays there is a half-hourly service towards Belfast Grand Central in one direction, and Bangor in the other. Extra services operate at peak times, and the service reduces to hourly operation in the evenings. Certain peak-time express trains will pass through Carnalea station without stopping.

On Sundays there is an hourly service in each direction.

Preceding station	NI Railways	Following station
Helen's Bay	Northern Ireland Railways; Belfast-Bangor Line	Bangor West
