= Adelaide Depot =

Railway Depot in Belfast, Northern Ireland

Adelaide Depot (Translink)

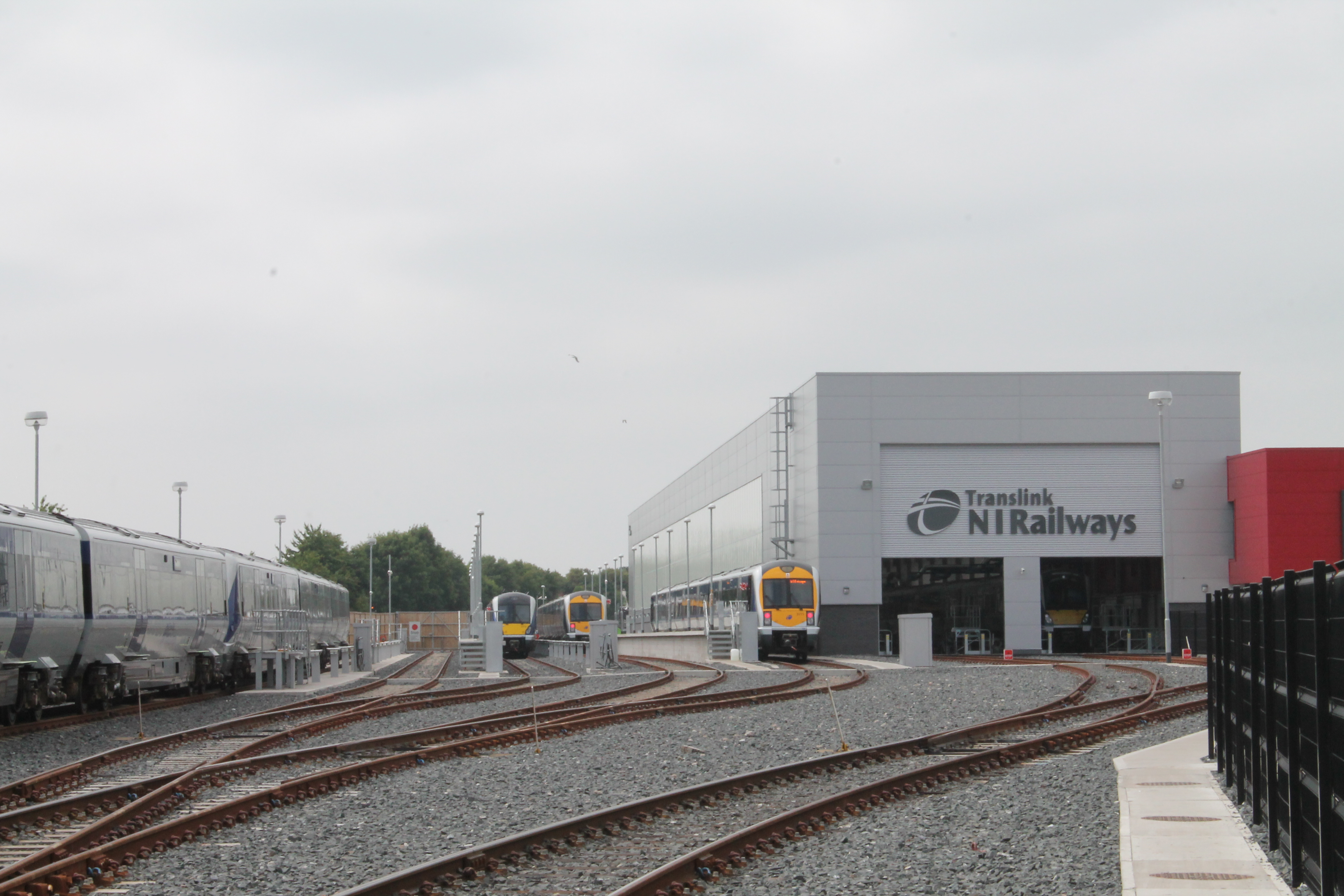
- Adelaide Depot in 2013
- Interactive map of Adelaide Depot (Translink)

Location
- Location: Adelaide Depot, Building B,8 Falcon Road, Belfast, BT12 6PU
- Coordinates: 54.57585°N 5.95797°W

Characteristics
- Owner: NI Railways
- Type: DMU
- Rolling stock: Class 3000; Class 4000
- Routes served: Bangor; Derry~Londonderry; Dublin Only Class 3000; Larne; Portadown/Newry

History
- Opened: 2012

Adelaide Depot is a railway maintenance facility operated by Northern Ireland Railways (NIR). It is situated adjacent to Adelaide railway station along the Belfast–Dublin railway line in Belfast, Northern Ireland. The depot primarily serves as a maintenance, refuelling, washing, and stabling location for NIR's diesel multiple unit (DMU) fleet.

== History ==
Adelaide Depot opened in December 2012 and occupies the site of a former freight terminal. The facility cost £28 million and was developed to relieve pressure on Translink’s existing train maintenance facilities at York Road and Fortwilliam for its growing fleet of Class 3000 and Class 4000 trains. Translink’s Fleet Engineer, Richard Noble, highlighted the importance of the facility as a modern and well-designed space that accommodates staff needs and efficient component movement.

== Facilities ==
The depot comprises a 5,100 m² maintenance building, 20,000 m² of material storage and 400 m² of office space. It supports train lengths of up to 138 metres and features six storage roads with a total track length of around 2,000 meters. Two pit roads are available for maintenance and there are lifting jacks capable of lifting an entire three-car train. The depot also has a train wash, facilities for supplying fuel, AdBlue and sand.

The depot incorporates sustainable technologies such as energy-efficient lighting, solar panels, grey water harvesting systems, and durable alternative concrete troughs for cable management, praised for both aesthetics and resilience.

== See also ==
- Multiple Units of Ireland
