= NI Railways =

Rail operator in Northern Ireland

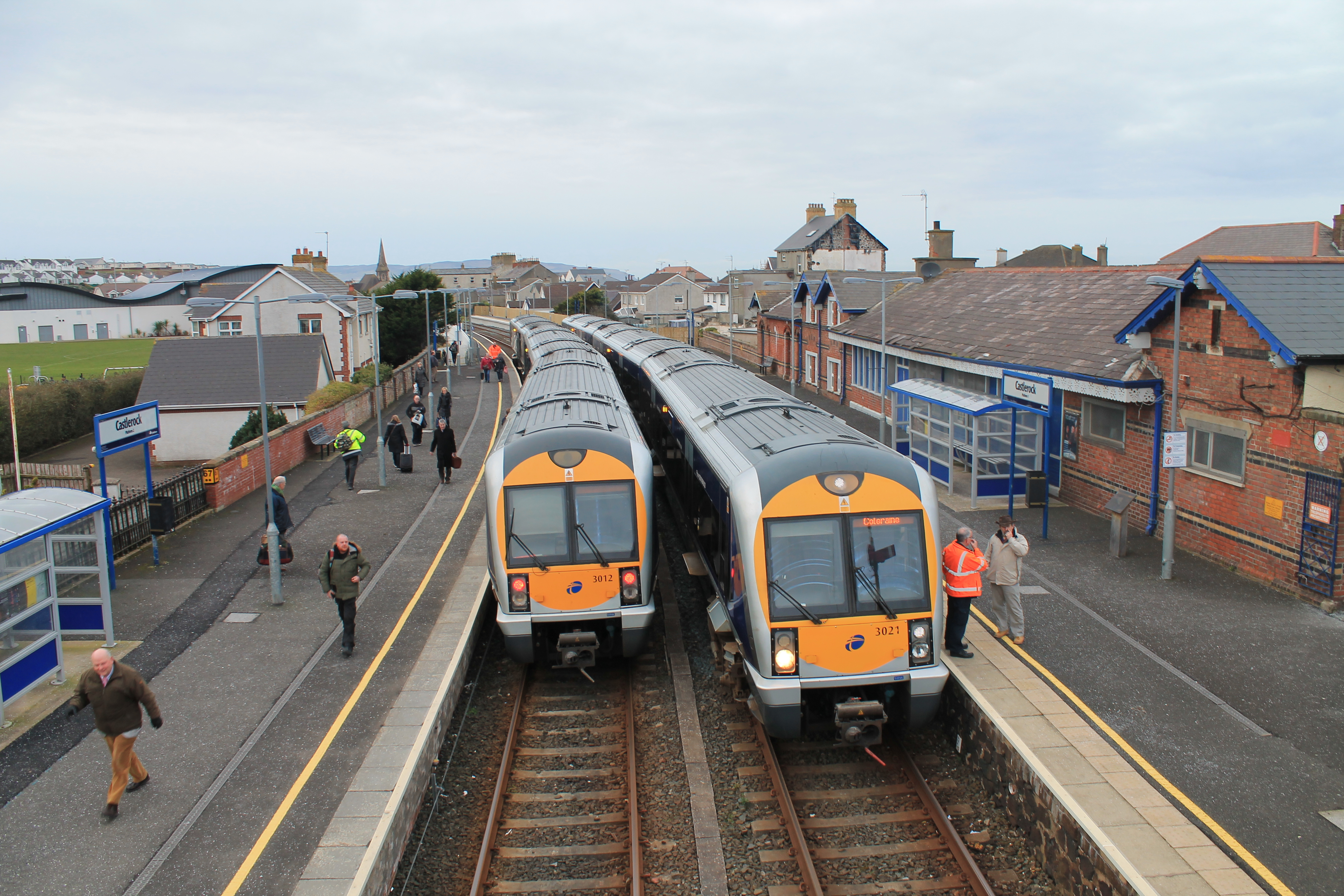
- Class 3000 trains at Castlerock

Overview
- Main region: Northern Ireland
- Fleet: 47
- Stations called at: 54
- Parent company: NITHCo (Translink)
- Dates of operation: 1967–
- Predecessor: Ulster Transport Authority

Technical
- Track gauge: 1,600 mm (5 ft 3 in) Irish gauge
- Electrification: Unelectrified Network
- Length: 333 kilometres (207 mi)
- Operating speed: National speed limit: 90 mph (145 km/h)

Other
- Website: www.translink.co.uk
Route map

NI Railways, also known as Northern Ireland Railways (NIR; and for a brief period Ulster Transport Railways; UTR), is the railway operator in Northern Ireland. NIR is a subsidiary of Translink, the Northern Ireland Transport Holding Company (NITHCo). It has a common Board of Management with the other two companies in the group, Ulsterbus and Metro (formerly Citybus).

The rail network in Northern Ireland is not part of the National Rail network of Great Britain, nor does it use standard gauge, instead using Irish gauge in common with the Republic of Ireland. Also, NIR is the only commercial non-heritage passenger operator in the United Kingdom to operate a vertical integration model, with responsibility of all aspects of the network including running trains, maintaining rolling stock and infrastructure, and pricing. Since the Single European Railway Directive 2012, the company has allowed open access operations by other rail operators, although no operator has started such a service. In 2019, NI Railways carried over 15 million passengers.

NIR is part of the wider rail network in Ireland and it jointly runs the Enterprise train service between Belfast and Dublin with Iarnród Éireann. There is no link to the rail system in Great Britain; proposals have been made, but allowances would have to be made for the different rail gauge in use in Great Britain (standard gauge) and Ireland (Irish gauge).

== History ==
From the early 20th century until 1948, the three main railway companies in Northern Ireland were the Great Northern Railway Ireland (GNRI), which had around one half of its network north of the border; the Northern Counties Committee (NCC), owned by the Midland Railway of England and later the London, Midland and Scottish Railway (LMS); and the small Belfast and County Down Railway (BCDR). The Transport Act (Northern Ireland) 1948 created the Ulster Transport Authority (UTA), which took over the BCDR later that year, followed by the NCC in 1949 as a result of the Ireland Act 1949. In 1958, the GNRI was dissolved and its lines north of the border were also taken over by the UTA. Under the UTA's management, the railway network of Northern Ireland shrank from 900 miles (1,450 km) to 225 miles (362 km). The UTA was split into rail and road operations in 1967, and the rail operations were taken over by the present company Northern Ireland Railways (NIR). Suffering frequent disruption and damage to infrastructure caused by the Troubles and starved of investment by successive political administrations, the NIR network had become badly run down by the 1960s, with old rolling stock and poorly maintained track. NIR's last steam locomotives were withdrawn in 1970. In 1970, NIR re-launched the once-popular Enterprise between Dublin and Belfast with three new NIR Class 101 diesel locomotives built by Hunslet in England and Mark 2B carriages built by British Rail Engineering Limited (BREL). Despite frequent interruptions due to bomb scares, the service has remained a more or less constant feature of the NIR network.

As older trains became obsolete in the 1970s, the Class 80 slam-door diesel-electric multiple unit was introduced. BREL built these units between 1974 and 1977 to British Rail's Mark 2 design with some trailer cars rebuilt from hauled stock. The power cars were powered by an English Electric 4SRKT engine, nicknamed 'Thumpers' due to their characteristic sound, and had two English Electric 538 traction motors. These entered service on the suburban lines around Belfast, becoming a stalwart on the whole network. They remained in service until 2012, latterly primarily on the Larne-Belfast line and the Coleraine-Portrush Line. In the early 1980s, NIR purchased one of the prototype LEV Railbuses built to test the railbus concept. This was intended for the Coleraine-Portrush branch, but was withdrawn due to the capacity constraints of a single car. A plan was mooted to use it on the Lisburn-Antrim line to prevent it from being closed. This proposal failed, again because of the limited capacity.

NIR has three EMD class 111 locomotives, 111–113, for freight and passenger use, built in October 1980 (111–112) and December 1984 (113). During the eighties it was apparent that additional trains would be needed. BREL built nine 450 Class sets on former Mark 1 underframes between 1985 and 1987. The power cars had an English Electric 4SRKT engine recovered from former 70 Class units (except 459, which used the engine recovered from 80 Class power car 88) and had two English Electric 538 traction motors. The sets were three-car diesel-electric multiple units, based on a more modern British design, with air-operated sliding doors. They were withdrawn from service in 2012 and replaced by new 4000 Class diesel multiple units. In 1994, NIR bought two EMD 208 Class locomotives identical to Iarnród Éireann's 201 Class. These haul the cross-border Enterprise dedicated trains of modern carriages.

Since 2002, NIR has modernised its rolling stock, with a full fleet replacement of new trains built by the Spanish company CAF. 23 Class 3000 diesel multiple units made up the first batch of trains ordered at a cost of £80 million. They offered greater capacity, performance and accessibility than their predecessors when they were delivered in 2004 and 2005. The next order was for 20 Class 4000s, built 2010–2012. These offered similar benefits to the Class 3000s and completed the fleet replacement. Additionally, NIR has purchased 23 new carriages, via an option in the existing Class 4000 train procurement contract, these are to be used to extend Seven trains from three cars to six cars, which will add much more capacity and will also allow only one guard to be needed on a six-car train, which required two before. In 2021, Translink announced it would change all of its iconic logos (used for the previous 25 years in the Translink brand and sub brands such as NI Railways, Ulsterbus & Metro) to a new design. The design was intended to focus to "modernise and simplify the brand presence". The creation of the logo cost £15,000 and was created by Belfast-based company McCadden Design in partnership with Translink.

== Performance ==
Translink's performance statistics for the 26 weeks up to 30 March 2025 noted an average punctuality for rail services of 96.2 %, with the Portadown/Newry Line showing the greatest average punctuality at 97.8 %, and the Portrush Line the least at 94.2 %. Among other accolades, NIR won the UK Rail Business of the Year Award for 2008.

Logo used from 1987 to 1996

NIR carried 13.4 million passengers in 2014–15 (up from 10.4 million in 2010–2011), representing 417 million passenger-km and earning £43.6 million in ticket sales.

In 2018–2019, NIR recorded 15.8 million passenger journeys, the largest in the company's 50-year history.

NIR Passenger Numbers Since 2010
Year	Total
2010 - 2011	▲10.4 million
2011 - 2012	▲10.7 million
2012 - 2013	▲11.5 million
Final ageing 80 and 450 Class trains are replaced with modern C4K railcars
2013 - 2014	▲12.5 million
2014 - 2015	▲13.4 million
2015 - 2016	▲13.5 million
2016 - 2017	▲14.2 million
2017 - 2018	▲15.0 million
NI Railways' 50th Anniversary
2018 - 2019	▲15.8 million
COVID-19 pandemic begins, bringing with it long periods of travel restrictions
2019 - 2020	▼15.1 million
2020 - 2021	▼3.3 million
2021 - 2022	▲8.7 million
End of COVID-19 travel restrictions
2022 - 2023	▲11.5 million
2023 - 2024	▲13.8 million
Rail services disrupted from May to October to facilitate switchover to Belfast Grand Central station
2024 - 2025	▼13.3 million

== Rolling stock ==
=== Current fleet ===
Class	Image	Type	Top speed		Number Delivered	Routes operated	Built
Class	Image	Type	mph	km/h	Number Delivered	Routes operated	Built
Passenger fleet
Class 3000		Diesel multiple unit	90	145	23	Belfast – Derry~Londonderry; Belfast – Newry; Belfast – Bangor; Belfast – Larne; Coleraine – Portrush; Belfast – Dublin (Enterprise)^{a}	2003–2005
Class 4000		Diesel multiple unit	90	145	20	Belfast – Derry~Londonderry; Belfast – Newry; Belfast – Bangor; Belfast – Larne; Coleraine – Portrush	2010–2021
Infrastructure fleet
111 Class		Diesel locomotive	90	145	3	Infrastructure duties	1980–1984
201 Class		Diesel locomotive	102	164	2	Belfast - Dublin (Enterprise); Infrastructure duties	1994–1995
MPV		Diesel multiple unit	62	100	1	Sandite duties	2016
^{a} Only 6 Class 3000 units are equipped with CAWS, which allows them to operate in the Republic of Ireland.

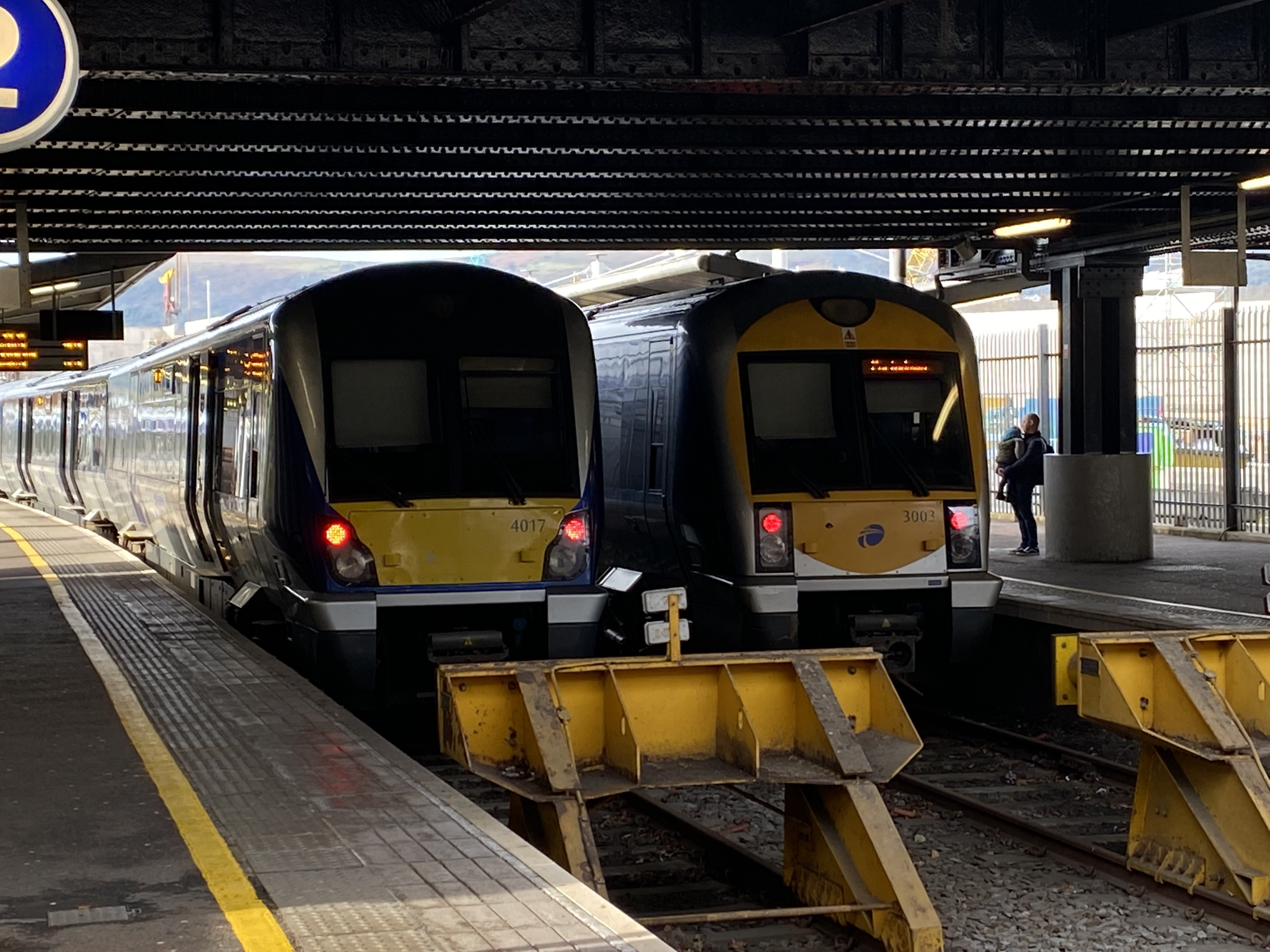
NI Railways Class 4000 (left) and Class 3000 (right); side by side at Great Victoria Street Station, Belfast, October 2022.

NIR also owns half of the 28 De Dietrich stock coaches used by Enterprise, the international service between Belfast and Dublin. These units have their own unique livery, and do not operate under NIR branding or on any other services in Northern Ireland or the Republic. In 2005, NIR investigated obtaining seven Class 222 DEMUs built for British operator Midland Mainline to use for Enterprise, but these entered service with their intended operator. They would have required significant modification to enable NIR to use them, including conversion from standard gauge to Irish gauge.

NIR retained one Class 80 unit (three power cars and two driving trailers) as its sandite train during the 2012-2017 leaf fall seasons. It was planned that a Class 450 unit was to be used for this role. However, in 2015, Translink awarded a contract to Windhoff Bahn AG to procure a new double ended multi-purpose vehicle to undertake sandite and high-pressure water spraying, as well as weed killing operations.

==== "New Trains" fleet replacement ====
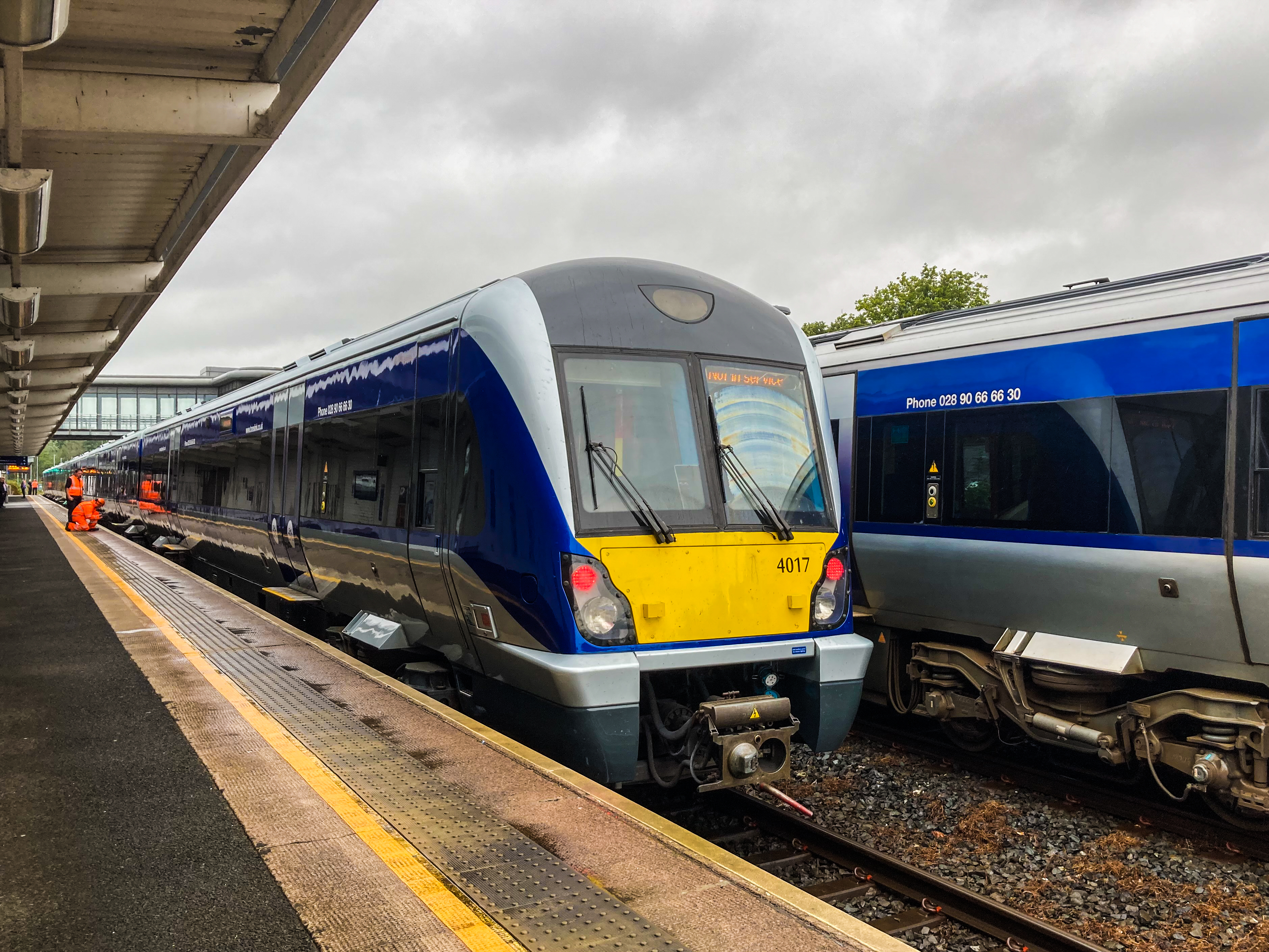
Extended train 4017 at Portadown.

In 2004/2005, NIR received 23 Class 3000 diesel multiple units from CAF of Spain in an £80 million order. The final unit, 3023, arrived in Belfast Harbour on Monday 18 July 2005. All units had entered service by 24 September 2005. A maintenance contract with CAF for these vehicles was extended in May 2020 for another 15 years.

In 2007, NIR announced plans to purchase up to 20 trains under its "New Trains 2010" proposal following the confirmation of its expected budget. This fleet replaced the remaining Class 80 and Class 450 trains by March 2012. Renamed as "New Trains Two", this project went out to tender in late 2007. In March 2009 it was announced that CAF had been selected to build the new fleet, named Class 4000. The first units were delivered in March 2011, with entry into service in September 2011

In December 2018, NIR, announced that 21 additional carriages would be purchased from CAF at the cost of £50 million, via an option in the existing Class 4000 train procurement contract. The first of the new carriages arrived in Belfast in March 2021, they were integrated onto Unit 4017 and tested throughout the summer, until being put into service on 29 September 2021.

=== Past fleet ===
Class	Image	Type	Built	Withdrawn	Notes
Class Z		Steam locomotive	1949	1969	Ex-SLNCR Lough class. No. 49 Lough Erne preserved at the Railway Preservation Society of Ireland.
Class WT		Steam locomotive	1946–1950	1969–1971	2-6-4 tank engines nicknamed "Jeeps" due to their general purpose traffic ability. Used for Spoil trains from Magheramorne to shores of Belfast Lough as well as shunting, passenger and freight. Arguably the last steam locomotives in mainline operation in Ireland and the British Isles. No. 4 preserved at the Railway Preservation Society of Ireland.
Class 1		Diesel locomotive	1969	1989	Shunters. Since withdrawal two have been rebuilt for work in Sri Lanka; one is in storage in Wales.
101 Class		Diesel locomotive	1970	2002	Intended for loco hauled Enterprise services. One preserved at the Ulster Folk and Transport Museums
104 Class		Diesel locomotive	1956–1957	1997	Originally operated under CIÉ; six transferred to NIR in 1986. All scrapped.
AEC		Diesel multiple unit	1948–1950	1972	10 Inherited from the UTA. All scrapped.
BUT		Diesel multiple unit	1956–1958	1975–1980	Nine vehicles converted to hauled stock over the 1970s, these lasted until 1980. All scrapped.
MED		Diesel multiple unit	1952–1954	1973–1978	Intended for local services around Belfast. All scrapped.
MPD		Diesel multiple unit	1957–1962	1981–1984	Intended for longer distance former NCC routes and Enterprise. All scrapped.
70 Class		Diesel multiple unit	1966–1968	1985–1986	Passenger DEMU. Engines recovered for use in 450 Class units. One intermediate is preserved at the Downpatrick and County Down Railway. One driving trailer was also preserved, but was destroyed.
80 Class		Diesel multiple unit	1974–1979	2011–2017	Passenger DEMU affectionately nicknamed 'Thumpers'. Operated on all routes. Also used for Sandite until 2017. Four cars preserved at the Downpatrick and County Down Railway and one at the East Lancashire Railway.
450 Class		Diesel multiple unit	1985–1987	2011–2012	Passenger DEMU nicknamed the Castle Class by enthusiasts. Power cars named after Northern Ireland castles. Initially designed for commuter or branch line traffic but could be found over the entire network. One example is preserved on the Downpatrick and County Down Railway.
RB3		Diesel railcar	1980	1990	Prototype built for British Rail; transferred to NIR in 1983. Preserved at the Gwendraeth Valley Railway.
Mark 2 'Gatwicks'		Passenger Carriage	1973	2009	Bought from Gatwick Express in 2001 and later used on the Belfast-Portadown route once a day until 2009.

== Routes ==
A map showing the modern extent of Northern Ireland's railway network

NIR maintains the following lines:

- Bangor Line. Commuter line running northeast from Belfast. Travels along the north Down coast to the seaside town of Bangor. The only remaining line from the historical Belfast & County Down Railway.
- Derry~Londonderry Line. The only inter-city line located entirely within Northern Ireland. Longest route by time and length. This line is sometimes referred to the Maiden City Flyer, joining the two main cities of Northern Ireland.
- Dublin Line. Inter-city line running south over the Irish border to Dublin. All services operate under the brand Enterprise. This service is operated in conjunction with Iarnród Éireann, who are responsible for the line south of the border.
- Larne Line. Commuter line running north from Belfast. Most of this line is coastal, with a terminus at Larne Harbour, allowing interchange with the ferry service to Cairnryan.
- Newry Line. Commuter line running southwest from Belfast. Travels through several urban centres in Counties Down and Armagh.
- Portrush Line. A generally-rural branch line connecting the Causeway coast towns of Coleraine and Portrush. The shortest line on the NIR network, with only four stations, and the only line not to enter Belfast.
- Lisburn–Antrim line. The former route for Derry~Londonderry Line trains south of Antrim between 1976 and 2001. Currently mothballed, with no scheduled passenger service operating since 2003. Has rarely been used as a diversion for Derry~Londonderry Line trains. A study is now underway to understand the feasibility of reopening the track with a link to Belfast International Airport.

The track from Grand Central to Lanyon Place is shared by the Bangor, Derry~Londonderry and Larne lines. Beyond this, the Derry~Londonderry and Larne lines share track as far as Bleach Green. On the other side of the city, the track from Grand Central to Newry is shared between the Dublin and Newry lines. The Portrush Line shares a small amount of track with the Derry~Londonderry Line at Coleraine.

Signalling is controlled from Coleraine (Coleraine to Portrush), Portadown (the border to Lisburn), and Belfast Lanyon Place (From Lisburn to Belfast and the rest of the network).

=== Services ===
NIR operates regular passenger trains along the following routes during the weekday inter-peak:

Northern Ireland Railways
Route	tph	Calling at
Belfast – Bangor	2	City Hospital, Botanic, Belfast Lanyon Place, Titanic Quarter, Sydenham, Holywood, Marino, Cultra, Seahill, Helen's Bay, Carnalea, Bangor West
Belfast – Derry~Londonderry	1	City Hospital, Botanic, Belfast Lanyon Place, York Street, Whiteabbey (limited), Mossley West, Antrim, Ballymena, Cullybackey, Ballymoney, Coleraine, Castlerock, Bellarena
Belfast – Portadown and Newry	2	Adelaide, Balmoral, Finaghy, Dunmurry, Derriaghy, Lambeg, Hilden, Lisburn, Moira, Lurgan; 4tpd extended from/to Newry, calling at; Portadown, Scarva, Poyntzpass
Belfast – Whitehead and Larne Harbour	2	City Hospital, Botanic, Belfast Lanyon Place, York Street, Whiteabbey, Jordanstown, Greenisland, Trooperslane, Clipperstown, Carrickfergus, Downshire; 1tph extended to/from Larne Harbour, calling at; Ballycarry, Magheramorne, Glynn, Larne Town
Coleraine – Portrush	1	University, Dhu Varren
Enterprise
Route	tph	Calling at
Belfast – Dublin Connolly	1	Portadown, Newry, Dundalk Clarke, Drogheda MacBride; 1 Train on a Sunday in both directions also calls at Lisburn and Lurgan; Services operated jointly with Iarnród Éireann

=== Suspended routes ===
Following the re-opening of the 15-mile (24 km) Antrim – Bleach Green line in June 2001, which had been closed since 1978, NIR ceased passenger operations between Lisburn and Antrim on 29 June 2003. Combined with the new Dargan Bridge across the River Lagan in Belfast, the Bleach Green route offered faster journeys between Derry, Coleraine, Ballymena, Antrim and Belfast.

The Lisburn-Antrim railway line is still maintained, and occasional crew training operations are performed. While it is also available as a diversionary route, Knockmore, Ballinderry, Glenavy, and Crumlin stations remain closed to the public. The passing loops at Ballinderry and Crumlin have been removed.

== Future ==
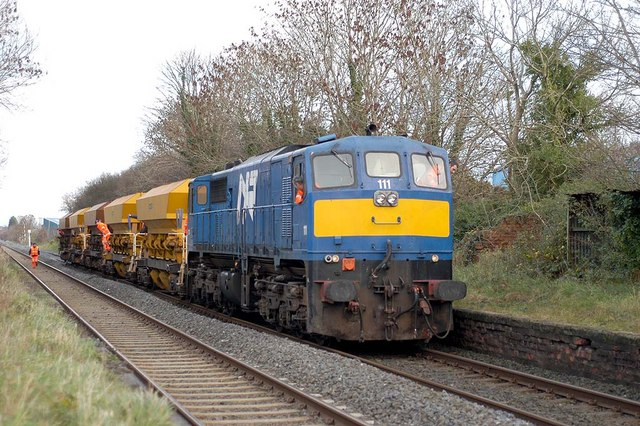
Track ballasting on the NIR system.

The development of railways in Northern Ireland has been linked to the future economic growth of the region, and as a way of reducing road congestion. One of the major challenges that NIR has faced is the limited number of trains available for service at peak times. The limited fleet size has led to services being cancelled due to failures or delays. This can lead to widespread disruption across the network and potentially a huge loss in revenue. Upon its establishment in 1998, the Northern Ireland Assembly put in place an investment programme costing £100 million to bring about major improvements. This saw projects including the purchase of the 3000 Class trains, the complete relaying of the Belfast-Larne line and the construction of a new maintenance depot. Following completion of this, as part of its long-term investment programme for NIR Translink conducted a "Strategic Rail Review" in 2004, an independent review of rail services to determine its funding request under the Comprehensive Spending Review. This report determined that so-called "lesser used lines" were an important and economically viable part of the total network, and that investment should be consistent rather than in the "stop-go" manner of previous years.

A debate in the Northern Ireland Assembly on Monday 14 May 2007 raised several proposals as to how the railway network could be improved:

- Reopening of existing but closed infrastructure, notably the Lisburn-Antrim line
- Improvement of the infrastructure on the Belfast-Derry~Londonderry line through, at the very least, the installation of passing loops to allow service frequency to be increased, and upgrading the track to allow higher speeds.

Pressure groups have advocated the protection of former routes, where the track has been lifted but the trackbed remains intact, to enable these to be reinstated for commuter traffic as an alternative to increased road building.

In October 2007, following the CSR that provided funding allocation to the Northern Ireland Executive, the Department for Regional Development announced its draft budget. Conor Murphy, the Regional Development Minister, stated that approximately £137 million could be allocated from for investment in the railways for the period 2008–2011.

In June 2008, Brian Guckian, an independent transport researcher from Dublin, presented a wide-ranging proposal to Translink for a £460 million expansion of the network called Northern Ireland Network Enhancement (NINE). This proposes the return of the network to several towns that have not had access to rail services for many years; the main part of the proposal would see the Derry~Londonderry-Portadown line re-opened, which would link Omagh, Strabane and Dungannon, with branches to Enniskillen and Armagh. However, none of these enhancements are programmed to go to planning over the course of the next decade as of early 2013.

Translink have plans to introduce a new ticketing system in 2018 similar to the system utilised by Irish Rail. This includes the introduction of ticket vending machines, allowing customers to purchase tickets via an electronic interface at the station (as opposed to the current system in which customers must pay staff for the ticket, who in turn print the customer's ticket for them), a 'smart card' 'tap on, tap off' system similar to the Leap Card and contactless payments.

=== Infrastructure ===
Map of Northern Ireland's rail transport infrastructure, showing number of tracks and maximum speed. Due to poor infrastructure, trains are generally slower in Northern Ireland than in Great Britain or the Republic of Ireland.

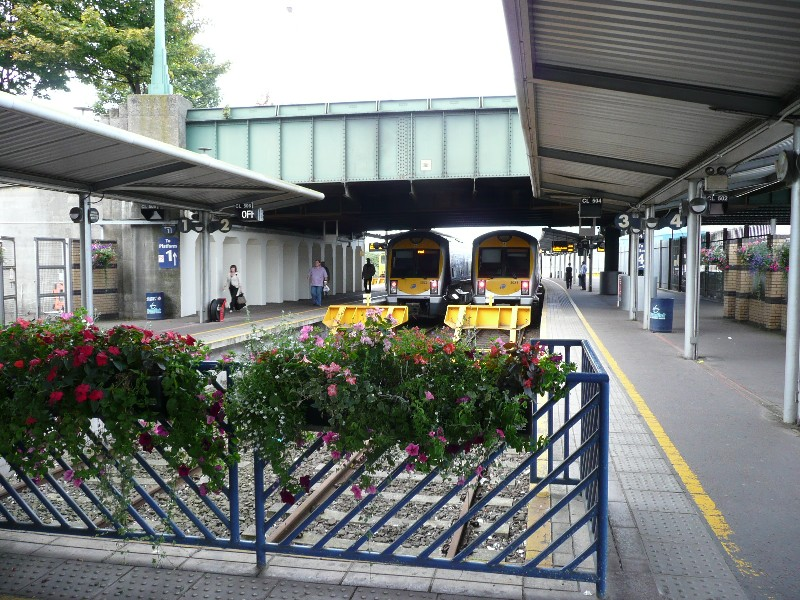
Class 3000 units at former station Great Victoria Street

The rail network is focused on Greater Belfast. Both the Bangor and Larne lines have been re-laid in recent years, enabling timetable improvements to be delivered. The only significant "inter-city" routes are the main line between Belfast and Dublin, which covers services to Newry; and the Belfast-Derry line. This line is single track with crossing loops north of Mossley West and single track only west of Castlerock, which limits the service in both frequency and speed; in the current timetable the train takes 2hr4m while the bus takes 1hr50m. The pressure group Into the West, which campaigns for improved rail links to the North West region, has stated that the need for a quality rail service, as part of a larger integrated transport policy, is vital to the economic development not just for the city of Derry but for the wider cross-border region.

On 21 November 2007, the Regional Development Minister announced that the investment strategy being considered by the NI Executive included the relaying of the Belfast-Londonderry line north of Coleraine, planned to include new signalling and a new crossing loop, allowing more trains. The total cost was £64 million, and began in 2011, lasting five years. Prior to the major relaying of the Coleraine-Londonderry section, £12 million was spent on improving the section between Ballymena and Coleraine. This saw the stretch between Ballymena and Coleraine closed completely for four months, with a replacement bus service. Trains continued to run between Derry~Londonderry, Coleraine and Portrush, with a small fleet stabled at Coleraine – four trains were stabled instead of the three previously reported. Once the project was completed in 2016, there is a further proposal to add two trains per day, enabling journey times between Belfast and Derry~Londonderry to be reduced by up to 30 minutes. As part of this plan, Translink envisages an hourly service to Derry~Londonderry, half-hourly to Ballymena. There have been proposals to improve the Belfast-Dublin line between Knockmore and Lurgan, enabling journey times to be reduced and frequency increased. This will improve NIR's services and allow an hourly Enterprise service to Dublin.

In May 2008, the Regional Development Minister announced that his department would commission a study, in conjunction with Donegal County Council, to investigate the effects a resurrection of railway services in the north-west of Ireland with a long-term projection of building a railway line connecting Derry~Londonderry with Sligo through County Donegal.

As part of NIR's original plans for its new rolling stock, it has built a new traincare depot next to Adelaide station on the site of the old freight yard. As a means of improving timings of its services, it would have seen former station Belfast Great Victoria Street undergo a major refurbishment that will see the platforms lengthened and the curves reduced, together with the addition of a new fifth platform, all planned to bring about the transfer of Enterprise services from Belfast Lanyon Place.

Further plans are afoot to double the track from Monkstown to Templepatrick, to further increase capacity on the Derry~Londonderry line.

==== Portadown to Armagh ====
In 2013, the then Minister for Regional Development, Danny Kennedy, indicated that a restoration of the route between Portadown and Armagh was under active consideration in the long term, pointing out the commercial opportunities for the city of Armagh and its hinterland to be reconnected to the railway network.

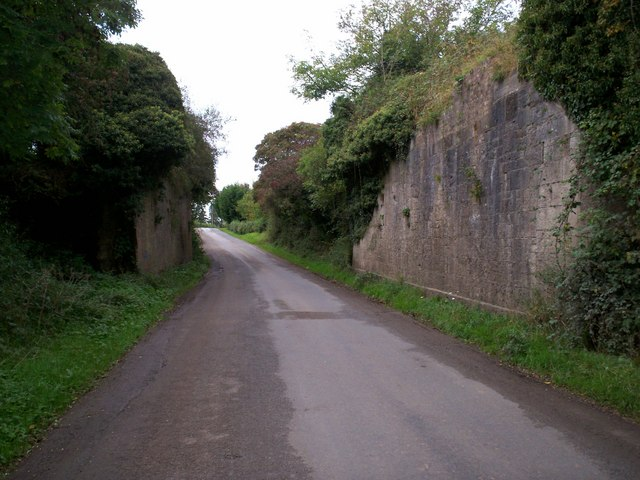
Remains of an old railway bridge, Ballybrannon Road, Armagh awaiting reconstruction.

==== Airport links ====
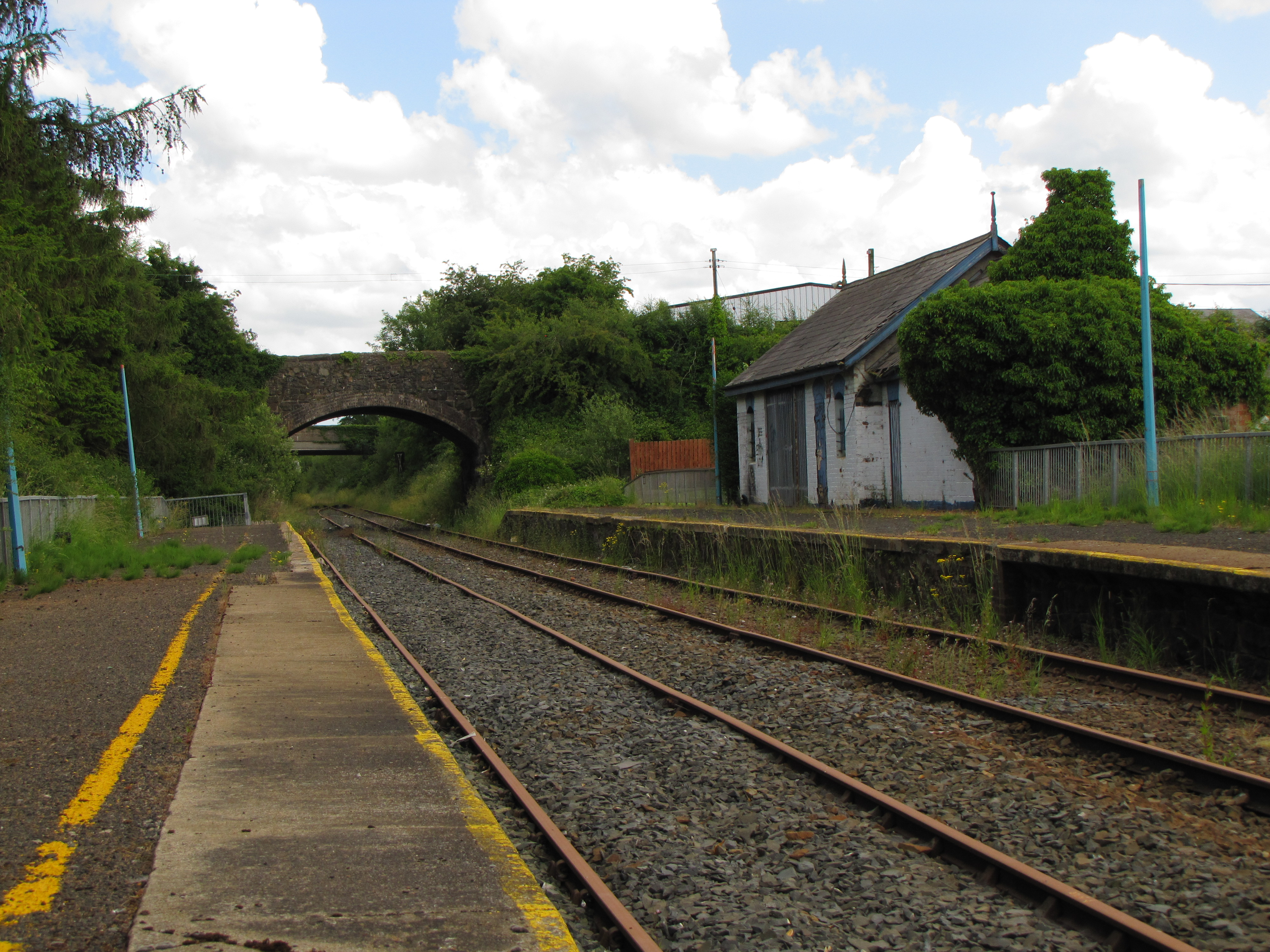
Ballinderry on the disused Lisburn-Antrim line

Speculation remains that the Lisburn-Antrim route could re-open, potentially to offer an alternative Antrim – Lisburn – Belfast service. The line is maintained both for crew training and as a diversionary route, and passes close to Belfast International Airport at Aldergrove. For a number of years there have been suggestions for a station to serve the airport. The airport has marked the building of a new station in its list of future plans, while EasyJet, which is the largest operator into Belfast International, have been strong in advocating an airport rail link. The reopening of the Lisburn-Antrim line is seen not simply in terms of provision of a link to the airport – it would also allow for the further economic development of the area, which has seen increases in population as people use the towns in South Antrim as dormitory settlements for Belfast. In May 2009, the Minister for Regional Development stated that a proposal had been received from a private developer, the Kilbride Group, to restore the Knockmore line, indicating that he would be prepared to part fund a study into this if the local authorities provided the rest of the funding. The route was also included in a wider study of the development of the Northern Rail Corridor published at the end of 2009

The Belfast Metropolitan Area Plan 2015 identifies the need to improve transport links to George Best Belfast City Airport from the city centre. The BMAP proposed a light rail line from the city centre that would have interchanged with a new railway station at Tillysburn, serving both the airport and the Holywood Exchange retail development. However, in April 2008 the decision was taken not to proceed with the light rail project, with the DRD choosing to implement a new bus-based network. The pressure group Rail 21 has stated that the Tillysburn proposal is insufficient for what the new station is expected to provide – a link to the airport, transport provision for Holywood Exchange and a park and ride facility. Instead it proposes a dedicated airport station, similar to Glasgow Prestwick Airport, connected directly to the terminal, with Tillysburn half a mile away serving Holywood Exchange, instead of Tillysburn providing the link to the airport.

There have also been calls, as part of the wider upgrade of the rail route to Derry, for a railway station connecting to City of Derry Airport, which is close to the railway line. However, the Government has determined that the number of passengers using the airport is not sufficient to justify a station.

=== Rolling stock ===
Although the introduction of the Class 3000 trains was a success, they were a like-for-like replacement for the Class 80 units rather than an expansion of the fleet. Due to the limited number of new units, some of NIR's older rolling stock was retained, notably the entire Class 450 on the Belfast-Larne route. To enable NIR to maintain its levels of service, it upgraded some of its older rolling stock. In 2005, the Class 450 fleet was refurbished to a standard close to that of the Class 3000 units, which saw them through to their withdrawal in 2012. Three four-car Class 80 units were refurbished and a number of locomotives and coaches were converted to push-pull operation with the addition of the DBSO obtained from 'one', to ensure that passenger rolling stock levels were maintained up to the introduction of new rolling stock in 2011 and 2012.

One of the major projects instigated by Translink was "New Trains Two" (formerly "New Trains 2010"), which saw the purchase of a new batch of rolling stock. At minimum, this was to be like-for-like replacement of the Class 450 trains, which were withdrawn in 2012. However, it was determined that to deliver improved frequency of service on the network the size of NIR's fleet had to be increased, and with that must come associated infrastructure improvements. The announcement of the investment programme confirmed "New Trains 2010", which procured 20 new trains to both replace the remaining Class 80 and Class 450 units and provide additional capacity. The specification given by the DRD stated that the new trains are to provide both inner and outer suburban commuter services and express services between Belfast and Dublin. The Class 4000 fleet entered service on Thursday 29 September 2011. Twenty three-car units have been specified with an option to purchase an additional 20 vehicles, allowing the units to be lengthened to six cars.

In 2021, following the procurement of 21 additional vehicles purchased to extend a number of its Class 4000 units to six-cars, Translink published a new strategy indicating its intention to provide a zero emission service by 2040. As part of this, NI Railways will begin a process to purchase new rolling stock from 2026 to 2027. The intention is to procure or part procure two fleets - a total of 15 three-car units planned to be either bi-mode or tri-mode for NI Railways' own domestic services, and a fleet of 9 eight-car sets for use by Enterprise, the business case for which will be based on zero- or low-carbon technologies.

== See also ==
- Rail transport in Ireland
- History of rail transport in Ireland
