= Lisburn railway station =

Railway station in Lisburn, Northern Ireland

Lisburn
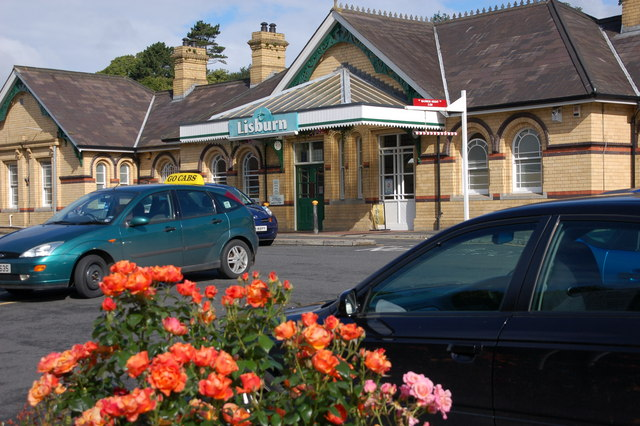
- Lisburn Station entrance on 7 July 2007

General information
- Location: Lisburn; Northern Ireland
- Coordinates: 54.514054°N 6.045811°W
- System: InterCity Rail & Commuter Rail
- Owner: NI Railways
- Operator: NI Railways
- Line: Dublin–Belfast
- Platforms: 3
- Tracks: 4
- Train operators: NI Railways, Iarnród Éireann
- Bus routes: 23a; 51a; 103; 103b; 109; 109a; 325a; 325c; 325d; 325i; 325j; 325k; 523; 525; 538; 551; 551a
- Bus stands: 1
- Bus operators: Ulsterbus

Construction
- Structure type: At-grade

Other information
- Station code: NIR: LB; IÉ: LBURN
- Fare zone: iLink Zone 2

Key dates
- 1839: Opened

Passengers
- 2015/16: 1,255,207
- 2016/17: ▲1,322,012
- 2017/18: ▲1,347,006
- 2018/19: ▲1,422,732
- 2019/20: ▼1,320,623
- 2020/21: ▼275,536
- 2021/22: ▲738,788
- 2022/23: ▲1.069 million
- 2023/24: ▲1.307 million
- 2024/25: ▼1.212 million
- 2025/26: ▲1.436 million

Services
Preceding station	NI Railways	Following station
Terminus	Portadown Line	Hilden towards Belfast Grand Central
Moira towards Portadown or Newry	Portadown Line	Hilden towards Belfast Grand Central
Moira towards Portadown or Newry	Portadown Line Express services	Belfast Grand Central Terminus
Lurgan towards Dublin Connolly	Enterprise Sundays only	Belfast Grand Central Terminus

Disused railways
Preceding station	Disused railways	Following station
Knockmore; Station closed	NI Railways; Belfast–Derry via Lisburn–Antrim line	Hilden; Line and station open

Historical railways
Preceding station	Historical railways	Following station
Moira; Line and station open	Ulster Railway; Belfast–Portadown	Dunmurry; Line and station open
The Damhead; Line open, station closed	Great Northern Railway (Ireland); Belfast–Portadown	Hilden; Line and station open
- NI Railways; Translink; NI railway stations
Route map
(Click to expand)
Location
- Location within Northern Ireland Location within island of Ireland

Lisburn railway station serves the city of Lisburn in County Antrim, Northern Ireland.

== History ==
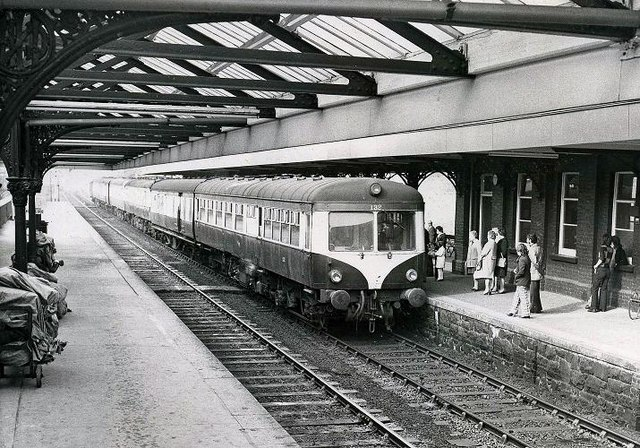
The station in 1974

The station was opened on 12 August 1839 by the Ulster Railway. The station buildings were rebuilt in 1878 to designed by William Henry Mills, for the then newly formed Great Northern Railway of Ireland (GNRI).

The Northern Ireland Digital Film Archive holds a black and white film clip, dating from 1897, which was filmed from a moving train going through Lisburn Railway Station from Belfast to Kingstown (now Dún Laoghaire), Dublin. In addition to the station's name, the footage includes the platform, train carriages, station buildings and houses along the length of North Circular Road in Lisburn.

On Wednesday 20 December 1978, there was a fatal collision between two trains. The fire brigade attended and cut out the person killed from the wreckage. Several other people were treated for minor injuries and shock.

== Current building ==
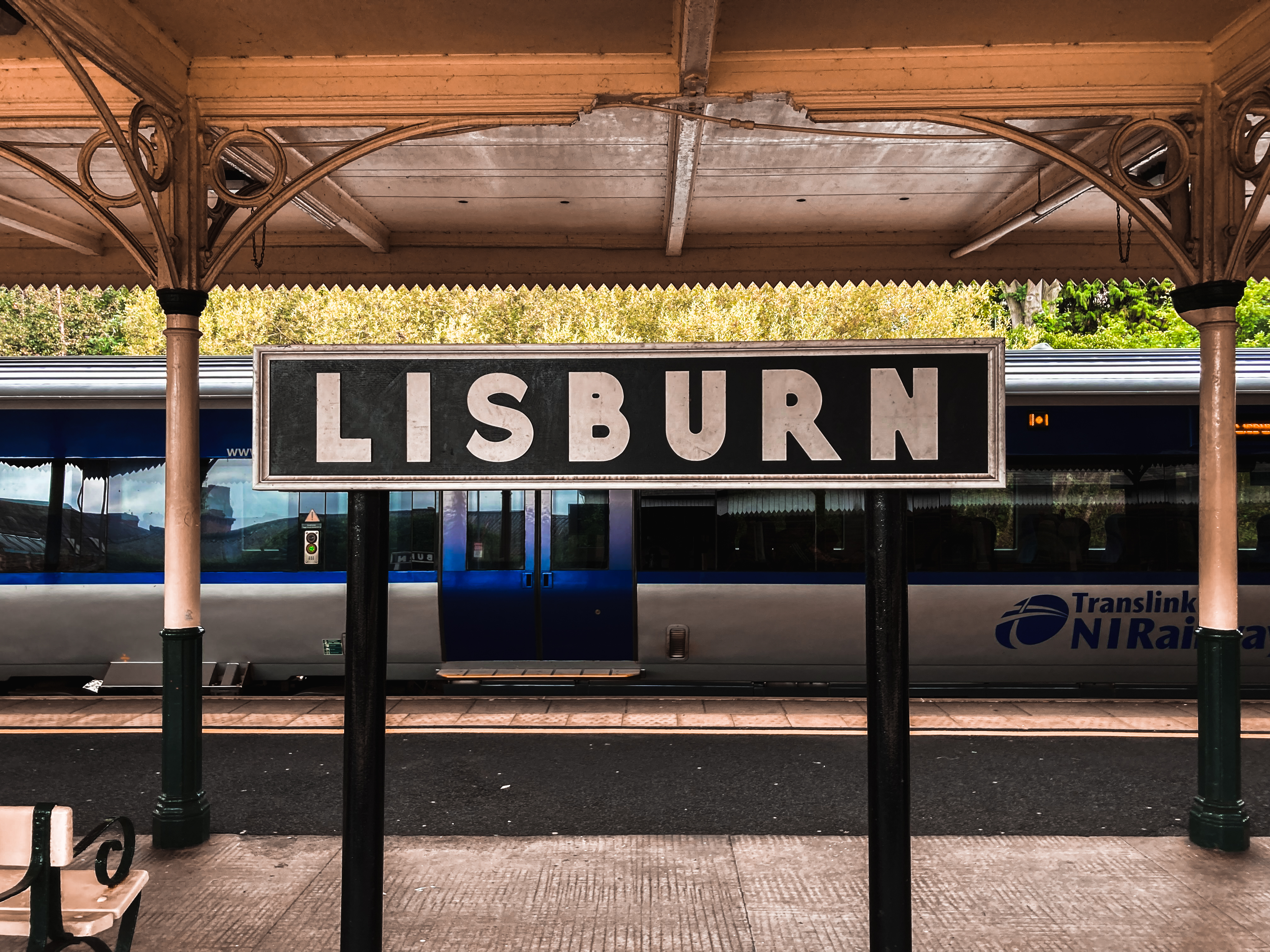
Lisburn Station platform sign

It has been renovated, with a new waiting area on platform 1, new toilets and vending machines. In addition, on platforms 2 and 3, a coffee shop operates on weekday mornings, to accommodate commuters travelling towards Belfast Grand Central. To make the station more accessible, lifts have been installed on each platform.

== Station house ==
There is a station house built in Great Northern Railway of Ireland (GNR) style. It is now in private ownership.

== Services ==
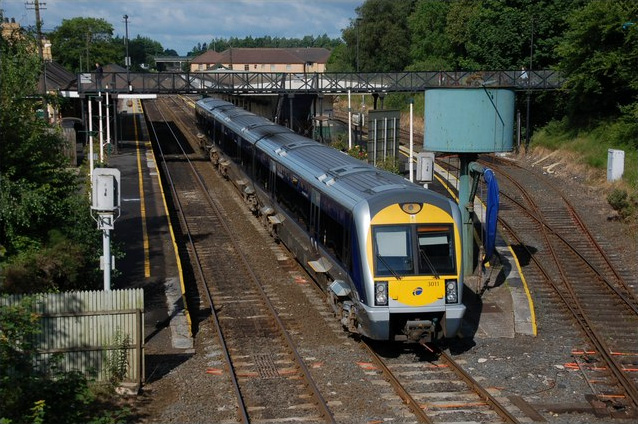
A NIR Class 3000 'C3K' departs Lisburn

=== Train services ===
Mondays to Saturdays, there is a half-hourly service towards Portadown or Newry in one direction, and to Grand Central in the other. Extra services run at peak times, some as expresses to Grand Central, and the service reduces to hourly operation in the evenings.

On Sundays, there is an hourly NIR service in each direction.

Two Enterprise services call at the station on Sundays only - the 0818 to Dublin Connolly, and the 2256 to Grand Central.

=== Bus services ===
Buses depart from the road outside the station entrance. This stop is served by Ulsterbus, which provides routes to locations such as Belfast, Lisburn City Centre, and Derriaghy.

== Former services ==
Until 2003, Lisburn was also a stop on the Belfast-Derry railway line. However, in 2001, the Bleach Green route (via Mossley and Templepatrick) was re-opened, after being closed in 1978. This provided a faster route for Derry~Londonderry Line trains than the Lisburn-Antrim line. A skeleton service was operated on this line until 2003 when passenger services were withdrawn. The other reason the line was cut was because of the congestion on the route, which caused problems with the Enterprise Service for over 20 years. The line itself is still maintained for rolling stock transfers and emergency diversions.

=== Former lines ===
The Ulster Railway brought trains from Belfast Great Victoria Street railway station to Portadown and Armagh railway station in Armagh. Later the Great Northern Railway of Ireland had a much more extensive system with trains to Omagh, Enniskillen, Bundoran, Strabane and Derry being linked, which in the 1950s and 1960s was closed west of Portadown.

== See also ==
- Lisburn West railway station
