= Belfast Grand Central station =

Rail and bus station in Belfast

Belfast Grand Central Mórstáisiún Lárnach Bhéal Feirste
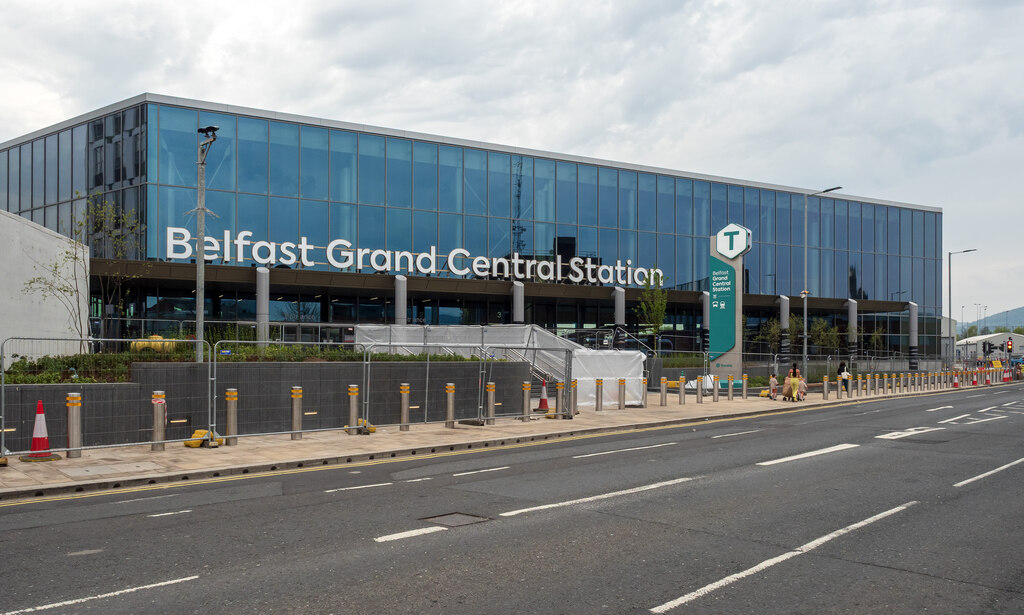
- The Grosvenor Road entrance to the station in April 2025.

General information
- Other names: Belfast Transport Hub (project name)
- Location: 90–92 Grosvenor Road; Belfast; BT12 5AX; Belfast; Northern Ireland
- Coordinates: 54.59469°N 5.93918°W
- Grid position: J 3325 7378
- System: Transport interchange (rail and bus)
- Owner: Northern Ireland Transport Holding Company
- Operator: Translink
- Lines: Bangor Line Derry ~ Londonderry Line; Dublin–Belfast Larne Line
- Distance: Dublin Connolly: approx. 112 miles 44 chains (181.1 km), using the former Great Victoria Street datum as a proxy
- Platforms: 8
- Tracks: 8
- Train operators: NI Railways; Iarnród Éireann (cross-border services)
- Bus routes: X1; X2; X212; X261; X273; 13; 13a; 22; 23; 24; 103; 109; 209; 209b; 210; 212; 215; 237; 238/b; 246; 250; 250b; 251; 261/c/d/u; 270; 271; 273b; 290q; 300/a; 513; 515; 516; 518; 520; 522; 523; 524; 525; 530; 536; 538; 551; 600; 646/a; 650; 651; 652; 705X; 785; 923; ER1; HN1
- Bus stands: 26
- Bus operators: Ulsterbus; Goldline; Metro; Dublin Express; AirCoach; Eamonn Rooney; Hannon Coach; Scottish Citylink
- Connections: Rail; Bus; Taxi; Cycle

Construction
- Structure type: At-grade
- Parking: Nearby: Great Northern Car Park (530 spaces); Value Car Parks, Grosvenor Road (575 spaces)
- Cycle facilities: 200+ spaces
- Accessible: Yes – step-free interchange; tactile routes between entrances, platforms, bus stands and ticket machines; accessible and Changing Places toilets; hearing loops and staff assistance
- Architect: John McAslan + Partners

Other information
- Station code: GC
- Fare zone: iLink Zone 1
- Website: Translink station guide

Key dates
- 18 March 2022: Main construction phase launched
- 8 September 2024: Bus operations commenced
- 13 October 2024: Rail operations commenced

Passengers
- 2024/25 (partial): 3,069,939
- 2025/26: 6.978 million

Services
Preceding station	NI Railways	Following station
City Hospital towards Bangor	Bangor Line	Terminus
City Hospital towards Carrickfergus, Whitehead, Larne Town or Larne Harbour	Larne Line	Terminus
City Hospital towards Coleraine, Portrush or Derry~Londonderry	Derry ~ Londonderry Line	Terminus
Adelaide towards Lisburn, Portadown or Newry	Portadown Line	Terminus
Lisburn towards Portadown or Newry	Portadown Line	Terminus
Portadown towards Dublin Connolly	Enterprise	Terminus
Lisburn Sundays only towards Dublin Connolly	Enterprise	Terminus

Historical railway on site
Preceding station	Great Northern Railway (Ireland)	Following station
Central Junction	Great Northern Railway (Ireland); Grosvenor Road Goods Branch	Grosvenor Road Goods Yard
- NI Railways; Translink; NI railway stations
Route map
(Click to expand)
Location
- Location within Northern Ireland Location within island of Ireland
- Location in Belfast
Notes
- Passenger figures below are Translink rail-station footfall counts rather than accredited passenger-journey statistics. NISRA notes that station footfall is an operational measure with potential for double-counting. The 2024/25 figure is partial because rail services at Grand Central began on 13 October 2024.

Belfast Grand Central station (Irish: Mórstáisiún Lárnach Bhéal Feirste) is an integrated railway and bus station in the city centre of Belfast, Northern Ireland. It is the biggest public transport station on the island of Ireland. Belfast Grand Central replaced Great Victoria Street railway station and the Europa Buscentre. It is built next to its predecessors, in a new neighbourhood called Weaver's Cross. The first bus service, to Dublin, departed from the station on 8 September 2024, and the first rail service, also to Dublin, departed from the station on 13 October 2024.

== Context ==
The first railway station in Ulster was opened on the site of the former Great Victoria Street station in 1839 on the Ulster Railway. It became the northern terminus of the GNR's non-stop Dublin–Belfast express in 1947, and in 1962, platform 5 was removed to allow construction of a bus station providing a truly integrated bus-rail station for the first time in Belfast's history. Northern Ireland Railways (NIR) closed the railway part of the station altogether in 1976 and the original buildings were demolished, being replaced by the Europa Hotel and Great Northern Mall. Railway services resumed, however, in 1995 with the opening of a rebuilt Great Victoria Street station, integrated with the Europa Buscentre.

== Station location and facilities ==
The station is located on a 8-hectare (860,000 sq ft) site owned by The Northern Ireland Transport Holding Company (trading as Translink) between the former Europa Buscentre and Belfast Great Victoria Street railway station, both of which it replaces. The station's capacity is designed to cater for twenty million passenger journeys annually, more than the twelve million combined capacity of the pre-existing bus and railway station. In addition to rail and bus improvements, the station also has cycle and taxi provision for enhanced connectivity, with 300 cycle parking spaces. It is said to be the "largest integrated transport facility on the island of Ireland". During construction the transport hub was described as one of the Northern Ireland Executive's "flagship projects".

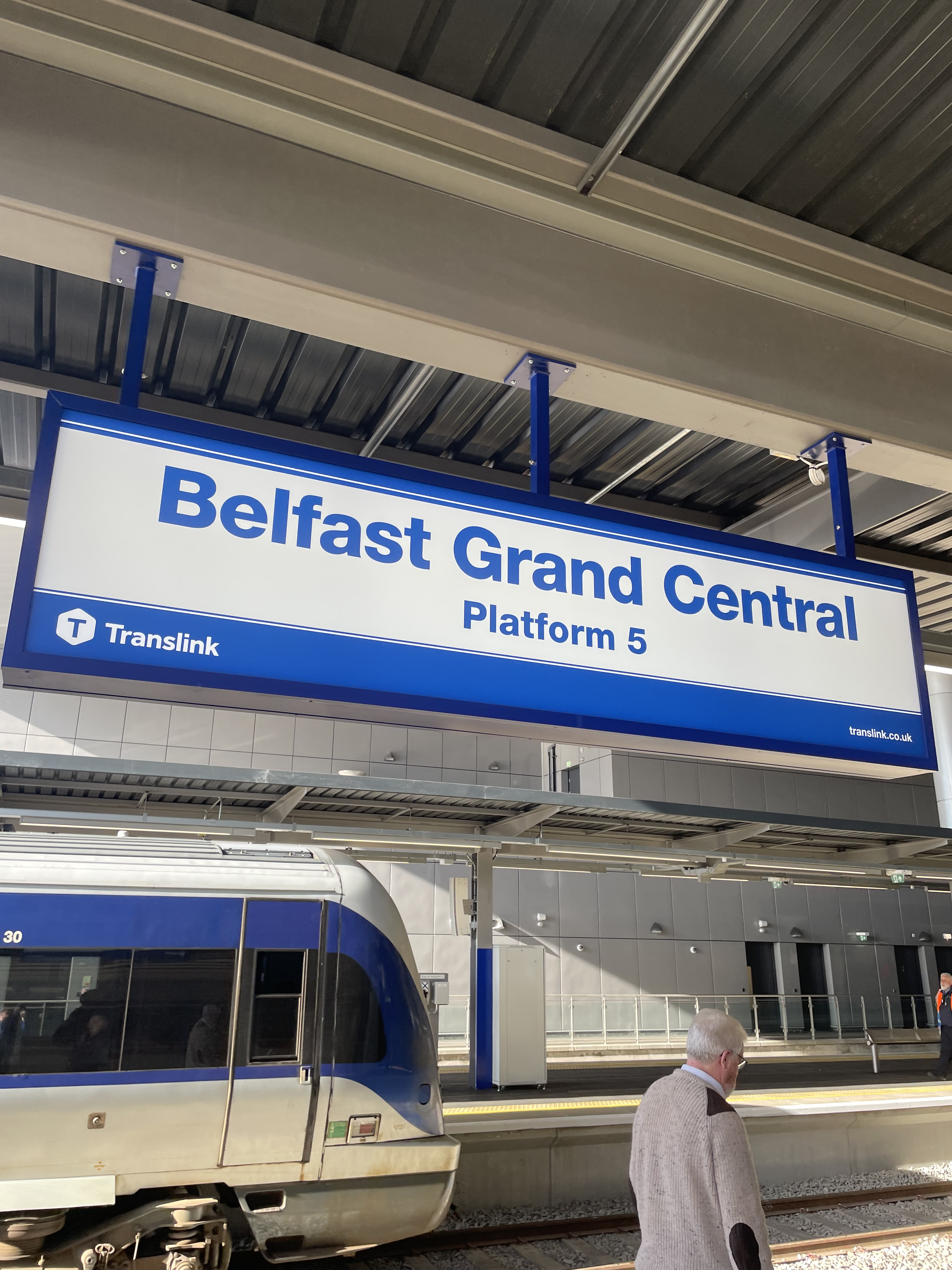
A platform sign at Belfast Grand Central Station

=== Trains ===
The station has eight terminus platforms (double that of Great Victoria Street), composed of four island platforms with two faces each. Platforms 1–4 are 154 m long (accommodating up to a six car train), while platforms 5–8 are 224 m long (up to 9 cars). Trains to Derry, Larne and Bangor usually use 1–4 and trains to Dublin and Portadown/Newry typically use 5–8. Portadown to Bangor traffic is divided into two separate lines, whereas at the former station it had operated as a single line. The Enterprise express service to Dublin was moved from Lanyon Place as part of the project.

=== Buses ===
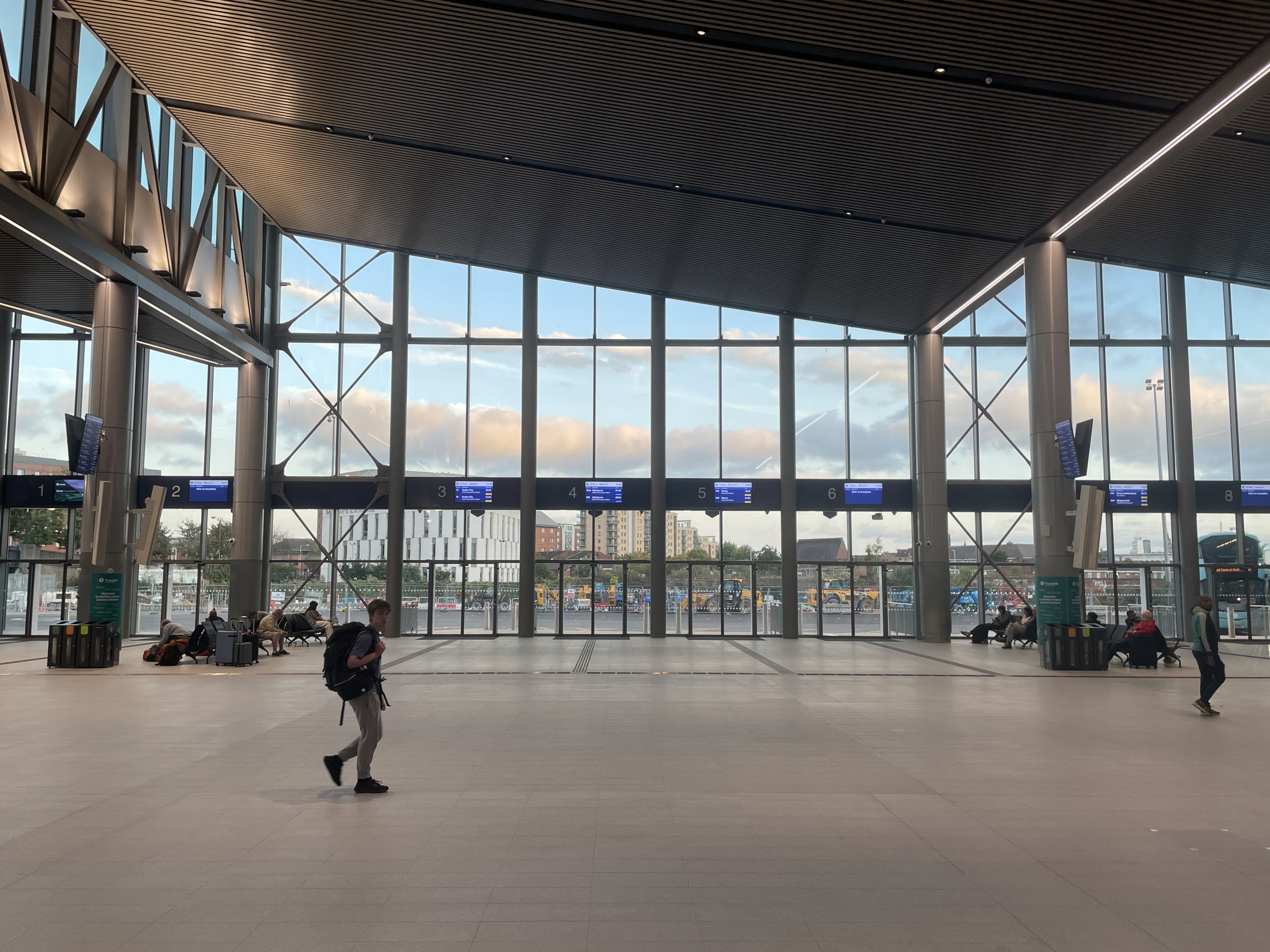
A look towards the bus stands within Belfast Grand Central Station on opening day 2024

The bus station features 26 stands, eight more than the previous Europa Buscentre. Seating is available throughout, with priority seating at select stands. The station also offers a range of amenities, including ATMs, vending machines, automated ticket machines, a help desk, a water refill station, and a sensory pod. There are accessible male and female restrooms, as well as Changing Places facilities.

=== Weaver's Cross and Station Quarter ===
The area surrounding the hub will become a new neighbourhood which Translink has named 'Weaver's Cross'. This 100,000 m^{2} site is planned to comprise leisure, residential and commercial facilities.

Weaver's Cross, combined with the station and a rejuvenated Glengall Street, Hope Street and Durham Street, will become Station Quarter, Belfast's ninth cultural quarter.

== History ==
During its planning and construction, the station was called the Belfast Transport Hub.

=== Construction ===
By February 2021, the first stage of enabling works was completed by construction contractor company Graham Construction, clearing the 8-hectare (860,000 sq ft) for construction. The next stage of development, from February 2021, involved the relocating of bus engineering and operation facilities to new accommodation, and the construction of a new bus wash facility, engineering garage, storage facilities and a bus parking area. The Main Works and Infrastructure Enhancement phases of the project were expected to be conducted in 2022, with the project due for completion in 2024/2025. The project was said to potentially create 400 jobs over a five-year period.

The main works of the project were delivered by a joint venture of Farrans Construction and Sacyr, with railway system works by Babcock. The project was designed by John McAslan + Partners with Arup Group and Juno. The Busway Bridge was completed in August 2023.

In April 2024, it was announced that Great Victoria Street station would close permanently on 10 May 2024, several months before the new Grand Central station was scheduled to open in autumn 2024.

On 29 May 2024, the first "The Grand Connection Roadshow" was held at Lanyon Place train station to communicate plans for the facility. The roadshow toured various locations throughout Northern Ireland, including shopping centres and train and bus stations.

On 3 July 2024, Translink closed the rail line between Lisburn and Belfast Lanyon Place to facilitate the Grand Central enabling works scheduled for the summer. All stations between these two points were closed, with a temporary shuttle service running between Portadown and Lisburn. Enterprise passengers traveling to/from Belfast took a bus to/from Newry train station.

On 8 July 2024, Translink launched a series of 11 videos across all its social media channels titled "The Grand Connection: Behind the Scenes at Belfast Grand Central Station." These videos showcased the progress made since the closure of Great Victoria Street station in May and highlighted how stakeholders and interest groups contributed to the station's development.

On 13 August 2024, the first trains began arriving at the station for driver training runs. A NIR 4000 Class train operated these runs between Belfast Lanyon Place and Belfast Grand Central and Adelaide Depot.

On 19 August 2024, Translink announced that bus operations at Belfast Grand Central would commence on Sunday, 8 September 2024. The final day of operations at the Europa Buscentre was to be Saturday, 7 September 2024. The new station's first departure would be the X1 Goldliner bus service to Dublin Busáras, scheduled for 8 September 2024 at 05:00.

=== Opening ===
On 8 September 2024, Belfast Grand Central welcomed its first bus passengers, with services to Dublin Busáras via Dublin Airport and Belfast International Airport. The former Europa Buscentre was converted into a corridor connecting Belfast Grand Central to Great Victoria Street.

On 23 September 2024, the cross-border Enterprise service began trial runs at the new station, in advance of its relocation from Belfast Lanyon Place.

On 3 October 2024, Translink announced that train services at Belfast Grand Central Station would commence on 13 October 2024, which marked the reopening of the Belfast to Lisburn Line.

Rail services began operating from the station on Sunday, 13 October 2024. The first departure was the 08:05 Enterprise service to Dublin Connolly, with a once-a-week stop at Lisburn and Lurgan, continuing on to Portadown, Newry, Dundalk Clarke, Drogheda MacBride, and finally, Dublin Connolly. The first arrival was the 09:15 Translink NI Railways service from Portadown. On board this train was the Minister for Infrastructure, John O'Dowd. Also present at the commencement of services was Translink's CEO, Chris Conway. The first 2000 passengers to use the station received a commemorative ticket.

== Controversies ==
=== Boyne Bridge removal ===
The planning permission, granted in 2019 for the construction of the new Belfast Transport Hub, included provision for the removal of the Boyne Bridge. Demolition began in late 2024 and, following a temporary halt in January 2025 over planning concerns, was completed in February 2025. The bridge was replaced by a new road layout and Saltwater Square, a public plaza and event space outside Belfast Grand Central station. Elements of the 1936 bridge were retained and incorporated into the Reflections sculpture, unveiled in May 2026.

Some residents from the Sandy Row district, which lies at the southern end of the Boyne Bridge, as well as architectural and heritage campaigners, opposed the decision to dismantle the bridge on grounds of pedestrian safety and of the "bleakness" of architecture of the proposed Saltwater Square and also because of the bridge's place in the history of Belfast's development. The Sandy Row end of the Boyne Bridge contains remnants of a bridge built in 1642; this was originally named the Great Bridge and later renamed the Saltwater Bridge, which is believed to have been crossed by King William of Orange as he passed through Belfast on his way to the Battle of the Boyne in 1690.

=== Irish language signage ===
The absence of Irish language signage was criticised by Irish language campaigners, with Ciarán Mac Giolla Bhéin from An Dream Dearg stating, "This is not just a transport hub for Belfast; it serves people from across the entire island of Ireland. It's crucial that it reflects our identity as a city." A Translink spokesperson responded: "Translink is continuing to engage with all interested parties regarding multi-lingual signage at Belfast Grand Central Station for the official opening in the autumn of 2025." On 12 September, an Irish language protest took place at Grand Central Station, with a large An Dream Dearg banner displayed across the station floor.

In March 2025, Infrastructure Minister Liz Kimmins announced that bilingual signage, including Irish, would be installed at the station later in the year. She emphasized the importance of reflecting the culture and identity of all citizens across the island of Ireland. The signage will include wayfinding, passenger information, safety, and welcome signs, with an estimated cost of £150,000. While the decision was welcomed by Irish language advocates, it faced criticism from some, including TUV MLA Timothy Gaston, who questioned the consultation process and described the move as culturally divisive in a predominantly Loyalist area of Belfast. Minister Kimmins, however, reaffirmed her commitment to promoting inclusivity and equality, stating that the Irish language is for everyone and is a thriving part of Belfast's culture.

However, in April 2025, it was revealed that work to install the Irish language signage would not proceed for at least six months. Loyalist activist Jamie Bryson sought judicial review of the decision by Minister Kimmins, arguing that she had unlawfully breached the ministerial code by failing to refer the decision to the full Stormont Executive. On 9 May 2025, the High Court granted Bryson leave to seek a full judicial review, finding that he had established an arguable case that the decision was sufficiently controversial to require Executive approval. The case was initially listed for a full hearing in September 2025.

The case was subsequently delayed due to its overlap with separate legal proceedings concerning the Executive's failure to implement an Irish language strategy. A full hearing was initially expected in May 2026, before substantive arguments in the Grand Central Station case were heard in the High Court on 4 and 5 June 2026. During the hearing, the court was told that the eventual cost of implementing bilingual signage across the station could potentially reach several million pounds, substantially higher than the original estimate of approximately £150,000. The Department for Infrastructure defended the decision and maintained that the introduction of Irish-language signage was consistent with its equality and language obligations. Further hearings in the judicial review were scheduled for September 2026, with no final judgment having been delivered as of August 2026.

Separately, the Department for Infrastructure carried out a further equality screening of the proposal in October 2025, concluding that a full equality impact assessment was not required. Irish-language signage was also displayed within Belfast Grand Central Station and throughout the city, during the 2026 Fleadh Cheoil, although this consisted of event and promotional material rather than the permanent bilingual wayfinding, passenger information and safety signage covered by the disputed scheme.

=== Other issues ===
Other issues and criticisms relating to Belfast Grand Central made prior to and following its opening include:

- The lack of integration with the new Glider rapid transport system has been criticised as a missed opportunity for the transport hub nature of Grand Central.
- The replacement of the large roof covering the railway platforms in the original plans with smaller canopies over each island platform was criticised by campaigners. Translink responded, stating that the changes to the roof design of the new station were driven by considerations of "best design, passenger comfort, and air quality."
- In late 2024, John O'Dowd acknowledged that the new station had contributed to severe traffic congestion in Belfast but also highlighted the ongoing resurfacing work on the Sydenham Bypass as a significant factor.
- In January 2025, books about the British Army's Parachute Regiment and General Sir Mike Jackson were reportedly left in a shared Translink staff room at Grand Central station shortly before the anniversary of Bloody Sunday. The Parachute Regiment was involved in the Bloody Sunday incident in 1972, during which British soldiers shot and killed 14 unarmed civil rights protesters in Derry. Mark Durkan, an SDLP MLA, raised the issue with Translink and described it as “a clear attempt to create division and cause offence”.
- Despite being listed on the screens on the ticket vending machines, cross-border rail tickets to Dundalk, Drogheda, Dublin or any station in the Republic of Ireland cannot be purchased at the ticket vending machines in Belfast Grand Central; instead passengers must queue at the ticket office. SDLP MLA Justin McNulty criticised the system as “partitionist” and a “two-tier approach to cross-border rail services,” calling for simplified, unified ticketing and fare structures across the island.

== Services ==
=== Rail services ===
Belfast Grand Central station acts as the terminus for all active railway lines in Northern Ireland, with the exception of the Coleraine-Portrush line. It also forms the northern terminus of the Belfast–Dublin railway line, historically known as the Great Northern main line.

==== Bangor Line ====
On the Bangor Line, the station operates a half-hourly stopping service to Bangor on weekdays and Saturdays, with additional express services at peak times. On Sundays, the line reduces to hourly operation between Grand Central and Bangor.

==== Derry~Londonderry Line ====
The Derry~Londonderry Line operates an hourly service to Derry~Londonderry on weekdays and Saturdays, with some extra peak services terminating at Coleraine. On Sundays, this services remains hourly, however the terminus alternates every hour between Derry~Londonderry and Portrush. This results in only a two-hourly service to all stations beyond Coleraine.

==== Dublin Line (Enterprise) ====
The Enterprise currently operates as an hourly service (on the hour) on the Dublin Line to Dublin Connolly via Portadown, Newry, Dundalk Clarke and Drogheda MacBride from Monday to Saturday. On Sundays, services generally operate every two hours at five minutes past the hour.

==== Larne Line ====
On the Larne Line, the station operates half-hourly services on weekdays and Saturdays. The terminus for these services alternates every half-hour between Larne Harbour and Whitehead. Additional peak-time services operate to Carrickfergus and Larne Town. This pattern results in an hourly service to Larne Harbour. The service reduces to hourly after 7pm. On Sundays, an hourly service runs on this line with the same alternating terminus pattern - this has the effect of providing a two-hourly service to all stations beyond Whitehead.

==== Portadown/Newry Line ====
The Portadown/Newry Line operates a half-hourly stopping service to Portadown on weekdays and Saturdays, with additional services (some operating as expresses) at peak times to Lisburn and Newry. On Sundays the line reduces to hourly operation between Grand Central and Portadown, with Newry only being served by the last train of the day. No trains stop at Scarva and Poyntzpass on Sundays.

=== Bus services ===
The first bus to use Grand Central's bus station was the X1 Goldline bus service to Dublin Busáras on 8 September 2024.

Preceding station	Bus service	Following station
Terminus	Goldline; Belfast-Dublin (Route X1)	Sprucefield Shopping Centre
Terminus	Goldline; Belfast-Dublin (Route X2)	Dublin Airport
Terminus	Goldline; Belfast-Derry~Londonderry (Route X212)	Drumahoe Park and Ride
Terminus	Goldline; Belfast-Enniskillen(Route X261)	Ballygawley Park and Ride
Terminus	Goldline; Belfast-Derry~Londonderry (Route X273)	Ballygawley Park and Ride
Terminus	Ulsterbus; Belfast - Drumbo (Route 13)	Belfast Adelaide Street
Terminus	Ulsterbus; Belfast - Drumbo (Route 13a)	Belfast Gas Works
Terminus	Ulsterbus; Belfast - Lisburn (Route 22)	Edenderry
Terminus	Ulsterbus; Belfast - Lisburn (Route 23)	Seymour Hill Estate
Terminus	Ulsterbus; Belfast - Lisburn (Route 24)	Queen's University Belfast
Terminus	Ulsterbus; Belfast via Lisburn - Crumlin (Route 103)	Seymour Hill Estate Ent
Terminus	Ulsterbus; Belfast via Lisburn - Antrim (Route 109)	Seymour Hill Estate Ent
Terminus	Goldline; Belfast-Cookstown (Route 209/209b)	Loughview Park & Ride
Terminus	Goldline; Belfast-Cookstown (Route 210)	Greystone Roundabout
Terminus	Goldline; Belfast-Derry (Route 212)	Toomebridge By-Pass
Terminus	Goldline; Belfast-Downpatrick (Route 215	Belfast Adelaide Street
Terminus	Goldline; Belfast-Newcastle (Route 237/a)	Belfast Adelaide Street
Terminus	Goldline; Belfast-Newry (Route 238)	Sprucefield Shopping Centre
Terminus	Goldline; Belfast-Newry (Route 238b)	Church Square
Terminus	Goldline; Dungiven-Limavady (Route 246)	Toomebridge By-Pass
Terminus	Goldline; Belfast-Lurgan/Portadown (Route 250/250b)	Moira Main Street
Terminus	Goldline; Belfast-Armagh (Route 251/d)	Portadown Market Street
Terminus	Goldline; Belfast-Dungannon/Enniskillen (Route 261(c/d/u))	Dungannon Bus Station
Terminus	Goldline; Belfast-Monaghan (Route 270)	Toomebridge By-Pass
Terminus	Goldline; Belfast-Cavan (Route 271)	Toomebridge By-Pass
Terminus	Goldline; Belfast-Omagh via Dungannon (Route 273/273b)	Loughview Park & Ride
Queen's University	Goldline; Queens University - Derry~Londonderry Ulster University (Route 290q)	Toomebridge By-Pass
Terminus	Airport Express; International Airport Express (Route 300/300a)	Belfast Queen Street
Terminus	Ulsterbus; Belfast - Drumbo (Route 513)	Belfast Adelaide Street
Terminus	Ulsterbus; Belfast - Downpatrick (Route 515)	Belfast Adelaide Street
Terminus	Ulsterbus; Belfast - Downpatrick (Route 516)	Belfast Adelaide Street
Terminus	Ulsterbus; Belfast - Ballynahinch (Route 518a)	Belfast Adelaide Street
Terminus	Ulsterbus; Belfast - Newcastle (Route 520)	Belfast Adelaide Street
Terminus	Ulsterbus; Belfast - Edenderry (Route 522)	Queen's University Belfast
Terminus	Ulsterbus; Belfast - Lisburn (Route 523)	Seymour Hill Estate
Terminus	Ulsterbus; Belfast - Lisburn (Route 524)	Queen's University Belfast
Terminus	Ulsterbus; Belfast - Old Warren Estate (Route 525)	Seymour Hill Estate
Terminus	Ulsterbus; Belfast - Lisburn (Route 530)	Finaghy Crossroads
Terminus	Ulsterbus; Belfast - Stoneyford(Route 536)	Belfast Kennedy Centre
Terminus	Ulsterbus; Belfast - Banbridge(Route 538)	Seymour Hill Estate
Terminus	Ulsterbus; Belfast - Portadown(Route 551)	Seymour Hill Estate
Terminus	Airport Express; City Airport Express (Route 600)	Belfast Wellington Place
Terminus	Metro; City Centre - Black's Road (P&R) (Route 646/646a)	Belfast School of Denistry
Terminus	Metro; City Centre - Black's Road (P&R) (Route 650/646a)	Europa Busway
Terminus	Ulsterbus; Belfast - Lisburn (Route 651)	Europa Busway
Terminus	Ulsterbus; Belfast - Ballynahinch (Route 652)	Belfast Adelaide Street
Belfast International	AirCoach; Derry~L'Derry - Dublin (Route 705X)	Dublin Airport
Terminus	Dublin Express; Belfast - Dublin (Route 785)	Dublin Airport
Terminus	Citylink & Ulsterbus; Belfast - Glasgow (Buchanan Bus Station) (Route 923)	Belfast Ferry Terminal
Park Centre Belfast	Eamonn Rooney; Newry Express (Route ER1)	Queen's University
Sprucefield Shopping Centre	Hannon Coach; Glasgow Express (Route HN1)	Belfast Ferry Terminal

== Gallery ==
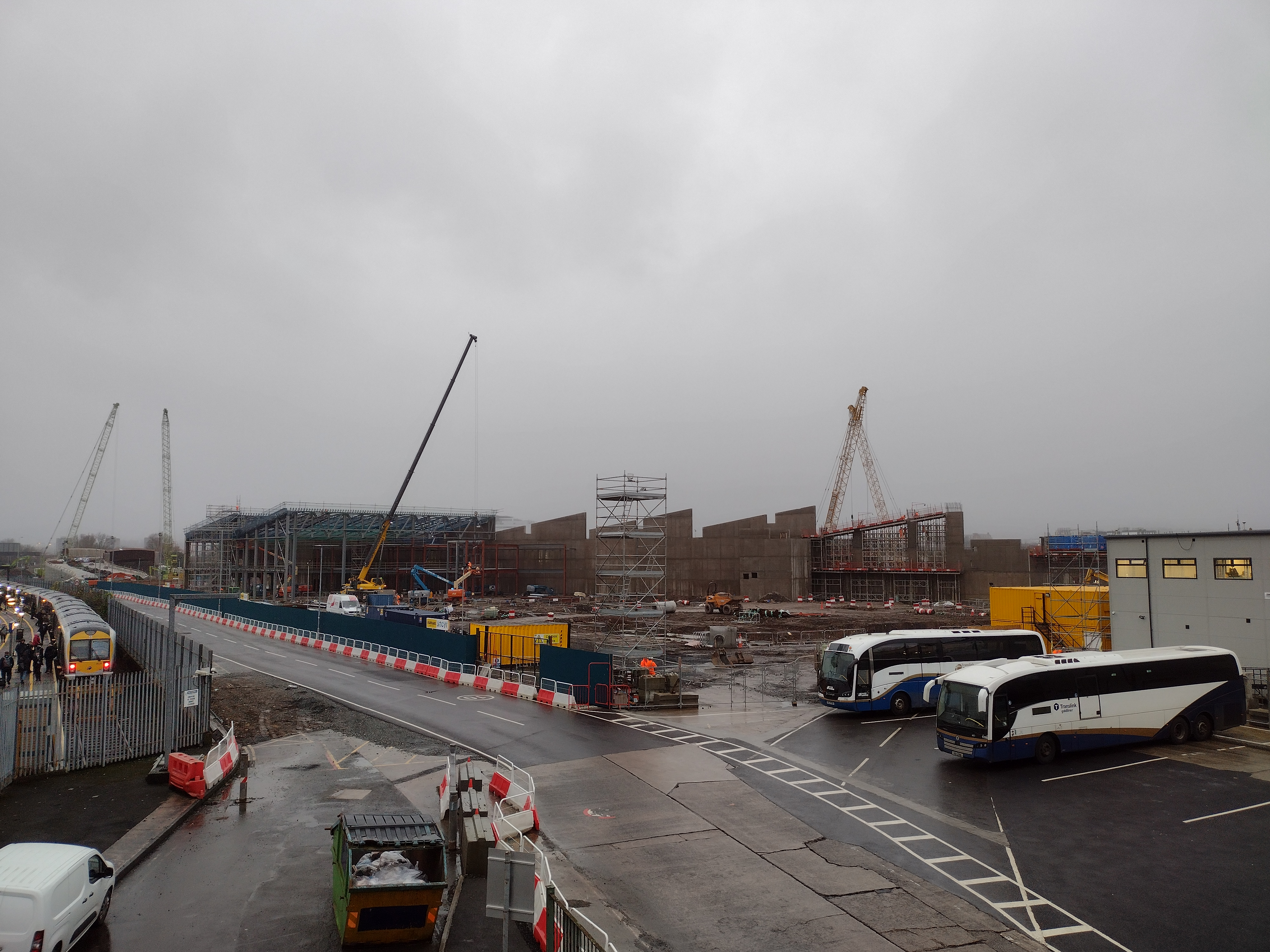
Belfast Grand Central under construction in January 2023

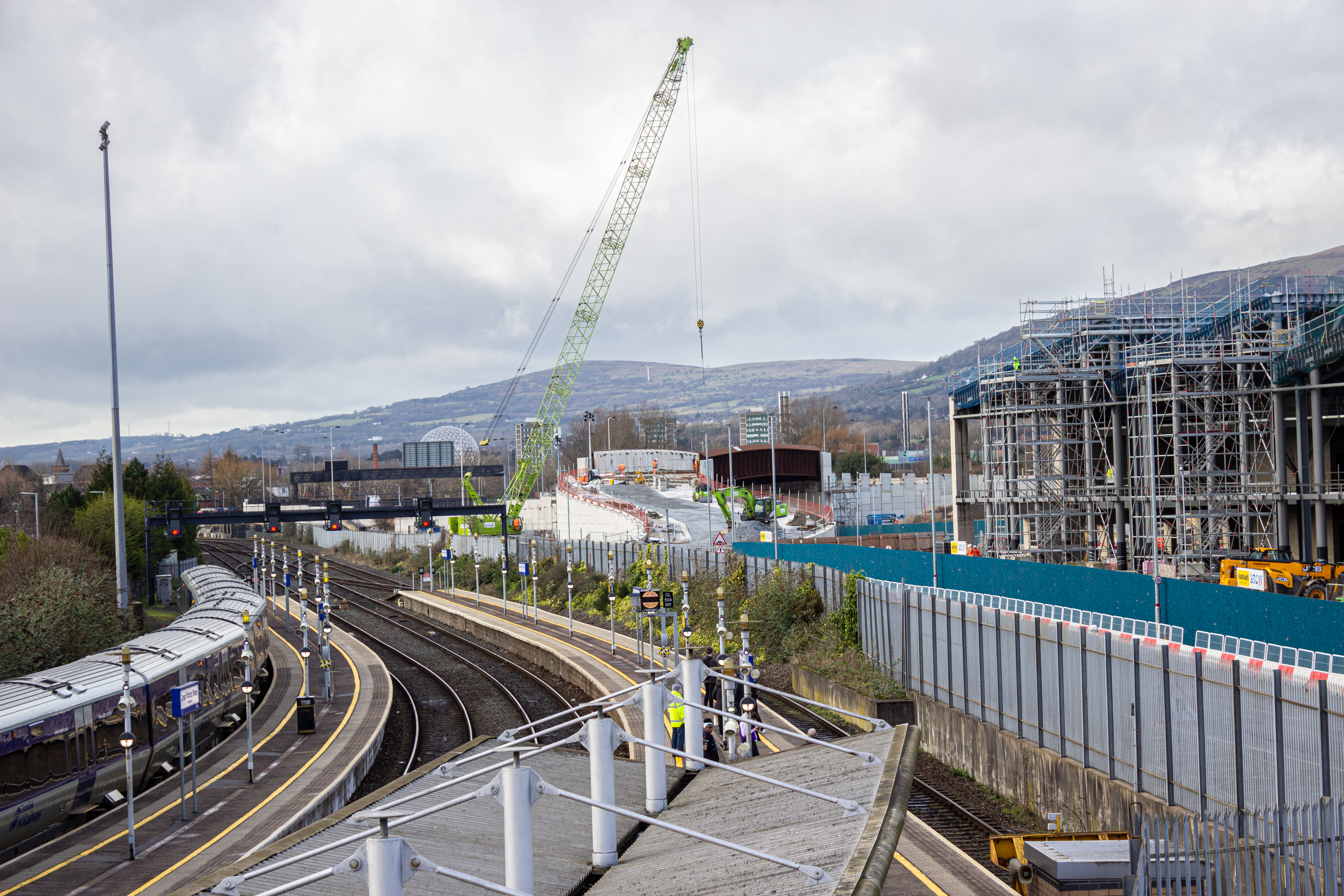
Looking at the station from the former Great Victoria street railway station

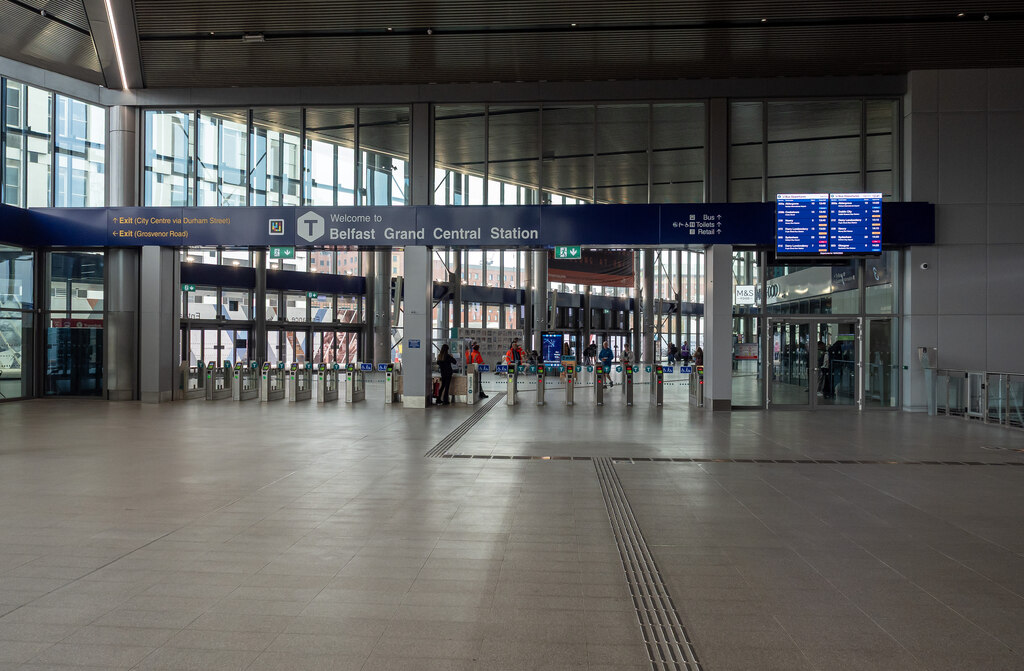
Ticket barriers inside Belfast Grand Central

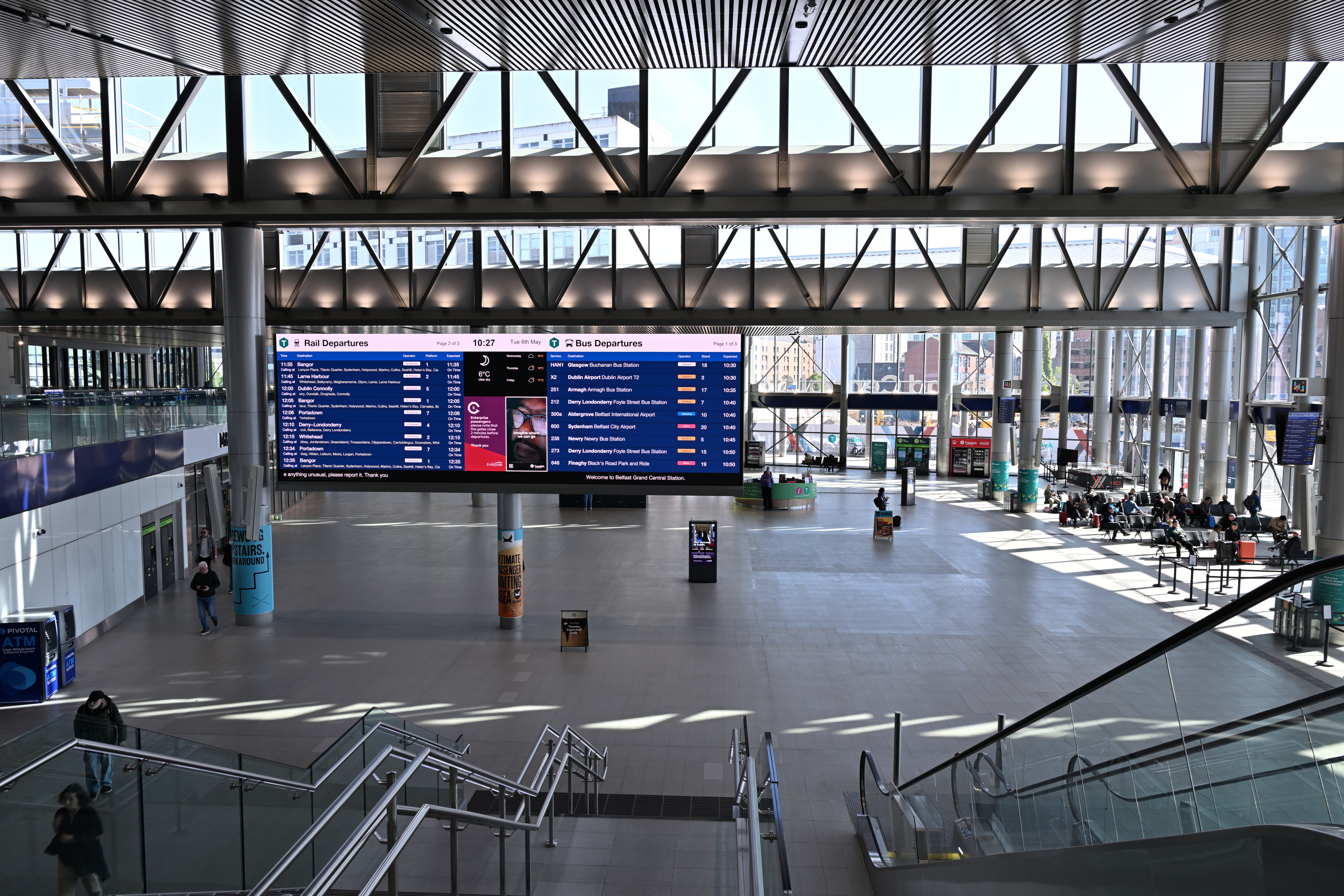
The interior of Grand Central station in Belfast May 25

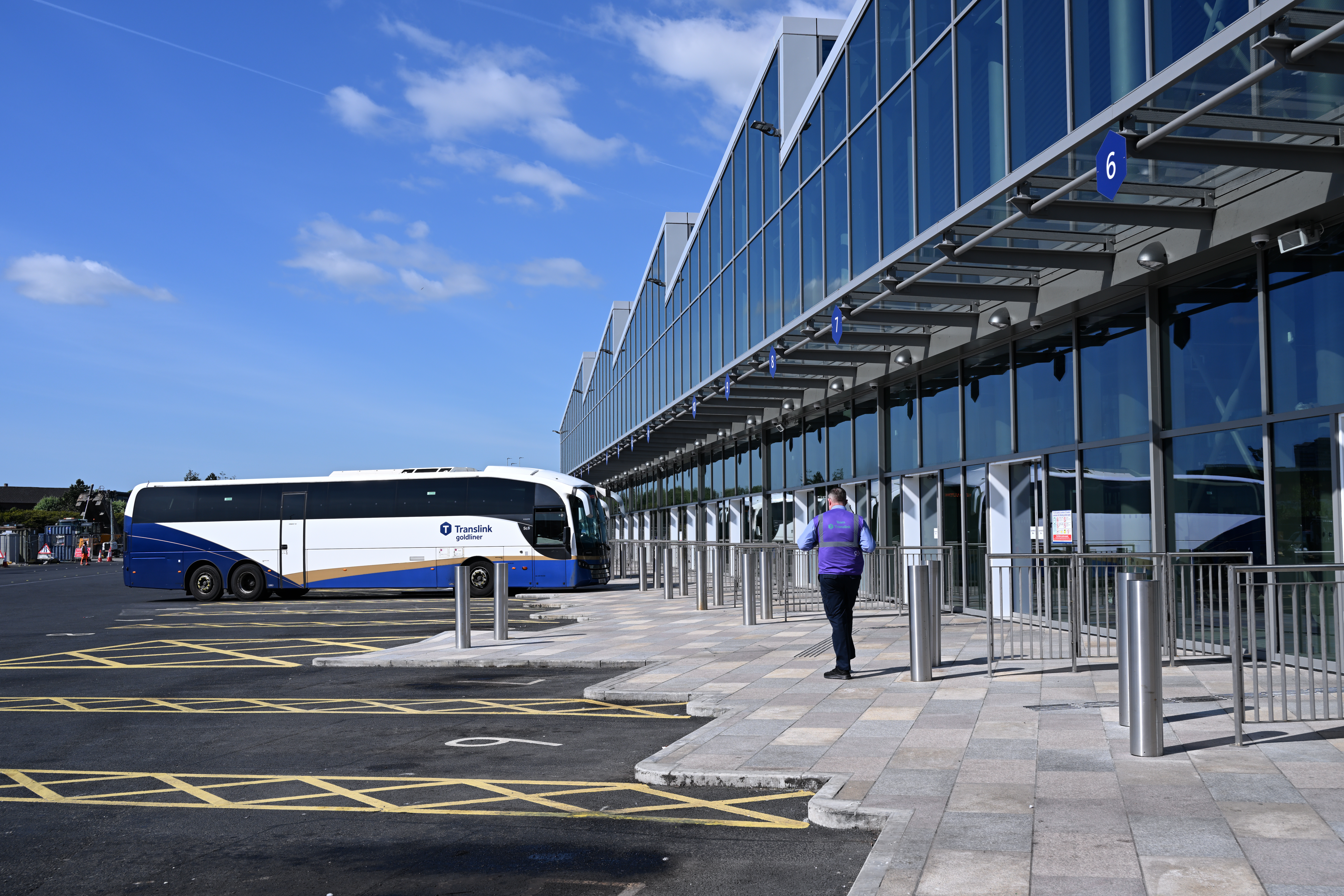
Bus Stand May 25

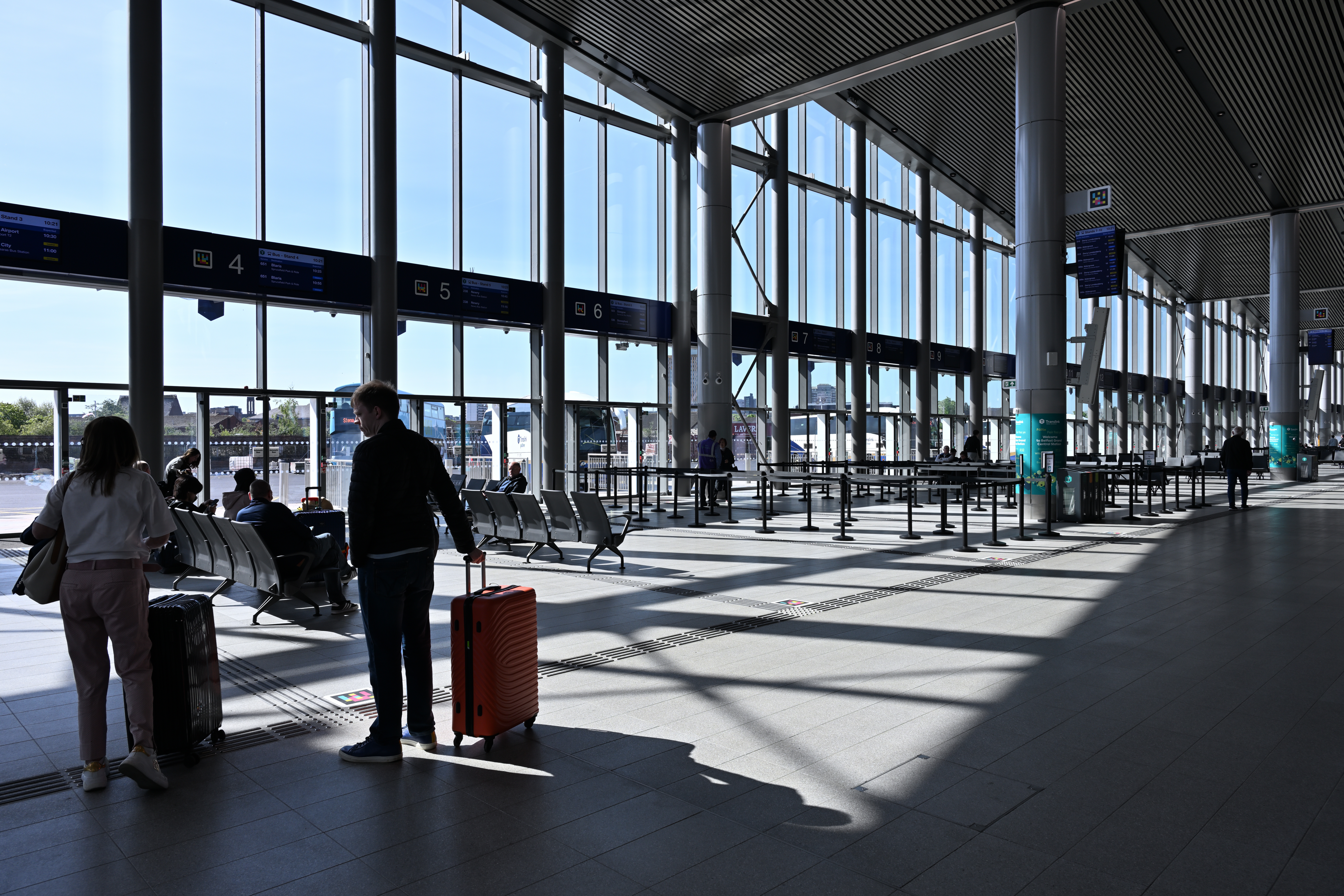
Bus stands waiting area May 2025

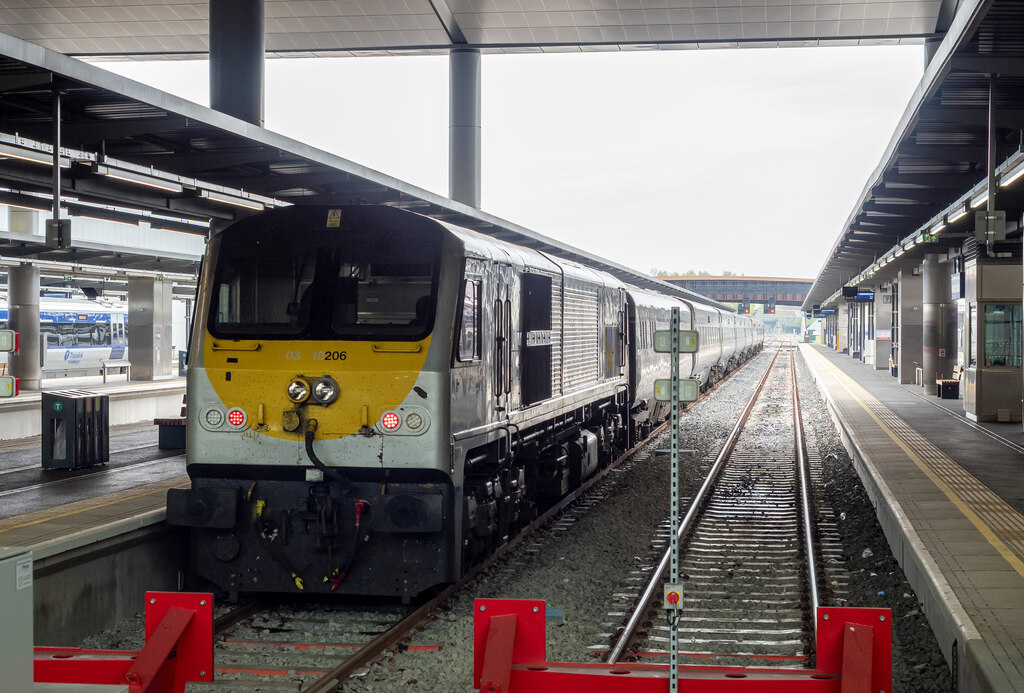
Enterprise train

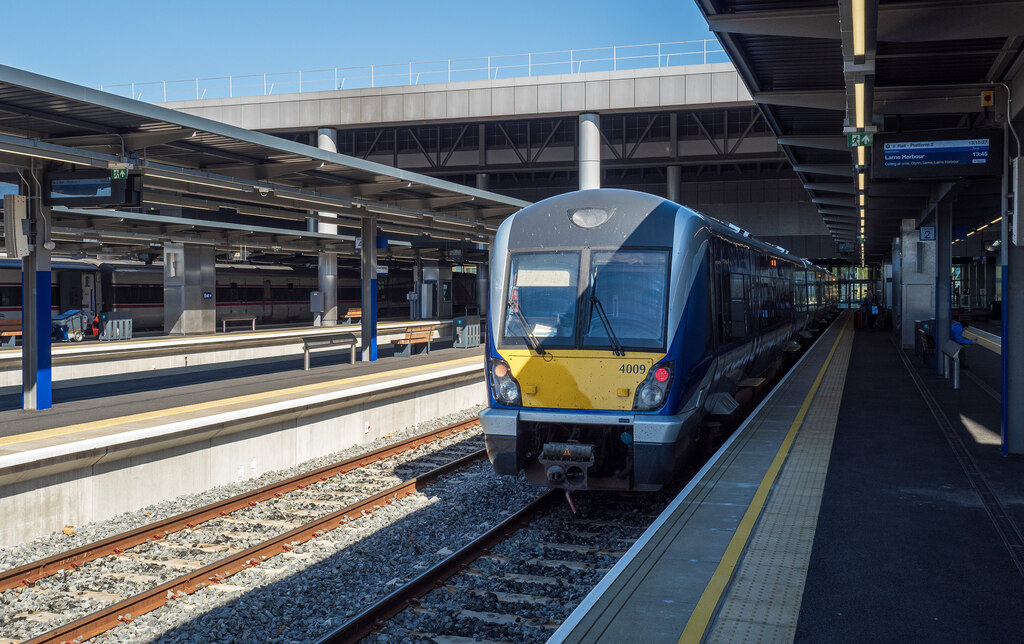
A train at the station
