= Multiple units of Ireland =

Trains used in Ireland

A wide variety of diesel and electric multiple units have been used on Ireland's railways. This page lists all those that have been used. Except with the NIR Class 3000, the numbers given by each class in the lists below are those allocated to the coaches that make up the units in that class, otherwise, unit numbers are not used in Ireland.

== Republic of Ireland ==
Córas Iompair Éireann (CIÉ), which controlled the Republic's railways between 1945 and 1987, mainly used locomotives and hauled stock for its passenger trains. What diesel multiple unit cars it did have were numbered in the 26xx series. Since 1987, Iarnród Éireann (IÉ) has been increasing the use of this type of train, to replace older locomotives and carriages. The only electrified railway network in Ireland is the Dublin Area Rapid Transit (DART) system, in addition to the Luas which runs on a separate network. Its fleet of electric multiple units are numbered in the 8xxx series.

Despite appearing to be a DMU (especially the Driving Van-Trailer end), the Dublin Cork service Mark 4 is an 8-car Push–pull train.

=== Diesel multiple units ===
Class		Manufacturer	Date Built	Number Built	Withdrawn	Image	Scrapped
AEC Class	Initial Order	AEC	1951–1956	66	1987		65
AEC Class	GNR Order	AEC	1951–1956	10	1975		All
AEC Class	Bulleid Order	Inchicore Works	1956		1975		All
BUT Class		BUT	1956–1957	12	1972–1975		All
80 Class		BREL	1974 (Hired from NIR)	3	1990		19
2600 Class (II)		Tokyu Car Corporation	1993	17	still in use		1
2700 Class		GEC Alsthom	1997–1998	12	2012		All
2750 Class		GEC Alsthom	1997–1998	2	2012		1
2800 Class		Tokyu Car Corporation	2000	10	still in use		0
29000 Class		CAF	2002–2005	29	still in use		0
22000 Class		Hyundai Rotem	2007–2011 2019–	63	still in use		0

=== Electric multiple units ===
Class	Manufacturer	Year built	Number Built	Withdrawn	Image	Scrapped
Drumm Battery Trains	Inchicore Works	1931; 1938	4	1949		All
8100 Class	Linke-Hofmann-Busch	1983–1984	40	still in use		2
8200 Class	GEC Alsthom	1999–2000	5	2006–2009		9
8500 Class	Tokyu Car Corporation	2000	4	still in use		0
8510 Class	Tokyu Car Corporation	2001	3	still in use		0
8520 Class	Tokyu Car Corporation	2003–2004	10	still in use		0

== Northern Ireland ==
The majority of passenger services in Northern Ireland have been operated by diesel multiple units since the mid-1950s (the major exception being the locomotive-hauled Enterprise service between Belfast and Dublin), under the tenure of both the Ulster Transport Authority (1948–1966) and Northern Ireland Railways (since 1967). From 2001, all items of rolling stock in use on NIR had 8000 added to their number so as to be part of the Translink number series, which incorporates their road vehicles. The 3000 Class stock are the first multiple units to be numbered from new in the Translink series. NIR purchased an additional 20 Class 4000 DMUs which entered service in 2011 and 2012.

NIR purchased a Windhoff Multi-Purpose Vehicle for use as the Rail Head Treatment Train, equipped to lay sandite and high-pressure water. The MPV was procured to replace a converted Class 80 unit.

Class		Manufacturer	Number Built	In service	Withdrawn	Image
AEC Class	GNR Sets	GNR Works, Dundalk	20 Power Cars (10 After 1958)	1950–1972	1972	
AEC Class	UTA 6 & 7	UTA Works	2 Power Cars	1951–1972	1972	
BUT Class		GNR Works, Dundalk	24 Cars	1957–1980	1980	
MED Class		NIR Works	14 x 3-car sets	1952–1978	1978	
MPD Class		NIR Works	2 x 5-car sets 10 × 3 car sets	1958–1981	1981	
70 Class		NIR Works	8 x 3-car sets	1966–1986	1986	
Class 80		BREL	2, 3, 4 or 6 cars per set	1975-2017	2011 (passenger use); 2017 (departmental use)	
RB3		BREL/Leyland	1 x single car	1981–1990	1990	
Class 450		BREL	9 x 3-car sets	1985–2012	2012	
Class 3000		CAF	23 x 3-car sets	2005-present	still in use	
Class 4000		CAF	13 x 3-car sets 7 x 4-car sets	2011-present	still in use	

== Great Northern Railway (Ireland) ==
The Great Northern Railway (Ireland) straddled the border between the Republic and Northern Ireland, and so was not incorporated in either the CIE or UTA. However, mounting losses saw the network purchased jointly by the Irish and British governments on Tuesday 1 September 1953. It was run as a joint board, independent of the CIE and UTA, until Tuesday 30 September 1958 when it was dissolved and the remaining stock split equally between the 2 railways.

- AEC Class
- BUT Class

== Railcars in preservation ==
Number		Original company	In service	Preserved by	Location
B		Sligo, Leitrim and Northern Counties Railway	1947–1971	Downpatrick & Co. Down Railway	Downpatrick
6111		CIÉ	1952–1987	Downpatrick & Co. Down Railway	Downpatrick
450 Class	458	Northern Ireland Railways	1987–2012	Downpatrick & Co. Down Railway	Downpatrick
450 Class	798	Northern Ireland Railways	1987–2012	Downpatrick & Co. Down Railway	Downpatrick
450 Class	788	Northern Ireland Railways	1987–2012	Downpatrick & Co. Down Railway	Downpatrick
Two–car 80 Class	69	Northern Ireland Railways	1978–2017	Downpatrick & Co. Down Railway	Downpatrick
Two–car 80 Class	749	Northern Ireland Railways	1978–2017	Downpatrick & Co. Down Railway	Downpatrick
Two–car 80 Class	90	Northern Ireland Railways	1978–2017	Downpatrick & Co. Down Railway	Downpatrick
Two–car 80 Class	752	Northern Ireland Railways	1979–2017	Downpatrick & Co. Down Railway	Downpatrick
70 Class	728	Northern Ireland Railways	1966-1986	Downpatrick & Co. Down Railway	Downpatrick
70 Class	713	Northern Ireland Railways	1966-1986	Downpatrick & Co. Down Railway	Downpatrick
80 Class	99	Northern Ireland Railways	1979-2017	East Lancashire Railway	Bury
70 Class	550	Northern Ireland Railways	1966-1986	Railway Preservation Society of Ireland	Whitehead
Railcar 1		Northern Counties Committee (LMS)	1933–1965	Railway Preservation Society of Ireland	Whitehead
Railbus E		Great Northern Railway	1921–1965	Ulster Folk and Transport Museums	Cultra
1		County Donegal Railways	1906–1956	Ulster Folk and Transport Museums	Cultra
10		County Donegal Railways	1932–1959	Ulster Folk and Transport Museums	Cultra
12		County Donegal Railways	1934–1959	Foyle Valley Railway Museum	Derry
15		County Donegal Railways	1936–1959	Donegal Railway Heritage Centre	Donegal
18		County Donegal Railways	1940–1959	Fintown Railway	Fintown
19		County Donegal Railways	1951–1959	Isle of Man Railway	Isle of Man
20		County Donegal Railways	1951–1959	Isle of Man Railway	Isle of Man
RB002		British Rail	1984–1990	Riverstown Old Mill	Riverstown, Louth
1498	76773	British Rail	1970–1993	Quirky Glamping	Enniscrone
1498	62411	British Rail	1970–1993	Quirky Glamping	Enniscrone
1498	76844	British Rail	1970–1993	Quirky Glamping	Enniscrone

== See also ==
- Coaching stock of Ireland
- Diesel locomotives of Ireland
- Rail freight stock of Ireland
- Steam locomotives of Ireland
- Steam railmotors of Ireland
