= Medic (disambiguation) =

Medic is role or occupation in medicine.

Medic may also refer to:

== Arts, entertainment, and media ==
- Medic (Team Fortress 2), one of the nine playable classes in the video game
- Medic (TV series), 1950s television series
- Medics (Polish TV series), 2012 Polish television series
- Medics (UK TV series), 1990s British television series

== Other uses ==
- Combat medic, a trained military personnel who provide treatment on the battlefield
- SS Medic, ocean liner of the White Star Line
- Friedrich Kasimir Medikus, whose name as a botanist has been commonly abbreviated as either Medik. or Medic.
- Flight medic, a paramedic who provides care to sick and injured patients in an aeromedical environment.

== See also ==
- Med (disambiguation)
- Medicago, a plant genus, some of which are called "medic", "medick", or "annual medic"
- Medical (disambiguation)
- "Medicate", songs
- Medication (disambiguation)
- Medicus (disambiguation)
- The Medic (disambiguation)
