= Med =

MED or med may refer to:

== Healthcare ==
- Medical extrication device, a device for extricating an injured patient from an accident site, such as the Kendrick extrication device
- Medication, often used in the plural "meds"
- Medicine (or medical)
- Minimal erythemal dose, the minimum dose of radiation that produces skin erythema
- Multiple epiphyseal dysplasia, a rare genetic disorder
- Title of Medic, the first Physician degree in Argentina
- Minimum effective dose

== Places ==
- MED, the IATA code for Prince Mohammad bin Abdulaziz Airport in Medina, Saudi Arabia
- Mediterranean Sea

== People ==
- M.E.D. (rapper), American Hip hop artist signed to Stones Throw Records
- Michael Eric Dyson (born 1958), American academic, author, and radio host

== Technology ==
- .med filename extension, used for:
  - tracker modules created by OctaMED
  - MEDLINE documents
  - backup files created by WordPerfect's macro editor
- Manhattan Engineer District, US project to develop a nuclear bomb during World War II (colloquially known as the Manhattan Project)
- Media Endpoint Discovery, an enhancement of the Ethernet data communications Link Layer Discovery Protocol
- Multi-Exit Discriminator, a network traffic routing protocol in the Border Gateway Protocol
- Multiple-effect distillation
- Music EDitor, by Tejio Kinnunen, predecessor of OctaMED
- UTA MED, a type of diesel multiple unit railcar of Northern Ireland Railways
- M_{Ed} – design bending moment according to Eurocodes
- Magneto-electric disk (OceanStor Arctic from Huawei)

== Other ==
- Macmillan English Dictionary, by Macmillan Publishers
- Marine Equipment Directive 96/98/EC (M.E.D. 96/98/EC), an authorization by the European Union of equipment and products for the marine industry
- Master of Education (M.Ed.), a postgraduate academic degree
- Ministry of Economic Development (New Zealand)
- Minister of Entrepreneur Development (Malaysia)
- Mediocalcar, a genus of orchids
- Metra Electric District, commuter rail line serving the south suburbs of Chicago, Illinois
- Citizens' Coalition (Swedish: Medborgerlig samling), Swedish political party

== See also ==
- Meda (disambiguation)
- Mede (disambiguation)
- Medi
- Medic (disambiguation)
- Medo (disambiguation)
- Medus
