= Meddy (disambiguation) =

Meddy or Meddie may refer to:

== People with the name ==
- Meddy (singer) (born 1989), Rwandan singer
- Meddie Gallant (1848–1933), Prince Edward Island politician
- Meddie Kagere (born 1986), Rwandan footballer
- Meddie Kaggwa (1955–2010), Ugandan lawyer and human rights activist
- Méddy Lina (born 1986), Guadeloupean footballer
- Daniil Medvedev (born 1996), Russian tennis player sometimes nicknamed 'Meddy'

== Other ==
- Meddies, currents formed in the Mediterranean Sea
- Meddy, Qatari healthcare platform

== See also ==
- Med
- Medy
- Maddy (disambiguation)
