= NIR 80 Class =

Class of three-car diesel multiple units

Northern Ireland Railways 80 Class
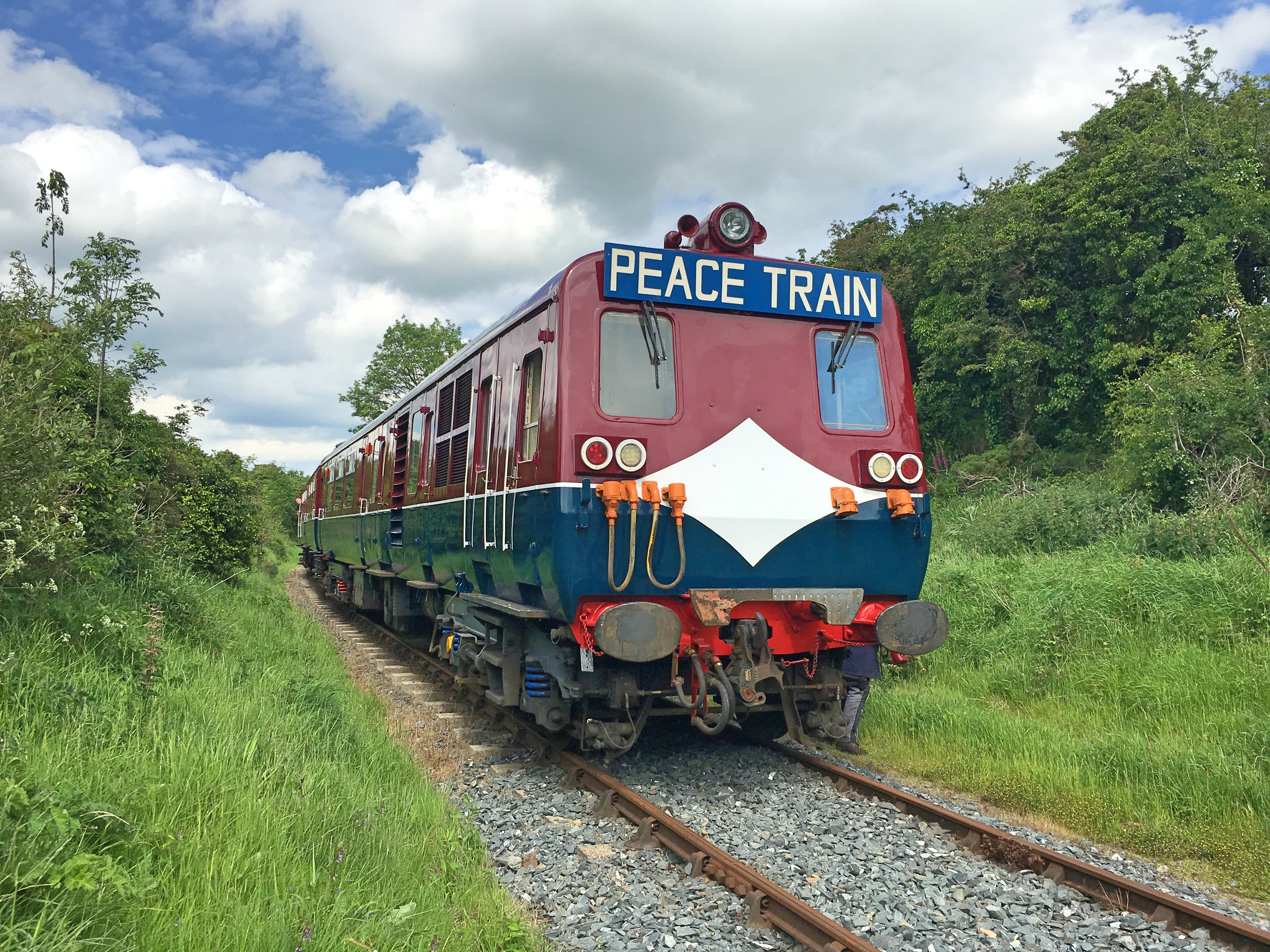
- 80 Class power car No. 69 in preservation at the Downpatrick and County Down Railway
- In service: 1974–2011 (Passenger); 2006–2017 (Sandite)
- Manufacturer: BREL (British Rail Engineering Limited)
- Family name: BR First Generation (Mark 2)
- Replaced: UTA MED; UTA MPD
- Constructed: 1974–1979
- Entered service: 1974–1979
- Refurbished: 2006–2011
- Scrapped: 1983–2019
- Number built: 22 power cars 20 intermediates 26 driving trailers Total: 22 sets
- Number preserved: 3 sets
- Number scrapped: 19 sets
- Formation: 2, 3, 4 or 6 cars per set
- Capacity: Variable depending on trailer capacity, most 3 car sets up to 210 passengers
- Operator: Northern Ireland Railways
- Lines served: At time of withdrawal: Belfast-Derry; Belfast-Bangor; Belfast-Newry; Belfast-Larne; Coleraine-Portrush; Formerly: Lisburn-Antrim

Specifications
- Maximum speed: 75 mph (121 km/h)
- Prime mover: English Electric 4SRKT
- Safety systems: AWS, TPWS
- Track gauge: Irish gauge – 1,600 mm (5 ft 3 in)

The 80 Class is a type of diesel electric multiple unit formerly used by Northern Ireland Railways. They were affectionately nicknamed 'Thumpers' by rail enthusiasts due to the thumping noise their engines produced.

== History ==
By the early 1970s, the MEDs and units inherited from the Great Northern Railway (GNR) had been in service for 20 years, and the MPDs for 10 years. To replace these increasingly life-expired units, Northern Ireland Railways (NIR) placed an order with British Rail Engineering Limited (BREL) for 9 new DMUs. These were to be built as four 3-car and five 2-car sets and were delivered in 1974/75. Structurally, the new trains were based on the British Rail Mark 2b bodyshell, which NIR was already using for the Enterprise service. The new trains were classified as the 80 Class.

The power cars were fitted with an English Electric 560 hp (420 kW) diesel engine, with electric transmission to two traction motors mounted on the rear bogie. The seating capacity of the power cars was 45, however after providing for wheelchair accommodation, this was reduced to 42. The vehicle also incorporated a guards/parcel compartment. The intermediate coaches were fitted with an additional door on each side to aid passenger flow and had a capacity of 87. The driving trailers had a small cab built at one end, which necessitated the removal of six seats. This cab was set to the left to preserve the gangway connection, so that two train sets could be coupled together and still allow passengers to travel between the trains. All three types are of integral construction, however the power cars, because of their weight, also have an underframe. They were similar to the UTA 70 Class, both mechanically and electrically.

The 80 Class was intended to replace the aging MED, MPD and ex-GNR AEC and BUT railcars on the NCC services and the suburban service between Bangor and Portadown. The railcars proved so successful that a second series was ordered in 1975, entering service in 1977/78.

Each vehicle was numbered individually, with power car numbers running from 67 to 69, and 81 to 99. The Intermediate Trailers were numbered 761 to 780 and the Driving Trailers were numbered 731 to 756. Power cars 81 to 89 were built between 1974/1975, while 67 to 69 and 90 to 99 were built between 1978/1979. Intermediate Trailers 761 to 764 were also built between 1974/1975, with 765 to 773 being completed between 1978/1979. Likewise, the Driving Trailers were also completed in batches, with 731 to 739 built between 1974/1975 and 740 to 751 built between 1978/1979. The additional coaches were conversions from BR or old NI Railways loco-hauled coaches, and were not original 80 Class vehicles. These were Driving Trailers 752 to 756 and Intermediate Trailers 774 to 780. During the mid-1990s the surviving vehicles were all renumbered by Translink, by adding 8000 to their numbers to avoid duplication with the bus fleet operated by Ulsterbus and Citybus, also Translink subsidiaries.

=== Use by Iarnród Éireann ===
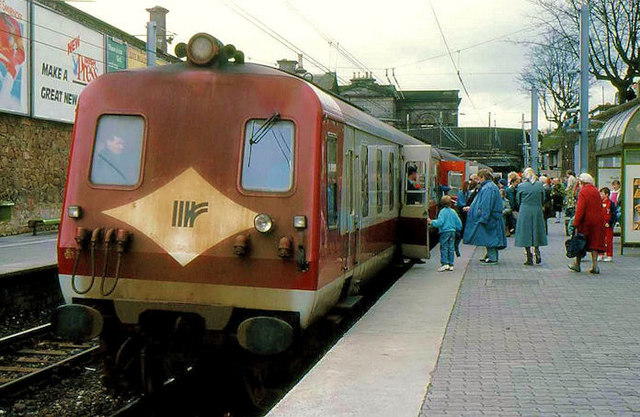
An unidentified 80 class set carrying the then Iarnród Éireann logo at Dún Laoghaire in 1988.

Three 3-car sets were leased by Iarnród Éireann (IÉ) from NIR in October 1987 for use on, respectively, the Bray–Greystones shuttle (previously operated by a push–pull set rebuilt from CIÉ 2600 Class railcars), the Dublin Connolly–Maynooth route, and the Cork–Cobh line. They were originally intended as a short-term measure until Mark 3 push–pull sets became available. The sets entered service on 2 November. In addition to their regular services, they were employed on a variety of other workings, including a nine-car All-Ireland hurling special from Cork to Dublin. However, although the sets were fitted with Continuous Automatic Warning System and IÉ train radio in March 1990 and "for a while it appeared as if the units were going to be purchased by [IÉ]," NIR required them back when the lease expired at the end of October 1990. A brief "stay of execution" for the Greystones shuttle lasted until 26 November.

=== Refurbishment ===
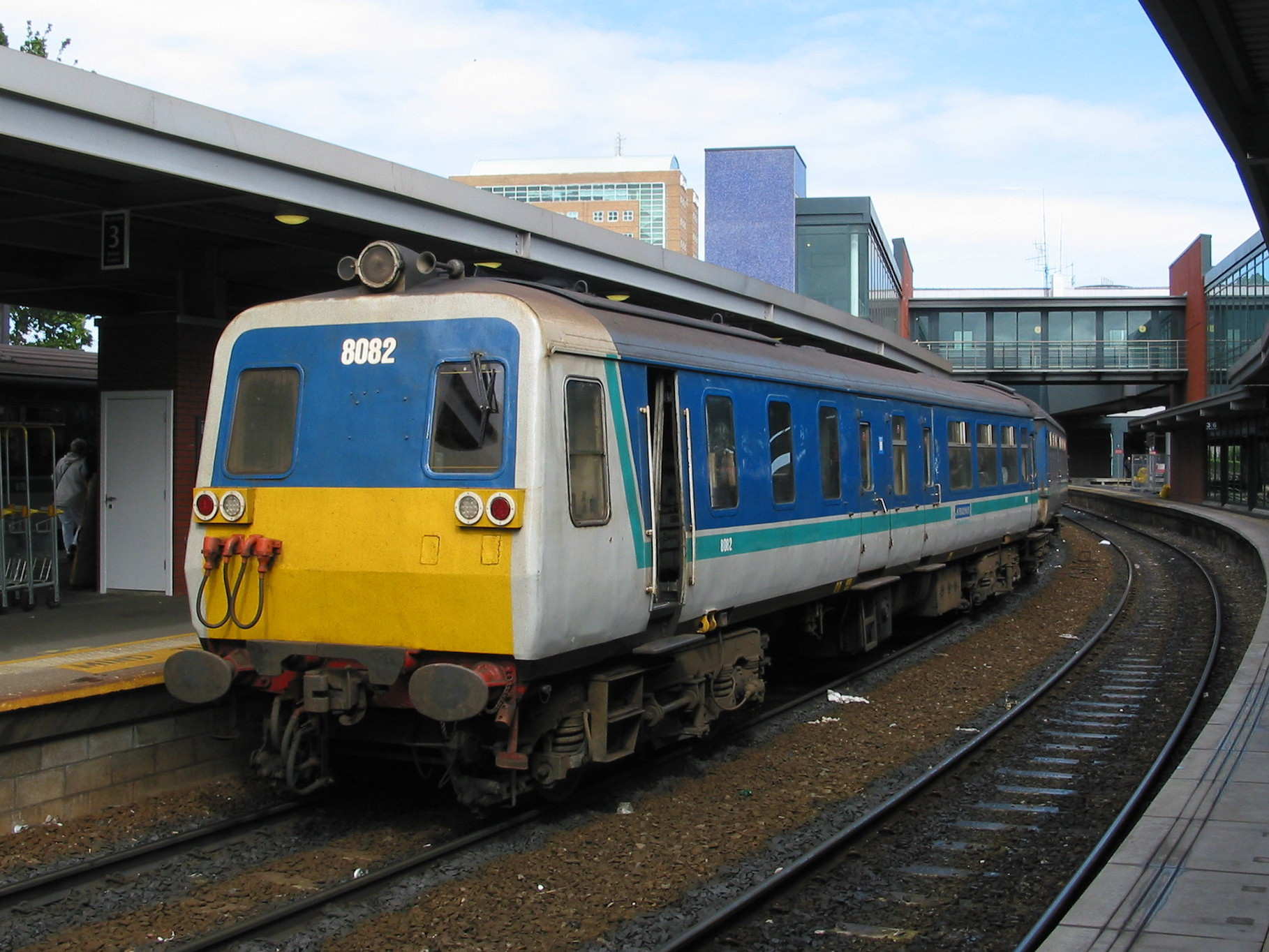
82 at Belfast Central (2004)

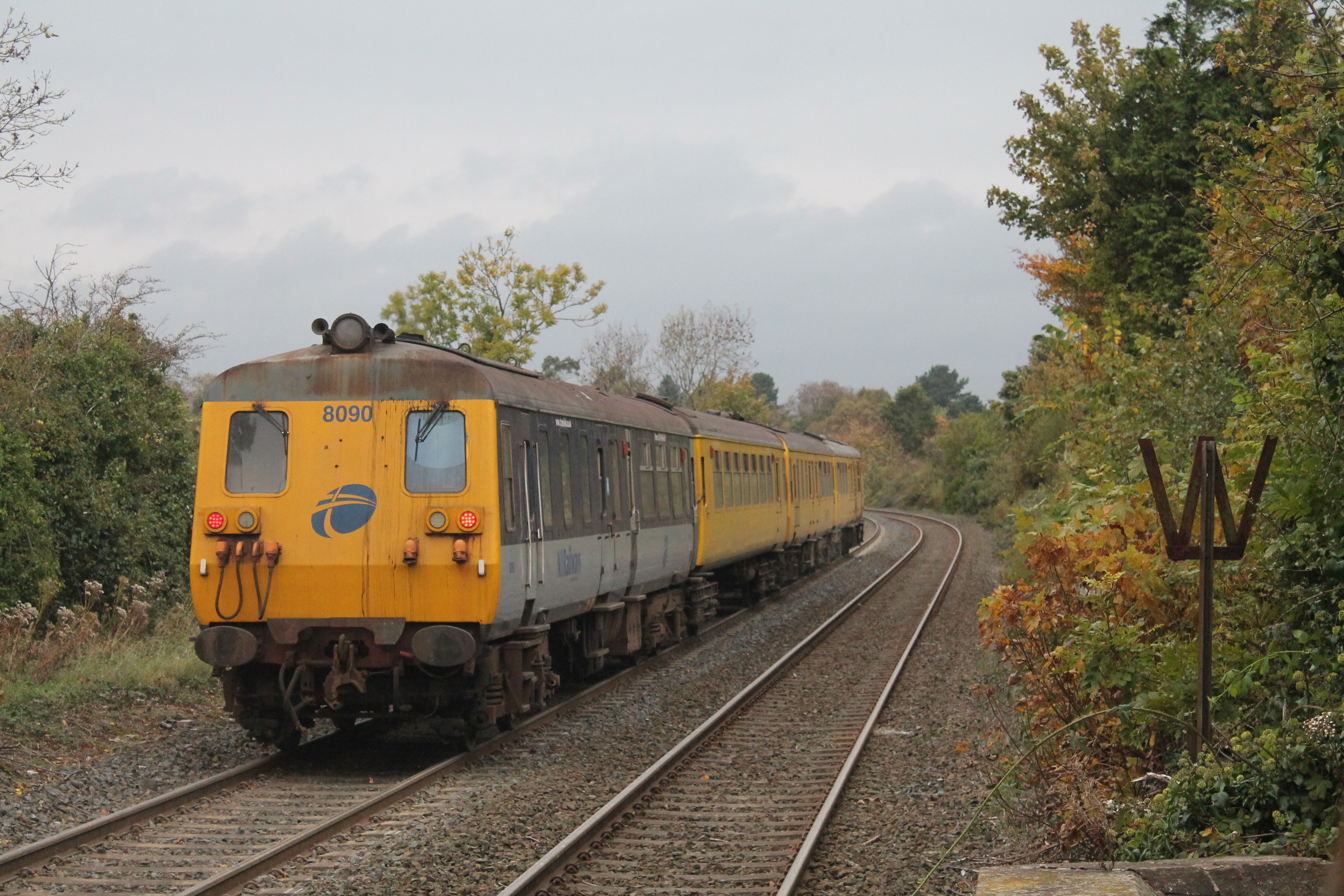
90 at Helen's Bay (2015)

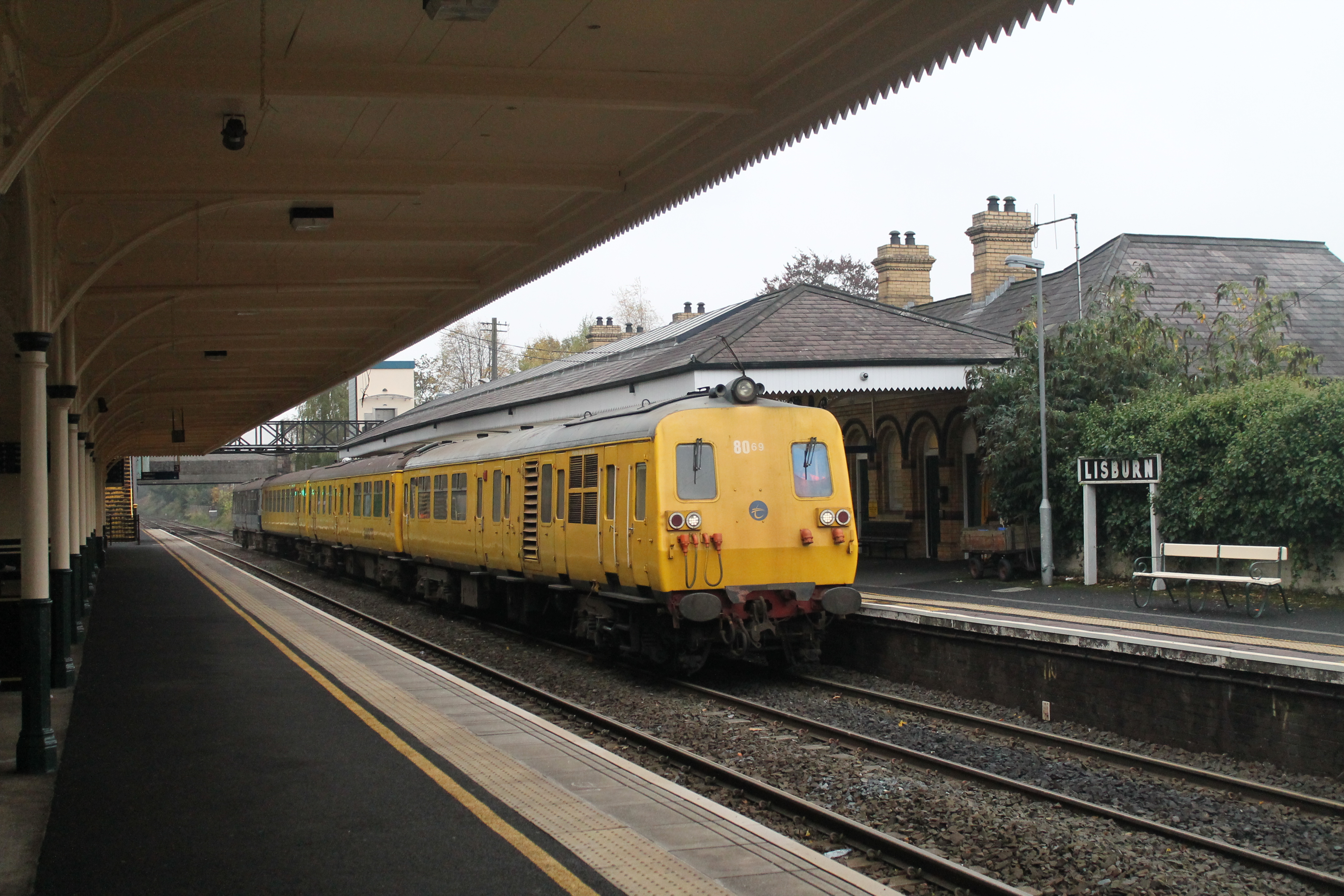
69 at Lisburn (2015)

Despite the increasing age and obsolescence of the 80 Class, the lack of available rolling stock meant that NIR was forced to retain a number of units, even in spite of the entry into service of the new Class 3000. Until 2011, NIR maintained up to three 4-car units for use on passenger services. These saw a pair of 2-car units, a power car and driving trailer, coupled back to back. Six trailers were refurbished and fitted with central door locking enabling them to remain in service until the new Class 4000 units entered service in 2012. (742 had been nominated for retention but was scrapped in May 2008 and replaced in the programme by 752)

The power cars were overhauled at LH services in Staffordshire and the trailers at York Road works in Belfast. Set 89-733-738-69 remained in service until 24 May 2008. Set 93-754-749-94 was sporadically on test from Wednesday 23 July 2008. From Monday 3 November 2008, regular passenger services commenced with this set.

On Thursday 17 December 2009, a second refurbished 80 class was deployed onto the Larne Line. The final sets on the Larne Line were 90-749-752-93 and 94-754-747-82. The third refurbished set was stored at York Road and it consisted of 69-733-738-89. It was rumoured that 82 had been withdrawn from service following from an engine fire. 82 was fixed and returned to working order after the fire in Larne.

On Tuesday 26 January 2010, 89 entered passenger service with 93, 90 was taken off the set on 23 January 2010. 90 was stored at the south end of the south siding at York Road.

=== Withdrawal from passenger service ===
In 2011, the entire 450 Class fleet, together with the remaining 80 Class units, was listed by NI Railways for disposal.

The final 80 Class units were withdrawn from passenger service on Sunday 25 September 2011.

== Sandite and final withdrawal ==
97 was converted to a sandite spraying vehicle in 2006 and in 2006 and 2007 was used on these duties coupled to 89. On Wednesday 1 October 2008, 97 had a test run with refurbished 82 and this pair were used for sandite trains until December 2008.

In 2009, 97 was on Sandite duties again with 82. During October 2009 while out on sandite duties, the engine in 97 exploded. 82 struggled with hauling dead 97 so it was decided to add 94 to back of the train to help it along.

Three Power cars 69+94+90 and two driving trailers 749+752 were overhauled, and in 2012, 97 was painted in all-over yellow to help commuters identify it as a non-passenger train. In 2013, 69, 94 and 752 were repainted into all yellow livery to join 97. As part of this repaint, 69 was accidentally renumbered 96.

After the 2014 Sandite season, 94 was taken off the set and replaced with 90, which was never repainted into the Sandite train's yellow sandite livery. It ran as such for 2015, 2016 and 2017 with the final run taking place on Wednesday 22 November 2017.

All but one of the Sandite vehicles were preserved. The last remaining 80 Class vehicle in NIR ownership, 97, was scrapped at York Road on 8 June 2019.

== Preservation ==
=== Downpatrick & County Down Railway ===
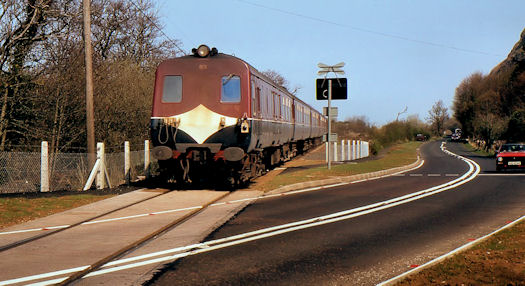
An 80 Class at Umbra level crossing in original maroon and blue livery in 1987.

On Tuesday 27 March 2018, the Downpatrick and County Down Railway announced it was to preserve four 80 Class vehicles, consisting of two power cars 69 and 90, and two driving trailers 749 and 752. 69 and 749 have been painted in the original, as-delivered maroon and blue livery. (See photo to right) The fundraising appeal for the campaign can be found on the DCDR's website. In April it emerged that the campaign was endorsed by Pete Waterman, one of the most notable individuals in the world of railway preservation and owner of several locomotives, including at one point No. 4472 ''Flying Scotsman''. 69 is particularly notable for having worked the last Peace Train in 1995, an accolade which made it the subject of an episode of Chris Tarrant: Extreme Railways in 2019.

90 and 752 left York Road for the Downpatrick and County Down Railway on 12 May 2018, and 69 and 749 joined them the next day. It is planned that No. 69 will be named ''Mike Collins'' in honour of the railway's former chairman. No. 69 was started for the first time in preservation on 26 May 2018. It ran for the first time under its own power on 23 June 2018, with a series of crew training and platform-gauging runs to Inch Abbey, Downpatrick Loop Platform, and Magnus Grave. Power car No. 90 was similarly started for the first time since it arrived at DCDR, on 7 July 2018. The same day, 69 and 749 entered the main platform at Downpatrick station, completing their gauging trials and thus enabling them to traverse the entire DCDR network.

69 and 749 put in a cameo appearance at the 2019 Irish Traction Group 30th anniversary diesel gala, but could not carry passengers due to ongoing floor repairs in 749. The pair were originally planned to enter service in May 2020, but their launch has been postponed until further notice due to the COVID-19 pandemic. 90 and 752 are much longer-term projects for full restoration, though 90 has successfully worked in multiple with 69 and 749 since arriving at DCDR.

=== Other ===
One other 80 Class vehicles are preserved outside the DCDR. Power car 99 is at the East Lancashire Railway in England, having been purchased for spare parts for 207202. It is currently used as a workshop/storeroom.

== Fleet details ==
| Class | Operator | Year built | Cars per set | Unit nos. | Notes |
|---|---|---|---|---|---|
| 80 Class | Northern Ireland Railways | 1974–1979 | Varied in service, typically 3 or 4 | 67–69; 81–99 | No. 69, 90, 99, 749 and 752 Preserved. |

== Status of 80 Class Units ==
| Scrapped |
| Preserved |

=== Power cars ===
| Number | Status | Notes |
|---|---|---|
| 67 | Scrapped | Was involved in the derailment at Downhill in Tuesday 4 June 2002, after colliding with a rockfall. Scrapped on Monday 6 December 2004. |
| 68 | Scrapped | Removed from Adelaide Yard and scrapped on Friday 30 May 2008. |
| 69 | Preserved | Underwent refurbishment by LH Services at Barton under Needwood, England. Returned to York Road Works on Friday 18 September 2009. Part of Sandite train. 69 was withdrawn on Friday 9 December 2016, but returned to service during the 2017 sandite season to run alongside the new NIR MPV. Its final sandite run took place on Wednesday 22, November 2017. Repainted into original NIR livery (maroon and blue) before entering preservation at the Downpatrick and County Down Railway on 13 May 2018. |
| 81 | Scrapped | Named The Boys Brigade in 1988. A 21-year-old female passenger was killed on 81 in a bombing close to Moira. 81 was re-built two years later in 1978 and re-entered service the same year. Scrapped in January 2006. |
| 82 | Scrapped | Badly damaged in the arson attack at Lurgan in Sunday 6 July 1997, but repaired in 1999. Returned after refurbishment by LH Services on Monday 15 September 2008. Returned to passenger service on Thursday 17 December 2009, after spending the last two years exclusively working on sandite duties. Engine block cracked. Cut up in Ballymena and Scrapped in Ahoghill February 2012. |
| 83 | Scrapped | Damaged during 1992, rebuilt the following year in 1993 and finally scrapped on Friday 11 July 2008. |
| 84 | Scrapped | Removed from Adelaide and scrapped in 2008. |
| 85 | Scrapped | Removed from Adelaide and scrapped on Friday 11 July 2008. |
| 86 | Scrapped | Named Glendun in 1992. Removed and scrapped on Friday 11 July 2008. |
| 87 | Scrapped | Rebuilt in 1979 after being damaged by a bomb at Londonderry. Scrapped in January 2006. |
| 88 | Scrapped | Scrapped after an accident at Hilden in Friday 25 March 1983. Equipment was re-used in power car 459, to make up the ninth 450 Class set. |
| 89 | Scrapped | Refurbished by LH Services at Barton under Needwood, England, and returned to York Road Works on Tuesday 8 July 2009. Re-entered service on Tuesday 26 January 2010. Engine block cracked. Cut at Ballymena and scrapped at Ahoghill on Thursday 2 February 2017. |
| 90 | Preserved | Refurbished by LH Services at Barton under Needwood, England, and returned to Adelaide Yard on Sunday 14 December 2008. Formerly part of Sandite Train. Replaced 94 on the sandite train at the start of the 2015 season. 90 was withdrawn on Friday 9 December 2016 but returned to service during the 2017 sandite season to operate alongside the new NIR Multi-purpose vehicle (MPV). Final Sandite run took place on Wednesday 22 November 2017. Arrived at the Downpatrick and County Down Railway for preservation still carrying its 'Red Bull' livery on 12 May 2018. |
| 91 | Scrapped | Scrapped Wednesday 28 May 2008. |
| 92 | Scrapped | Scrapped during May 2009. |
| 93 | Scrapped | Damaged at Finaghy in 1980, but rebuilt the following year in 1981. Returned after refurbishment by LH Services on Monday 12 May 2008. Electrical defect. Cut up in Ballymena and Scrapped in Ahoghill February 2012. |
| 94 | Scrapped | Named Glenariff in 1989. Refurbished; returned on Wednesday 2 April 2008. This power car was removed from the sandite train at the end of the 2014 season following an engine failure and was replaced by power car No. 90. Cut up at York Road and scrapped at Ahoghill on 11 March 2017. |
| 95 | Scrapped | Withdrawn after fire damage on 4 November 2000 and scrapped at Belfast Docks in December 2001. |
| 96 | Scrapped | Named Glenshane in 1989. Scrapped in January 2006. |
| 97 | Scrapped | Named Glenshesk in 1990. Suffered irreparable engine damage back in October 2009 and was hauled by two other power cars as part of the Sandite Unit. Final Sandite run took place on Wednesday 22 November 2017. Cut up at York Road and scrapped at Ahoghill on 8 June 2019. |
| 98 | Scrapped | Named Glenoe in 1989. Scrapped by Clearways on Wednesday 28 May 2008. |
| 99 | Preserved | Named Sir Myles Humphreys in 1978. Damaged in an attack in May 1993, but repaired during 1994. Converted to standard gauge and stored at the East Lancashire Railway in Bury, Greater Manchester, England (intended for spares for other trains, specifically the British Thumpers). |

=== Intermediate Trailers ===
| Number | Status | Notes |
|---|---|---|
| 761 | Scrapped | Date of scrapping unknown |
| 762 | Scrapped | Scrapped on Friday 11 July 2008. |
| 763 | Scrapped | Scrapped in May 2009. |
| 764 | Scrapped | Removed from Adelaide Yard on Thursday 29 May 2008 and scrapped by Clearways. |
| 765 | Scrapped | Removed from Adelaide Yard on Thursday 29 May 2008 and scrapped by Clearways. |
| 766 | Scrapped | Scrapped on Friday 11 July 2008. |
| 767 | Scrapped | Destroyed by fire. |
| 768 | Scrapped | Scrapped on Friday 6 May 2005. |
| 769 | Scrapped | Date of scrapping unknown |
| 770 | Scrapped | Date of scrapping unknown. |
| 771 | Scrapped | Purchased privately in May 2007 and sited at a Bed and Breakfast near Ballynure (closed 2013) cut up at Ballynure and scrapped on Sunday 14 May 2023. |
| 772 | Scrapped | Destroyed by arson on Sunday 6 July 1997. |
| 773 | Scrapped | Date of scrapping unknown. |
| 774 | Scrapped | Scrapped in May 2009. |
| 775 | Scrapped | Scrapped in January 2006. |
| 776 | Scrapped | Scrapped in May 2009. |
| 777 | Scrapped | Scrapped on Friday 6 May 2005. |
| 778 | Scrapped | Destroyed by arson on Sunday 6 July 1997. |
| 779 | Scrapped | Scrapped on Friday 11 July 2008. |
| 780 | Scrapped | Scrapped on Friday 11 July 2008. |

=== Driving Trailers ===
| Number | Status | Notes |
|---|---|---|
| 731 | Scrapped | Date of scrapping unknown |
| 732 | Scrapped | Scrapped in January 2006 |
| 733 | Scrapped | Refurbishment not completed. Cut up in Ballymena and scrapped in Ahoghill February 2012. |
| 734 | Scrapped | Scrapped on Wednesday 28 May 2008 |
| 735 | Scrapped | Date of scrapping unknown. |
| 736 | Scrapped | Scrapped on Thursday 29 May 2008. |
| 737 | Scrapped | Scrapped after an arson attack on Sunday 6 July 1997. |
| 738 | Scrapped | Refurbishment not completed. Cut up in Ballymena and Scrapped in Ahoghill February 2012. |
| 739 | Scrapped | Scrapped in January 2006. |
| 740 | Scrapped | Destroyed by fire. |
| 741 | Scrapped | Date of scrapping unknown |
| 742 | Scrapped | Scrapped by Clearways on Friday 30 May 2008. |
| 743 | Scrapped | Scrapped in May 2009. |
| 744 | Scrapped | Scrapped on Friday 11 July 2008. |
| 745 | Scrapped | Scrapped in May 2009. |
| 746 | Scrapped | Date of scrapping unknown |
| 747 | Scrapped | Returned to service on Monday 3 November 2008. Cut up in Ballymena and scrapped in Ahoghill February 2012. |
| 748 | Scrapped | Destroyed in a bomb attack at Crumlin on Friday 25 May 1979. |
| 749 | Preserved | Refurbished. Spare but unused driving trailer car for Sandite Train. Repainted into original NIR livery (maroon and blue) before entering preservation at the Downpatrick and County Down Railway on 13 May 2018. |
| 750 | Scrapped | Date of scrapping unknown |
| 751 | Scrapped | Destroyed in an arson attack on Sunday 6 July 1997. |
| 752 | Preserved | Refurbished. Part of sandite train until final sandite run on Wednesday 22 November 2017. Arrived at the Downpatrick and County Down Railway for preservation still carrying its all-over yellow sandite livery on 12 May 2018. |
| 753 | Scrapped | Removed from Adelaide Yard on Thursday 29 May 2008 and scrapped by Clearways. |
| 754 | Scrapped | Refurbished. Stopped on Thursday 16 December 2010. Cut up in Ballymena and scrapped in Ahoghill February 2012. |
| 755 | Scrapped | Scrapped on Friday 6 May 2005. |
| 756 | Scrapped | Scrapped on Friday 6 May 2005. |
