= Medicine Township =

Medicine Township may refer to the following townships in the Missouri:

== Missouri ==
- Medicine Township, Mercer County, Missouri
- Medicine Township, Putnam County, Missouri

== See also ==
- Medicine (disambiguation)
