= Medicine (disambiguation) =

Medicine is the modern field of medical practice and health care.

Medicine may also refer to:

- Medication (also called medicine), a drug used to diagnose, cure, treat, or prevent disease
- in the ceremonial context of Indigenous North American communities, "medicine" usually refers to spiritual healing.

== Books and periodicals ==
- Medicine (Elsevier journal), a review journal for physicians founded in 1972 and now published by Elsevier
- Medicine (Lippincott Williams & Wilkins journal), an academic journal founded in 1922 and published by Lippincott Williams & Wilkins
- Medicine: Prep Manual for Undergraduates
- Medicine Magazine, a British consumer health magazine

== Music ==
=== Bands ===
- Medicine (band), an alternative noise-pop/rock band

=== Albums ===
- Medicine (Drew Holcomb and the Neighbors album), 2015
- Medicine (Pop Levi album), 2012
- The Medicine (John Mark McMillan album), 2010
- The Medicine (Planet Asia album), 2006

=== Songs ===
- "Medicine" (Bring Me the Horizon song), 2019
- "Medicine" (Grace Potter and the Nocturnals song), 2010
- "Medicine" (Harry Styles song), 2018
- "Medicine" (James Arthur song), 2021
- "Medicine" (Jennifer Lopez song), 2019
- "Medicine" (Megan Moroney song), 2026
- "Medicine" (Plies song), 2009
- "Medicine" (Shakira song), 2014
- "Medicine" (The 1975 song), 2014
- "Meditjin", a song by Baker Boy
- "Medicine", a song by Daughter from The Wild Youth
- "Medicine", a song by Gloria Estefan from Miss Little Havana
- "Medicine", an unreleased song by Harry Styles
- "Medicine", a song by Hollywood Undead from Notes from the Underground
- "Medicine", a song by Jesu from Conqueror
- "Medicine", a song by Kelly Clarkson from the album Meaning of Life
- "Medicine", a song by MF Grimm from the album You Only Live Twice: The Audio Graphic Novel
- "Medicine", a song by Simon Townshend from the album Among Us
- "Medicine", a song by Starfucker from the album Jupiter
- "Medicine", a song by Tindersticks from the album The Something Rain
- "The Medicine Song", a 1984 song by Stephanie Mills
- "Wedicine" (pronounced as "Medicine"), a song by D'espairsRay from the single "Love Is Dead"

== Other uses ==
- Medicine (Klimt Painting), a painting by Gustav Klimt
- Medicine (short story), a 1919 short story by Lu Xun
- Medicine Melancholy, a fictional character in Phantasmagoria of Flower View from the video game series Touhou Project

== See also ==
- Medecin, a list of people with the surname
