= Il Cittadino di Monza e Brianza =

Newspaper based in Monza, Italy

- Type: Semi-weekly local newspaper
- Format: Tabloid
- Owner: Fortezza Capital Holding
- Publisher: Editoriale il Cittadino srl
- Editor: Sergio Nicastro
- Founded: 17 August 1899
- Language: Italian
- Headquarters: Lissone, Lombardy, Italy
- Circulation: 31,000 (2018)
- Website: www.ilcittadinomb.it

Il Cittadino di Monza e Brianza (commonly known simply as Il Cittadino) is an Italian local semi-weekly newspaper based in Monza, serving the Province of Monza and Brianza in Lombardy. Founded in 1899, it is one of the oldest continuously published local newspapers in the Brianza area.

== History ==
Il Cittadino published its first issue on Thursday, 17 August 1899. The newspaper was established as the voice of Monza's Catholic community during a period when Pope Pius IX's non expedit policy restricted Italian Catholics from participating in national parliamentary politics, encouraging local civic and social engagement instead.

Throughout the 20th century, the newspaper chronicled the civil, social, and economic development of Monza and the surrounding Brianza territory. In 2009, the publication expanded its reach by launching its online news portal.

In February 2019, to mark the newspaper's 120th anniversary, the President of Italy, Sergio Mattarella, sent an official congratulatory message praising the publication's historical roots and highlighting the essential role of local journalism in preserving community identity and media pluralism.

Regarding ownership, from July 2018 to December 2020, the publishing company Editoriale il Cittadino srl was jointly owned by Monza Brianza Edizioni srl and Sesaab spa, under a board chaired by Antonio Calabrò. On 18 December 2020, Monza-based entrepreneur Davide Erba acquired 100% of the company's shares. Following financial difficulties and bankruptcy proceedings involving Erba's publishing company, the newspaper was acquired in June 2026 by Fortezza Capital Holding.

== Editions ==
Il Cittadino is published twice a week—on Thursdays and Saturdays—across five distinct local editions covering the 55 municipalities of the Province of Monza and Brianza as well as parts of northern Milan:

- Thursday edition: Focused exclusively on the city of Monza.
- Saturday editions (four regional editions):
  - Brianza Nord (covering Seregno, Giussano, and Carate Brianza)
  - Brianza Sud (covering Desio and Lissone)
  - Valle del Seveso (covering Cesano Maderno, Seveso, Limbiate, Meda, and northern Milan municipalities including Paderno Dugnano, Solaro, and Senago)
  - Vimercatese (covering Vimercate, Villasanta, Arcore, and Brugherio)

== Notable editors ==
Over its history, Il Cittadino has been led by several prominent figures in Italian politics, trade unionism, and the Catholic Church, including:

- Filippo Meda (first editor; later deputy and minister in the Boselli and Giolitti governments)
- Giuseppe Nogara (later Archbishop of Udine)
- Giulio Pastore (trade unionist and founder of the CISL; appointed editor in December 1924)
- Giuseppe Galbiati (longest-serving editor, from 1969 to 1994)
- Luigi Losa (editor for roughly two decades up to 2014)
- Sergio Nicastro (since June 2026)

== See also ==
- List of newspapers in Italy
