= GNRI BUT Class =

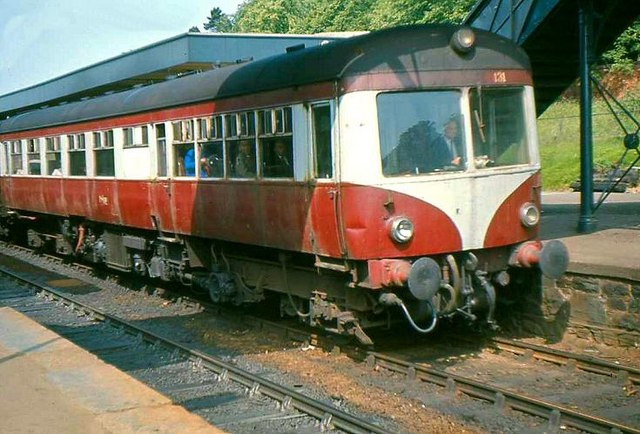
- A BUT railcar operating for NIR at Lisburn in 1974
- In service: 1957–1980
- Manufacturers: British United Traction; Dundalk Works; Park Royal Vehicles
- Replaced: Steam locomotives and carriages
- Constructed: 1956–1957
- Scrapped: 1972–1980
- Number built: 24 power cars
- Number scrapped: All
- Successor: UTA 70 Class
- Formation: 3–8 cars (maximum 4 power cars)
- Fleet numbers: 701–716 (double-ended vehicles); 901–908 (single-ended vehicles); Vehicles inherited by the UTA renumbered as follows: 121–129 (double-ended vehicles); 131–135 (single-ended vehicles)
- Capacity: 56 seats per power car
- Operators: Great Northern Railway (Ireland); Ulster Transport Authority; Northern Ireland Railways; Córas Iompair Éireann

Specifications
- Car body construction: Steel on timber framing
- Car length: 65 feet (20 m)
- Width: 9 feet 6 inches (2.90 m)
- Height: 12 feet 6 inches (3.81 m)
- Maximum speed: 85 mph (137 km/h) (nominal)
- Weight: 38.25 long tons (38.86 t) (single power car)
- Prime mover: Two BUT A230 in each power car
- Transmission: Mechanical; four-speed non-preselector gearbox
- HVAC: Steam heating
- UIC classification: 1A′A1′
- Braking system: Vacuum
- Coupling system: Screw
- Track gauge: 1,600 mm (5 ft 3 in); See Rail gauge in Ireland

The GNRI BUT Class was a fleet of diesel-powered railcars operated by the Great Northern Railway Board and its successors between 1957 and 1980. They were an evolution of the earlier AEC railcars, which had entered service in 1951.

Two variations existed, those were the 700 and 900 Classes.

== History ==
=== Great Northern Railway Board ===
In 1953 the Great Northern Railway (Ireland) was jointly nationalised by the governments of the Republic of Ireland and Northern Ireland. The new Great Northern Railway Board (GNRB) aimed for complete dieselisation of passenger services, and so began planning for a new fleet of diesel railcars, following on from the twenty AEC railcars built in 1950 and 1951.

An order for twenty-four was placed in 1954 with British United Traction (BUT). Unassembled bodies (designed by Park Royal), underframes and mechanical parts were shipped to final assembly at the GNRB's workshops in Dundalk in September 1956, after steel shortages delayed the delivery. The first of the BUT railcars entered service in June 1957, replacing the Belfast-based Enterprise set. As more railcars were turned out, one was used alongside a brake/first carriage to launch a morning express service between Enniskillen and Belfast via Omagh. This service was short-lived, however, as all railway services in County Fermanagh were withdrawn in September 1957 as a result of railway rationalisation around the border. By December of that year, the BUTs were sufficient in number to take over the Dublin-based Enterprise set, as well as commence work on the "Derry Road" line between Portadown and Derry.

Upon the dissolution of the GNRB in 1958, fourteen of the BUTs passed to the Ulster Transport Authority (UTA), and the other ten to Córas Iompair Éireann (CIÉ).

=== Ulster Transport Authority and Northern Ireland Railways ===
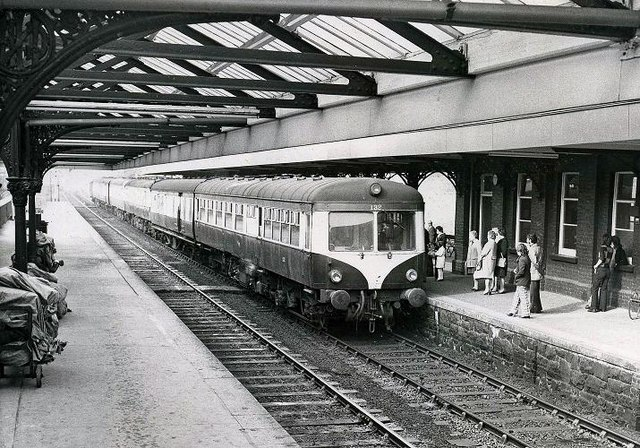
Railcar 132 at Lisburn station on 30 March 1974.

The BUTs inherited by the UTA continued to be used on the Enterprise and "Derry Road" services, before the latter service was withdrawn in 1965. In 1967, the UTA was split into road and rail operations, the latter becoming Northern Ireland Railways (NIR). The BUTs were displaced from the Enterprise service in the late 1960s by the new 70 Class diesel multiple units, after which they were used on local services between Belfast and Portadown. They were gradually withdrawn during the 1970s, although nine vehicles continued in use until 1980 after being converted to hauled stock. Following withdrawal, NIR discovered that the BUTs contained asbestos, so along with other stock they were disposed of at Crosshill quarry near Crumlin, County Antrim.

=== Córas Iompair Éireann ===
The BUTs inherited by CIÉ were eventually relegated to suburban services from Dublin to Howth and Dundalk. All had been withdrawn by the mid-1970s, and were scrapped at Mullingar.

== Fleet details ==
The twenty-four railcars came in two varieties. Eight were built with a full-width cab at one end, similar to those on the earlier AEC railcars, and accommodation for 12 first-class and 40 second-class passengers. These were the 900 Class and as such were numbered 901–908. The other sixteen were built with a half-cab at each end to the left of the corridor connection, and accommodation for 56 second-class passengers, although they had no guard's or luggage compartment. These were the 700 Class and as such were numbered 701–716.

All the railcars were 65 feet (19.8 m) long and 9 1/2 feet (2.9 m) wide, and weighed 38 1/4 long tons (38.9 t). Each was powered by two underfloor, vertically mounted BUT A230 engines, which were capable of 150 bhp. They entered service in the GNRB's railcar livery of blue and cream.

Up to four railcars could be used in one train, with two double-ended vehicles marshalled as intermediates. However, compatibility with the earlier AEC railcars and regular coaching stock was hindered by the fact that they utilised an unusual type of corridor connection.

Following the dissolution of the GNRB, the vehicles inherited by CIÉ were repainted into green, and subsequently into black and tan in 1961. These retained their GNRB numbers, with the addition of an 'n' suffix. The vehicles inherited by the UTA were renumbered, the double-ended vehicles becoming 121–129 and the single-ended vehicles 131–135; all of these had been repainted into Brunswick green, complete with yellow and black "wasp stripes", by 1963. After passing to NIR they were repainted once again, this time into maroon and grey, but retained their UTA numbers.

== Bibliography ==
- Patterson, Edward Mervyn (2003) [1962]. The Great Northern Railway (Ireland). Usk: Oakwood Press. ISBN 9780853616023 – via Internet Archive.
