= Medi (disambiguation) =

Medi may refer to:

- Maedi or Medi, an ancient Thracian or Illyrian tribe
- Medi (singer), stage name of Bulgarian singer, musician and producer Mehmed Ognyanov Gogov (born 1994)
- Médi 1, a commercial Moroccan radio network
- 33376 Medi, an asteroid

== See also ==
- Médis, a French commune
- Medy, a given name and surname
