= Medo =

Medo may refer to:

- Medo Township, Blue Earth County, Minnesota
- Medo, West Virginia
- Middle East Defence Organisation

== People with the name Medo ==
- Medo Kamara
- Medo Martinello
- Medo Pucić
