= Rail freight stock of Ireland =

When formed in 1945, Córas Iompair Éireann (CIÉ) inherited a GSR wagon fleet insufficient for post-war requirements. A major wagon building programme in the 1950s and 1960s eliminated this pre-war stock. The new stock consisted of open or covered general purpose wagons of the four-wheel loose-coupled design, without vacuum brakes and limited to 35mph. There were also a few specialised wagons built for tar, grain and cattle.

These vehicles were in turn superseded and phased out by the introduction of the intermodal fleet in the 1970s. The new liner-trains, complete with vacuum brakes and Y25/Y27 bogies, enabled high speed (60 mph) transportation.

Today, all of Iarnród Éireann's freight stock is maintained at Limerick Colbert. Most of the company's withdrawn freight wagons are stored here as well, though some can be found at Heuston, North Wall Yard and Tralee. A large number of disused flat wagons are stored on disconnected sidings near the former Cómhlucht Siúicre Éireann factory in Mallow.

== Current freight flows ==
- Lead and Zinc Ore from Tara Mines (Near Navan) to North Wall, Dublin
- Intermodal traffic between Ballina and North Wall, Dublin (Suspended)
- Intermodal traffic between Ballina Belview Port, Waterford
- Timber traffic between Westport/Ballina and Belview Port, Waterford

== Freight listing ==
Wagon	Length	Introduced	Numbers	Tare	Coupling	Capacity	Image	Notes
Fertiliser	42 ft 9 in 13,030 mm	1974	35001-35090	21.8 long tons 24.4 short tons; 22.1 t	Instanter	40 long tons 45 short tons; 41 t		
Bogie Flat	42 ft 9 in 13,030 mm	1971 & 1978	30001-30212	16 long tons 18 short tons; 16 t	Instanter			
Bogie Flat	47 ft 6 in 14,480 mm	1978	30219-30278	17 long tons 19 short tons; 17 t	Instanter			
Rail Truck	62 ft 0 in 18,900 mm	1973	24224-24240	20 long tons 10 cwt 23.0 short tons; 20.8 t	Instanter	41.5 long tons 46.5 short tons; 42.2 t		
Wagon					Instanter			
Cement "Bubble"	20 ft 0 in 6,100 mm	1964-1972	25050-25199	10 long tons 4 cwt 11.4 short tons; 10.4 t 10 long tons 10 cwt 11.8 short tons; 10.7 t	Instanter	20 long tons 22 short tons; 20 t		25199 preserved at DCDR
4-wheel Flat	20 ft 0 in 6,100 mm	1970-1975	27101-27791	7 long tons 6 cwt 8.2 short tons; 7.4 t	Instanter	20 long tons 22 short tons; 20 t		27756 Preserved at Downpatrick & Co. Down Railway
Bogie Cement	42 ft 9 in 13,030 mm	1979	33001-33012	22 long tons 25 short tons; 22 t	Instanter	50 long tons 56 short tons; 51 t		
Ballast hopper	20 ft 0 in 6,100 mm	1972 & 1977	24113-24148, 24250-24263	9 long tons 8 cwt 10.5 short tons; 9.6 t	Instanter	20 long tons 22 short tons; 20 t		
Ammonia					Instanter			
Timber flat	62 ft 0 in 18,900 mm				Instanter			In use on Coillte trains between Westport/Ballina and Waterford.
Zinc wagon								All withdrawn at Limerick Colbert.
Shale wagon								All withdrawn at Limerick Colbert. Some converted to zinc wagons.
Pocket wagon								In use on DFDS Liner Trains between Waterford and Ballina.
Tank wagon								Withdrawn at Limerick and Heuston.
Beet wagon								

== See also ==
- Coaching stock of Ireland
- Multiple units of Ireland
- Rail transport in Ireland
- Steam locomotives of Ireland
