= Meda =

Meda may refer to:

== Places ==
- Meda de Mouros, a parish in Tábua Municipality, Portugal
- Medas, a parish in Gondomar Municipality, Portugal
- Meda-Ela, Sri Lanka
- Meda, Lombardy, city in the Province of Monza and Brianza, Italy
- Mêda Municipality, Portugal
- Meda, Oregon, United States
- Meda River, Western Australia
- Meda, Togo
- Međa (Leskovac), village in the municipality of Leskovac, Serbia
- Međa (Žitište), village in the municipality of Žitište, Serbia

== People ==
=== Surname ===
- Alberto Meda (born 1945), Italian industrial designer
- Bianca Maria Meda (1665–1700), Italian composer
- Guido Meda, Italian journalist and television presenter
- Giuseppe Meda (1534–1599), Italian painter, architect and hydraulics engineer
- Igor Meda (born 1967), Russian footballer
- Jack Meda (1945–2019), Canadian boxer

=== Given name ===
- Meda of Odessos (fl. 336 BC), Thracian princess
- Meda Chesney-Lind (born 1947), American criminologist
- Meda McKenzie (born 1963), New Zealand swimmer
- Meda Mládková (1919–2022), Czech art collector
- Meda Ryan, Irish historian
- Meda Valentová (1898–1973), Czech actress

== Other uses ==
- A. C. Meda 1913, Italian football club based in Meda, Lombardy
- HMS Meda, vessels of the Royal Navy
- MEDA, a psychedelic drug
- Meda AB, a Swedish pharmaceutical company
- Meda (fish), a monotypic genus of cyprinid fish
- Meda (mythology), name of several female figures in Greek mythology
- SC Mêda, a football club based in Mêda Municipality, Portugal
