= Medication (disambiguation) =

A medication is a drug used to diagnose, cure, treat, or prevent disease.

Medication may also refer to:

- Drug, any chemical substance that alters the normal bodily function
  - Pharmaceutical drug, any substance intended for use in the diagnosis, cure, mitigation, treatment, or prevention of disease
    - Small molecule drugs
    - Biologic medical products that are regulated like drugs
- A herbal medicine

== Music ==
- Medication (band), a hard rock band
- "Medication", a song by Garbage from Version 2.0
- "Medication", a song by Queens of the Stone Age from Lullabies to Paralyze
- "Medication", a song by the Standells from Dirty Water

== See also ==
- Medicate (disambiguation)
- Meditation (disambiguation)
