= Medicus =

Medicus is Latin for physician.

Medicus may also refer to:

== People ==
- Dieter Medicus (1929–2015), German jurist
- Dieter Medicus (ice hockey) (born 1957), German ice hockey player
- Friedrich Kasimir Medikus (1738–1808), German physician and botanist
- Fritz Medicus (1876–1956), German-Swiss philosopher
- Henry Medicus (1865–1941), American businessman and part-owner of Brooklyn Dodgers from 1905 to 1912
- Medicus Long (died 1885), American lawyer and politician

== Other uses ==
- Medicus (journal), a journal edited by students of the Yerevan State Medical University
- The Physician a.k.a. Medicus, a novel by Noah Gordon
- Ruso and the Disappearing Dancing Girls, published in the United States as Medicus, a novel by Ruth Downie
- Medicus, several physicians in the television series Spartacus: Blood and Sand and its sequels

== See also ==
- Index Medicus, comprehensive index of medical scientific journal articles, published since 1879
- Medicus Mundi International, the Network of private not-for-profit organisations working in the field of international health cooperation and advocacy
- Medic (disambiguation)
