= UTA 70 Class =

Diesel train built for Northern Ireland

Ulster Transport Authority 70 Class
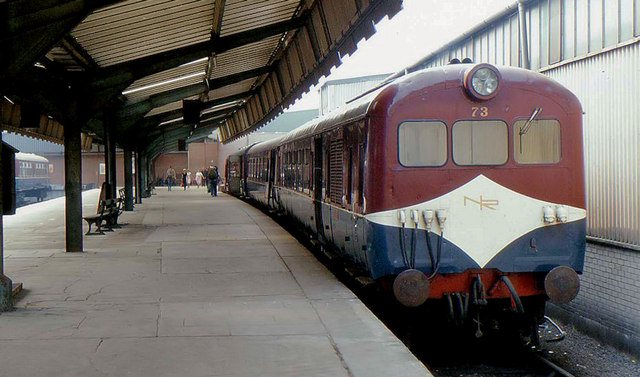
- A Class 70 set stands at Belfast York Road station
- In service: 1966–1986
- Manufacturer: UTA York Road
- Number built: 8 power cars, 18 trailers
- Formation: 3 cars per set
- Fleet numbers: Power cars: 71–78
- Capacity: 248 (6-car set)
- Operators: Ulster Transport Authority; Northern Ireland Railways

Specifications
- Train length: 379 feet (116 m) (6-car set)
- Maximum speed: 70 mph (113 km/h)
- Weight: 245 tons (6-car set)
- Prime mover: English Electric 4SRKT
- Power output: 550 hp (410 kW)
- Track gauge: 1,600 mm (5 ft 3 in)

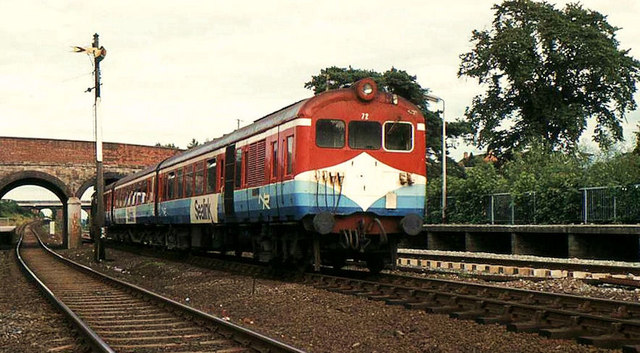
Power car No. 72 leads a three-car unit in Sealink livery into Knockmore station.

The UTA 70 Class was a class of diesel multiple units built by the Ulster Transport Authority at its York Road works in Belfast, Northern Ireland, between 1966 and 1968 for inter-city passenger services on the provincial rail network. The MED’s and MPD’s, which made use of readily available power and transmission units, were cheap to operate but noisier and not as comfortable as locomotive-hauled rolling stock, a fact which made them unsuitable for Inter-City journeys. The decision was made to develop a new generation of multiple unit and in July 1966 the first of the new DEMU sets entered service.

== History ==
Investment was needed on the "Inter City" routes and it was a straight choice between new locomotives and coaching stock or a new generation of multiple unit. The decision was made in favour of new multiple units and in 1966 the first of these entered service, designated 70 Class.

Unlike the MEDs and MPDs with their low - powered underfloor engines and mechanical transmissions spread through the train, the new units had a single English Electric engine of 550 horsepower (410 kW), fitted in a compartment between the driving cab and the passenger saloon, and electric transmission. Whilst construction was carried out at the UTA's York Road works in Belfast they imported underframes and body parts. This order comprised parts for the construction of eight power cars and the modification of existing coaches. The 70 Class were first introduced on the former Northern Counties Committee section but were later also worked cross-border trains.

Like the MPDs these units were also suitable for working freight services and regularly appeared on the CIÉ freight services to and from Derry~Londonderry.

The 70s were numbered as follows:

- Power Cars 71 to 78

The original trailer cars were as follows:

- 548 Buffet car (dual cables for MPD+70)
- 550 Buffet car (converted from MPD car)
- 701-703 Brake cars
- 711-712 Driving Brake cars
- 721-725 Standard trailers

In 1968 and 1969, more trailers were added.

- 554 Buffet car
- 713-714 Driving Brake cars
- 726-727 Standard trailers

The power cars' interiors were rebuilt between 1976 and 1979. During the same period 711 to 714 and 726 were rebuilt from side corridor to open layout. Trailer 728 (brake Standard) was rebuilt in 1976 from MPD driving trailer 534. In 1977, 701 and 703 were rebuilt as Driving Brake Standard open.

It was decided in 1983 that the 70 Class railcars would be replaced, No. 78 had already been withdrawn in 1978 after just 10 years of service after being bombed by the IRA. No. 76 was withdrawn in 1984 and the remaining units followed in 1985–1986. The last set in service was a five-car set operated by power cars No. 75 and 77. Both were withdrawn on Tuesday 1 April 1986. For the new units, and after heavy refurbishment, engines, generators and traction motors were recovered as the 70s were withdrawn for re-use in the new 450 class. After withdrawal, it was discovered that the power cars contained blue asbestos, so they were sent to Crosshill Quarry, Crumlin, along with other NIR stock and even some CIÉ stock for disposal. They were put into a flooded part of the quarry, since water dampens asbestos, meaning that no loose fibers could escape from their structures. Most of the under frames were kept for use as flatbeds.

== Preservation ==
Buffet Car 550 entered preservation in 1978 with the Railway Preservation Society of Ireland, whereupon it regained its original UTA number, 87, and was painted in LMS NCC livery. Intermediate trailer no. 728 lay at York Road until 1991, and is now at the Downpatrick and County Down Railway. Driving trailer no. 713 was also preserved at Downpatrick but was destroyed by a malicious fire in 2002. Its underframe remains in use as a flat wagon.

== Status ==
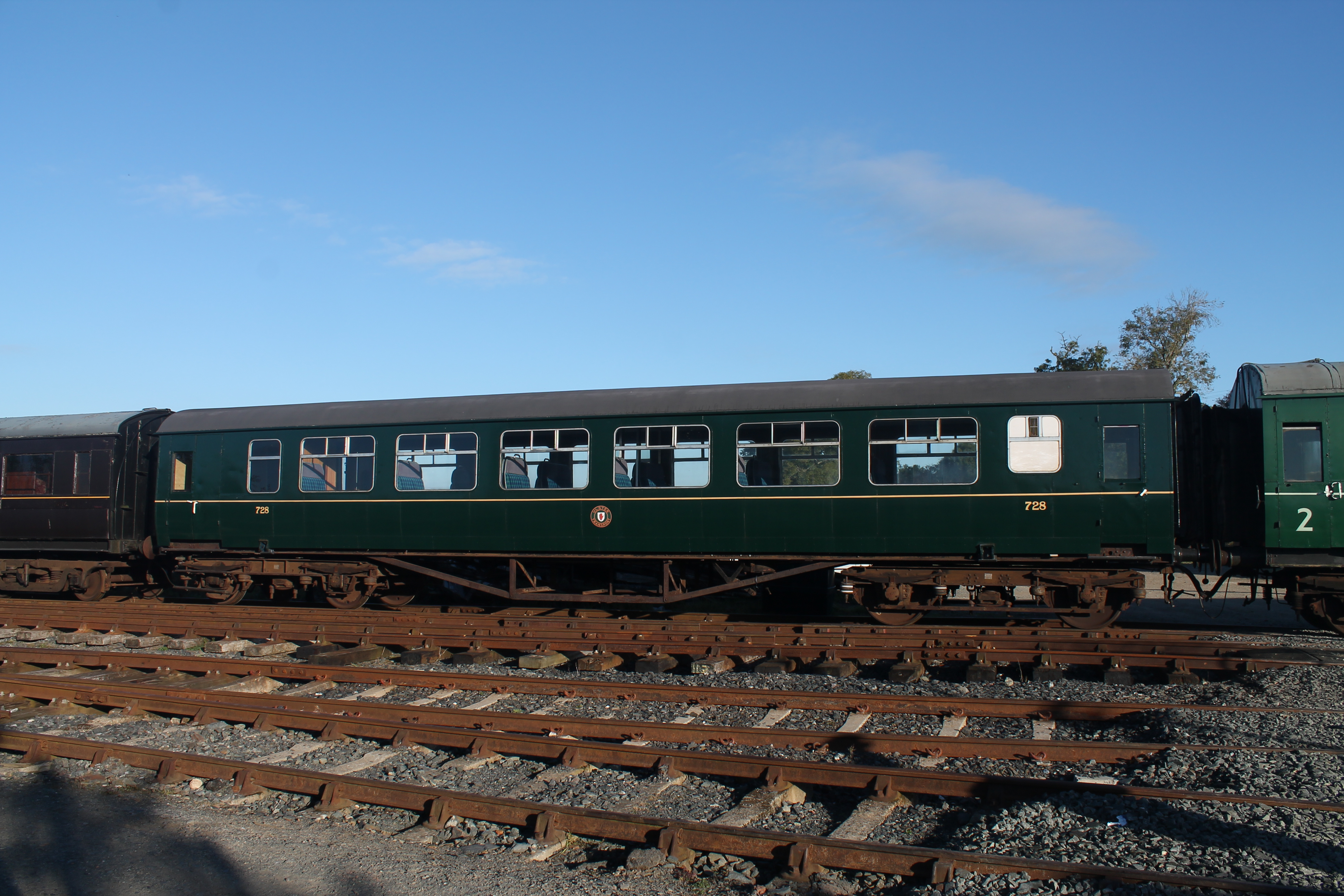
728 At Downpatrick in 2015.

Key:	Scrapped	Preserved

Number	Power Car Name	Status	Notes
Power cars
71	River Bush	Scrapped	Engines, generators and traction motors refurbished for use in 450 Class
72	River Foyle	Scrapped	Engines, generators and traction motors refurbished for use in 450 Class
73	River Roe	Scrapped	Engines, generators and traction motors refurbished for use in 450 Class
74	River Lagan	Scrapped	Engines, generators and traction motors refurbished for use in 450 Class
75	River Main	Scrapped	Engines, generators and traction motors refurbished for use in 450 Class
76	River Inver	Scrapped	Engines, generators and traction motors refurbished for use in 450 Class
77	River Braid	Scrapped	Engines, generators and traction motors refurbished for use in 450 Class
78	River Bann	Scrapped	Engines, generators and traction motors refurbished for use in 450 Class
Buffet cars
548		Scrapped	Ex MPD buffet
550		Preserved by RPSI	Ex MPD buffet
554		Scrapped	Ex AEC buffet
Trailer cars
701		Scrapped	Brake First; Rebuilt as DBSO 1977
702		Scrapped	Brake Composite
703		Scrapped	Brake Standard; Rebuilt as DBSO 1977
711		Scrapped	Driving Brake Composite
712		Scrapped	Driving Brake Composite
713		Scrapped	Driving Brake Standard; Preserved by DCDR; Body destroyed by arson 2002 Underframe in use as a flat wagon
714		Scrapped	Driving Brake Standard
721		Scrapped	Trailer Standard
722		Scrapped	Trailer Standard
723		Scrapped	Trailer Standard
724		Scrapped	Trailer Standard
725		Scrapped	Trailer Standard
726		Scrapped	Trailer Standard
727		Scrapped	Trailer Standard
728		Preserved by DCDR	Trailer Standard; Ex MPD driving trailer
