= Meda-Ela =

Coordinates: 7°32′N 80°45′E

- Village
- Interactive map of Meda-Ela
- Country: Sri Lanka
- Province: Central Province
- Time zone: UTC+5:30 (Sri Lanka Standard Time)

Meda-Ela is a village in Central Province, Sri Lanka.

== See also ==
- List of towns in Central Province, Sri Lanka
