= Igor Meda =

Russian footballer

Personal information
- Full name: Igor Olegovich Meda
- Date of birth: 29 April 1967 (age 59)
- Height: 1.83 m (6 ft 0 in)
- Position: Defender

Senior career*
Years	Team	Apps	(Gls)
1987	FC Dynamo Armavir		
1988–1989	FC Lokomotiv Mineralnye Vody	39	(1)
1989	FC Nart Cherkessk	24	(3)
1990	FC Torpedo Armavir	18	(0)
1990–1991	FC Lokomotiv Mineralnye Vody	49	(1)
1992	FC Kuban Krasnodar	19	(0)
1993–1995	FC Krylia Sovetov Samara	45	(3)
1998–2003	FC Ural Yekaterinburg	157	(16)
- * Club domestic league appearances and goals

Igor Olegovich Meda (Russian: Игорь Олегович Меда; born 29 April 1967) is a former Russian professional footballer.

== Club career ==
He made his professional debut in the Soviet Second League in 1988 for FC Lokomotiv Mineralnye Vody.

== Full name ==
FC Krylia Sovetov Samara's official site lists his patronymic as Igor Vladimirovich and the Professional Football League lists him as Igor Olegovich.

== See also ==
- Football in Russia
