= NIR 450 Class =

Northern Irish diesel multiple unit

Northern Ireland Railways 450 Class
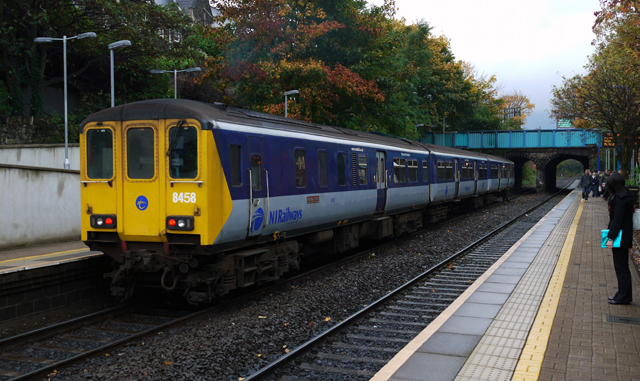
- 8458 departing City Hospital in 2009.
- In service: 1985–2012
- Manufacturer: British Rail Engineering Limited
- Family name: BR Second Generation (Mark 2 and Mark 3)
- Entered service: 1985–1987
- Scrapped: 2012–2017
- Number built: 9 sets
- Number scrapped: 8 sets
- Formation: 3-car sets (DM-T-DT)
- Fleet numbers: Originally: 451–459; Now: 8451–8459
- Capacity: 184 seats
- Operator: Northern Ireland Railways
- Lines served: At time of withdrawal: Belfast-Larne; Coleraine-Portrush; Formerly: Belfast-Bangor; Belfast-Newry

Specifications
- Maximum speed: 75 mph (121 km/h)
- Prime mover: English Electric 4SRKT
- Safety systems: AWS, TPWS
- Track gauge: 1,600 mm (5 ft 3 in)

The 450 Class is a type of diesel multiple unit (DMU) passenger train formerly used by Northern Ireland Railways. They were nicknamed 'Thumpers' and 'Castles' (or Castle Class) by rail enthusiasts.

== History ==
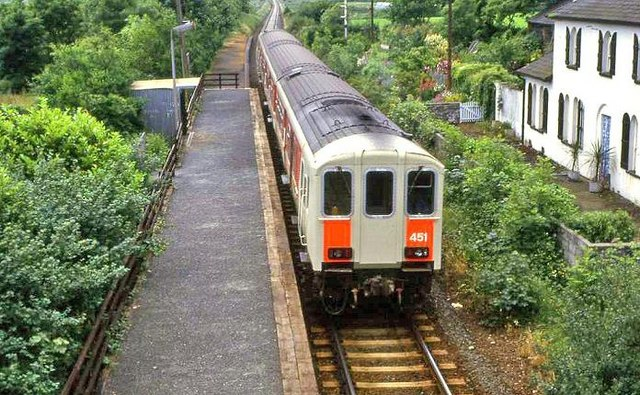
451 passing Ballycarry in 1986

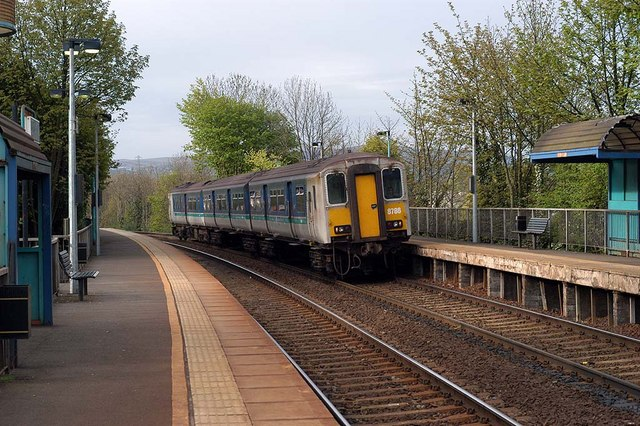
458 at Hilden on a Portadown bound service in 2004

In the mid-1980s, Northern Ireland Railways was in the process of upgrading its rolling stock. Having already purchased three new locomotives, it then proceeded to purchase replacements for its 70 Class diesel multiple units. A total of nine three-car trains were constructed by British Rail Engineering Limited, Derby, between 1985 and 1987, intended to supplement the existing 80 Class DMUs then in service. Each train consisted of a power car, a driving trailer and an intermediate trailer car. The trains were based on the British Rail Class 455 and were constructed using underframes of existing Mark 1 coaching stock, altered to using 1,600 mm (5 ft 3 in) gauge and new Mark 3 carriage bodyshells with powered sliding doors. Because of this, they bore a strong resemblance to other multiple units based on the Mark 3 bodyshell, especially those with end doors. They used refurbished power units and traction motors from the withdrawn 70 Class units (there were only eight 70 Class units available to be salvaged, so the equipment for the ninth train came from a withdrawn Class 80 train, powercar 88 that was damaged at a collision at Hilden).

The power cars of the 450 Class units were named after various Northern Irish castles. They entered service in a cream, orange, and red livery, before adopting the blue and silver livery later.

In March 1995, a 450 Class train was used to form a royal train when Queen Elizabeth II officially opened the Dargan Bridge, composed of two cars from 455 coupled to two cars from 459.

The 450 Class operated on the same principle as the prototype Class 210 DMUs on the British network, in that they consisted of a single power car containing the traction and generating equipment (numbered 45x), an intermediate trailer car (numbered 79x) and a driving trailer (numbered 78x) as permanently formed 3 car sets. An additional "8" was added to the start of all the cars so that they could be used by Translink's computer system.

After the introduction of the 3000 Class in 2005 the 450 class fleet underwent an internal refurbishment and were used on the Belfast–Larne line. This took them up to the point where they became "life-expired."

In 2011, the entire 450 Class fleet, together with the remaining 80 Class units, was listed by NI Railways for disposal. The first of the trains was broken up and scrapped in April 2012.

=== Current status ===
The entire 450 Class fleet was withdrawn from service in 2012, following the arrival of enough 4000 Class units to displace the 450 units serving the Larne Line and Portrush branch. Eight out of the nine units have been cut up for scrap. The sole remaining example has been purchased for preservation by the Downpatrick and County Down Railway.

Key:	Scrapped	Preserved

Number	Power Car Name	Intermediate Number	Driving Trailer Number	Status	Notes
451	Belfast Castle	791	781	Scrapped	Cut up at York Road. Scrapped in Ahoghill, Sunday 29 April 2012.
452	Olderfleet Castle	792	782	Scrapped	Cut up at York Road. Scrapped in Ahoghill, Sunday 22 April 2012.
453	Moiry Castle	793	783	Scrapped	Cut up at Adelaide Depot. Scrapped at Ahoghill, Tuesday 21 May 2013.
454	Carrickfergus Castle	794	784	Scrapped	Cut up at Adelaide Depot. Scrapped at Ahoghill, Monday 13 May 2013.
455	Galgorm Castle	795	785	Scrapped	Cut at Ballymena and scrapped at Ahoghill between Tuesday 31 January and Wednesday 1 February 2017.
456	Gosford Castle	796	786	Scrapped	Cut up and scrapped in Ballymena, Wednesday 1 May 2013.
457	Bangor Castle	797	787	Scrapped	Cut up at Adelaide Depot. Scrapped at Ahoghill, Monday 20 May 2013.
458	Antrim Castle	798	788	Preserved	Moved from York road depot on 27 and 28 September 2014 and is now preserved at the Downpatrick and County Down Railway.
459	Killyleagh Castle	799	789	Scrapped	Cut up at Adelaide Depot. Scrapped at Ahoghill, Wednesday 15 May 2013.

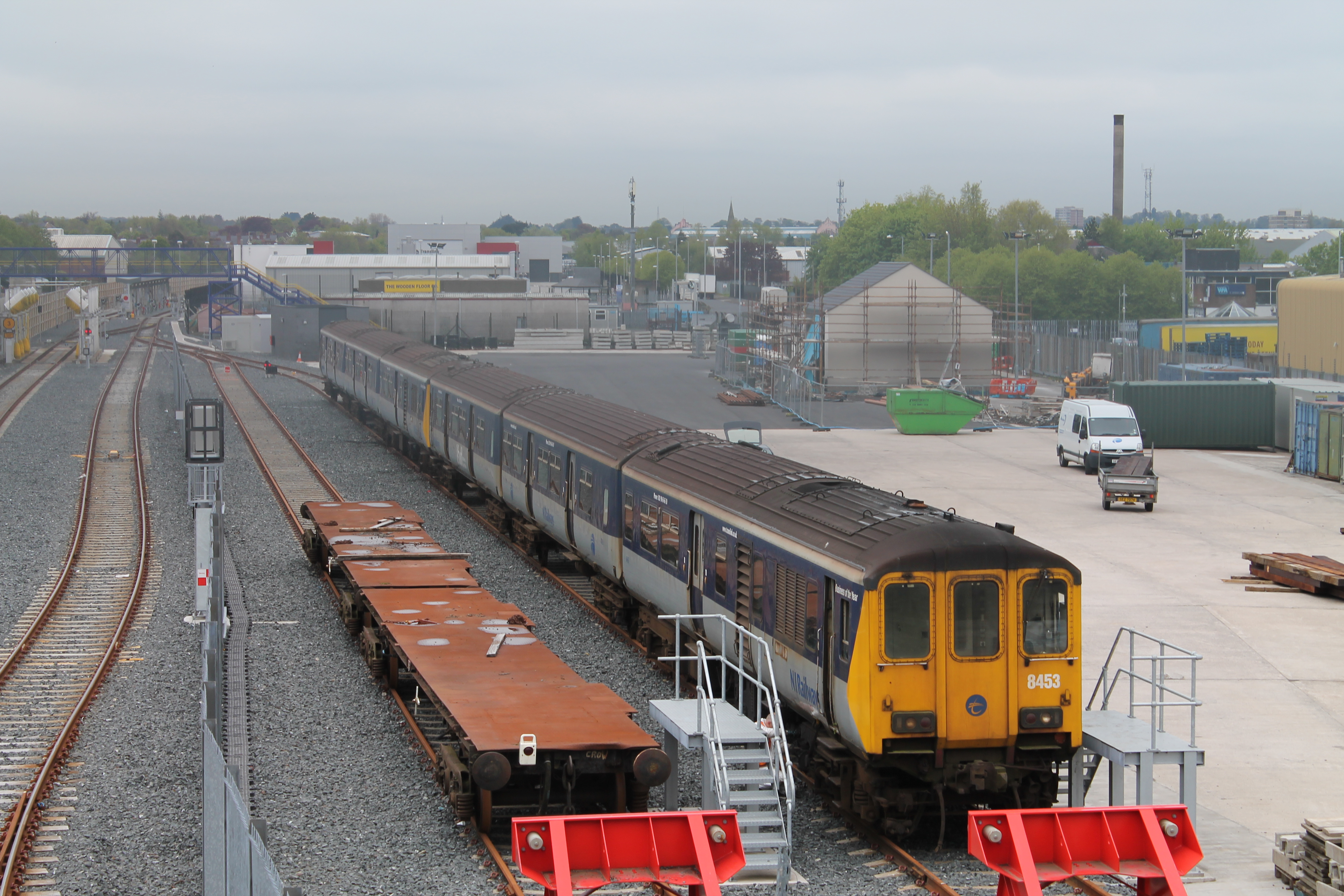
453 & 457 at Adelaide prior to scrapping in 2013

== Operations ==
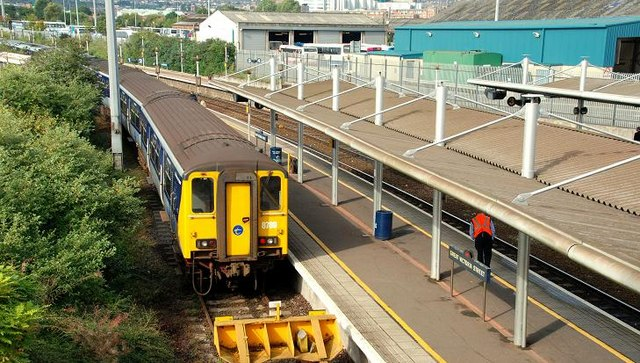
450 Class unit at Belfast Great Victoria Street in 2009

Originally they operated on suburban services on the Larne and Bangor Lines, occasionally serving the Newry Line as well, with occasional appearances on the Derry line.

With the arrival of the Class 3000 trains in 2004, the 450s still had to be retained, as the 3000s were only a like-for-like replacement of the old Class 80 units. By the year of their withdrawal, the 450 Class units had mostly been relegated to weekday services on the Larne Line and the Portrush Line shuttle, however at weekends there were enough Class 3000 trains to operate these services.

The gradual entry into service of the Class 4000 trains in 2012 saw the 450 Class units each displaced by a new Class 4000 unit as one became available, until they were all finally withdrawn.

== Fleet details ==
Class	Operator	No. Built	Year built	Cars per Set	Unit nos.
450 Class	Northern Ireland Railways	9	1985–1987	3	451–459

== In preservation ==
One example of the class has been preserved, by the Downpatrick and County Down Railway (DCDR). Unit 458 Antrim Castle was moved by road from York Road Depot, Belfast, over the weekend of 27–28 September 2014. During a two-day operation, the set was split into Driving Trailer, Intermediate and Power Car at Belfast and then, one-by-one, the carriages were taken by lorry to Downpatrick where they were reassembled. The Driving Trailer arrived on 27 September 2014, with the Intermediate and Power Car arriving the following day. The complete 458 successfully ran under its own power on 11 October 2014, and one week later on 18 October 2014, made a surprise appearance at the Irish Traction Group's Diesel Gala—the first time the unit had carried passengers since withdrawal by NIR in 2012.

The DCDR stated that it planned to convert 458 into a standby buffet train. This was completed in summer 2018, with the railcar usually being stationed at Inch Abbey station during the summer months.

In Autumn 2021, 458 was used in the filming of a season 3 episode of Derry Girls, with DCDR standing in for the Belfast–Derry and Coleraine–Portrush lines.
