= Medicine Magazine =

Chris bartlett

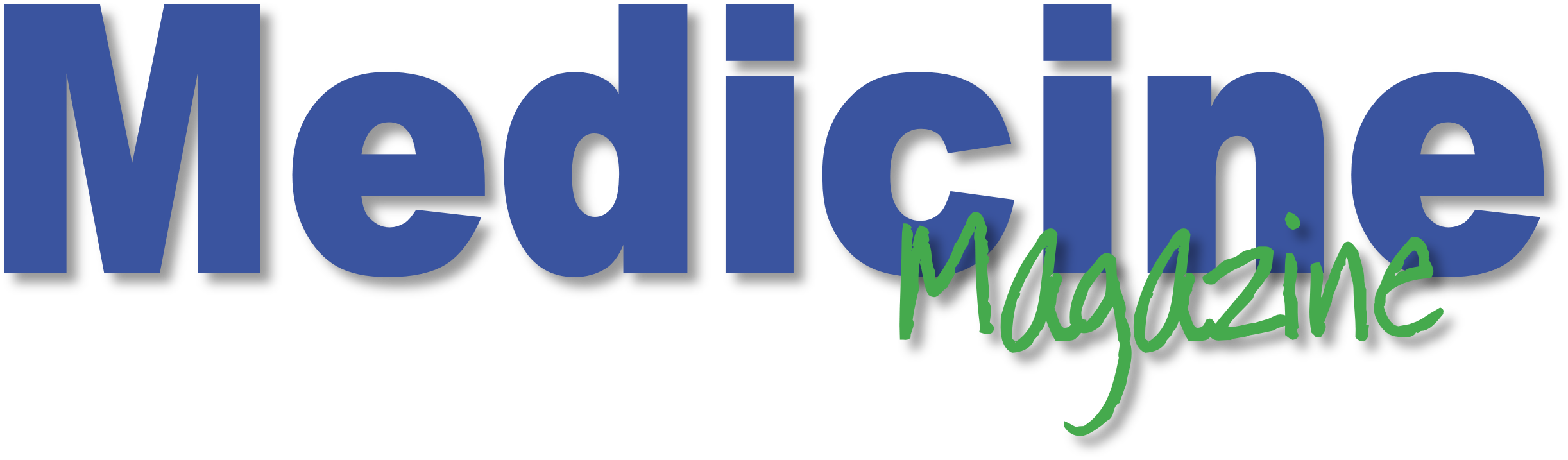
- Editor: Chris Bartlett
- Categories: Medicine
- Frequency: Bi-monthly
- Founder: Donna Desporte & Chris Bartlett
- Founded: 2007
- Final issue: 19 June 2012
- Company: Evoloji Ltd
- Country: United Kingdom
- Language: English
- Website: http://www.medicinemagazine.info/consumer

Medicine Magazine was a UK consumer magazine focused on health and medical issues. It had a more serious medical and scientific editorial than women's magazines.

The magazine was the first consumer magazine in the UK to cover in detail and compare prescription medications and surgical treatments. It also published some articles and news on its website. It ended publication on 19 June 2012.
