= Medy =

Medy is both a given name and a surname. Notable people with the name include:

- Camille Médy (1902–1989), French cross-country skier
- Medy Elito (born 1990), Zairian footballer
- Medy van der Laan (born 1968), Dutch politician

== See also ==
- Medi (disambiguation)
