= Directive 96/98/EC =

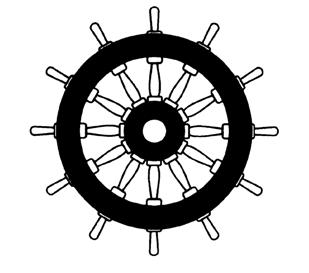
The wheel mark, used to declare conformity to the Marine Equipment Directive

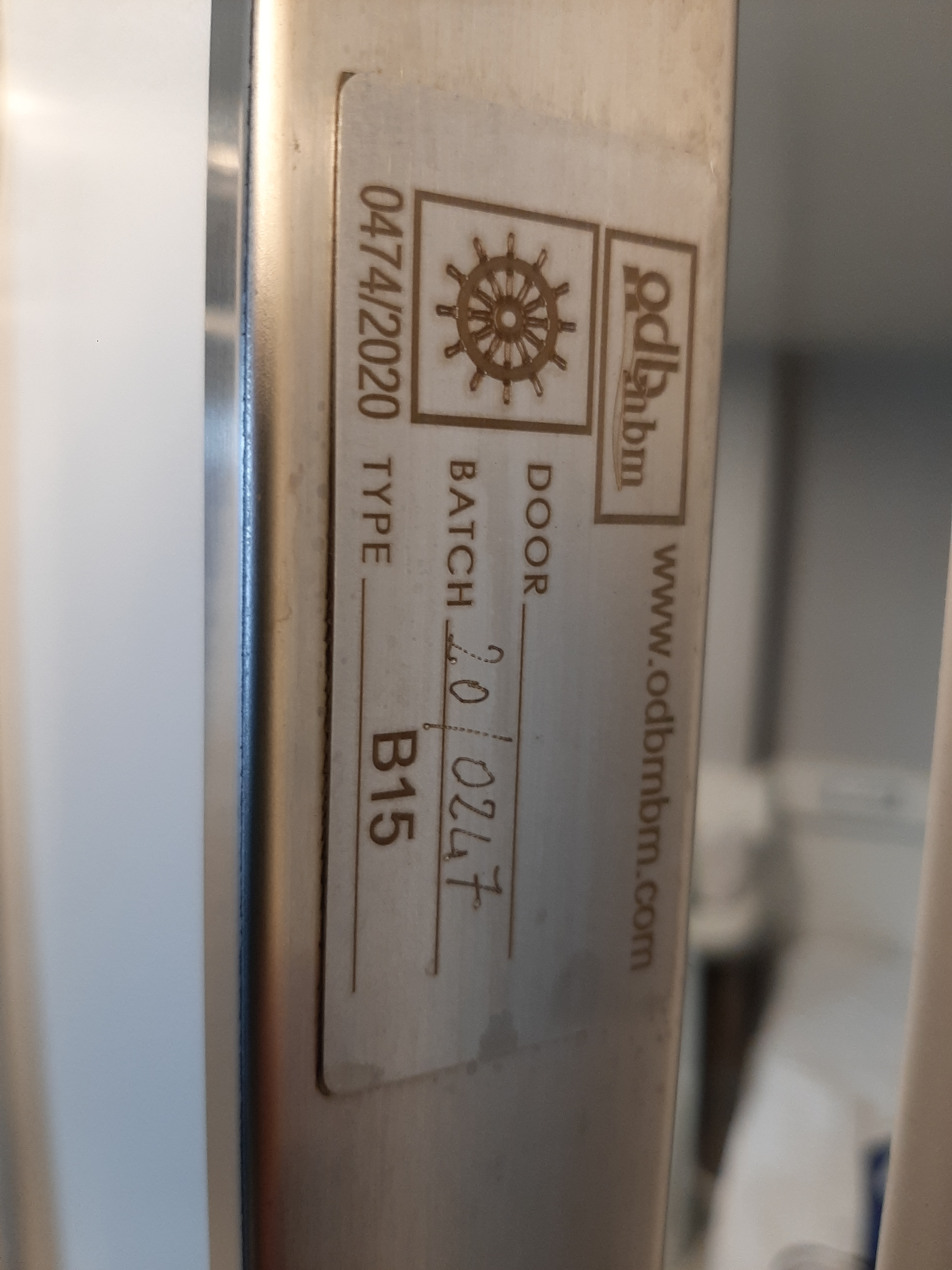
Wheel mark on an internal door of a ferry boat

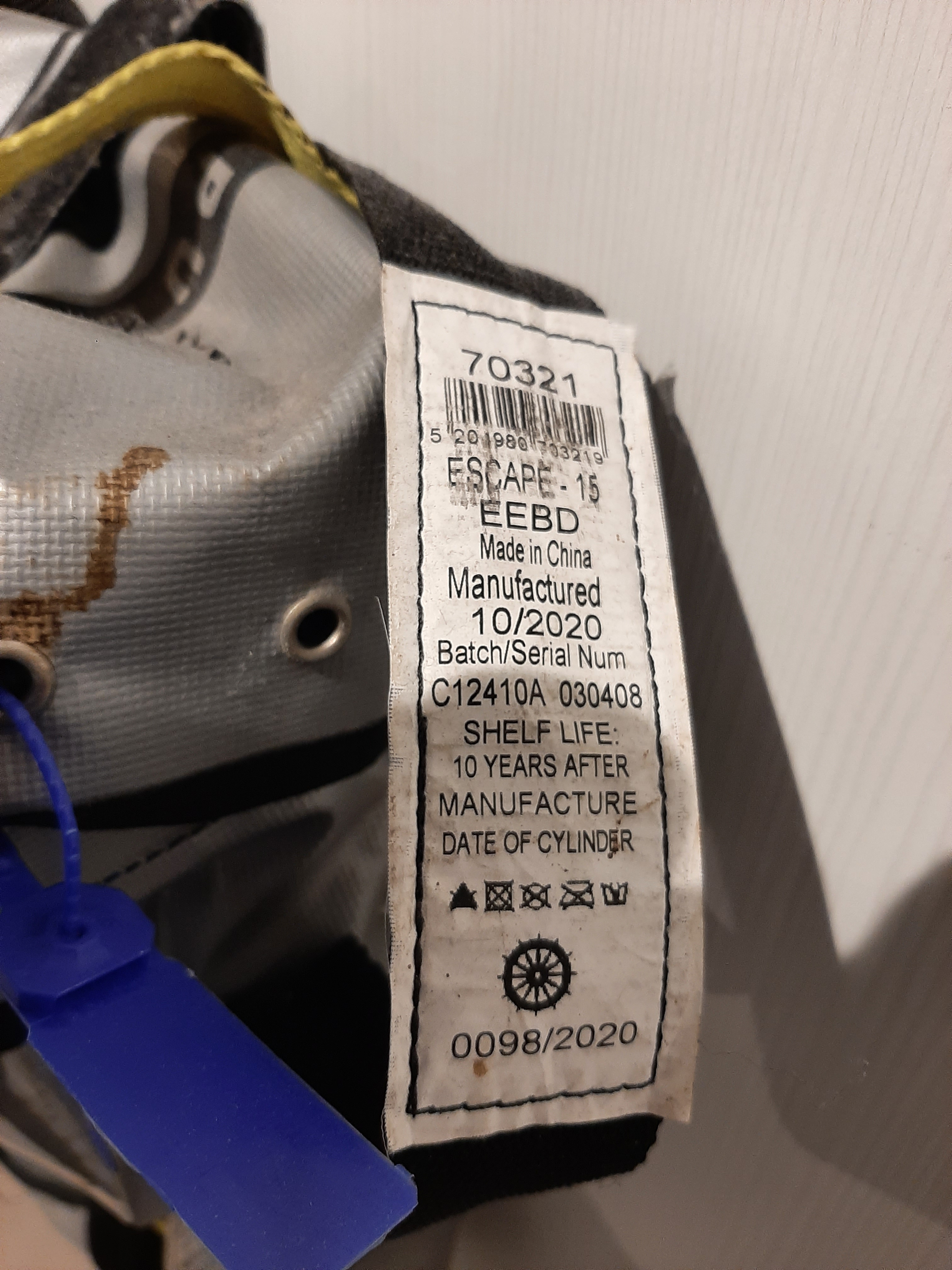
Wheel mark on emergency escape breathing device (EEBD) in a ferry boat

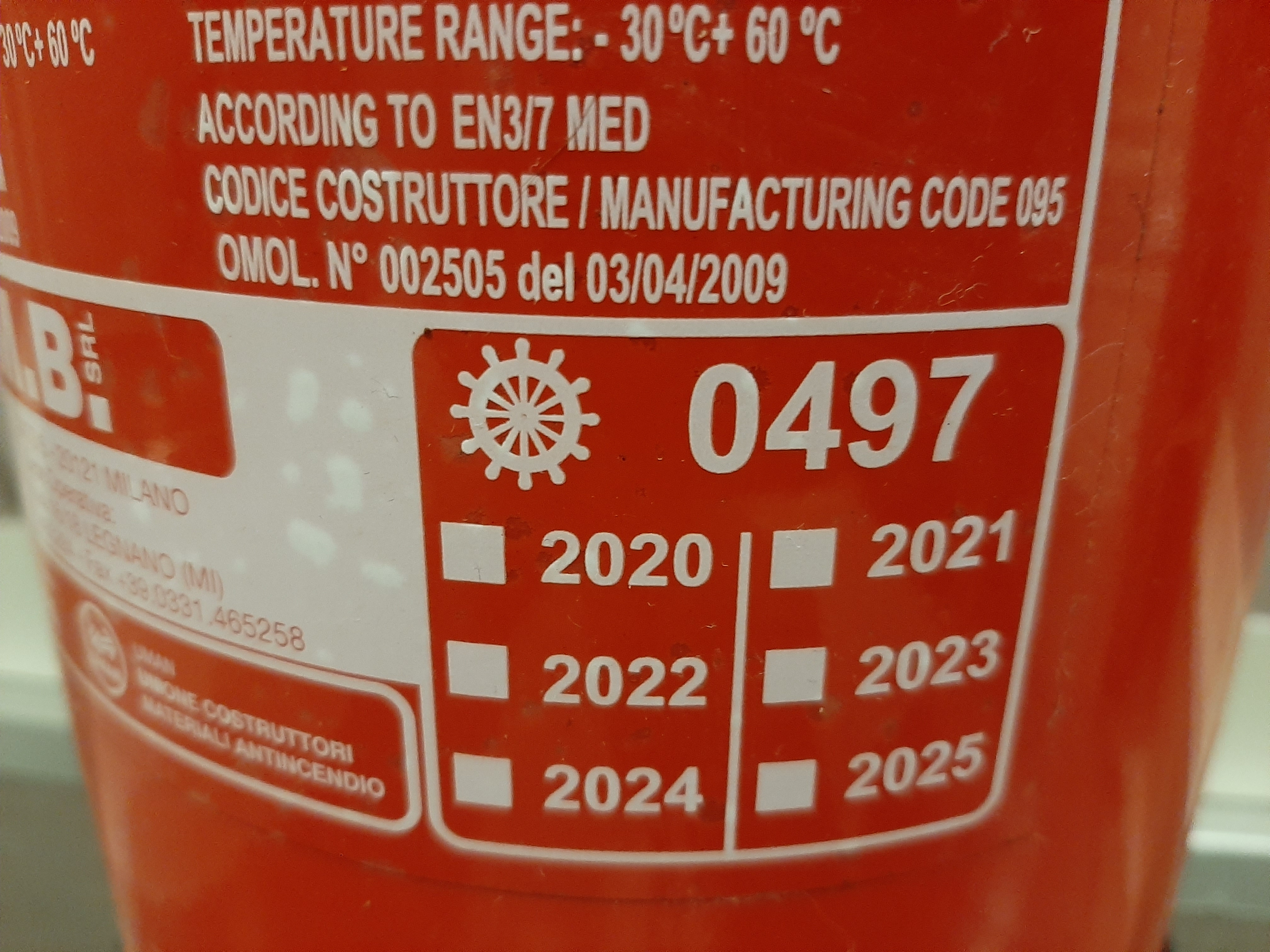
Wheel mark on a fire extinguisher, with identification number of notified body

The Marine Equipment Directive, also known as Directive 2014/90/EU, often called MED (or M.E.D.) in everyday language, is an approval of equipment and products for the Marine industry.

== Initiative of the European Commission ==
It was first introduced as Directive 96/98/EC on 20 December 1996, by the Council Directive of the European Commission (EC) in the European Union (EU).

Directive 2014/90/EU repealed Directive 96/98/EC on 18 September 2016.

EU Regulation 2024/1975 of 19 July 2024 laid down the rules for the application of Directive 2014/90/EU of the European Parliament and of the Council, as regards design, construction and performance requirements and testing standards for marine equipment and repealing Commission Implementing Regulation (EU) 2023/1667.

Items under MED approval are included in the annexes of the EU Regulation:

Annex #
1.	Life saving appliances
2.	Marine pollution prevention (equipment)
3.	Fire protection equipment
4.	Navigation equipment
5.	Radio-communication equipment
6.	Equipment required under COLREG 72 (currently only includes MED/6.1 Navigation lights)
7.	Other equipment (currently only includes MED/7.1 - Self-contained compressed-air-operated breathing apparatus for entry and work in gas-filled space)
8.	Equipment under SOLAS Chapter II-1 (currently only includes MED/8.1 - Water level detectors)
9.	Equipment not subject to MED certification (few exceptions on items listed above)

Several countries outside the EU area automatically endorse and accept products with MED approval. There is a Mutual Recognition Agreement (MRA) on Marine Equipment with the United States Coast Guard where both EU and USA will endorse each other's approved products. A continuous mutual ratification process ensures that there is alignment between the two.

== The MarED database ==
The MarED Product Database contains information about approved equipment to be installed on EU flagged merchant vessels according to the European Marine Equipment Directive. Access to the MarED Database and to the MarED website is available for the public, but limited to registered users only. The registration is free of charge.

The database contains more than 35,000 datasets about products approved under the EU Marine Equipment Directive. Also more than 5,000 datasets about products approved under the Mutual Recognition Agreement with the United States of America.

== Intention ==
The intention with the EU Marine Equipment Directive is to reduce costs for the end user by having a simplified model and not having unnecessary expenses by several classification societies or companies to do each their approvals of the same products. A classification society can simply do the classing process by looking up approved products listed in the MarED database. The classification societies does classifications according to the rules and regulations of the Flag state which rules the classification.
