= The Medic =

The Medic can refer to:

- The Medic (1916 film), a 1916 Hungarian film
- The Medic (1979 film), a 1979 French film
- The Medic, a playable class in Team Fortress 2
