= Medicine: Prep Manual for Undergraduates =

- Sixth Edition
- Editor: K.George Mathew; Praveen Aggarwal
- Author: K.George Mathew; Praveen Aggarwal
- Published: 2015 in India
- Publisher: Elsevier
- ISBN: 9788131242346

Medicine: Prep Manual for Undergraduates is a book. The first edition was edited by K G Mathew and published by Kalasala Publishers in Kerala in 1994. The fifth edition was published by Elsevier in 2015.

== Contents ==
The book explains in detail about clinical conditions. Medicine is the science and practice of the diagnosis, treatment, and prevention of disease. Medicine encompasses a variety of health care practices evolved to maintain and restore health by the prevention and treatment of illness. Contemporary medicine applies biomedical sciences, biomedical research, genetics, and medical technology to diagnose, treat, and prevent injury and disease, typically through pharmaceuticals or surgery, but also through therapies as diverse as psychotherapy, external splints and traction, medical devices, biologics, and ionizing radiation, amongst others.
