= Medicate (disambiguation) =

"Medicate" is a song by AFI from their album Crash Love.

Medicate may also refer to:

- "Medicate" (Gabbie Hanna song)
- "Medicate", a song by Breaking Benjamin from the album Saturate
- "Medicate", a song by Luna Halo from their self-titled album
