= Medecin =

Médecin or Médécin (French for physician) is the surname of:

- Edmond Médécin (1898–1951), Monegasque sprinter
- Jacques Médecin (1928–1998), French politician, son of Jean Médecin
- Jean Médecin (1890–1965), French lawyer and politician
- Julien Médécin (1894–1986), Monegasque architect
