= UTA MPD =

Northern Irish diesel powered railcar, in service from 1957 to 1983

Ulster Transport Authority Multi-Purpose Diesel
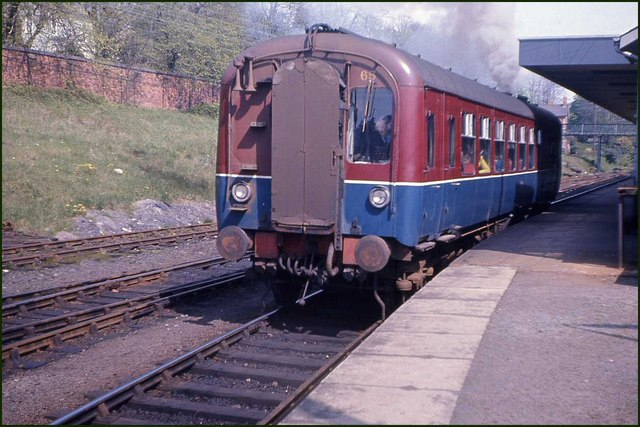
- MPD double-ended railcar no. 65 at Lisburn in June 1974
- In service: 1957–1983
- Manufacturer: UTA York Road
- Number built: 29 power cars, 18 trailers
- Formation: 1 or 2 cars per set
- Fleet numbers: Power cars: 36–65
- Operators: Ulster Transport Authority; Northern Ireland Railways

Specifications
- Maximum speed: 70 mph (113 km/h)
- Prime mover(s): Leyland
- Power output: 275 hp (205 kW)
- Track gauge: 1,600 mm (5 ft 3 in)

The Ulster Transport Authority Multi-Purpose Diesel (UTA MPD) was a diesel powered railcar, used in Northern Ireland. It was developed by the Ulster Transport Authority (UTA) as a progression of the earlier Multi-engined Diesel (MED). The MED concept, while suitable for short commuter links, was not considered so for the Northern Counties Committee section, with its main line from Belfast to Derry where speeds of up to 110 km/h (68 mph) were required. A new railcar development was needed, and the MED was superseded by the MPD.

== History ==
The new railcars were to operate on the former ‘broad gauge’ lines of the NCC which not only covered suburban services in and around Belfast, but also the 152-kilometre (94 mi) long main line from that city to Derry.

The "new" trains, just as with the earlier MEDs, were converted from existing locomotive-hauled stock. These became known as Multi-Purpose Diesel (MPD) railcars and were built between 1957 and 1962. The first ten power cars being intended for the Derry line trains, with the others being for the Belfast local services. The power cars were originally fitted with a 275 hp (205 kW) Leyland engine, mounted beneath the chassis and driving both axles on the rear bogie through a torque converter. However problems were encountered with these engines and, in the mid-1960s, it was decided to re-engine 12 cars with 260 hp (190 kW) AEC engines and a further 17 with 275-hp engines from Rolls-Royce Limited.

The Belfast - Derry express services, for which the first ten MPDs were built, called for a high power/weight ratio and, on occasion, saw the five-coach train formation made up of four power cars with a restaurant car. On local services the power cars operated with trailers. Their hydraulic transmission made them suitable for hauling significant trailing loads, and they were used - usually in multiple - to haul goods trains on the former NCC section, replacing steam locomotives.

One of the power cars was destroyed when No. 58 suffered a collision with a motor vehicle on a level crossing in July 1958, being written off and scrapped after just six weeks in service.

== Numbering ==
The numbering sequence followed on from the MEDs, the single-cab power cars being numbered from 36 to 62 inclusive (27 cars), those with a cab at both ends from 63 to 65 inclusive (three cars).

The power cars numbered 46 to 53 inclusive, were originally non-gangwayed but were rebuilt on their works visits between 1968 and 1970. The last of the single-cab power cars was withdrawn in 1981, the double-cab vehicles lasting a little longer. Nos. 63 and 65 withdrawn in 1981, No. 64 in 1983.

There were 18 trailer cars numbered between 529 and 550:

- 529-534, 540, 541, 542 gangwayed driving trailers with cab at one end.
- 535-539 and 543 non gangwayed driving trailers with cab at one end rebuilt as gangwayed non driving trailers 1968-1970
- 548 549 550 buffet cars
- 548 could also work with 70 class sets
- 550 was converted to a 70 class car in 1966

== Preservation ==
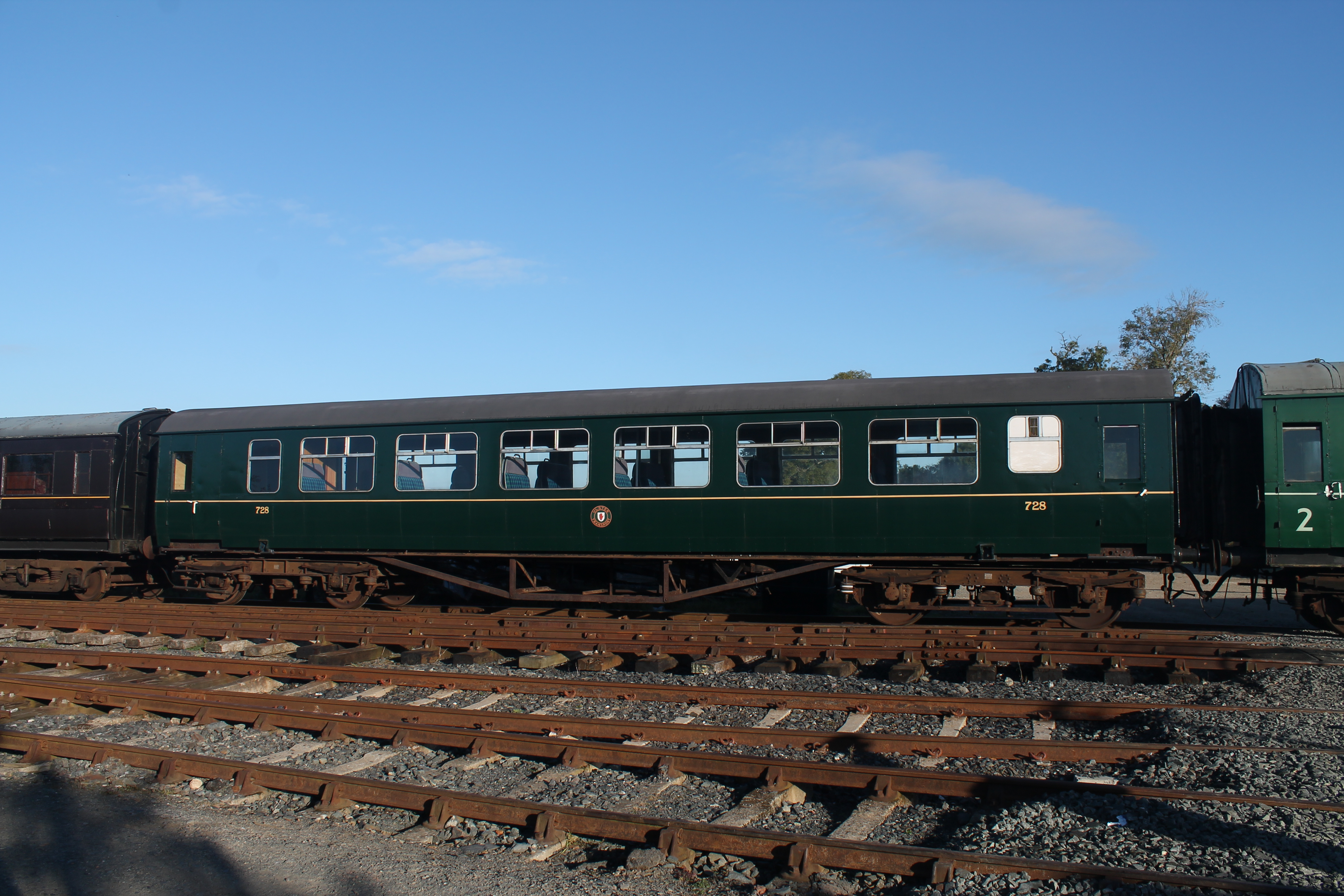
Car number 728 at the Downpatrick and County Down Railway station in October 2015

Buffet Car 550 entered preservation in 1978 with the Railway Preservation Society of Ireland, whereupon it regained its original UTA number, 87, and was painted in LMS NCC livery. No. 728, preserved at the Downpatrick and County Down Railway was formerly an MPD driving trailer.
