= Irish AEC railcars =

Córas Iompair Éireann 2600 Class GNRI 600 Class
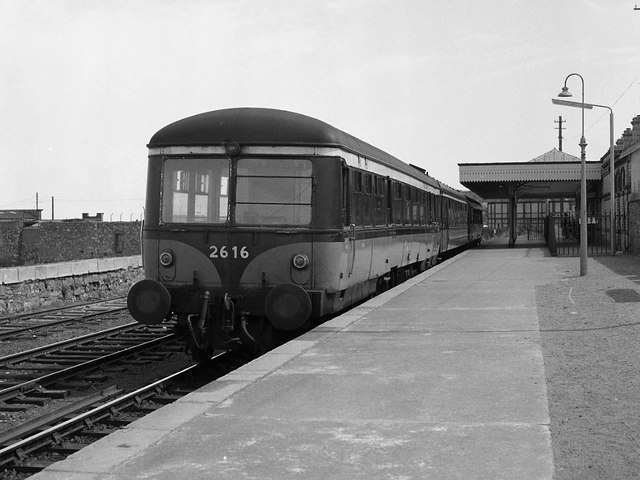
- 2616 & 2651 at Howth in 1975.

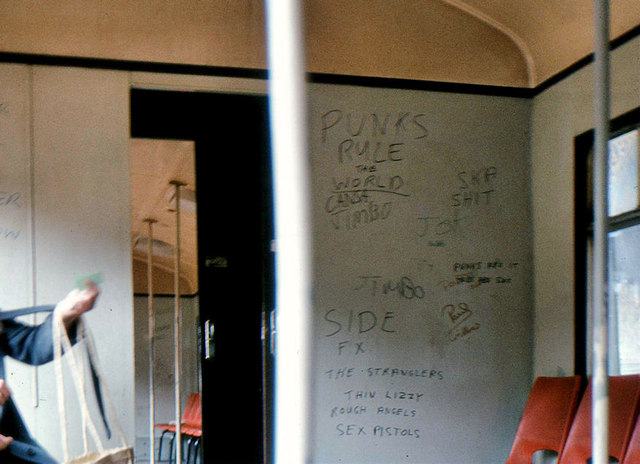
- Interior of a push–pull vehicle at Drogheda in June 1980 with plastic chairs and graffiti
- In service: 1950–1975 as railcars; 1972–1987 as push–pull stock
- Manufacturers: Associated Equipment Company; Park Royal Vehicles; CIÉ Inchicore Works
- Replaced: Steam locomotives and carriages
- Constructed: 1950–1956
- Entered service: 1950–1957
- Refurbished: Most cars rebuilt to push–pull stock, 1971–1974
- Scrapped: 1968–1987
- Number built: 85 sets
- Number preserved: 1 driving trailer
- Number scrapped: 84 sets
- Successor: 8100 Class
- Formation: 2–8 cars (maximum 4 power cars)
- Fleet numbers: 601–619; 2600–2665
- Capacity: 44–91 seats per power car, depending on arrangement
- Operators: Great Northern Railway (Ireland); Ulster Transport Authority; Northern Ireland Railways; Córas Iompair Éireann

Specifications
- Car body construction: Steel on timber framing
- Car length: 62 feet 6 inches (19.05 m)
- Width: 9 feet 6 inches (2.90 m)
- Height: 12 feet 6 inches (3.81 m)
- Maximum speed: 120 km/h (75 mph)
- Weight: 38.5 long tons (39.1 t) (single power car)
- Prime mover: Two AEC A215 in each power car
- Power output: 250 brake horsepower (190 kW) per power car
- Transmission: Mechanical; five-speed preselector gearbox
- HVAC: Steam heating
- UIC classification: 1A′A1′
- Braking system: Vacuum
- Coupling system: Screw
- Track gauge: 1,600 mm (5 ft 3 in), see Rail gauge in Ireland

The Irish AEC railcars were Associated Equipment Company (AEC)–engined diesel multiple units (normally termed railcars in Ireland) that operated InterCity and suburban services on the Irish railway system between 1950 and 1975. Many CIÉ examples were later converted for push–pull operation with diesel locomotives, finally being withdrawn when displaced by the electric Dublin Area Rapid Transit service in the mid-1980s.

== Background ==
The first single-unit diesel railcars in Ireland were introduced on the narrow-gauge County Donegal and Clogher Valley railways in the early 1930s. The Great Northern Railway and Northern Counties Committee followed shortly thereafter. However, early railcar trains did not exceed two cars in length. Early in 1948, the GNR(I) ordered a fleet of 20 railcars to cut costs, capable of operating in pairs with one or two intermediate trailer cars, from AEC. Introduced in 1950 and 1951, these vehicles drew on AEC's experience with the Great Western Railway's pre-war railcars. The cars combined AEC diesel engines (two per car, each of 125 bhp (93 kW)) with bodywork by Park Royal Vehicles. CIÉ had been interested in railcars since its inception in 1945, but an initial plan for a four-car diesel-electric unit was cancelled. However, the success of the GNR(I) cars and the 1948 Milne Report's recommendations in favour of railcars (but not diesel locomotives) encouraged the company to place a large-scale order with AEC in September 1950. (Note also that 10 of the 20 GNR(I) AEC cars were inherited by CIÉ on the Great Northern's dissolution in 1958, along with 10 of 24 later cars built by the Great Northern Railway Board on British United Traction (BUT) underframes; the remainder went to the Ulster Transport Authority.)

== The CIÉ fleet ==
=== Initial order ===
In 1951, CIÉ ordered a series of 60 cars similar to the GNR(I) examples, again combining AEC engines and Park Royal bodywork. These vehicles were almost identical to the GNR(I) units but incorporated improvements derived from experience with the latter; most notably, up to four power cars, rather than two, could operate in multiple. They were delivered between March 1952 and September 1954 and numbered in the series 2600–2659.

=== Bulleid cars ===
Six additional cars (2660–2665) were ordered in August 1954. Delivered in 1956, they were mechanically identical to the earlier vehicles—although the engines were now designated as BUT, rather than AEC, products. However, the cars' bodywork was constructed at CIÉ's Inchicore Works to a distinctive design by the company's Chief Mechanical Engineer, Oliver Bulleid. (It may be noted that CIÉ had faced political pressure to build the bodywork of the original cars itself, rather than importing complete vehicles.) Although the cars' length and width were identical to those of their predecessors, they were distinguished by flat sides and a high, flat front end. Even-numbered cars had the standard composite (two-class) seating arrangement, whereas odd-numbered ones had a single-class layout. The Bulleid cars had a short career in their original form, soon being rebuilt as powered intermediates (see below).

=== Trailer cars ===
Various carriages were fitted or retrofitted with jumper cables to allow their operation in a railcar train. There were at least 88 trailers in total, including pre-1950s stock (one example dating from 1902), 1950s CIÉ vehicles, other 1950s stock from Park Royal Vehicles (manufacturer of the railcars' own bodywork) and 1960s Cravens vehicles.

Examples included three composite (i.e. two-class) vehicles specially modified to work as through Cork–Belfast coaches on the Enterprise, and 14 buffet cars capable of functioning either as a conventional buffet car (in which passengers consumed their food in the car itself) in locomotive-hauled trains, or as a kitchen vehicle with ordinary seating in railcar trains (whose passengers were served food at their seats, either in the car or elsewhere in the train) which were built in 1953 and 1954. Trailers generally ran between a pair of power cars, although there were a number of driving trailers, described below; additionally, ordinary trailers were sometimes marshalled at the tail of a train, particularly in the 2600s' early days.

Two special Park Royal trailer vehicles for service on the isolated Waterford and Tramore Railway were built in 1955. These vehicles, like the railcars they worked with, had high-density seating arrangements. One of them was, additionally, fitted out as a driving trailer, with a guard's compartment at the non-cab end and a large area set aside for prams. Two further driving trailers, known as "mules," were converted from 1953-built hauled stock but were used only briefly, working as part of the Westport portion of a Dublin–Galway/Westport train.

== Description ==
The 2600 Class were effectively identical to the GNR(I) cars in overall configuration, having a full-width driver's cab at one end, a gangway at the other, and underfloor engines. Their bodywork was conventional for CIÉ stock of the time, consisting of steel panels on timber framing. The underframe was of steel channel construction.

=== Mechanical ===
The 2600s shared the engines and transmission of their GNR(I) predecessors, having two 250 brake horsepower (190 kW), 9.6-litre, six-cylinder, four-stroke engines driving the inner axles of the two bogies via fluid flywheels and Self-Changing Gears five-speed preselector gearboxes, with cardan shafts driving forward/reverse gearboxes on the ends of the axles. Multiple working was via 24-core jumper cables. The cars were fitted with two parallel vacuum brake systems—a conventional system and a second high-vacuum, quick-release system, based on reservoirs in which a vacuum was continually maintained, for use on services with frequent stops. Steam heating was originally fitted; even-numbered cars had a boiler in the guard's compartment, capable of supplying steam for up to four cars. Cars used on suburban services were subsequently fitted with a bus-type heating system that used the engines' cooling water.

=== Seating layout ===
Almost all the cars were delivered with a two-class layout. A 12-seat first class saloon was located at the cab end of the car, a glazed partition behind the cab permitting forward (or rearward) views through the windscreen. A 32-seat second class (known as third class until 1956) saloon was positioned towards the gangway end, and there was also a guard's compartment and, in cars 2600–2647, a toilet. Cars 2648–2657 were intended for suburban use and devoid of toilets, permitting an extra four second class seats; apart from a lack of tables, they were otherwise identical to cars intended for longer-distance service. However, odd-numbered cars in this series subsequently had their guard's compartments removed to provide additional seating. Exceptionally, two cars (2658–2659) for use on the Waterford and Tramore Railway were delivered with high-density, single-class (although still divided into two saloons) layouts without toilets; the guard's compartment was also omitted from one car. Special trailer cars (see above) with similar high-density layouts operated with them. Most other cars were refitted with high-density, single-class layouts in the 1960s and early 1970s; these layouts seated between 70 and 91, depending on whether the toilet, guard's compartment or both were retained.

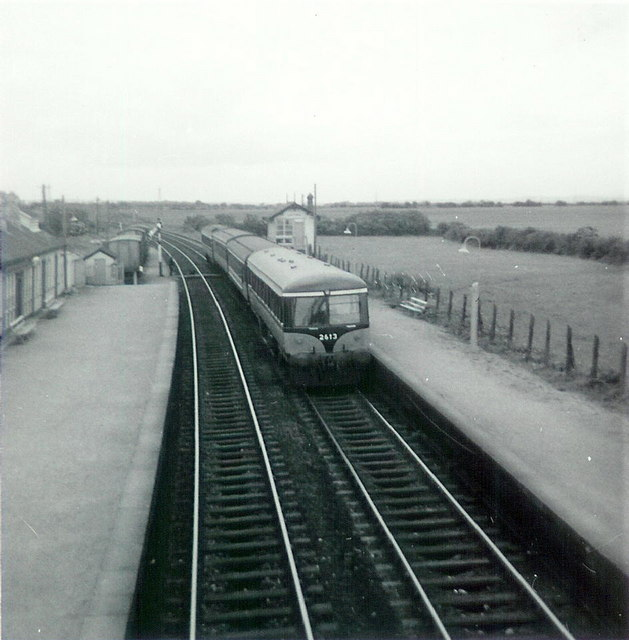
Car 2613 heads a railcar set entering Laytown in July 1970

== Career as railcars ==
=== GNRI units ===
Although limited to four coaches, the AEC's were put in service on the Dublin – Belfast Enterprise service. As a result, these units had the distinction of being the first successful main line diesel railcars in either Ireland or Britain.

Upon dissolution of the GNR in 1958, 10 AEC's went to CIÉ (Where they joined the existing fleet of AEC railcars, with each vehicle number receiving an 'n' suffix), and 10 went to the UTA. The UTA had experimented with AEC railcars in 1951 as well, turning out two power cars, No.'s 6 and 7. The former GNR's AEC's (Now renumbered 111 -120) were technically compatible with 6 and 7.

All 20 were scrapped during the 1970s- CIÉ's inherited 10 were not suitable for conversion to push-pull like their original 60, and were cut up in Mullingar in 1975. The UTA's inherited 10 were subsequently inherited by NIR in 1968 and withdrawn by their new owners in 1972.

=== CIÉ units ===
When originally delivered, the railcars were employed on mainline express trains, including crack workings such as a three-hour nonstop service between Dublin and Cork. Eight-car formations were commonly deployed on these duties, sometimes splitting en route to serve (for example) Tralee and Cork or Galway and Westport. By 1954, they were also operating on longer secondary and branch routes, such as the Cork–Bantry and the two Dublin–Bray lines serving Ameins Street and Harcourt Street. However, the arrival of diesel locomotives from 1955 onwards displaced the mainline 2600s to secondary workings.

Moreover, the fact that CIÉ operated its railcars in four-car (two power cars, two trailers) or eight-car (four power cars, four trailers) sets, whereas the Great Northern—and, in general, its successor in Northern Ireland, the Ulster Transport Authority—used its near-identical vehicles in two-car (both power cars) or three-car (two power cars, one trailer) sets, meant that the 2600s had a poor power-to-weight ratio. One solution initially employed at busy times was to operate certain trains in a so-called "6+2" formation, comprising a power car, four intermediate trailers (usually including a dining car) and a second power car—thus giving passenger access throughout all six cars—followed by two extra power cars which were normally locked and inaccessible to passengers. From 1961, this arrangement was superseded by the use of powered intermediate cars, discussed below. By 1969, although suburban workings on "the relatively flat sections around Dublin" were formed of two power cars and two trailers, the remaining mainline workings used two-car sets.

Additionally, obtaining spare parts proved troublesome as the railcars aged. As early as 1968, the AEC engines were considered obsolete, and spares were "virtually impossible" to obtain, forcing CIÉ to cannibalise some of the 2600s to keep the remainder running.

In 1969, the only mainline services remaining railcar-operated were one round trip per day on each of the Sligo–Dublin and Dublin–Rosslare routes. The last mainline working was on the Dublin–Rosslare route in April 1970. By 1971, conversions of the cars to push–pull stock had begun. Early in 1972, it was reported that only a small railcar fleet would be retained in operational condition, pending the introduction of the push–pull trains. In late 1974, eight cars were reportedly being kept operational to address a shortage of locomotives "by reason of damage by accidents and bomb incidents." The last five railcars were withdrawn on 20 September 1975. Ten of the 2600 Class, along with 19 of the AEC and BUT cars inherited from the Great Northern, were broken up rather than converted to push–pull stock.

=== Powered intermediates and other modifications ===
Cars 2614, 2617 and 2656 from the original fleet were rebuilt following severe collision or fire damage. Cars 2614 and 2617 were returned to service in 1960 with new bodies whose sides resembled the Bulleid cars' but whose ends were similar to those of the original batch. These cars were further rebuilt in 1961, this time along with 2656 and all the Bulleid cars, into "powered intermediates" with engines but not cabs, which were renumbered into the 2660 series. Odd-numbered powered intermediates seated 60, while even-numbered cars had 52 seats and a guard's compartment. The cars were substituted for trailer vehicles in certain trains, improving the trains' power-to-weight ratio. Other cars underwent changes in the seating layout, discussed above, as they were reassigned from long-distance to suburban service.

== Career as push–pull stock ==
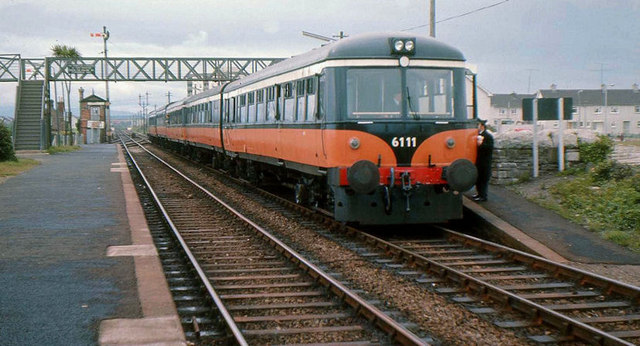
A push-pull train of former 2600 Class railcars at Howth Junction.

In 1971, with the process of modifying railcars for suburban operations still underway, work began on the first conversions to push–pull stock for service with the then recently re-engined 201 Class locomotives. The conversion was intended to address both the cars' poor power-to-weight ratio and the increasing difficulties in obtaining spare parts for their engines. The first test runs were made on the Dublin–Cork line in mid-February 1972. Trials on the Dublin suburban lines commenced in June 1972, and sets began entering service in February 1973. Operation on the Cork–Cobh line was also considered at one point.

=== Car types and train formations ===
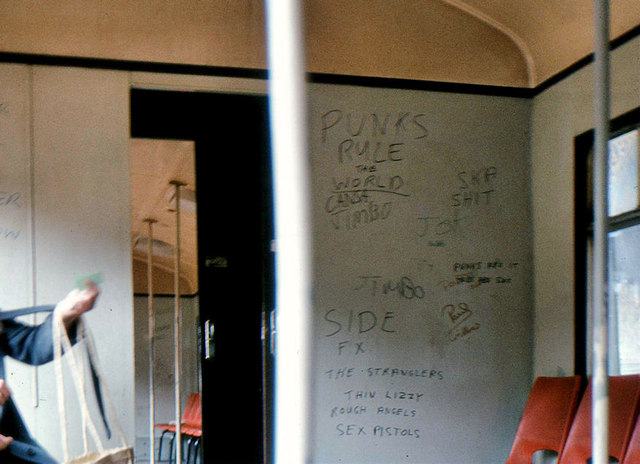
Inside a push–pull vehicle at Drogheda in June 1980; note plastic chairs and period graffiti

There were four types of push–pull vehicle:

- Driving trailers, also known as "control cars" and numbered in the 61xx series, retained an operative cab and were marshalled at the end of the train remote from the locomotive. The cab retained most of the original (diesel-mechanical) railcar controls, which were modified to control the (diesel-electric) locomotive; for instance, the gear selector became the eight-notch power control. The guard's compartment contained a boiler for train heating and a diesel generator set to supply lights and boiler auxiliaries; because the generator blocked one of the compartment's doors, the guard normally travelled in the corresponding compartment of the connector car.
- Connector cars, numbered in the 62xx series, were marshalled with their cabs (which were converted to vestibules, the windscreens being blanked off) next to the locomotive, to which they were connected with special control couplings. The purpose of the connector cars was to "convert the signals from the former railcar controls on the control car into a form which can be received and acted upon by the control equipment on the loco." The cars also contained guard's compartments, which retained their heating boilers; however, as noted above, only the boiler in the driving trailer was normally used, whereas the location of the generator set in that car forced the guard to travel in the (normally unheated) compartment in the connector car.
- Intermediate cars of the most common type, numbered in the 63xx series, were semi-permanently coupled in pairs at their (again inoperative) cab ends and marshalled in the middle of a set, their gangwayed ends being coupled to those of the control and connector cars to form a four-car consist.
- Other, less numerous intermediates, confusingly interspersed with the other type within the 63xx series, were converted from railcar powered intermediates and, thus, had a gangway at each end and no cab. These vehicles could be marshalled between a driving trailer or connector car and an intermediate of the first type to give a five-car set.

All cars' toilets were removed. There were originally nine five-car and three four-car sets. The first sets to enter service had the locomotive at the north end, but later ones were marshalled with the locomotive at the south end; the earlier sets were then turned on the triangle at Limerick Junction to standardise the position. However, the number of available driving trailers declined due to a spate of fires (at one stage, a "spare man" travelled in each driving trailer's generator compartment to detect and extinguish fires) and the fatal collision at Gormanston in 1974. There were only six driving trailers available by 1982; conventional locomotive haulage was, thus, often substituted for push–pull operation.

The push–pull sets were "not very attractive and were not very comfortable", particularly due to ride problems arising from the vehicles' reduced weight compared to the original railcars. However, they "were cheap and could be quickly produced" and survived, "deeply unloved by those travelling," until (and, in some cases beyond) electrification.

=== Further seating modifications ===
Although the railcars had already received high-density seating, overcrowding of the push–pull trains was such that the transverse seats were replaced by longitudinal ones to give more standing room. Notoriously, the seating provided was similar to contemporaneous plastic stacking chairs in dingy shades of green and orange. In 1980, the driving trailers and connector cars typically had 58 seats, the standard intermediates 70 and the former powered intermediates 66; however, there were minor variations among the individual cars. Yet another modification took place in early 1984, when some cars intended for retention after electrification received "more comfortable seating." This consisted of the then standard class high backed bench seats, seating three and two passengers respectively. The seats were upholstered in blue moquette with a vinyl headrest running along the top of the bench.

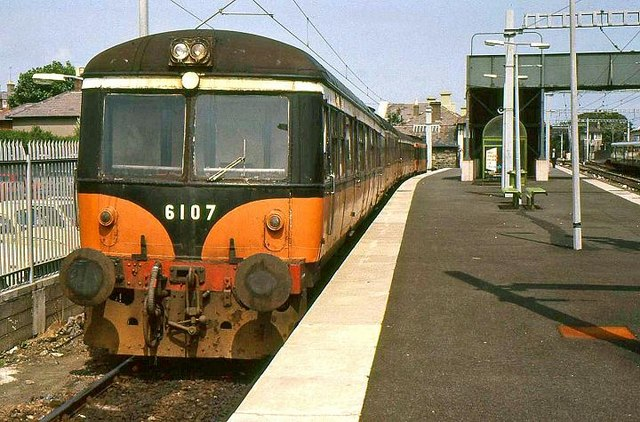
The Greystones shuttle, headed by driving trailer 6107, at Bray in July 1986

== Final withdrawal ==
At the end of February 1984, five months before the inauguration of DART, only four sets remained. Most vehicles were withdrawn soon after electric services began (as they were replaced by the 8100 Class DART's); by 1985, there were only two sets of three cars each, one set used to provide a shuttle service between Bray and Greystones and the other as a spare. One of these sets was withdrawn in 1986, the other surviving to pass into Iarnród Éireann ownership in February 1987 and managing to outlast its normal motive power; the remaining 201 Class locomotives were withdrawn in 1986, and 121 Class locomotives were used thereafter. (Locomotive 121, then numbered B121, had undergone trials with push–pull stock as early as 1973.) During Hurricane Charley in August 1986, the shuttle train was even used to stand in for electric trains on the partially flooded main Dublin–Bray line. However, the shuttle was withdrawn in mid-September 1987, due to the poor condition of the rolling stock (the service was resumed at the end of October, using an 80 Class train hired from Northern Ireland Railways).

=== Reuse of number series ===
Both the number series originally carried by the railcars and that used for the push–pull conversions have been reused. Iarnród Éireann's first order of diesel multiple units, from Tokyu Car Corporation of Japan, received numbers in the 26xx series when delivered in 1994. Previously, the 61xx and 63xx series had been used, respectively, for driving and intermediate push–pull cars based on the British Rail Mark 3 design.

== Disposal and preservation ==
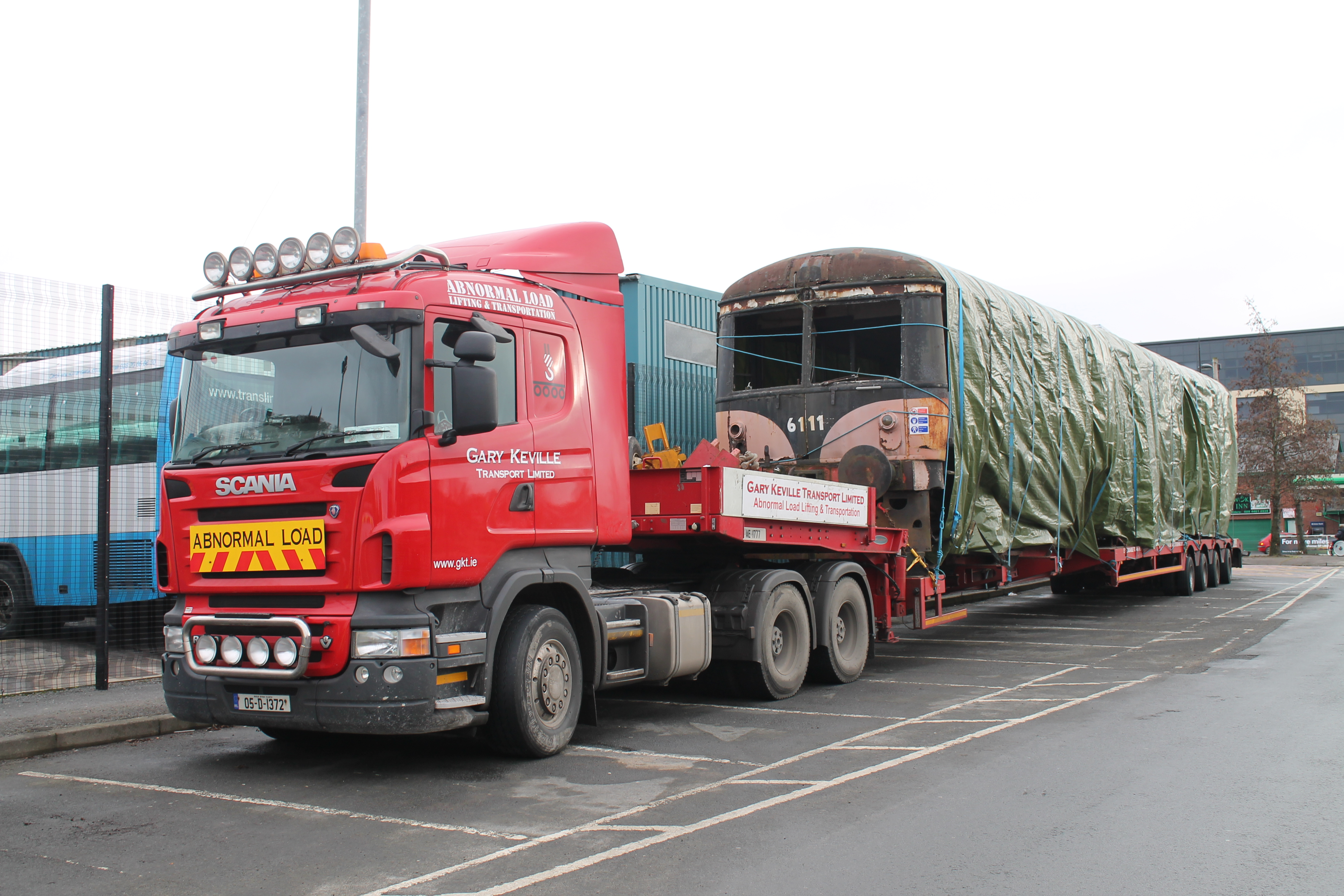
6111 Arriving at Downpatrick

Almost all the push–pull vehicles were scrapped at Mullingar or Dundalk. One, driving trailer 6111 (the former railcar 2624), was set aside for possible preservation. It remained at Inchicore in a derelict condition until 7 February 2015, when it was purchased by and moved to the Downpatrick and County Down Railway. It is now undergoing restoration.
