= UTA MED =

Ulster Transport Authority Multi-Engined Diesel
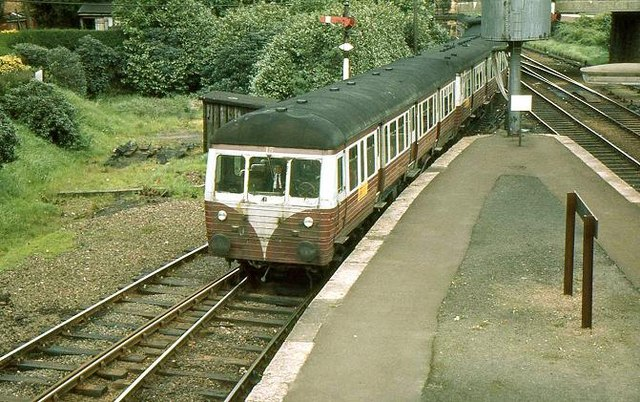
- A MED set arriving at Lisburn railway station in May 1976
- In service: 1952–1978
- Manufacturer: UTA Duncrue Street
- Replaced: Steam locomotives and carriages
- Constructed: 1951–1952
- Number built: 28 power cars, 15 trailers
- Number scrapped: All
- Formation: 3 cars per set
- Fleet numbers: Power cars: 8–35
- Operators: Ulster Transport Authority; Northern Ireland Railways

Specifications
- Maximum speed: 70 mph (113 km/h)
- Prime mover(s): Associated Equipment Company; Leyland
- Power output: 165 hp (123 kW)
- Track gauge: 1,600 mm (5 ft 3 in)

The Ulster Transport Authority Multi-Engined Diesel (UTA MED) was an early diesel powered railcar, used in Northern Ireland. The 12-mile Belfast-Bangor railway line had a well used passenger service and, being devoid of goods traffic, was chosen as the testing ground for the diesel railcar era. Before deciding to build its own railcars the UTA conducted an experiment by borrowing from the GNR(I). This was considered such a success that the UTA constructed its own experimental three-coach diesel railcar set at its Duncrue Street works, this being outshopped in late Spring 1951, ready for testing and driver training.

== History ==
The prototype train was converted from conventional locomotive-hauled stock and consisted of two power cars with an intermediate, but non-powered trailer car. Each of the power cars was fitted with two under-floor AEC engines, and all the vehicles were substantially internally rebuilt, and fitted with power-operated sliding doors. The prototype Multi-engined Diesel (MED) trains went into revenue-earning service in March 1952.

To continue its plans for dieselisation the UTA, over the following two years, built another 14 three-car trains in three batches, and by the following Spring (1954) it was able to operate all its Bangor line services with railcars. One of the changes made from the prototype was in the power unit; the new batch, instead of A.E.C., were fitted with Leyland-Walker under-floor engines of 125 hp. Passenger numbers increased and by 1956 with capacity found wanting, an additional trailer car was included in each set, the engine capacity being uprated to 165 hp to cope.

The UTA numbering sequence continued from earlier building, the powered cars being numbered from 8 to 35 inclusive (28 units). They were withdrawn from service between 1973 and 1978

The initial batch of trailers was 201 to 214 (renumbered to 501 to 514 in 1958). The additional 1956 trailers originally retained their steam stock numbers before becoming 516 to 527 in 1958. 515 was originally 215, being built in 1953 for Ganz railcar 5, becoming 515 in 1958 and being converted to MED operation in 1963.

In a works visit in mid-1962, intermediate cars 526 and 527 were fitted so that they could run with either Multi-engined (MED) or Multi-purpose (MPD) railcar trains and were not just restricted to their own type. After withdrawal they were sent to Mageramorne to be scrapped, but as the scrapping commenced it was discovered that they contained blue asbestos, and were then sent to Antrim and Ballymena until 1980. From 1980 onward they were dumped in Crosshill Quarry in Crumlin along with dozens of other railcars.

== Livery ==
Under the UTA, from 1951, a Brunswick Green livery was applied to passenger carrying stock and the MED's were outshopped as new in this colour, which lasted until the early 1960s. This was followed by a "regionalised colour scheme" for the system, the livery reflecting the operating area of the MED's. Trains operating on the Bangor line were painted in an "Olive Green" colour, considerably lighter that used for the steam locomotives of the former BCDR; those on the former NCC lines had lower panels in "LMS red", with the upper panels officially described as white, but in fact a very pale shade of grey. The trains operating on the former GNR section were painted with blue lower panels, somewhat lighter than that used by the GNR, and cream; with silver-grey roofs. In both these latter cases the banded colours were extended around the ends.
