= Malone College =

Malone College may refer to:

- Malone College, Belfast, Northern Ireland
- Malone University, formerly Malone College, in Canton, Ohio, US
