= Belfast Great Victoria Street railway station =

Former railway station in central Belfast, Northern Ireland

Great Victoria Street
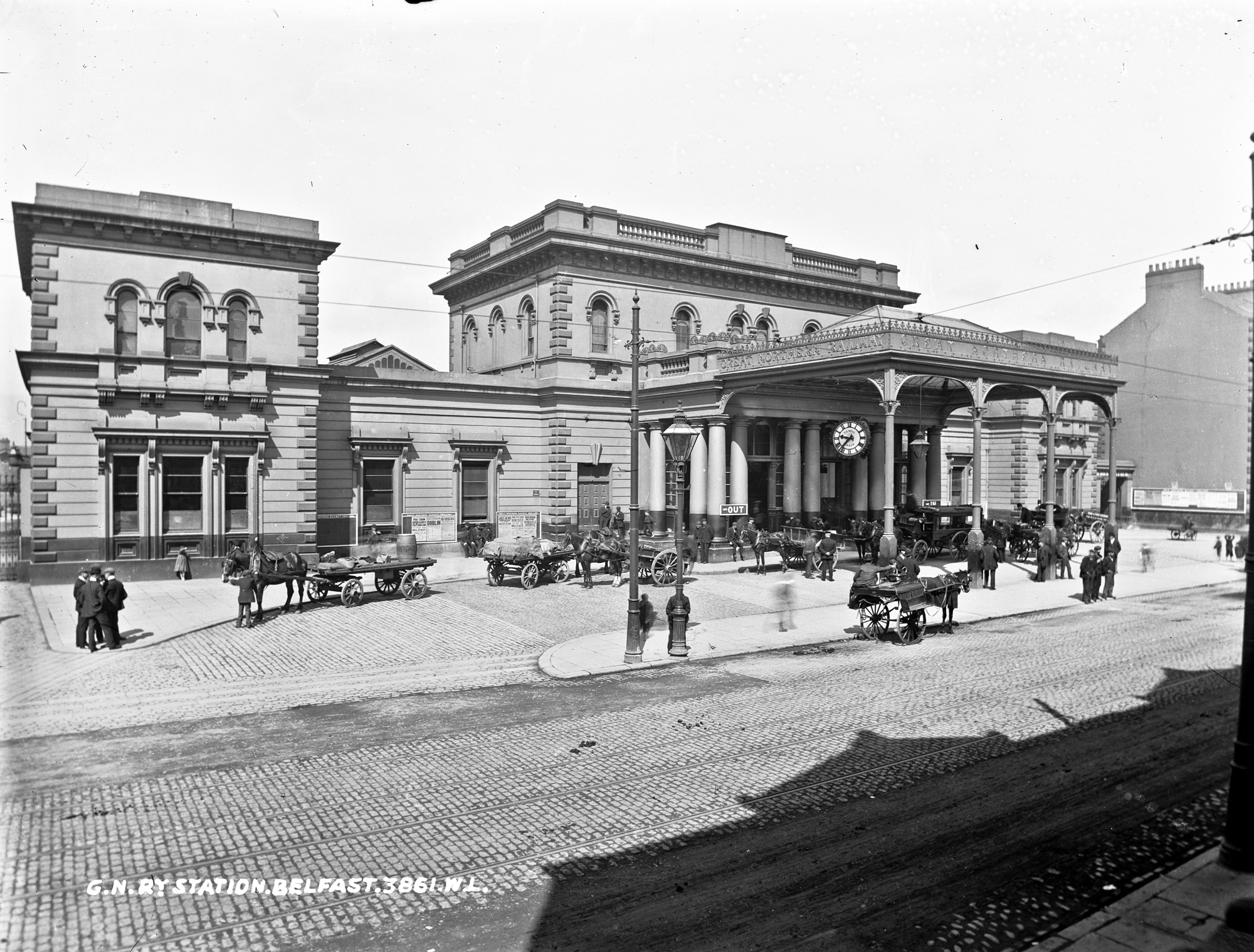

General information
- Location: 10 Glengall St, Belfast, County Antrim, BT12 5AH; Northern Ireland
- Coordinates: 54.5942°N 5.9362°W
- Owner: Translink (Northern Ireland)
- Operator: NI Railways, Ulsterbus
- Lines: Belfast-Newry line (1); Belfast-Bangor line (1); Belfast-Larne line (2); Belfast-Derry line (3)
- Platforms: 4
- Tracks: 4
- Train operators: NI Railways
- Bus stands: 18
- Bus operators: Ulsterbus, Metro, Goldline

Construction
- Structure type: At-grade, platforms demolished
- Parking: Great Northern Car Park (To the right of the station); 535 spaces 9 Handicap Spaces
- Accessible: Yes

Other information
- Station code: GV
- Fare zone: 1

History
- Former names: Belfast (1839-1852); Belfast Victoria Street (1852-1856)
- Original company: Ulster Railway
- Post-grouping: Great Northern Railway (Ireland)

Key dates
- 12 August 1839: First station opened
- 13 November 1848: First terminus completed
- November 1968: Terminus largely demolished
- 24 April 1976: First station closed
- 30 September 1995: Second station opened
- 10 May 2024: Second station closed, to be replaced by Grand Central station
- 7 September 2024: Europa Buscentre closed, replaced by Grand Central station
- 13 October 2024: Grand Central opens with the first service departing at 8.05 to Dublin

Passengers
- 2015/16: 4.380 million
- 2016/17: ▲4.716 million
- 2017/18: ▲5.031 million
- 2018/19: ▲5.348 million
- 2019/20: ▼5.077 million
- 2020/21: ▼811,049
- 2021/22: ▲2.462 million
- 2022/23: ▲3.939 million
- 2023/24: ▲4.900 million
- 2024/25: ▼567,811 (Closed May 2024)
- NI Railways; Translink; NI railway stations
Location
- Location within Northern Ireland

Great Victoria Street was a railway station that served the city centre of Belfast, Northern Ireland. It was one of two main stations in the city, along with Lanyon Place, and was nearest to the city centre. The station was situated beside Great Victoria Street and shared a site with the Europa Buscentre, Belfast's former main bus station. The railway and bus stations were replaced by the adjacent Belfast Grand Central station with the official opening on 13 October 2024. Great Victoria Street railway station closed permanently on 10 May 2024, with a bus transfer service operating until rail services commenced from Belfast Grand Central, with a service to Dublin at 8:05 a.m. on 13 October 2024. Europa Buscentre closed permanently on 7 September 2024, with bus services immediately transferring to the new station, commencing with a service to Dublin at 5 a.m. on 8 September 2024.

Great Victoria Street was the busiest railway station in Northern Ireland at closure, with a peak of 5,347,662 passengers passing through the station in 2018–2019.

== History ==
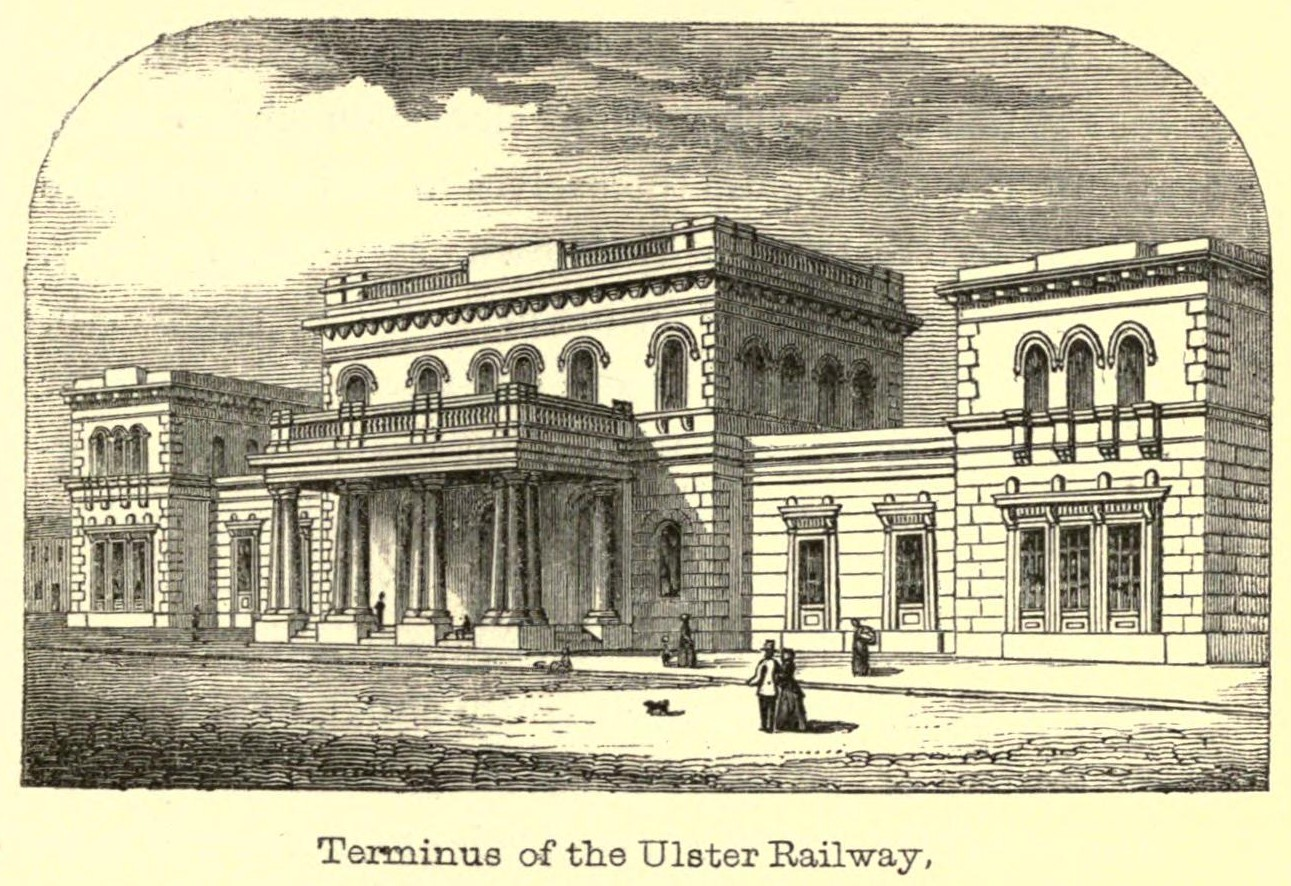
The 1848 Godwin-designed terminus building, as drawn in 1854.

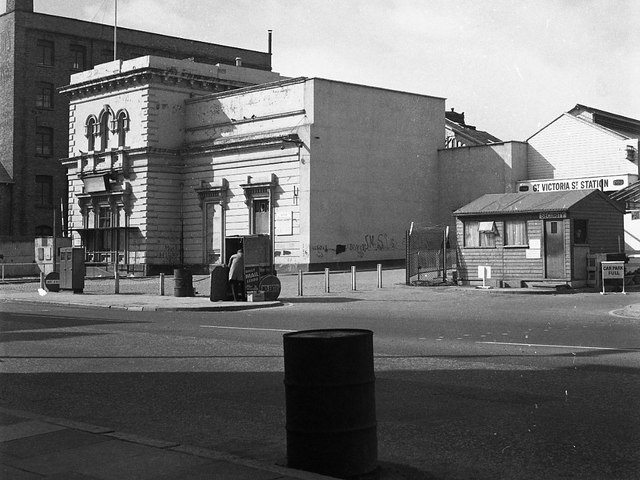
Remains of the station building in 1976, before final demolition.

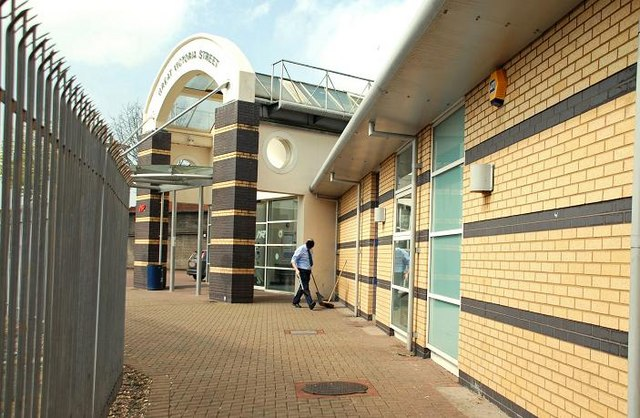
Entrance to station in 2009.

The station was on the site of a former linen mill, beside where Durham Street crossed the Blackstaff River at the Saltwater (now Boyne) Bridge.

The Ulster Railway opened the first station on 12 August 1839. A new terminal building, probably designed by Ulster Railway engineer John Godwin, was completed in 1848. Godwin later founded the School of Civil Engineering at Queen's College.

The station, built directly on Victoria Street, was Belfast's first railway terminus, and as such was called just "Belfast" until 1852. By this time, two other railway companies had opened termini in Belfast, so the Ulster Railway renamed its terminus "Belfast Victoria Street" for clarity. In 1855 the Dublin and Belfast Junction Railway was completed, making Victoria Street the terminus for one of the most important main lines in Ireland. The Ulster Railway changed the station name again to "Great Victoria Street" in 1856, in line with a change of the street name.

In 1876 the Ulster Railway became part of the Great Northern Railway (GNR), making Great Victoria Street the terminus for a network that extended south to Dublin and west to Derry and Bundoran.

Express passenger traffic to and from Dublin Connolly station was always Great Victoria Street's most prestigious traffic. The GNR upgraded its expresses over the decades and in 1947 introduced the Enterprise non-stop service between the two capitals. As Belfast suburbs grew, commuter traffic also grew in volume.

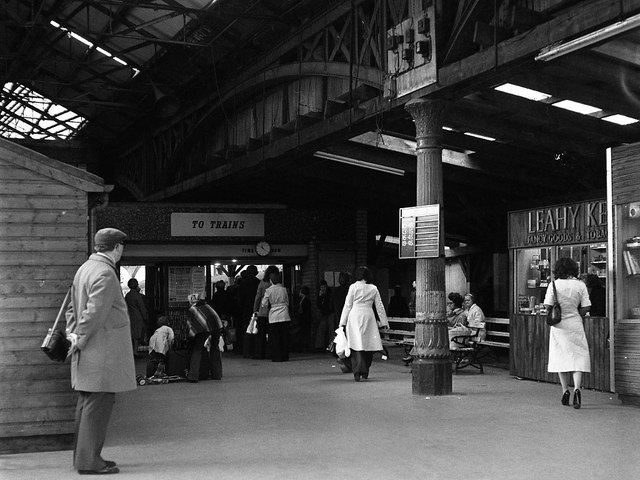
Interior of the original station in 1976.

In 1958, the Ulster Transport Authority took over Northern Ireland's bus and rail services. Three years later Great Victoria Street station was modernised, and a bus centre incorporated into the facility. Then in 1968, a large section of the 1848 terminal building was demolished to make way for the development of the Europa Hotel, which opened in 1971.

During the conflict known as The Troubles, the station was attacked several times. On 22 March 1972, 70 people were injured, a train was destroyed and the station significantly damaged by a car bomb. Another bomb explosion, on 21 July, destroyed four buses but caused no casualties. This was one of 20 bombs that exploded that day, planted by the Provisional Irish Republican Army in an event that became known as Bloody Friday

In April 1976 Northern Ireland Railways closed both Great Victoria Street and the Belfast Queen's Quay terminus of the Bangor line and replaced them both with a new Belfast Central Station, now renamed Lanyon Place. The remainder of Great Victoria Street station was demolished. After a feasibility study was commissioned in 1986 it was agreed that a new development on the site, incorporating the reintroduction of the Great Northern Railway, was viable. The Great Northern Tower had already been built on the site of the old station terminus in 1992, and so the second Great Victoria Street Station was built behind the tower block, yards from the site of its predecessor. The new station was opened on 30 September 1995. The station closed on Friday 10 May 2024 to make way for the new Belfast Grand Central station. The last train to depart was the 23:32 service to Bangor.

== Railway station ==
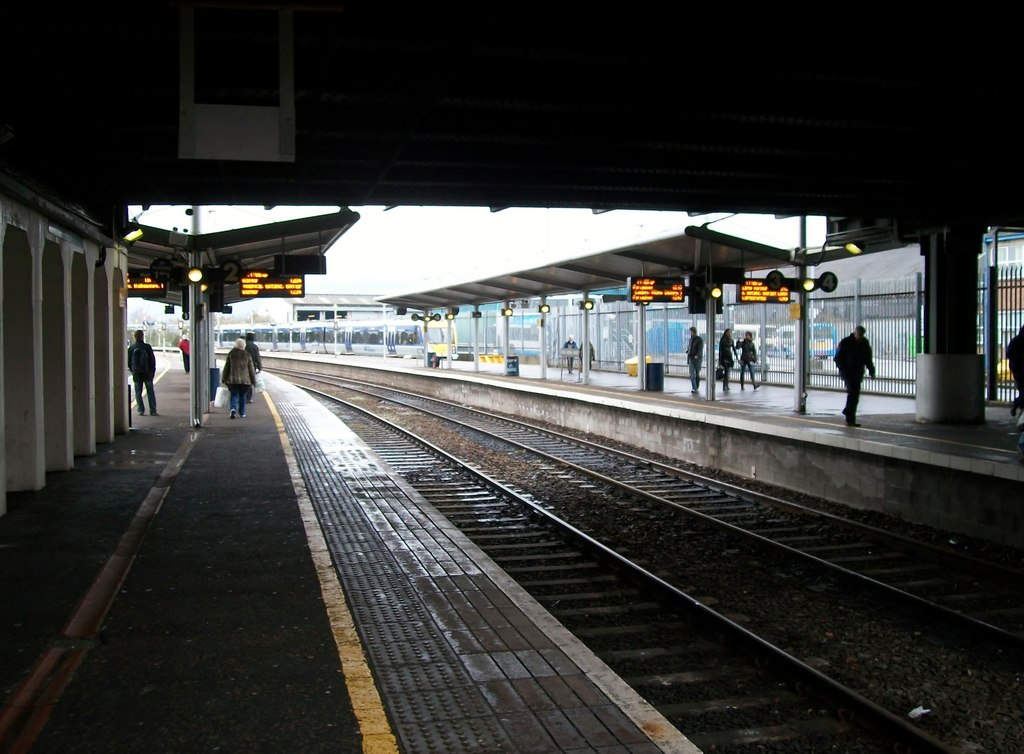
Great Victoria Street platforms in 2011.

The final station had two island platforms providing a total of four platform faces. Platforms 2 and 3 ran the full length of the site and opened onto the station's main concourse. Platforms 1 and 4 were half the length and were accessible by walking down the other platforms.

Great Victoria Street was the hub of Northern Ireland's suburban rail services, with Bangor line, Derry~Londonderry line, Newry line and Larne Line trains all terminating there.

=== Service at closure ===
On Mondays to Saturdays, there were half-hourly services to Bangor or Portadown on the Bangor and Portadown Lines, with some Portadown-bound trains continuing on to Newry.

There was also a half-hourly service on the Larne Line, with the terminus alternating between Whitehead and Larne Harbour being the terminus every half hour.

Derry~Londonderry Line trains operated hourly from Great Victoria Street to Derry~Londonderry with connecting shuttle service from Coleraine to Portrush via the Coleraine-Portrush railway line.

On Sundays, the Bangor, Larne, and Portadown Line services all reduced to hourly operation. Derry~Londonderry Line services reduced to two-hourly operation, with only seven trains running each way. Derry~Londonderry Line trains were still hourly but alternated between Derry Waterside and Portrush, except for the final train of the evening, which terminated at Coleraine.

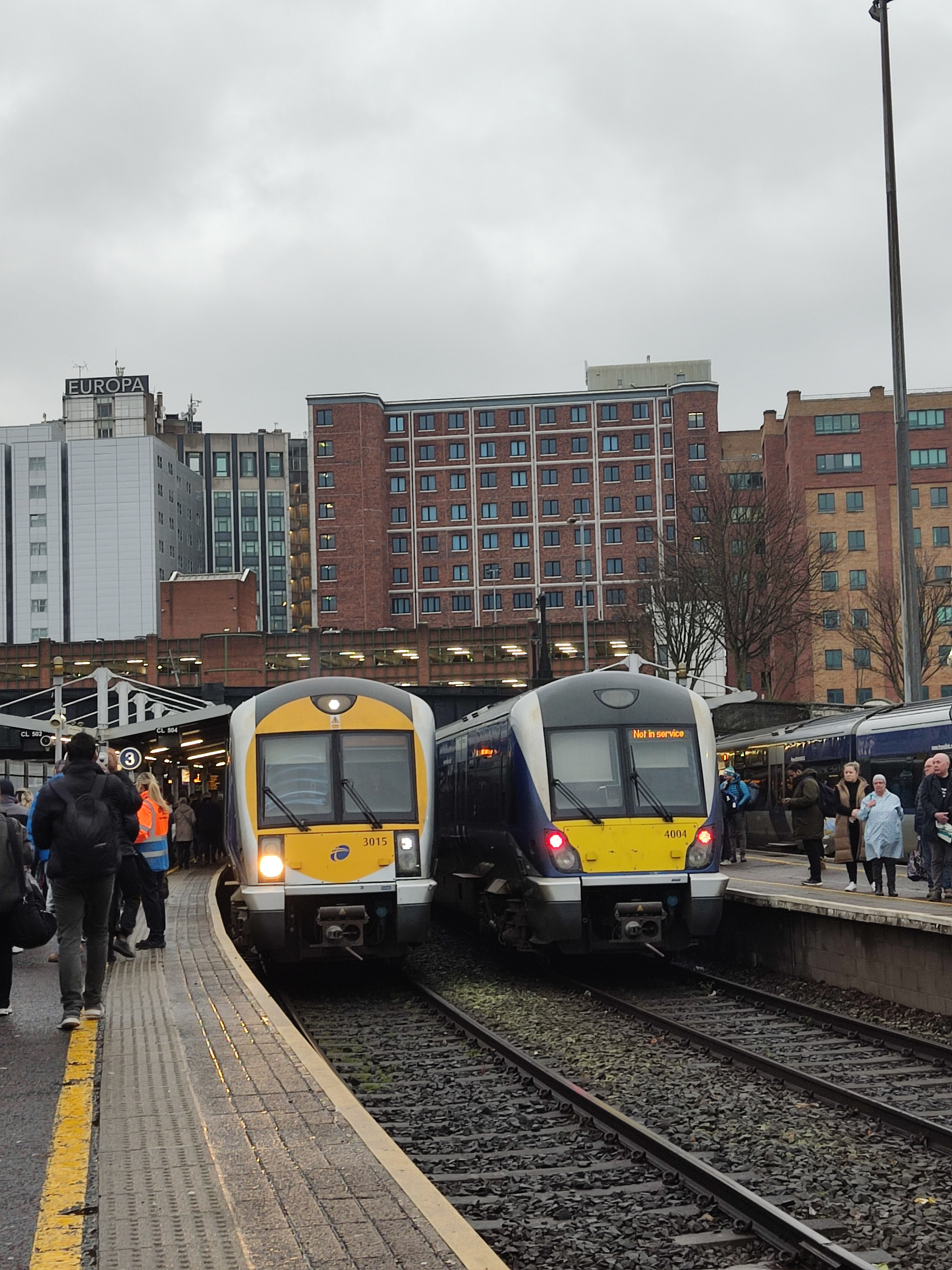
Class 3000 (left) and class 4000 (right)

Preceding station	NI Railways	Following station
Terminus	Northern Ireland Railways; Belfast-Derry	City Hospital
Terminus	Northern Ireland Railways; Belfast-Larne	City Hospital
Terminus	Northern Ireland Railways; Belfast-Bangor	City Hospital
Adelaide	Northern Ireland Railways; Belfast-Newry	City Hospital
	Proposed	
Terminus	Enterprise; Belfast-Dublin	Portadown
	Historical railways	
Terminus	Ulster Railway; Belfast-Portadown	Balmoral; Line and station open
Terminus	Great Northern Railway (Ireland)	Adelaide and Windsor; Line and station open
Terminus	Great Northern Railway (Ireland); Enterprise Express	Amiens Street; Line and station open

=== Air Link ===
Railway access from Great Victoria Street at Sydenham linked into George Best Belfast City Airport on the line to Bangor.

=== 21st century ===
NI Railways constructed a new traincare facility next to Adelaide station for its diesel multiple units. The opportunity was also taken to improve the infrastructure at Great Victoria Street; the plan to begin with was to reduce the curves by realigning the track, and moving the buffer stops and the route from the platforms to the concourse to the other side of Durham Street. Additionally there were plans to add a fifth platform to the station, which would have culminated in Enterprise services transferring from Lanyon Place to Great Victoria Street. However, under Translink's subsequent plan to build a new integrated transport hub, the proposal has expanded to the potential construction of a brand new 6–8 platform station on the site of the old Grosvenor Road freight depot, close to the existing station, because the existing site is too constrained for any further expansion. It was announced that the station would close permanently on 10 May 2024, though the line from Belfast to Lisburn would remain open using the third side of the triangular track layout to bypass the GVS/GC site, as services used to do during the station's first closure from 1976-1995.

Great Victoria Street station closed permanently on 10 May 2024.

== Rail and sea connections ==
=== Port of Belfast ===
The Port of Belfast has a Stena Line ferry connecting to Cairnryan for the bus link to Stranraer and onward trains along the Glasgow South Western Line to Glasgow Central.

Preceding station	Ferry	Following station
Stranraer Harbour (via bus link from Cairnryan)	Stena Line; Ferry	Port of Belfast (from Yorkgate, Lanyon Place or Belfast Great Victoria Street)
Liverpool	Stena Line; Ferry	Port of Belfast (from Yorkgate, Lanyon Place or Belfast Great Victoria Street)
Douglas	Isle of Man Steam Packet; Ferry(seasonal)	Port of Belfast (from Yorkgate, Lanyon Place or Belfast Great Victoria Street)
Stranraer Harbour (via bus link from Cairnryan)	P&O Ferries; Ferry	Larne Harbour

=== Port of Larne ===
The Larne line connects with Larne Harbour with P&O Ferries sailing to Cairnryan for the bus link to Stranraer and onward trains along the Glasgow South Western Line to Glasgow Central, as well as alternative sailings by P&O Ferries to Troon also on the Glasgow South Western Line to Glasgow Central.

== Europa Buscentre ==
Great Victoria Street was part of a major public transport interchange, being adjacent to the Europa Buscentre. This was built in 1991 as the ground floor level of a multi-storey car park. The Buscentre is the Belfast terminus for most Ulsterbus "Goldline" services in Northern Ireland. These serve various destinations that are not on the railway network, including Enniskillen, Banbridge, Omagh, Downpatrick, Cavan, Newcastle, Strabane and Armagh. Also, services from the Buscentre serve both Belfast City Airport and Belfast International Airport directly. Ulsterbus runs joint services with Bus Éireann for its direct express service to Dublin and Dublin Airport, with National Express to Dumfries, Carlisle, Manchester, Birmingham, Milton Keynes and London, and with Citylink to Glasgow and Edinburgh.

Europa Buscentre closed permanently on 7 September 2024, with bus services immediately transferring to Belfast Grand Central Station, commencing with a service to Belfast International Airport and Dublin at 5 a.m on 8 September 2024.

Preceding station	Ulsterbus	Following station
Newry Buscentre	Goldline; Belfast-Dublin (Route X1)	Terminus
Newry Buscentre	Bus Éireann; Dublin-Belfast (Route X1)	Terminus
Dublin Airport	Goldline; Belfast-Dublin (Route X2)	Terminus
Dublin Airport	Bus Éireann; Dublin-Belfast (Route X2)	Terminus
Toomebridge By-Pass	Goldline; Belfast-Derry (Route 212)	Terminus
Adelaide Street	Goldline; Belfast-Downpatrick (Route 215); Belfast-Newcastle (Route 237)	Terminus
Ballynahinch	Goldline; Belfast-Newcastle (Route 237A)	Terminus
Belfast High Street	Goldline; Belfast-Ballymena-Coleraine (Route 218); Belfast-Ballymena-Coleraine (Route 219)	Terminus
Ballymena Railway Station	Goldline; Belfast-Giant's Causeway (Route 221)	Terminus
Portadown Market Street	Goldline; Belfast-Armagh/Monaghan (Route 251)	Terminus
Dungannon Bus Station	Goldline; Belfast-Enniskillen (Route 261)	Terminus
Dungannon Bus Station	Goldline; Belfast-Derry via Omagh (Route 273)	Terminus
Belfast International Airport	Airport Express; Airport Express (Route 300)	Terminus
Belfast City Airport	Airport Express; Airport Express (Route 600)	Terminus
Stranraer Ferry Terminal via Stena Line	Eurolines; Belfast-London	Terminus
Stranraer Ferry Terminal via Stena Line	Eurolines; Belfast-Edinburgh	Terminus

== Gallery ==
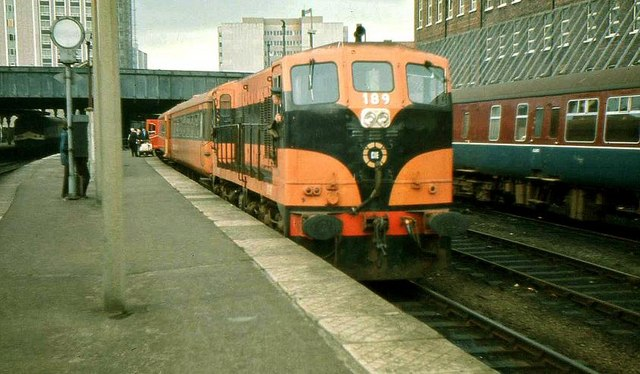
View in 1975 with the Enterprise to Dublin Connolly.

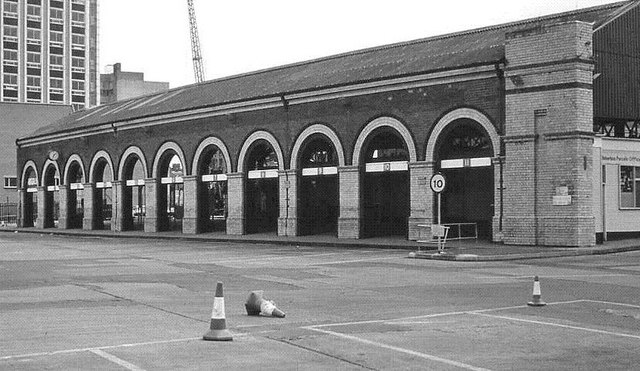
View of the former GNR railway station when used by Ulsterbus in 1988.

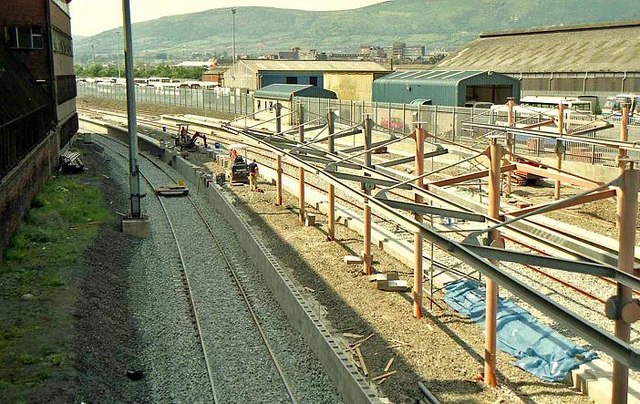
The closed station being rebuilt in 1995 for NIR services bar the Enterprise.

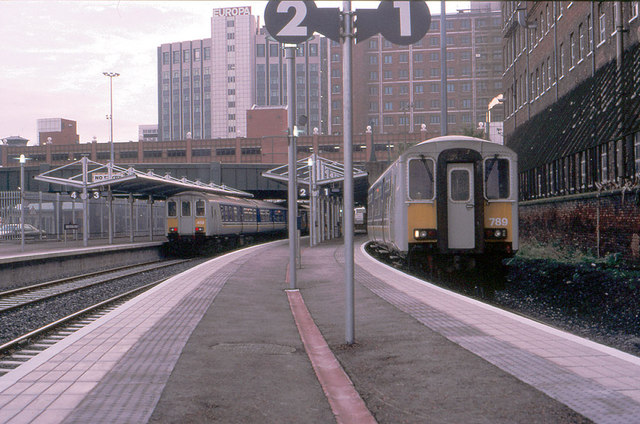
View of platforms in 1995.

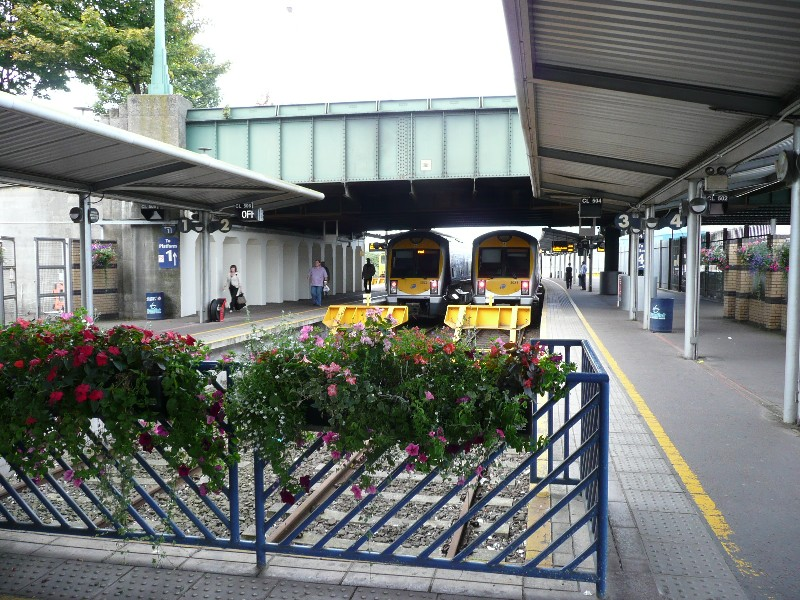
Platforms 2 and 3 at Great Victoria Street in August 2007.

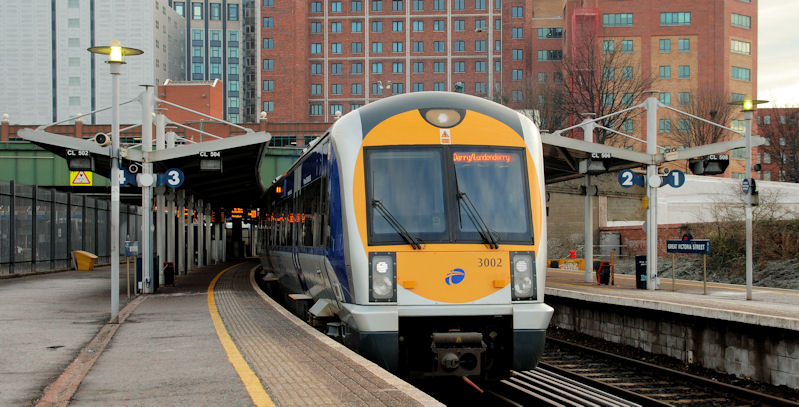
NIR service in 2011 on the Derry~Londonderry railway line.

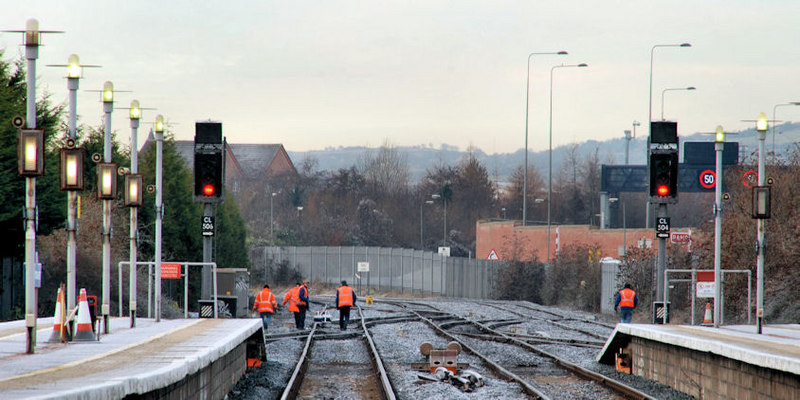
The permanent way down the platforms in 2011.
