= Adelaide railway station (Northern Ireland) =

Railway station in Belfast, Northern Ireland

Adelaide
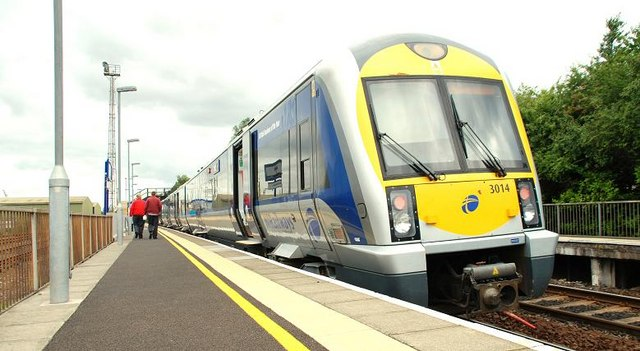
- NIR Class 3000 train at Adelaide in July 2009

General information
- Other names: Adelaide Halt
- Location: Adelaide Avenue, Belfast, BT9 7FY; Belfast; Northern Ireland
- Coordinates: 54.57838°N 5.95480°W
- Grid position: J 322 719
- System: Translink rail halt
- Owner: NI Railways
- Operator: NI Railways
- Line: Dublin–Belfast
- Distance: Dublin Connolly: 111 miles 13 chains (178.9 km); Belfast Lanyon Place: 2 miles 23 chains (3.7 km)
- Platforms: 2
- Tracks: 2

Construction
- Structure type: At-grade
- Parking: No
- Cycle facilities: No
- Accessible: Partial: ramp from Lisburn Road to the countrybound platform; the citybound platform and Boucher Road access require the footbridge and steps

Other information
- Station code: AD
- Fare zone: iLink Zone 1
- Website: translink.co.uk/adelaide

History
- Rebuilt: 2008; 2023–2024 platform works
- Original company: Great Northern Railway (Ireland)
- Pre-grouping: Great Northern Railway (Ireland)
- Post-grouping: Great Northern Railway (Ireland)

Key dates
- 1 November 1897: Opened as Adelaide and Windsor
- 1935: Renamed Adelaide
- 2008: Refurbished
- 2023–2024: Platform-extension and footbridge-refurbishment works

Passengers
- 2022/23: 275,408
- 2023/24: ▲279,518
- 2024/25: ▼198,691
- 2025/26: ▲283,566

Services
Preceding station	NI Railways	Following station
Balmoral towards Lisburn, Portadown or Newry	Portadown Line	Belfast Grand Central Terminus

Historical railways
Preceding station	NI Railways	Following station
Balmoral	Portadown Line	Great Victoria Street; Nov 1897 - Apr 1976; Sep 1995 - May 2024
Balmoral	Portadown Line	Botanic; Apr 1976 - Oct 1986
Balmoral	Portadown Line	City Hospital; Oct 1986 - Sep 1995; May 2024 - Jul 2024
Preceding station	Great Northern Railway (Ireland)	Following station
Balmoral	Great Northern Railway (Ireland); Great Northern Main Line	Great Victoria Street
- NI Railways; Translink; NI railway stations
Route map
(Click to expand)
Location
- Location within Northern Ireland Location within island of Ireland

Adelaide railway station (also known as Adelaide Halt) is located in the townland of Malone Lower in south Belfast, County Antrim, Northern Ireland. Situated just off the Lisburn Road and close to many Queen's University student residences, it serves both local commuters and fans heading to Windsor Park stadium the home of the Northern Ireland national football team.

== History ==
The station was opened by the Great Northern Railway (Ireland) on 1 November 1897 and was originally known as Adelaide and Windsor. In 1935 the name was shortened to Adelaide. The station became an unstaffed halt in October 1996, and underwent a refurbishment in 2008 to modernise passenger facilities and improve infrastructure.

== Location and facilities ==
In addition to serving the local community of Windsor and Queen's University students, Adelaide Station is a key access point for events held at the nearby Windsor Park stadium. The station is connected to the stadium by a dedicated pedestrian link, ensuring convenient access for visitors.

=== Maintenance depot ===
Adjacent to the station are extensive yard facilities which, once busy with freight trains carrying cement, containers, beer, and fertiliser, have since been repurposed. With freight services north of the border ending in the late 1990s and the withdrawal of the 80 Class units in 2005, the yard now functions as a depot for NI Railways’ modern Class 3000 and 4000 DMU trains.

== Upgrades ==
=== Platform extension (2024) ===
Originally, the platforms at Adelaide station were designed to accommodate only three-car sets. The upgrade extended each platform to approximately 150 meters, enabling the new six-car, walk-through trains to call at the station. This development has significantly increased passenger capacity while also improving overall accessibility and safety with the installation of upgraded lighting, shelters, and enhanced public realm features. The project was delivered in conjunction with partners such as Charles Brand and Gravis Planning during the Belfast Grand Central enabling works.

=== Proposed third track ===
Translink's long-term development plan includes the potential addition of a third track running from the Adelaide depot to Grand Central Station, aimed at increasing capacity. Currently, the track bed alignment is fenced off within the railway boundaries to prevent development and is managed as part of the lineside infrastructure.

== Services ==
=== Train Services ===
Mondays to Saturdays there is a half-hourly service towards Lisburn, Portadown or Newry in one direction and to Belfast Grand Central in the other. Extra trains operate at peak times, and the service reduces to hourly operation in the evenings. On Sundays there is an hourly service in each direction. Passengers for Enterprise Services, Bangor, Larne or Derry~Londonderry lines must change at Belfast Grand Central for their connecting services.

=== Bus Services ===
Adelaide is situated near the Metro 9 bus route along Lisburn Road, providing access to Belfast City Centre (Bedford Street) and Balmoral. Additionally, Regional Ulsterbus services connect Adelaide to Belfast Grand Central Station, as well as Lisburn, Banbridge, Newry, Portadown, and Armagh. Railway replacement buses also operate from these bus stands.

== Gallery ==
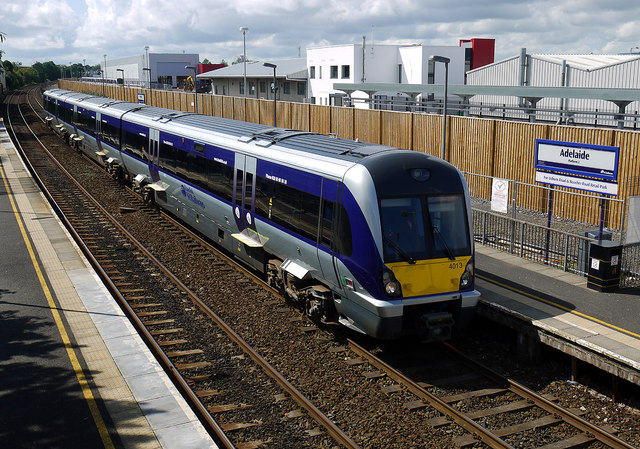
Bangor bound train in 2012

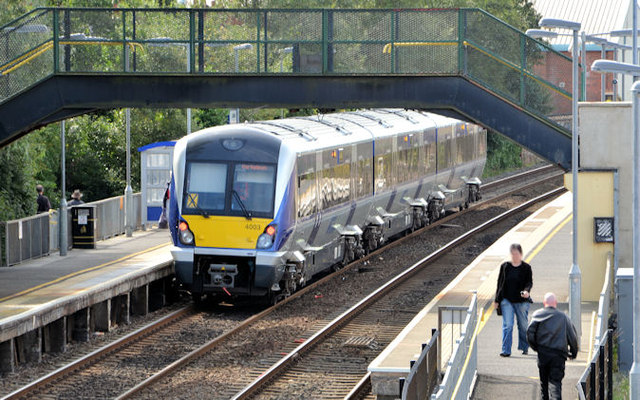
Portadown bound class 4000 in 2013

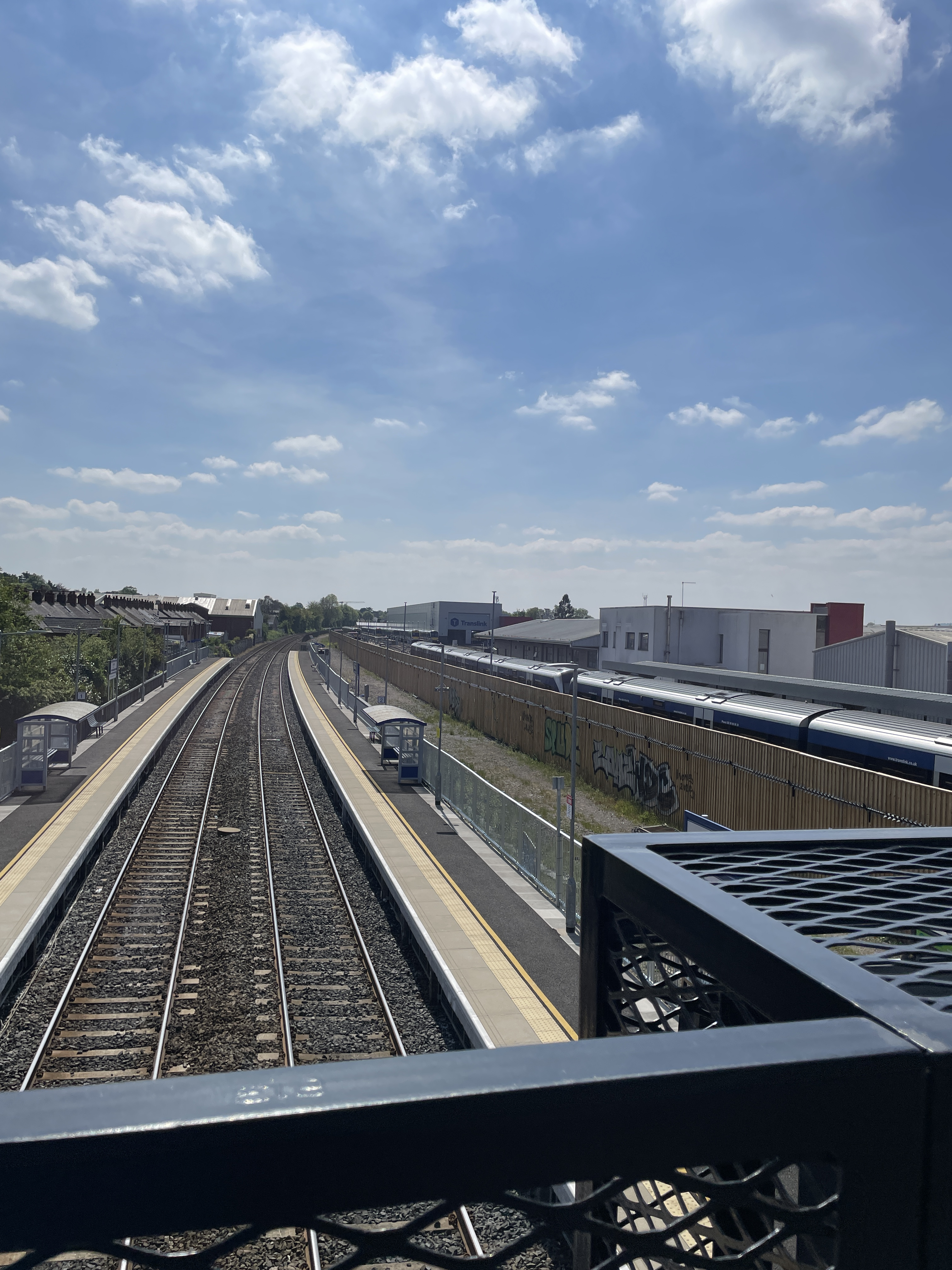
View from bridge

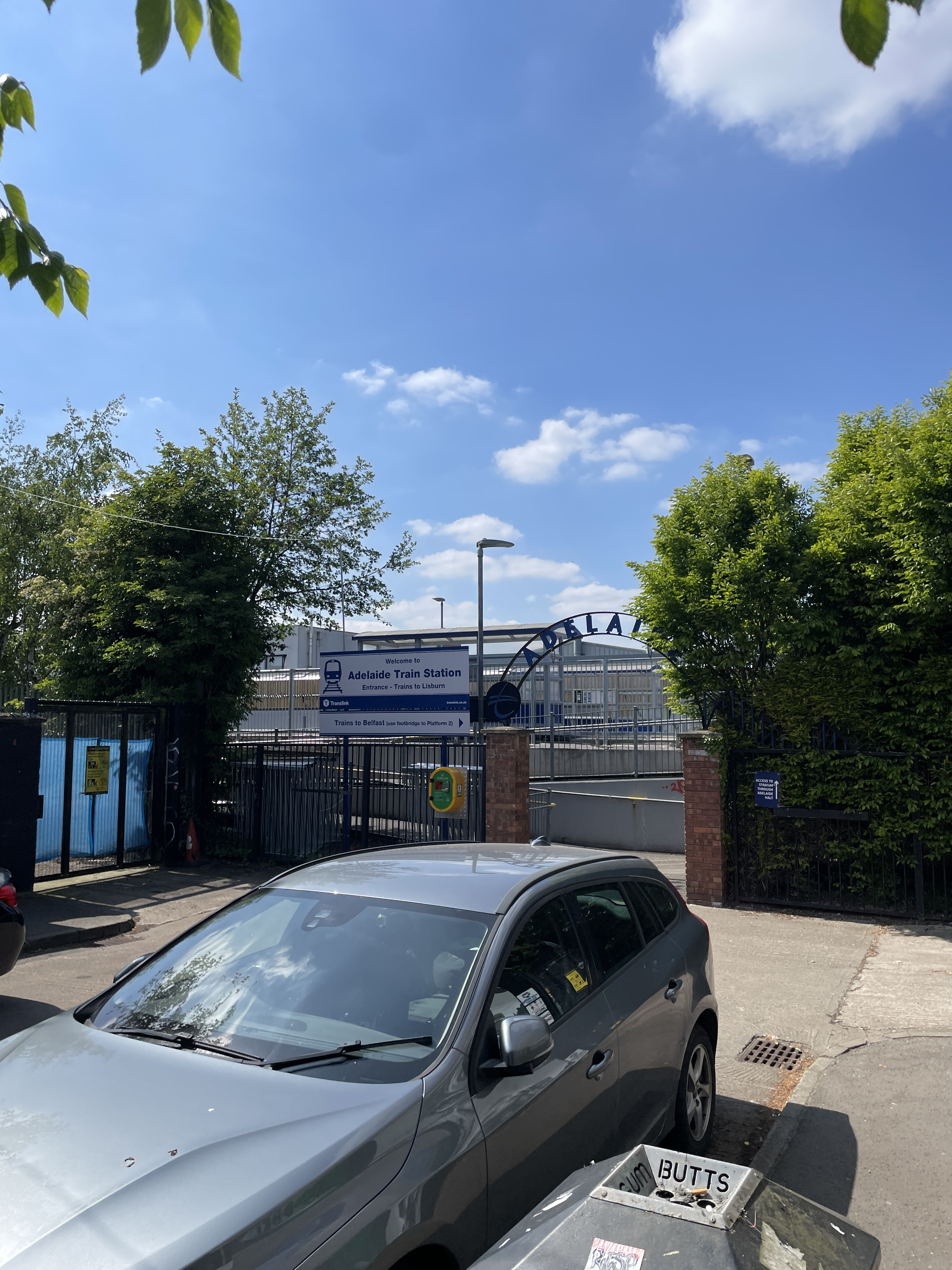
The Entrance to Adelaide train station from the Lisburn Road
