= Botanic railway station =

Railway station in Belfast

Botanic
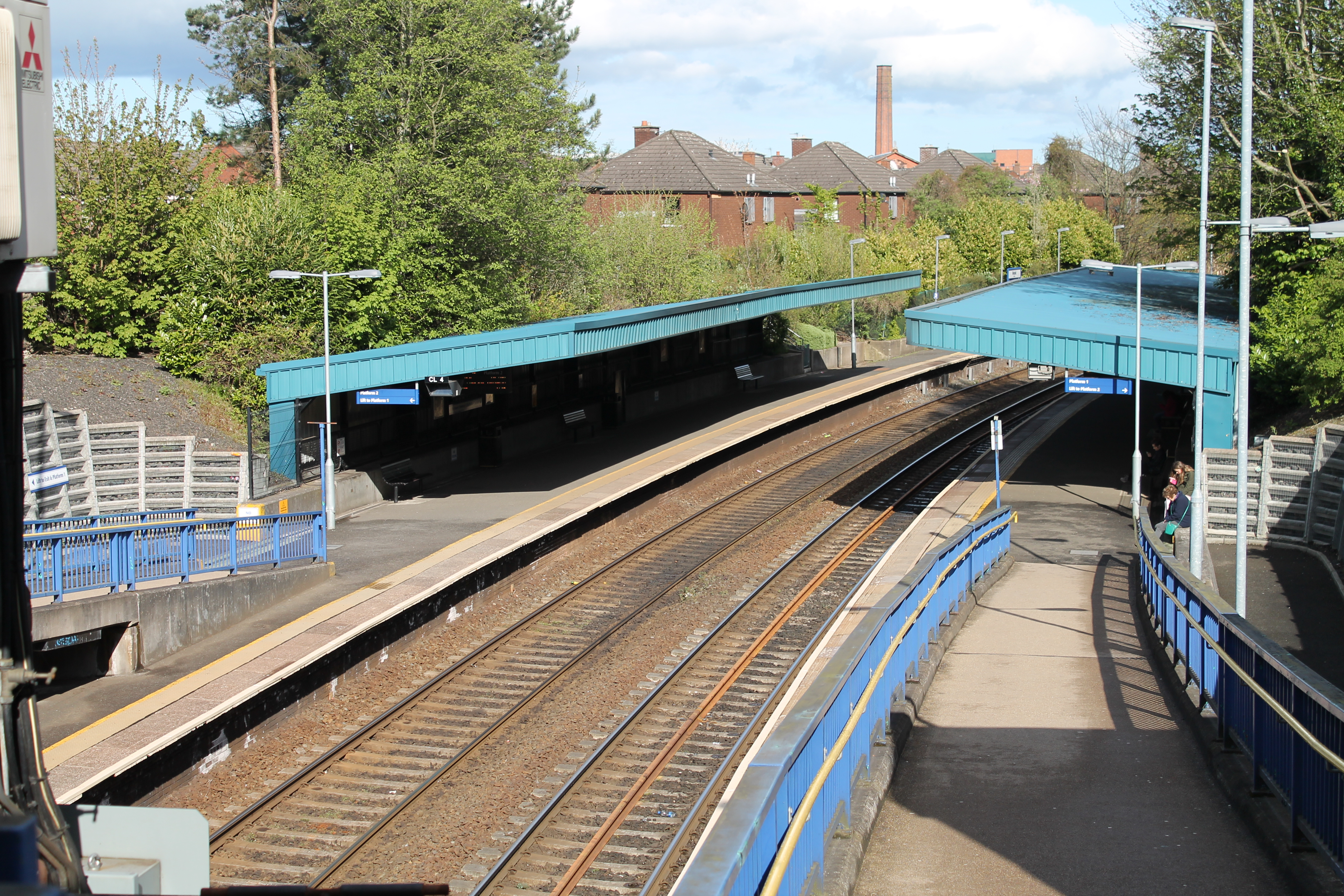

General information
- Location: Belfast; Northern Ireland
- Coordinates: 54.5884°N 5.9328°W
- System: Translink commuter rail station
- Owner: NI Railways
- Operator: NI Railways
- Lines: Bangor Line; Derry Line; Larne Line
- Platforms: 2
- Tracks: 2

Construction
- Structure type: At-grade
- Parking: no
- Accessible: yes

Other information
- Station code: BT
- Fare zone: iLink Zone 1

Key dates
- 1976: Opened
- 2008: Refurbished

Passengers
- 2015/16: 986,782
- 2016/17: ▲1,059,520
- 2017/18: ▲1,149,721
- 2018/19: ▲1,261,872
- 2019/20: ▼1,199,695
- 2020/21: ▼178,872
- 2021/22: ▲686,153
- 2022/23: ▲904,204
- 2023/24: ▲1.176 million
- 2024/25: ▼1.065 million
- 2025/26: ▲1.214 million

Services
Preceding station	NI Railways	Following station
Lanyon Place towards Bangor	Bangor Line	City Hospital towards Belfast Grand Central
Lanyon Place towards Carrickfergus, Whitehead, Larne Town or Larne Harbour	Larne Line	City Hospital towards Belfast Grand Central
Lanyon Place towards Coleraine, Portrush or Derry~Londonderry	Derry Line	City Hospital towards Belfast Grand Central

Historical railways
Preceding station	Historical railways	Following station
Belfast Central; Line and station open	NI Railways; Belfast–Bangor / Belfast–Portadown (1976–1986)	Adelaide; Line and station open
Belfast Central; Line and station open	NI Railways; Belfast–Bangor / Belfast–Derry / Belfast–Portadown (1986–1995)	City Hospital; Line and station open
Belfast Central; Line and station open	Enterprise; Belfast–Dublin (Selected Friday services, before 1995)	Lisburn; Line and station open
- NI Railways; Translink; NI railway stations
Route map
(Click to expand)
Location
- Location within Northern Ireland Location within island of Ireland

Botanic railway station serves the Botanic area in south Belfast, Northern Ireland and students for Queen's University Belfast; it is also near Shaftesbury Square which is along Botanic Avenue. It is named after the nearby Belfast Botanic Gardens. It is one of the four stations located in the city centre, the others being City Hospital, Lanyon Place and Grand Central.

The station opened on 26 April 1976 and is very close to City Hospital Station.

Passengers can alight here for the Ulster Museum, which is situated on the edge of Botanic Gardens.

== Services ==
=== Train services ===
On weekdays, there is a half-hourly service on the Bangor Line between Grand Central and Bangor, with extra trains at peak times. The Derry~Londonderry Line operates an hourly service between Grand Central and Derry~Londonderry, with additional trains to Coleraine at peak times. The Larne Line operates a half-hourly service to Larne Harbour and Whitehead, with the terminus alternating between the two every half-hour. Extra trains operate to Carrickfergus and Larne Town at peak times.

On Saturdays, service patterns remain largely similar except without any additional peak-time trains.

On Sundays, the Bangor Line reduces to an hourly service. The Derry~Londonderry Line alternates its outbound terminus every hour between Derry~Londonderry and Portrush, resulting in a two-hourly service to stations beyond Coleraine. The Larne Line also reduces to hourly but continues alternating the terminus between Larne Harbour and Whitehead, resulting in a two-hourly service to stations beyond Whitehead.

The timetable allows 3 minutes for the trains to travel between Lanyon Place and Botanic.

At one point, the cross-border Enterprise service to Dublin Connolly served Botanic, but no longer stops at the station.

=== Bus services ===
Belfast Metro's 7 services connect Botanic station to the City Centre, Four Winds, Laurelgrove, Braniel, and Stormont. Additionally, the 625 Ulsterbus service also stop near the station with runs from the City Centre to Ballynahinch and Carryduff. There are no ticket vending machines (TVMs) for bus tickets; passengers can either download the mLink app or pay directly on the bus.

== Gallery ==
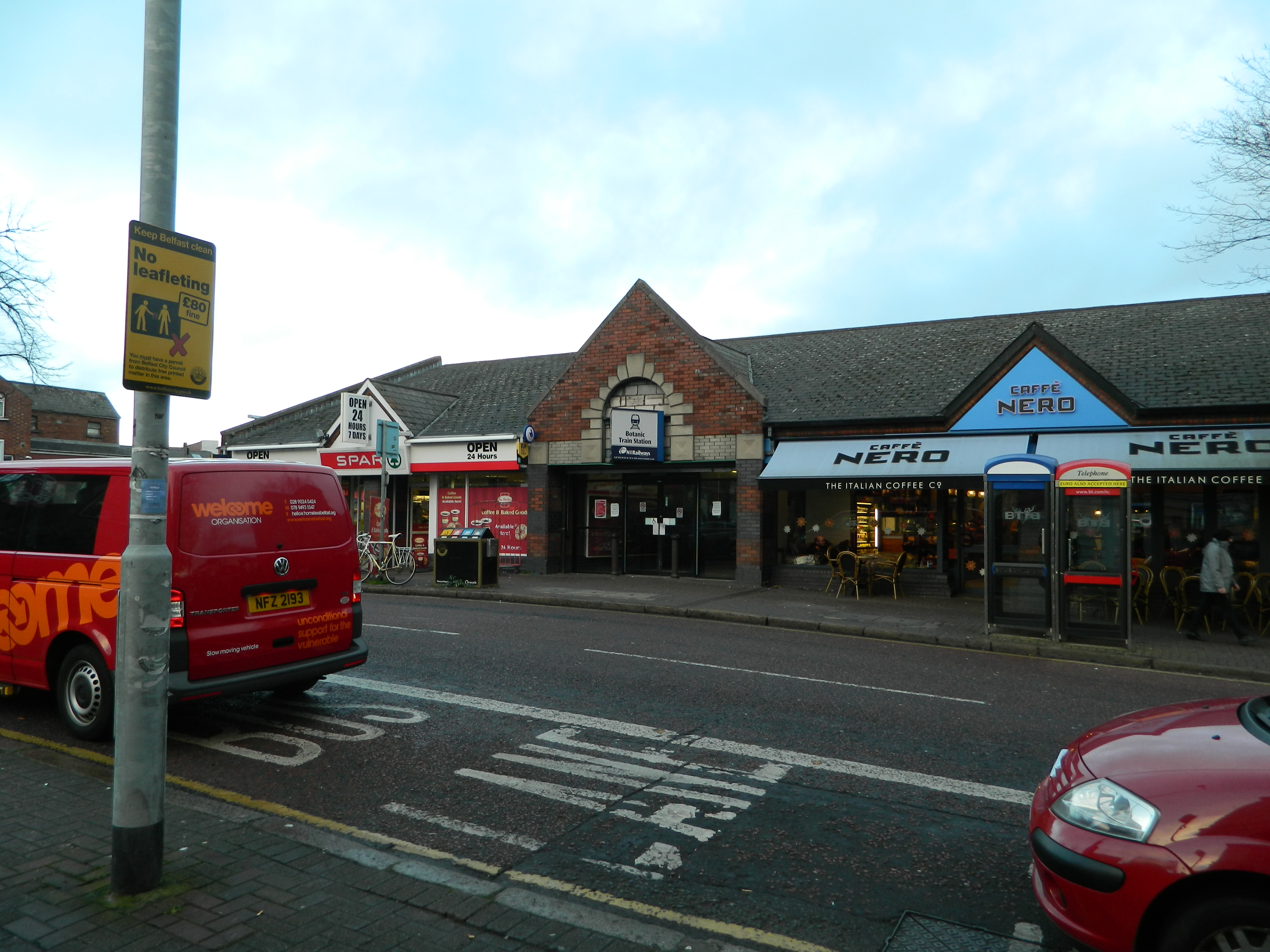
Exterior of the station

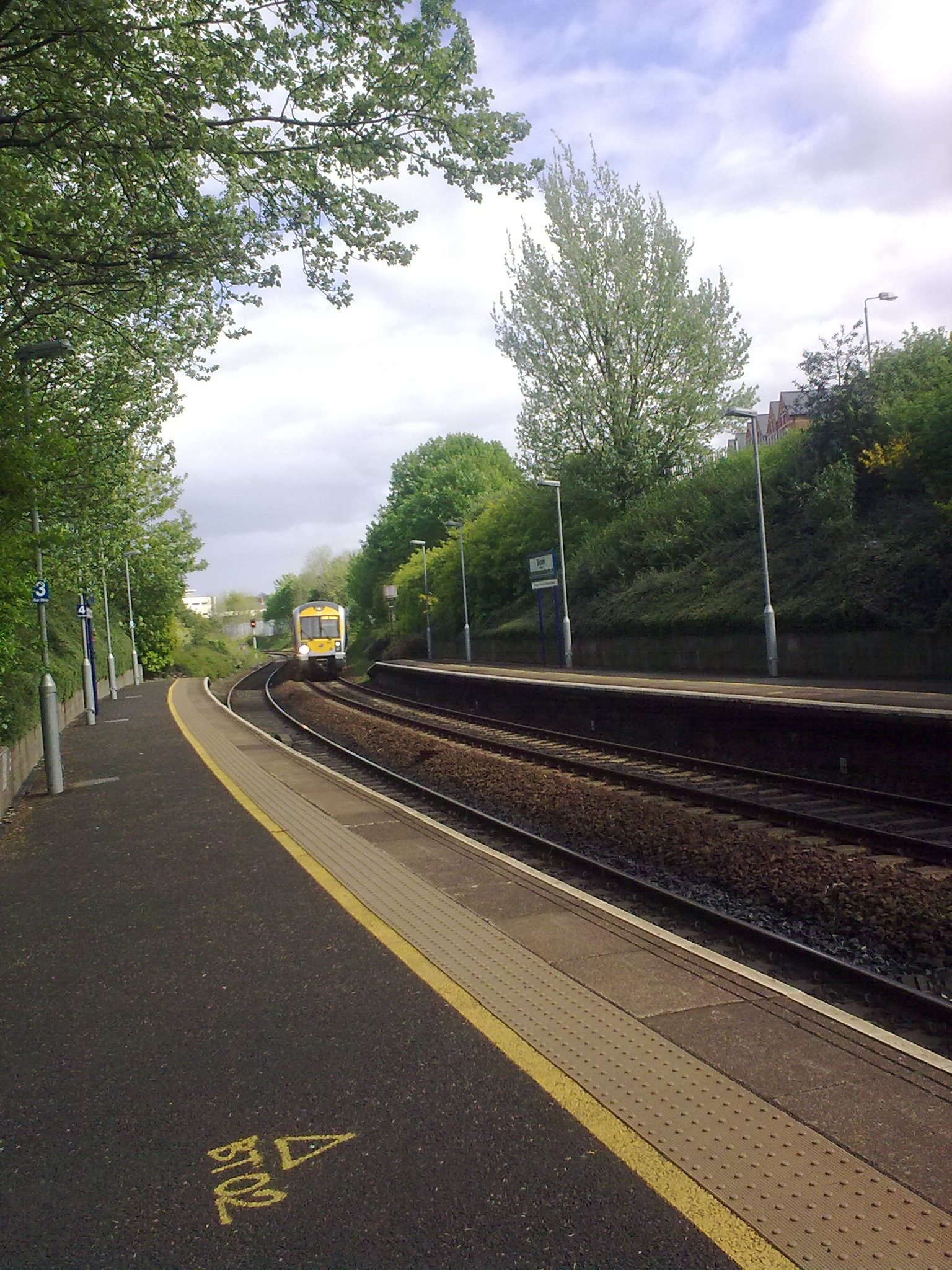
NIR Class 3000 train approaching Botanic in 2009

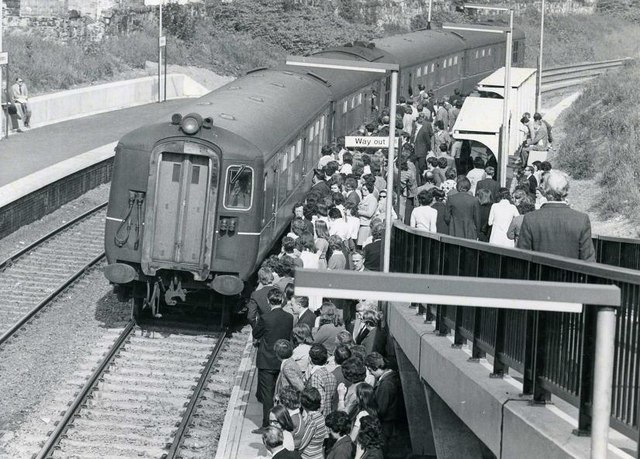
NIR 80 Class DEMU at Botanic station in 1976
