= Finaghy railway station =

Railway station in Northern Ireland

Finaghy
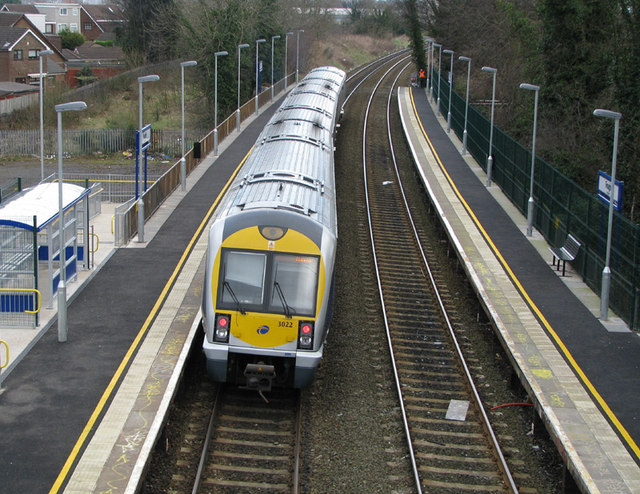

General information
- Location: 33 Finaghy Road North, Finaghy, BT10 0JB; Belfast; Northern Ireland
- Coordinates: 54.5638°N 5.9866°W
- Owner: NI Railways
- Operator: NI Railways
- Line: Dublin–Belfast
- Distance: Dublin Connolly: 109 mi 40 ch (176.2 km); Belfast Lanyon Place: approx. 3 mi 76 ch (6.36 km)
- Platforms: 2
- Tracks: 2

Construction
- Parking: Yes (36 spaces, including 3 accessible spaces)
- Cycle facilities: Yes (10 unsheltered spaces)
- Accessible: Yes

Other information
- Station code: FY
- Fare zone: 1

History
- Electrified: No
- Original company: Great Northern Railway (Ireland)
- Pre-grouping: Great Northern Railway (Ireland)
- Post-grouping: Great Northern Railway (Ireland)

Key dates
- 9 February 1907: Opened as Finaghy Halt

Passengers
- 2022/23: 164,343
- 2023/24: ▲195,978
- 2024/25: ▼139,190
- 2025/26: ▲217,932

Services
Preceding station	NI Railways	Following station
Dunmurry towards Lisburn, Portadown or Newry	Portadown Line	Balmoral towards Belfast Grand Central

Historical railways
Preceding station	Historical railways	Following station
Dunmurry; Line and station open	Great Northern Railway (Ireland); Belfast–Portadown	Balmoral; Line and station open
- NI Railways; Translink; NI railway stations
Route map
(Click to expand)
Location
- Location within Northern Ireland Location within island of Ireland

Finaghy railway station is located in the townland of Ballyfinaghy (Finaghy) in south Belfast, County Antrim, Northern Ireland. It is located on the Dublin-Belfast line. The Great Northern Railway of Ireland opened the station on 9 February 1907.

== History ==
The station opened as Finaghy Halt on 9 February 1907, having been built by the Great Northern Railway (Ireland). Much of the surrounding area was developed after the station opened, with Finaghy Park expanding during the inter-war years as Belfast's suburbs spread south-west along the Lisburn Road.

Following changes to railway ownership in Northern Ireland, the station later came under the control of the Ulster Transport Authority. Railway operations were briefly branded as Ulster Transport Railways from 1966 before Northern Ireland Railways was established in 1967.

On 21 July 1972, during Bloody Friday, a bomb in a hijacked lorry exploded on the railway bridge carrying Finaghy Road North over the line. The explosion caused minor damage to the bridge and its parapet.

== Facilities ==
Finaghy is an unmanned station with two platforms. Both platforms have step-free access via ramps and sheltered seating. A ticket vending machine is provided, along with timetable information and audio announcements; there are no passenger information displays.

The station has a 36-space car park, including three accessible spaces, as well as ten bicycle parking spaces. CCTV is in operation. There are no public toilets, shops or refreshment facilities.

== Service ==
From Mondays to Saturdays there is a half-hourly service towards Lisburn, Portadown or Newry in one direction, and to Belfast Grand Central in the other. Extra services operate at peak times, and the service reduces to hourly operation in the evenings.

On Sundays there is an hourly service in each direction.

The Enterprise service between Belfast Grand Central and Dublin Connolly passes through Finaghy but does not call at the station.

== Gallery ==
IE 201 Running the Enterprise Service to Belfast Central (now Lanyon Place)

Two trains await departure

The station in 1970 with the original GNR(I) waiting shelter

The road bridge above the station

A Great Victoria Street service in 2012
