= City Hospital railway station =

Railway station in Belfast

City Hospital
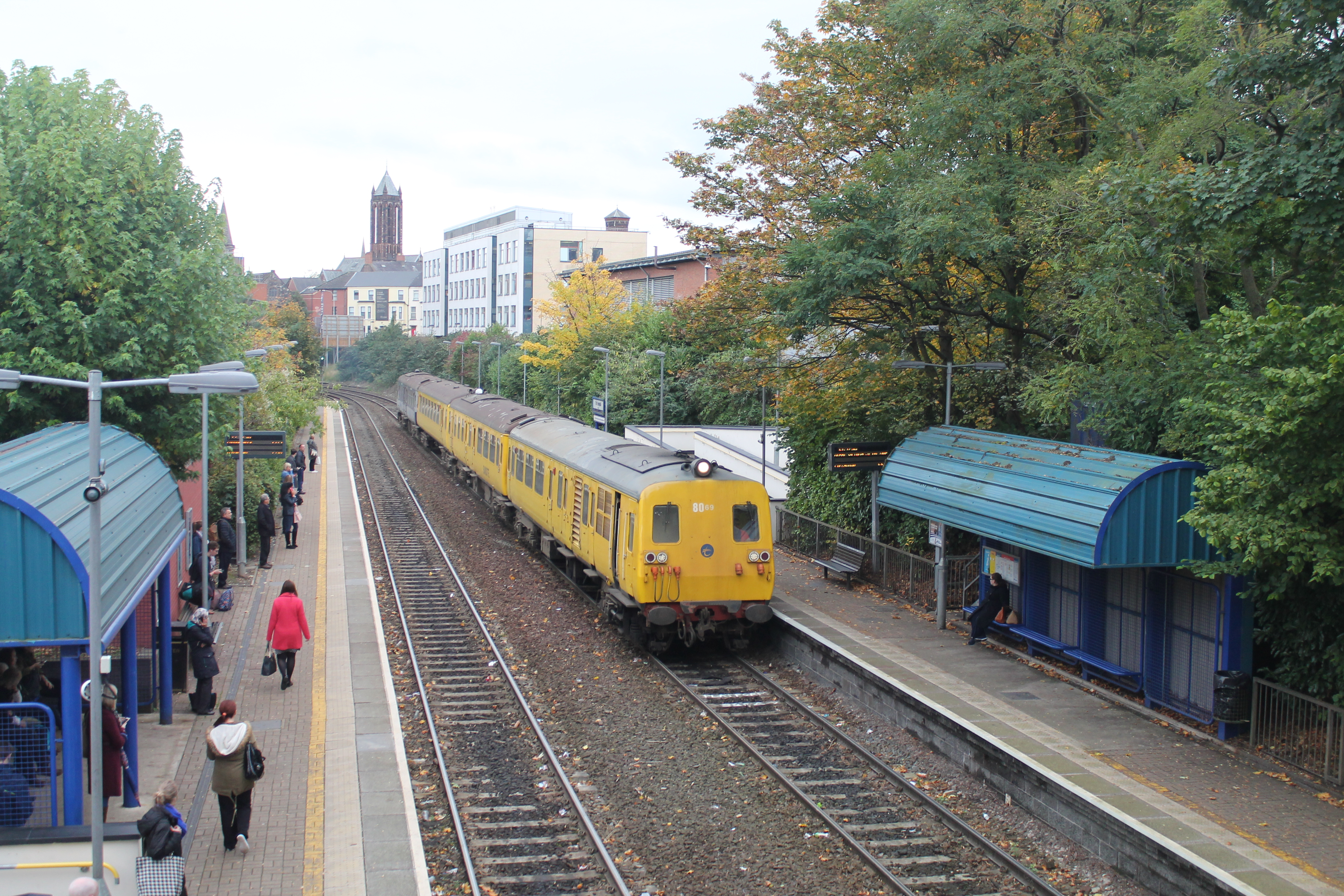

General information
- Location: Donegall Road, Belfast; Northern Ireland
- Coordinates: 54.5887°N 5.9402°W
- System: Translink rail halt
- Owner: NI Railways
- Operator: NI Railways
- Lines: Bangor Line; Derry Line; Larne Line
- Platforms: 2
- Tracks: 2

Construction
- Structure type: At-grade

Other information
- Station code: CH
- Fare zone: 1

Key dates
- 6 October 1986: Opened
- 2008: Refurbished

Passengers
- 2022/23: 332,032
- 2023/24: ▲430,180
- 2024/25: ▼376,395
- 2025/26: ▲473,194

Services
| Preceding station | NI Railways | Following station |
|---|---|---|
| Botanic towards Bangor | Bangor Line | Belfast Grand Central Terminus |
| Botanic towards Carrickfergus, Whitehead, Larne Town or Larne Harbour | Larne Line | Belfast Grand Central Terminus |
| Botanic towards Coleraine, Portrush or Derry~Londonderry | Derry Line | Belfast Grand Central Terminus |

Historical railways
| Preceding station | Historical railways | Following station |
|---|---|---|
| Botanic; Line and station open | NI Railways; Belfast–Derry / Belfast–Newry (1986–1995) | Adelaide; Line and station open |
| Botanic; Line and station open | NI Railways; Belfast–Bangor / Belfast–Larne / Belfast–Derry / Belfast–Newry (1995–2024) | Great Victoria Street; Line open, station closed |
- NI Railways; Translink; NI railway stations
Route map
(Click to expand)
Location
- Location within Northern Ireland Location within island of Ireland

City Hospital railway station, situated on Donegall Road, serves Belfast City Hospital and the surrounding area of south Belfast, Northern Ireland. It is one of the four stations located in the city centre, the others being Botanic, Lanyon Place, and Belfast Grand Central.

The station opened on 6 October 1986, and is very close to Botanic Station.

== Service ==
On weekdays, there is a half-hourly service on the Bangor Line between Belfast Grand Central and Bangor, with extra trains at peak times. The Derry~Londonderry Line operates an hourly service between Belfast Grand Central and Derry~Londonderry, with additional trains to Coleraine at peak times. The Larne Line operates a half-hourly service to Larne Harbour and Whitehead, with the terminus alternating between the two every half-hour. Extra trains operate to Carrickfergus and Larne Town at peak times.

On Saturdays, service patterns remain largely similar except without any additional peak-time trains.

On Sundays, the Bangor Line reduces to an hourly service. The Derry~Londonderry Line alternates its outbound terminus every hour between Derry~Londonderry and Portrush, resulting in a two-hourly service to stations beyond Coleraine. The Larne Line also reduces to hourly but continues alternating the terminus between Larne Harbour and Whitehead, resulting in a two-hourly service to stations beyond Whitehead.

During the construction of Grand Central station, City Hospital acted as a temporary terminus for Derry~Londonderry Line and Larne Line trains, with services reversing at Adelaide Depot.

== Gallery ==
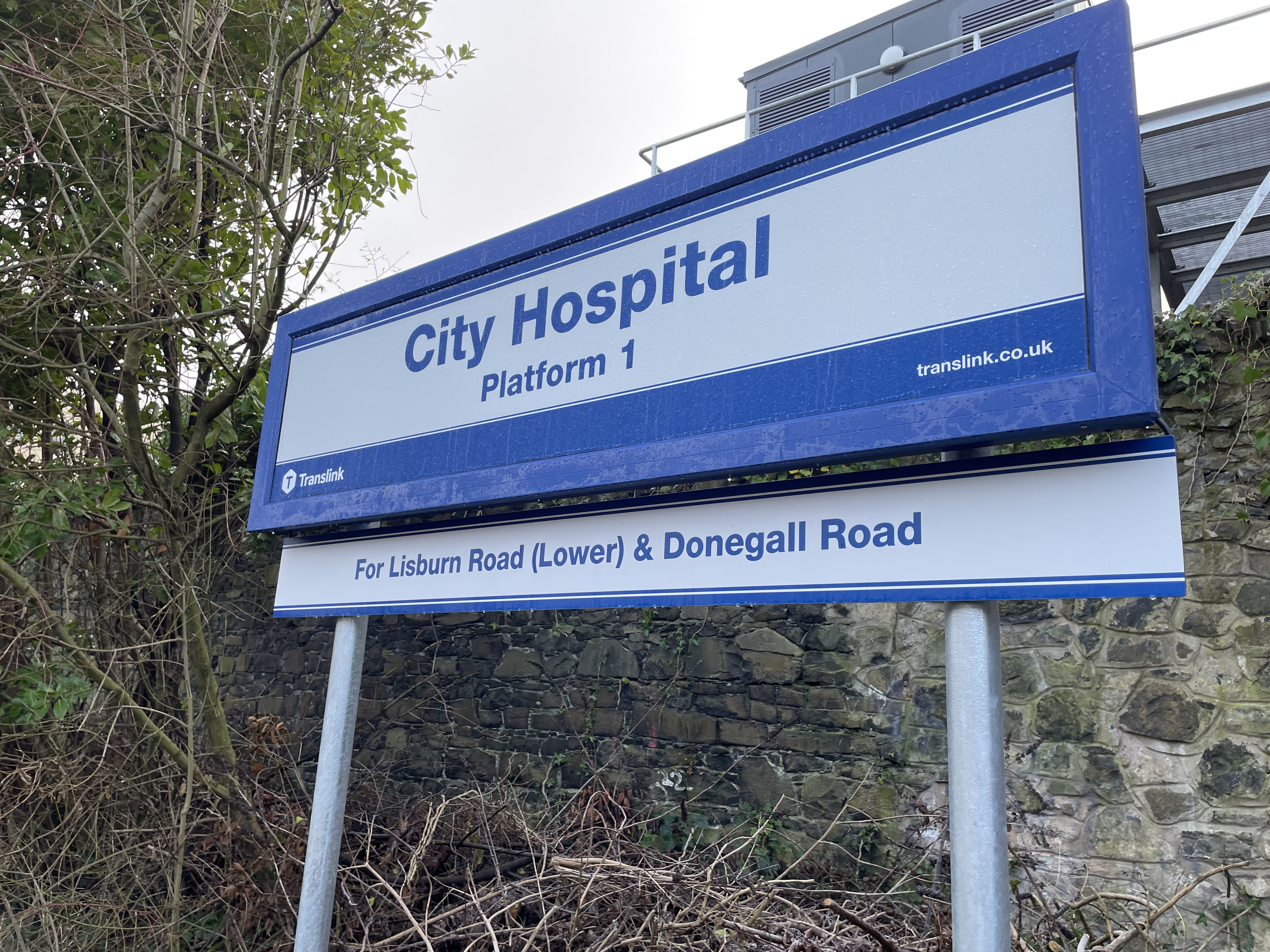
Belfast City Hospital Station sign

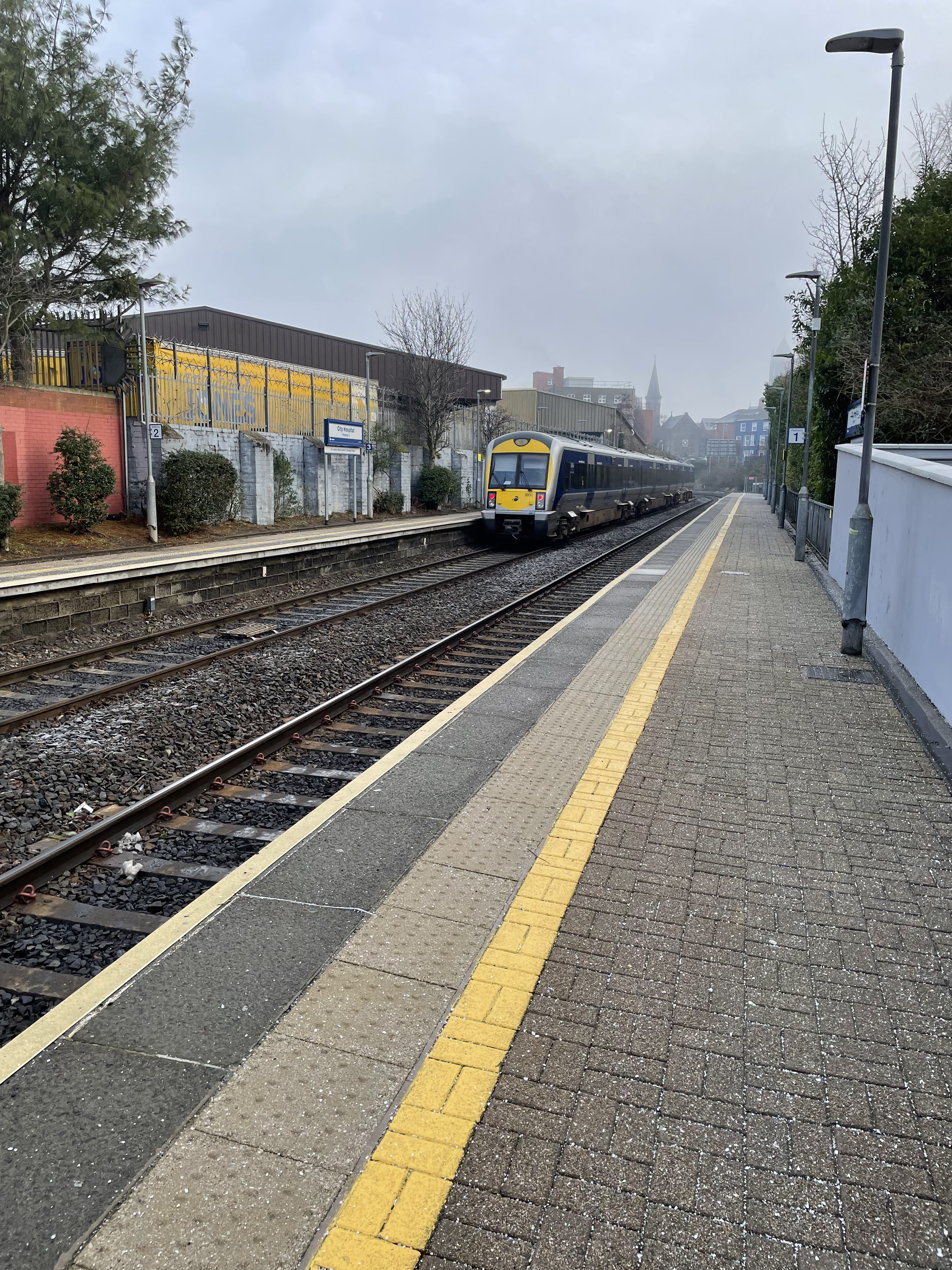
Bangor-bound train at Belfast City Hospital Railway station on 8 January 2025

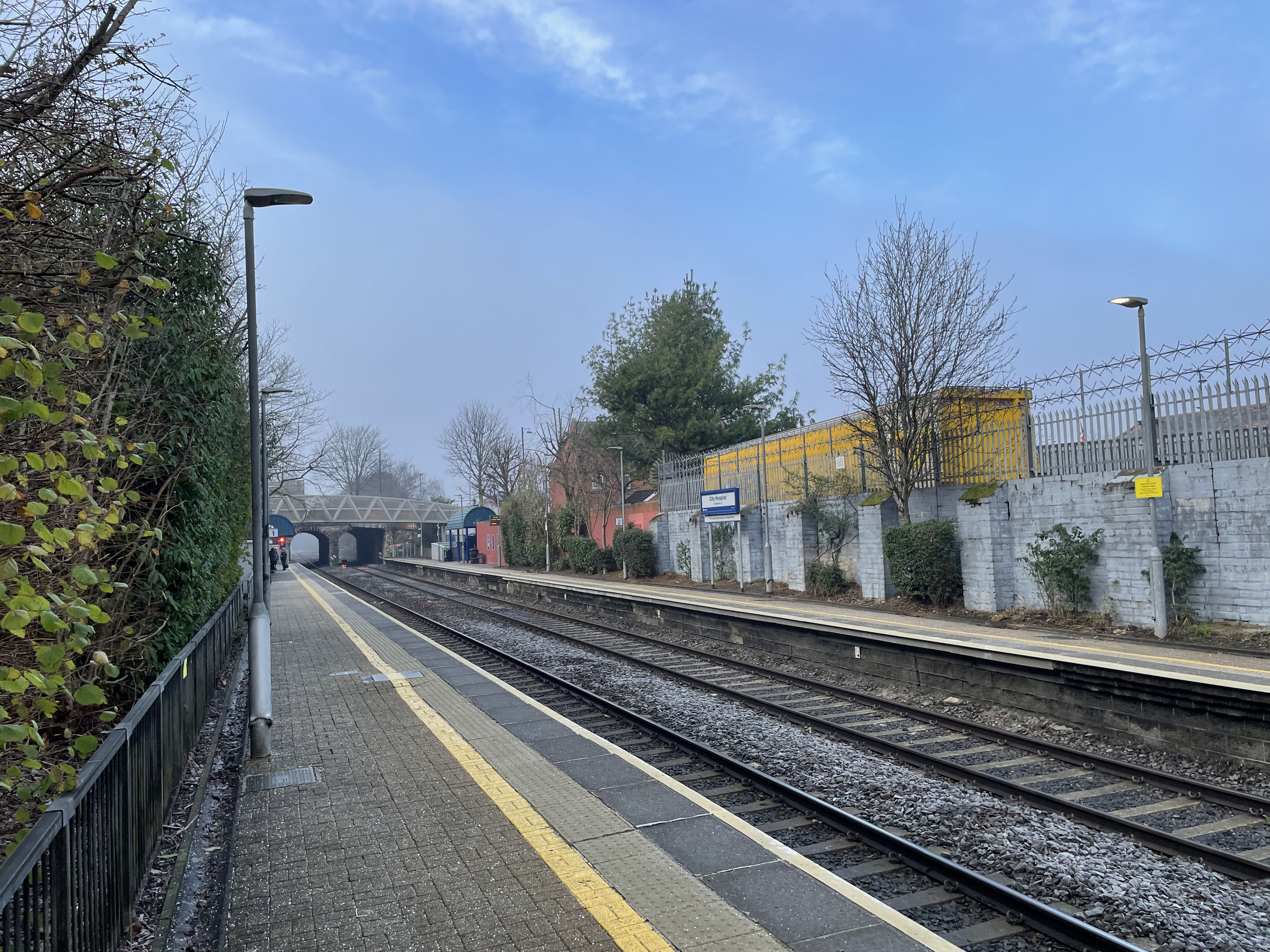
A view down Belfast City Hospital platforms on 8 January 2025

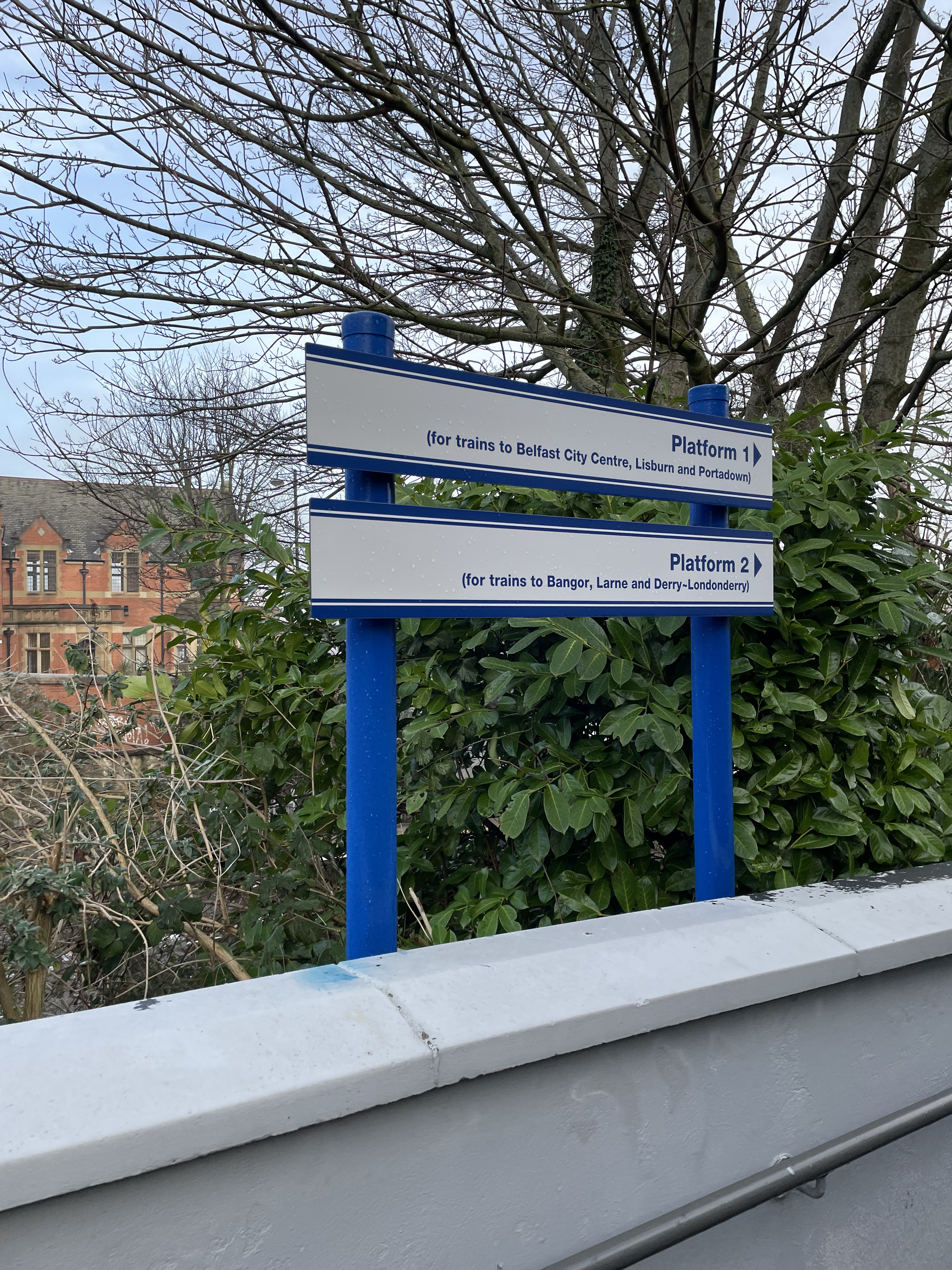
Station platform signs at Belfast City Hospital

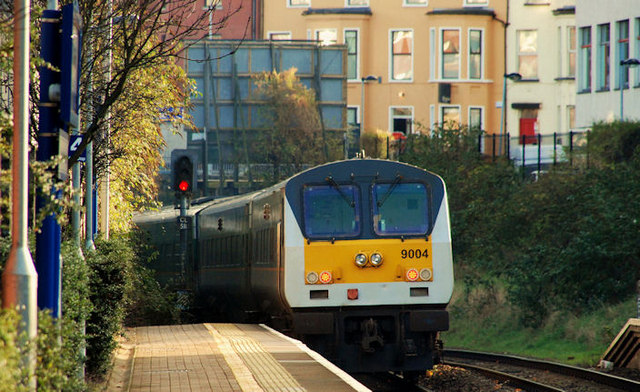
The Enterprise train passing through the station in 2009 on route to Belfast Central; now Lanyon Place

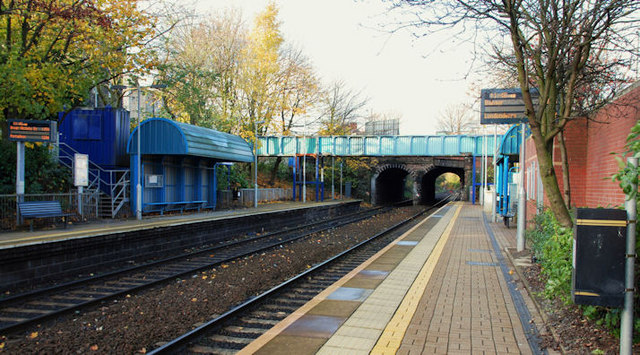
A view of the platforms in 2009 at City Hospital

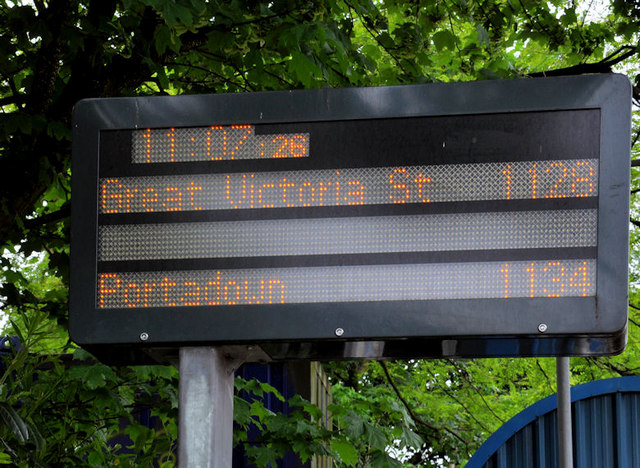
Dot matrix display board at City Hospital in 2009
