= Balmoral railway station =

Station in south Belfast, Northern Ireland

Balmoral
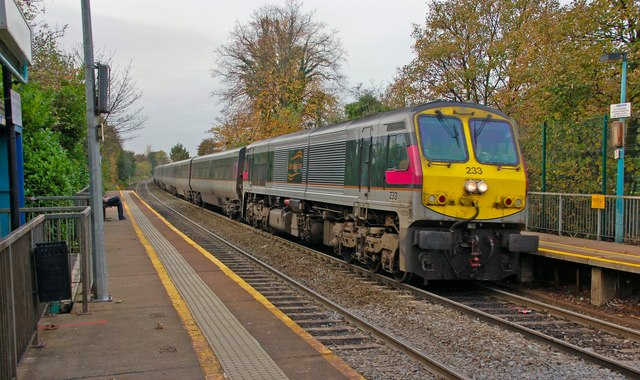
- IÉ 201 Class locomotive passing through Balmoral in 2007

General information
- Location: Lisburn Road, Belfast, BT9 7WD; Belfast; Northern Ireland
- Coordinates: 54.5688°N 5.9682°W
- System: Translink rail halt
- Owner: NI Railways
- Operator: NI Railways
- Line: Dublin–Belfast
- Distance: Dublin Connolly: 110 miles 22 chains (177.5 km); Belfast Lanyon Place: 3 miles 14 chains (5.1 km)
- Platforms: 2
- Tracks: 2

Construction
- Parking: No
- Cycle facilities: No
- Accessible: Yes

Other information
- Station code: BL
- Fare zone: iLink Zone 1
- Website: Station information

History
- Original company: Ulster Railway
- Pre-grouping: Great Northern Railway (Ireland)

Key dates
- 1 November 1858: Opened
- 1870: Platforms extended by 45 metres
- October 1966: Became unstaffed

Passengers
- 2016/17: 101,511
- 2017/18: ▲154,679
- 2018/19: ▲181,339
- 2019/20: ▼175,408
- 2020/21: ▼30,587
- 2021/22: ▲90,506
- 2022/23: ▲172,748
- 2023/24: ▲194,053
- 2024/25: ▼129,703
- 2025/26: ▲211,187

Services
Preceding station	NI Railways	Following station
Finaghy towards Lisburn, Portadown or Newry	Portadown Line	Adelaide towards Belfast Grand Central

Historical railways
Preceding station	Historical railways	Following station
Dunmurry; Line and station open	Ulster Railway; Belfast–Portadown	Great Victoria Street; Line open, station closed
Finaghy; Line and station open	Great Northern Railway (Ireland); Belfast–Dublin	Adelaide; Line and station open
- NI Railways; Translink; NI railway stations
Route map
(Click to expand)
Location
- Location within Northern Ireland Location within island of Ireland
Notes
- Passenger statistics are NIR Total Flow footfall figures; Translink states that these measure journey flow through stages and should not be treated as a count of NIR passenger journeys.

Balmoral railway station is located in the townland of Ballygammon in south Belfast, County Antrim, Northern Ireland. The station opened on 1 November 1858. The platform was extended by 45 metres in 1870 and the station has been unstaffed since October 1966.

It is located near the King's Hall, an exhibition and concert venue and home of the Royal Ulster Agricultural Society.

== Station house ==
There is a station house, which was built in the style of the Great Northern Railway of Ireland. It is now in private ownership and has been extended by the owner.

== Service ==
=== Train services ===
Mondays to Saturdays there is a half-hourly service westbound to Lisburn, Portadown or Newry, and eastbound via Adelaide, to Belfast Grand Central. Extra trains run at peak times, and the service reduces to hourly operation in the evenings.

On Sundays there is an hourly service in each direction.

== Gallery ==
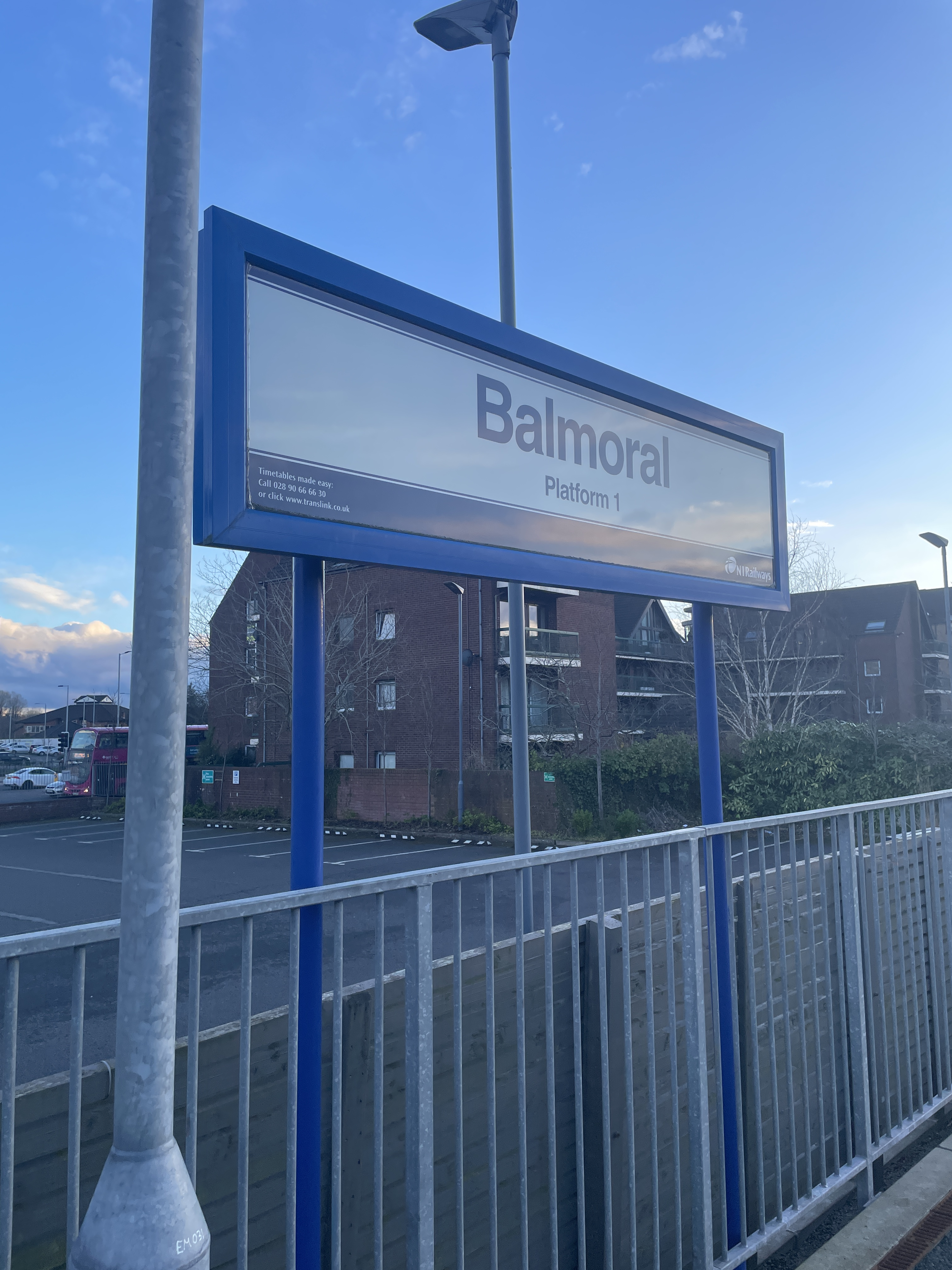
Balmoral station platform signs

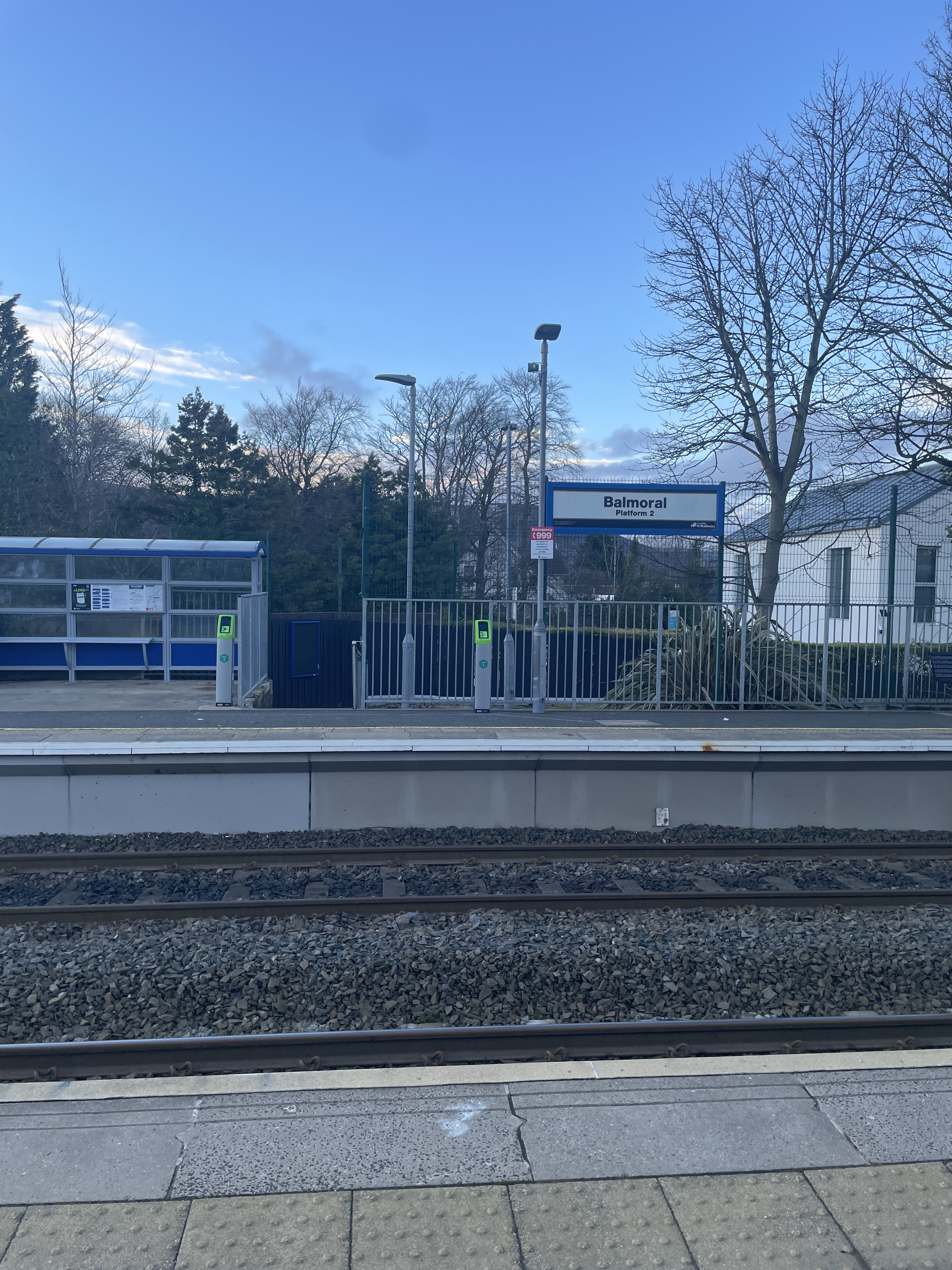
Platform 2 at balmoral station

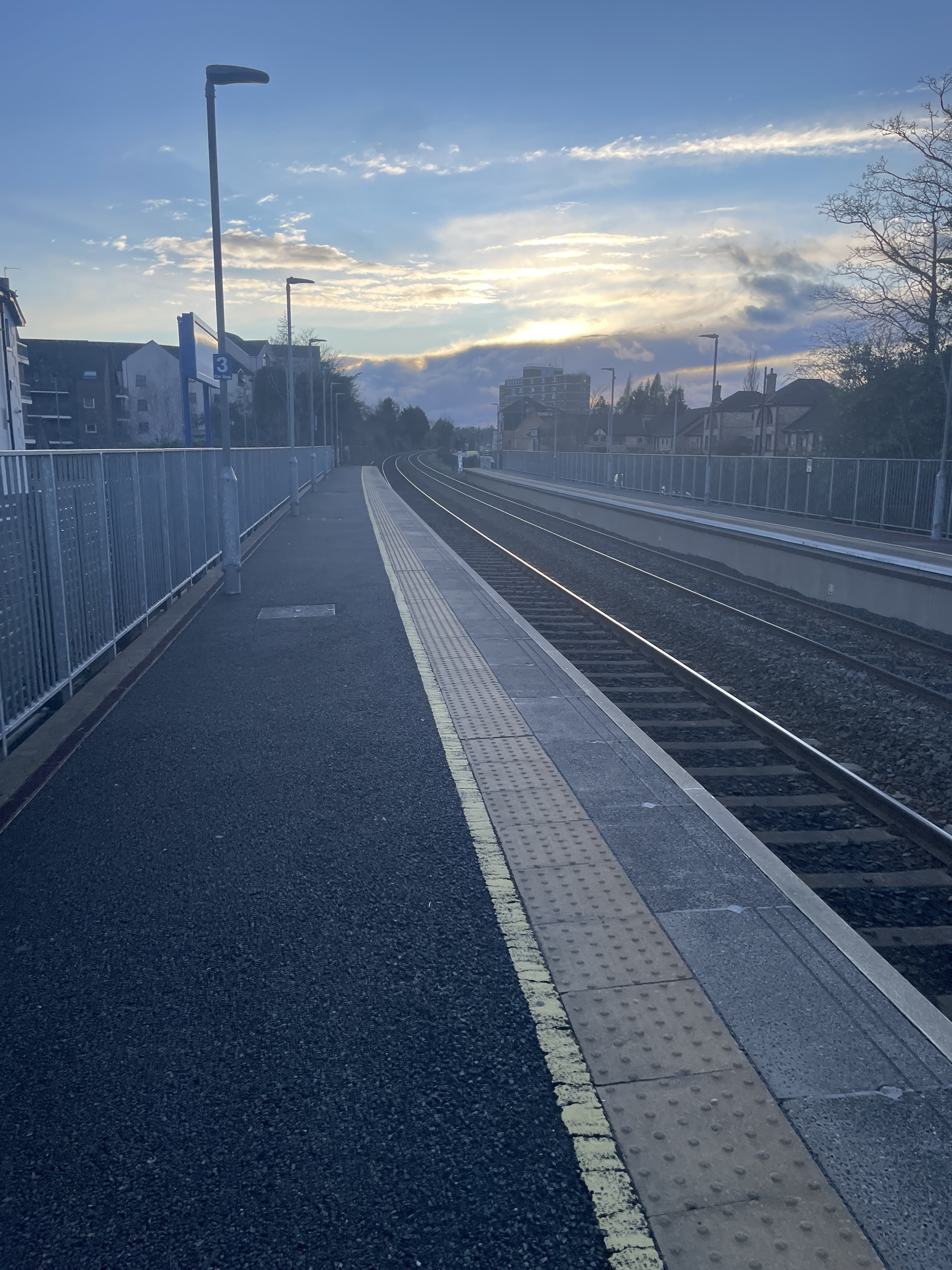
A look at the downline at balmoral

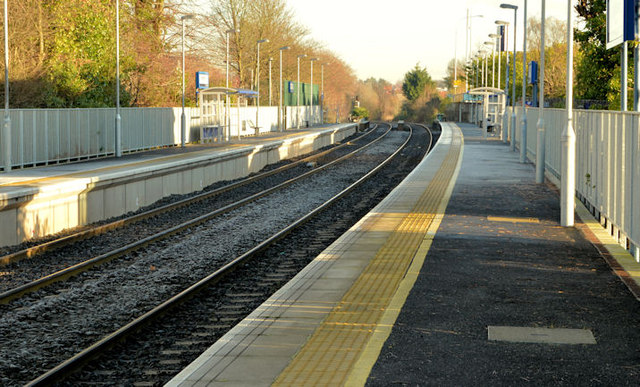
A look on the up line at balmoral

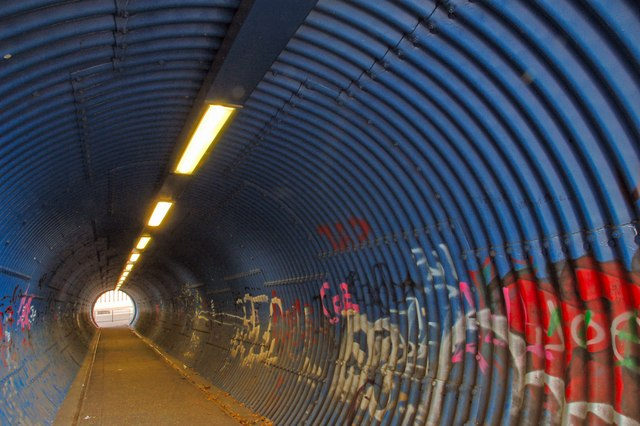
The station underpass used to connect the 2 platforms

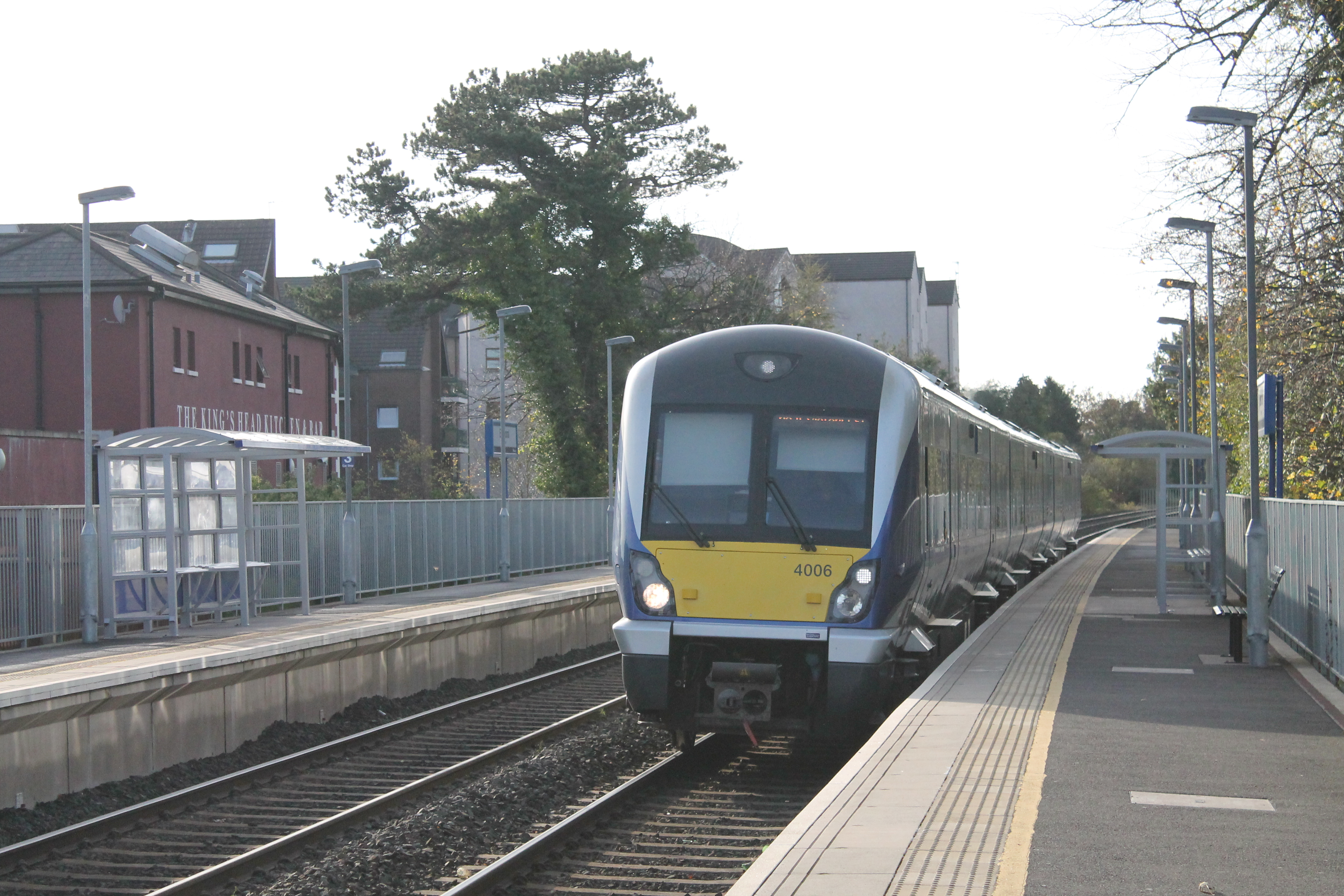
A class 4000 train ready to depart Balmoral for Belfast
