= Finaghy =

Coordinates: 54.5638°N 5.9866°W

Finaghy: Irish: an Fionnachadh
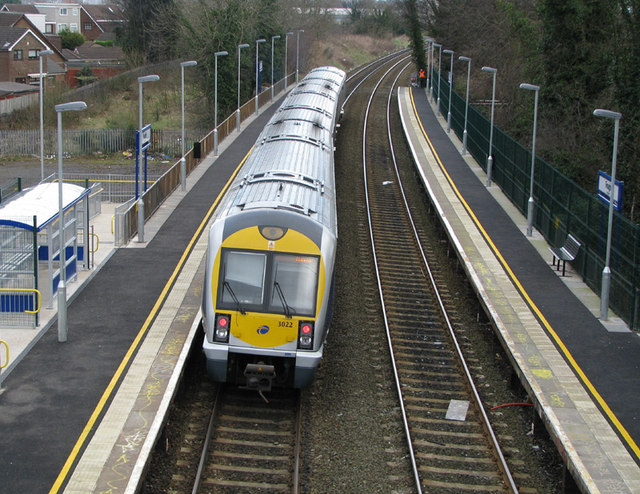
- Finaghy railway station

- Location within Northern Ireland
- Population: 4,529 (2021)
- Irish grid reference: O003360
- District: Belfast City Council
- County: County Antrim
- Country: Northern Ireland
- Sovereign state: United Kingdom
- Post town: BELFAST
- Postcode district: BT10
- Dialling code: 028
- NI Assembly: South Belfast

Finaghy (/ˈfinəxi/ or /ˈfɪnəki/; from Irish an Fionnachadh, meaning 'the white field') is an electoral ward in the Balmoral district of Belfast City Council, and a suburb within the city of Belfast, Northern Ireland. It is based on the townland of Ballyfinaghy (from Irish Baile an Fhionnachaidh).

== History ==
A small community was living in the area since at least the 17th century. The community was involved in the production of linen, which was key to the Lagan Valley area at the time.

In the 1930s, the community gradually started to grow; the local Presbyterian church was founded in 1930. In the 1950s, the city of Belfast grew outwards. Housing estates were built in Finaghy, including Benmore, Locksley and Erinvale, which caused the population to at least double. Finaghy now refers to the area along the Lisburn Road from the King's Hall to the start of Black's Road and between the Malone Road and the M1 Motorway bridge at Finaghy Road North. The heart of the area is Finaghy crossroads, where the Lisburn Road intersects with Finaghy Road North and Finaghy Road South.

== Demography ==
=== Population ===
At the 2021 United Kingdom census, Finaghy had a population of 4,529 inhabitants.

== Amenities ==
Finaghy has no pubs or betting shops as it was stipulated in land deeds that there were to be no public houses on the land belonging to Ballyfinaghy House, the past residence of Ralph Charley, a wealthy Belfast linen merchant. Behind the crossroads is the new Finaghy Campus, which houses a freshly built public library, the non-denominational Finaghy Primary School and community playing fields.

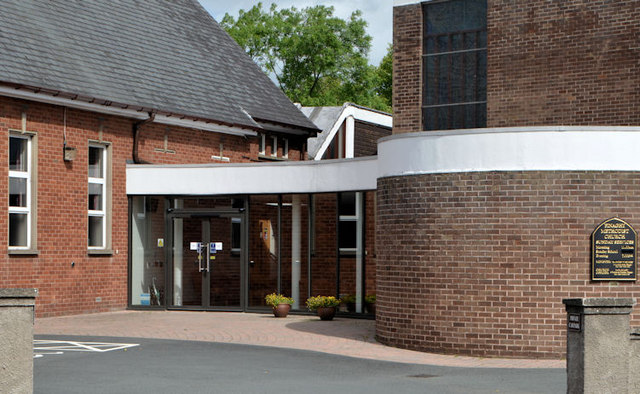
Finaghy Methodist church, Belfast

Finaghy is home to several Protestant congregations – Presbyterian, Methodist, Church of Ireland, Plymouth Brethren and Baptist. There is also a large Roman Catholic congregation in nearby Dunmurry. Aside from the older Presbyterian Church, which now has a community centre, there is a relatively modern Methodist church which has a representation of Jacob's Ladder in its skyline. The Church of Ireland church is dedicated to St. Polycarp. St. Anne's Roman Catholic parish church and centre is located opposite the top of the Black's Road.

St Anne's Roman Catholic Primary School is situated next to St. Anne's Catholic church. Also nearby is Rathmore Grammar School, a Catholic grammar school. Malone Integrated College, a co-educational secondary school opened in 1997, is also located in the area.

== Sport ==
Finaghy Football Club play in the Northern Amateur Football League, and were originally known as Lowe Memorial YM when they were founded in 1962

== See also ==
- Finaghy railway station
