= Crawfordsburn Viaduct =

Coordinates: 54.6629°N 5.7295°W

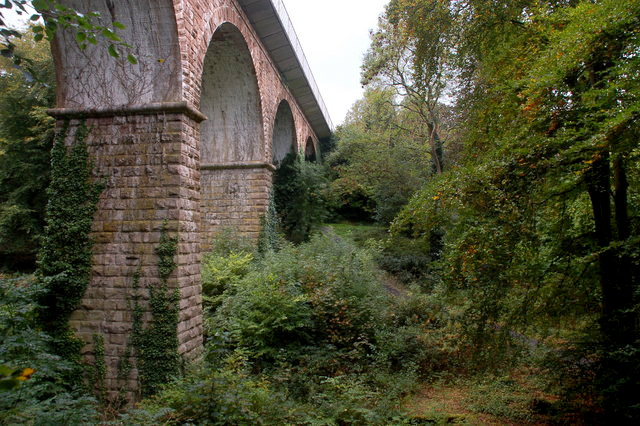
The viaduct in 2006

The Crawfordsburn Viaduct is a railway viaduct in Crawfordsburn, County Down, Northern Ireland.

== Design ==
The viaduct is built out of Scrabo sandstone, and carries a double-track railway at a width of 10 metres across a distance of 100 metres. It has five arches and cast-iron lattice parapets. It was designed by Charles Lanyon.

== History ==
The viaduct was constructed by the Belfast, Holywood & Bangor Railway (BHBR), beginning in 1863, with the foundation stone being laid on October 3 of that year, and finishing in 1865, with the first passenger train to cross it being on May 18. The opening of the viaduct was attended by Charles Lanyon, Lord Dufferin, Major Crawford, and BHBR chairman Robert Ward.

It is alleged that some time before BCDR takeover in 1884 that a child fell from the viaduct and was saved only by his clothes catching on a tree.

The viaduct, along with the rest of the Holywood - Bangor line, was upgraded from single to double track between 1897 and 1902, some 13 years after having been taken over by the Belfast and County Down Railway.

The Ulster Transport Authority took over the line in 1948, and with it, the viaduct. It changed hands once again in 1968 becoming the property of Northern Ireland Railways, who removed Lanyon's foundation stone in 1989 on the centenary of his death.

== Today ==
The viaduct remains in use today, carrying the NI Railways Belfast–Bangor line across Crawfordsburn Glen. Off-peak there are two trains per hour in each direction across the viaduct. It can be seen from Crawfordsburn Country Park, the entrance to which is half an hour's walk from the nearest railway station, Helen's Bay. (Crawfordsburn did have its own railway station at one point but it closed in 1997). It became a listed building in 1975.
