= Seahill =

Coordinates: 54.664037°N 5.764948°W

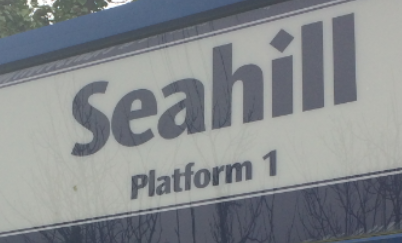
- Seahill railway station

- Location within County Down
- Population: 1,018 (2011 Census)
- District: North Down
- County: County Down
- Country: Northern Ireland
- Sovereign state: United Kingdom
- Post town: HOLYWOOD
- Postcode district: BT18
- Dialling code: 028
- UK Parliament: North Down

Seahill is a village on the northern coast of County Down, Northern Ireland. It is within the townland of Ballyrobert, with Holywood to the west and Helen's Bay and Crawfordsburn to the east. Seahill was once a stand-alone settlement but it is now joined to Holywood and the Greater Belfast conurbation. In the 2011 Census it had a population of 1,018 people.

== 2011 Census ==
Seahill is classified as a village by the NI Statistics and Research Agency (NISRA) (i.e. with population between 1,000 and 2,250 people). On Census day (27 March 2011) there were 1,018 people living in Seahill. Of these:

- 17.0% were aged under 17 years and 24.6% were aged 65 and over
- 50.1% of the population were male and 49.9% were female
- 62.2% identified as Christian, 23.0% as non-religious and 14.1% as Roman Catholic
- 1.4% of people aged 16–74 were unemployed

== Transport ==
Seahill railway station was opened on 4 April 1966.

== Notable people ==
- Jessica Reynolds, actress

== See also ==
- List of towns and villages in Northern Ireland
