= Artillery battery =

Artillery unit size designation

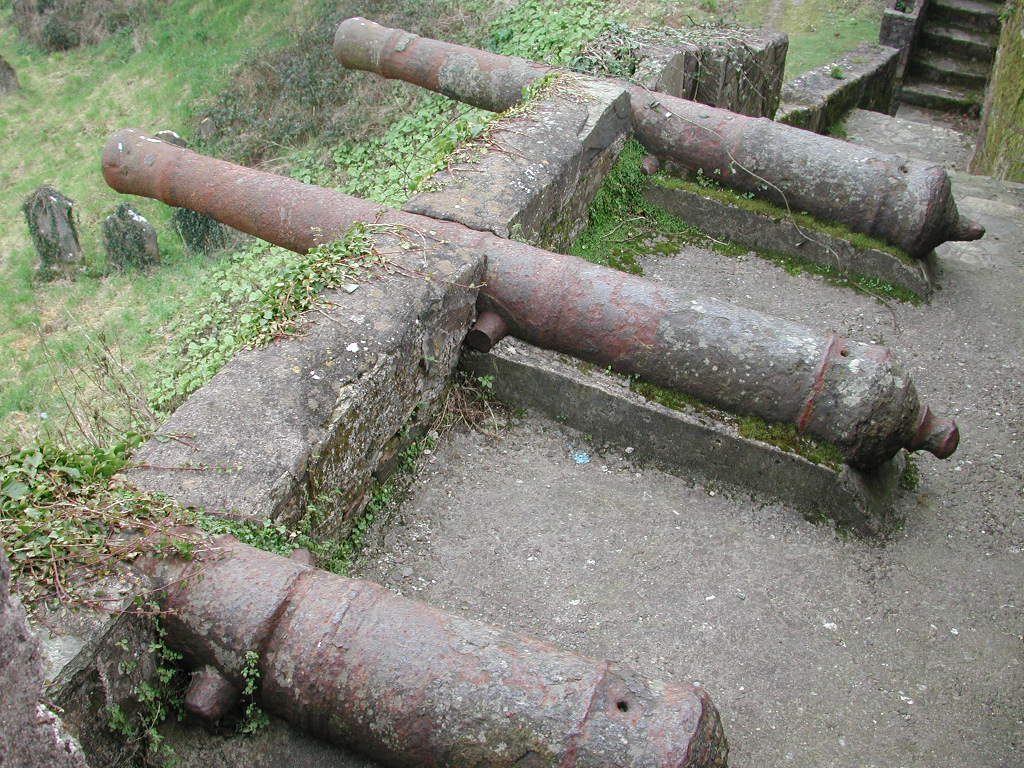
Remains of a battery of English cannon at Youghal, County Cork

In military organizations, an artillery battery is a unit or multiple systems of artillery, mortar systems, rocket artillery, multiple rocket launchers, surface-to-surface missiles, ballistic missiles, cruise missiles, grouped to facilitate better battlefield communication and command and control, as well as to provide dispersion for its constituent gunnery crews and their systems. The term is also used in a naval context to describe groups of guns on warships.

== Land usage ==
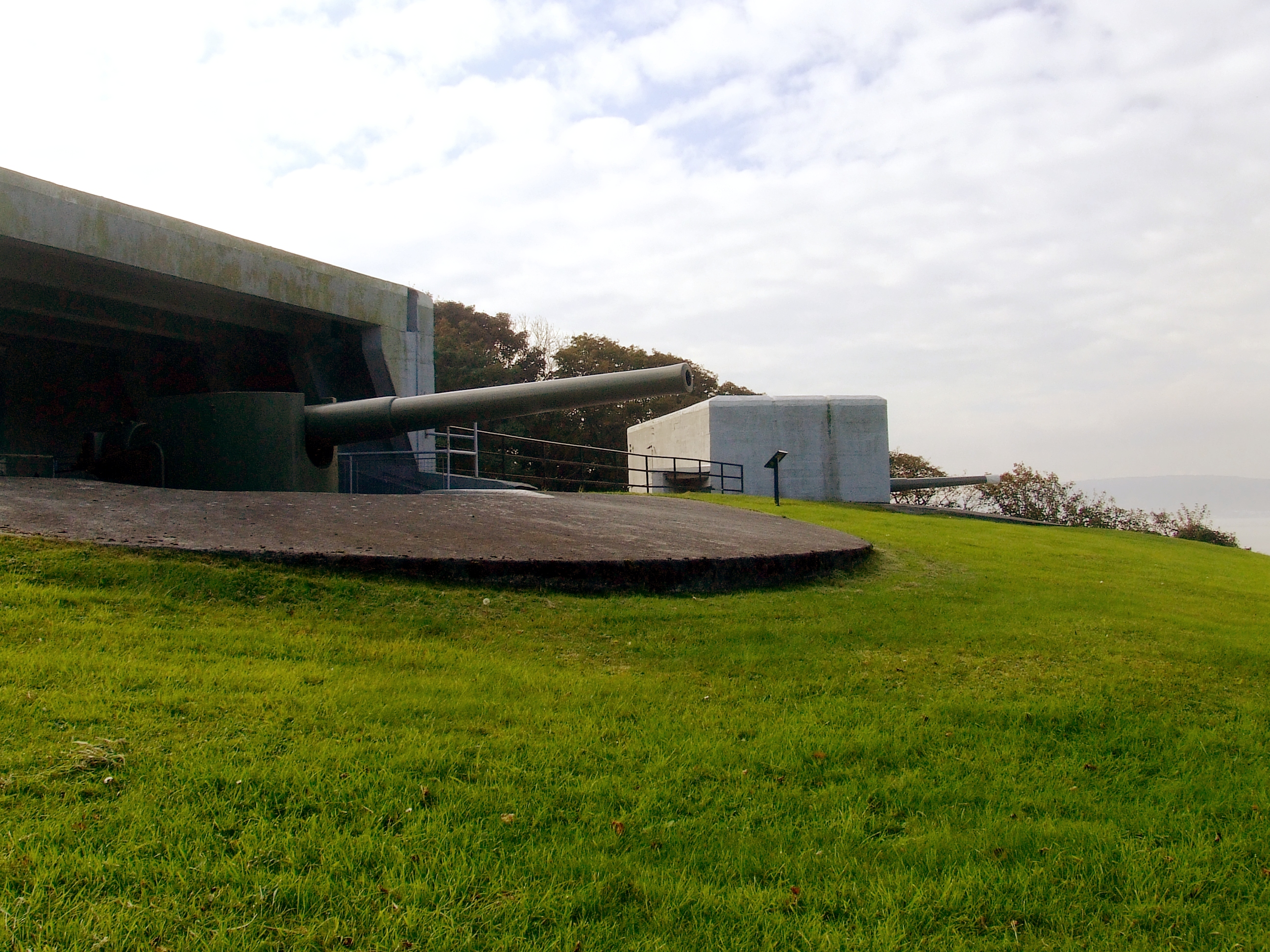
A coast battery in Crawfordsburn, County Down, Northern Ireland

Historically the term "battery" referred to a cluster of cannons in action as a group, either in a temporary field position during a battle or at the siege of a fortress or a city. Such batteries could be a mixture of cannon, howitzer, or mortar types. A siege could involve many batteries at different sites around the besieged place. The term also came to be used for a group of cannons in a fixed fortification, for coastal or frontier defence. During the 18th century "battery" began to be used as an organizational term for a permanent unit of artillery in peace and war, although horse artillery sometimes used "troop" and fixed position artillery "company". They were usually organised with between 6 and 12 ordnance pieces, often including cannon and howitzers. By the late 19th century "battery" had become standard mostly replacing company or troop.

In the 20th century the term was generally used for the company level sub-unit of an artillery branch including field, air-defence, anti-tank and position (coastal and frontier defences). 20th-century firing batteries have been equipped with mortars, guns, howitzers, rockets and missiles.

=== Mobile batteries ===
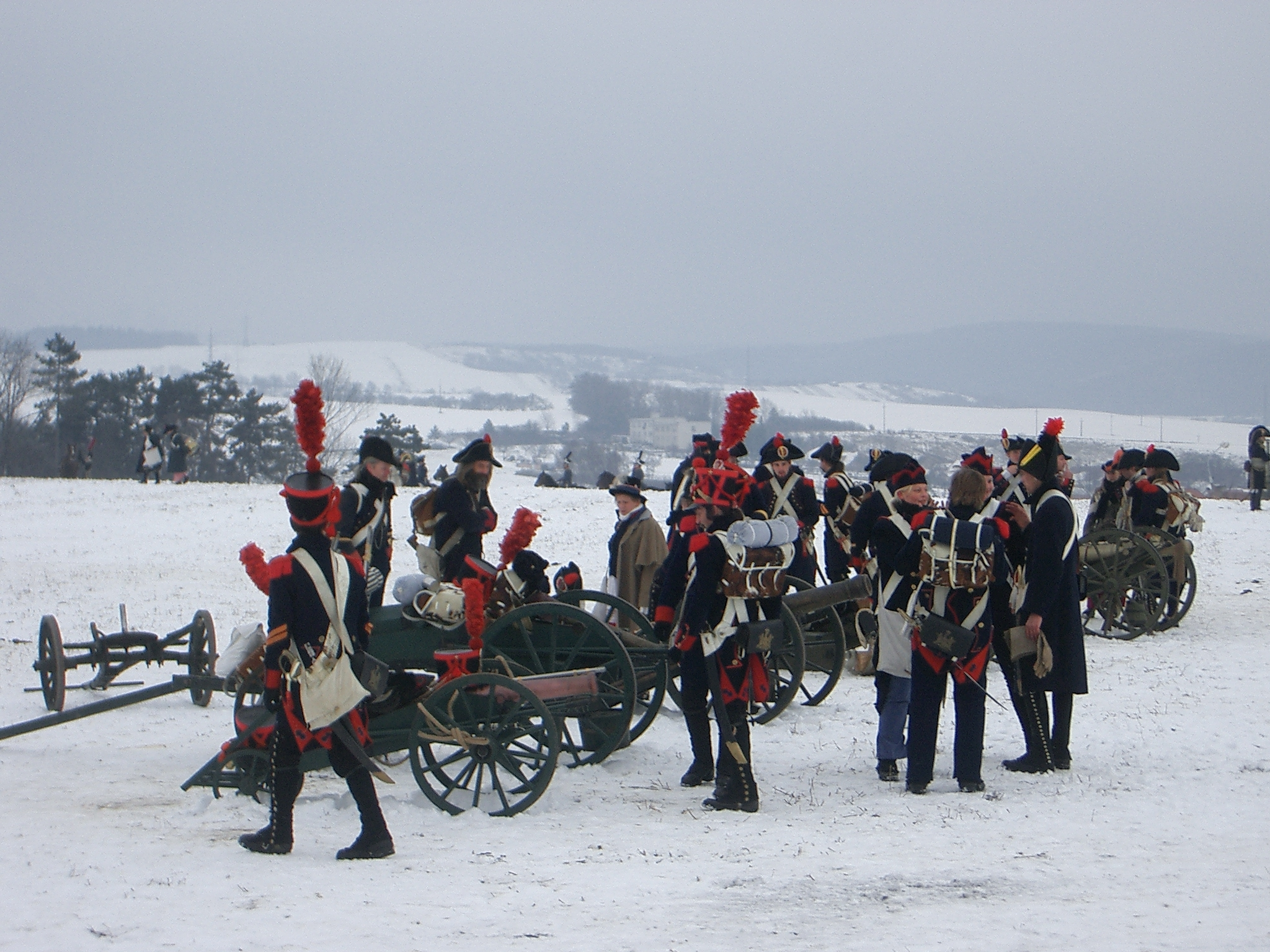
French Napoleonic artillery battery. Photo taken during the 200th anniversary reenactment of the battle of Austerlitz which took place in 1805.

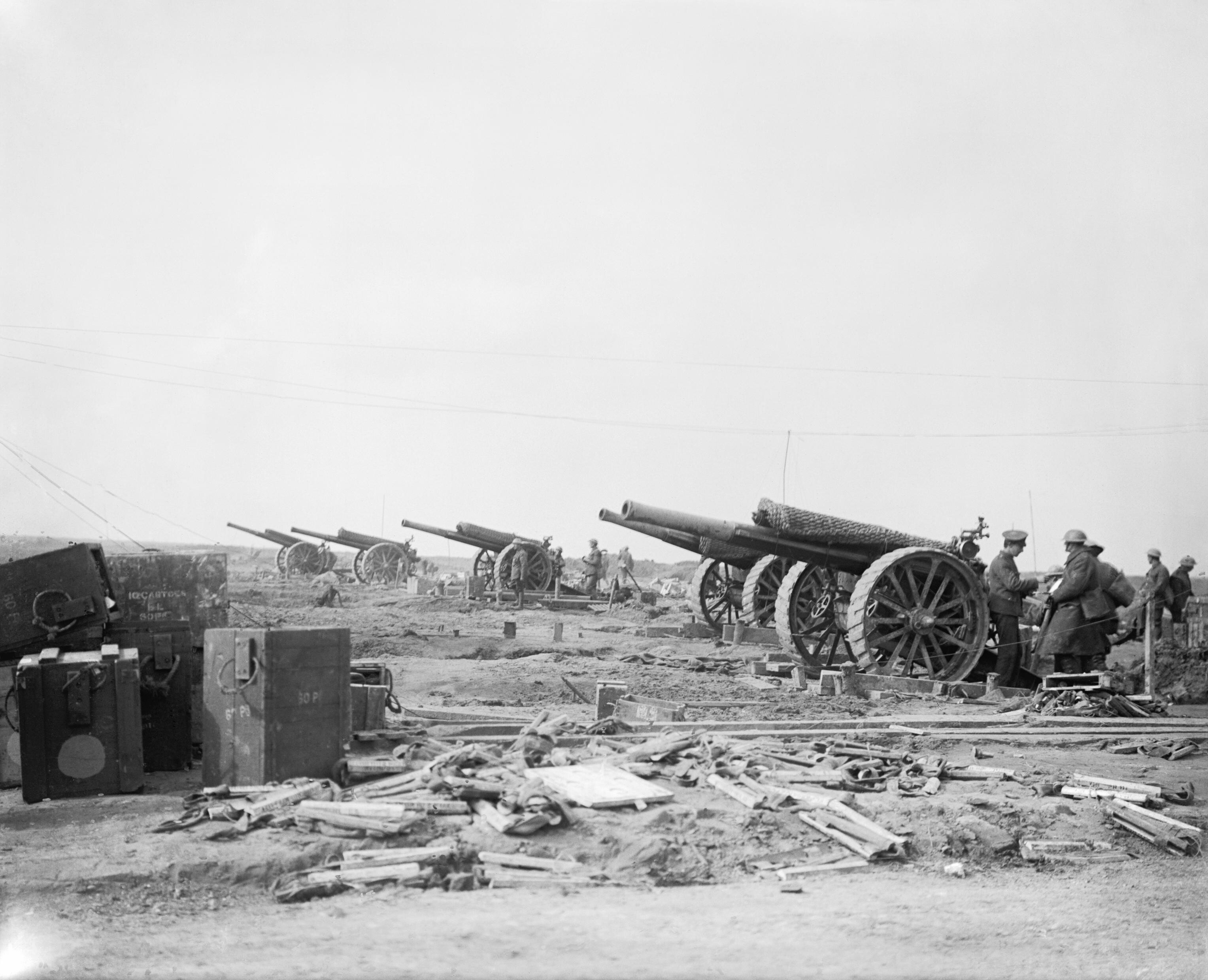
60-pounder battery at Arras, 1917

During the Napoleonic Wars some armies started grouping their batteries into larger administrative and field units. Groups of batteries combined for field combat employment called Grand Batteries by Napoleon.

Administratively batteries were usually grouped in battalions, regiments or squadrons and these developed into tactical organisations. These were further grouped into regiments, simply "group" or brigades, that may be wholly composed of artillery units or combined arms in composition. To further concentrate fire of individual batteries, from World War I they were grouped into "artillery divisions" in a few armies. Coastal artillery sometimes had completely different organizational terms based on shore defence sector areas.

Batteries also have sub-divisions, which vary across armies and periods but often translate into the English "platoon" or "troop" with individual ordnance systems called a "section" or "sub-section", where a section comprises two artillery pieces.

The rank of a battery commander has also varied, but is usually a lieutenant, captain, or major.

The number of guns, howitzers, mortars or launchers in an organizational battery has also varied, with the calibre of guns usually being an important consideration. In the 19th century four to 12 guns was usual as the optimum number to maneuver into the gun line. By the late 19th century, a mountain artillery battery was divided into a gun line and an ammunition line. The gun line consisted of six guns (five mules to a gun) and 12 ammunition mules.

During the American Civil War, artillery batteries often consisted of six field pieces for the Union Army and four for the Confederate States Army, although this varied. Batteries were divided into sections of two guns apiece, each section normally under the command of a lieutenant. The full battery was typically commanded by a captain. Often, particularly as the war progressed, individual batteries were grouped into battalions under a major or colonel of artillery.

In the 20th century it varied between four and 12 for field artillery (even 16 if mortars), or even two pieces for very heavy pieces. Other types of artillery such as anti-tank or anti-aircraft have sometimes been larger. Some batteries have been "dual-equipped" with two different types of gun or mortar, and taking whichever was more appropriate when they deployed for operations.

From the late 19th century field artillery batteries started to become more complex organisations. First they needed the capability to carry adequate ammunition, typically each gun could only carry about 40 rounds in its limber so additional wagons were added to the battery, typically about two per gun. The introduction of indirect fire in the early 20th century necessitated two other groups, firstly observers who deployed some distance forward of the gun line, secondly a small staff on the gun position to undertake the calculations to convert the orders from the observers into data that could be set on the gun sights. This in turn led to the need for signalers, which further increased as the need to concentrate the fire of dispersed batteries emerged and the introduction of fire control staff at artillery headquarters above the batteries.

=== Fixed battery ===
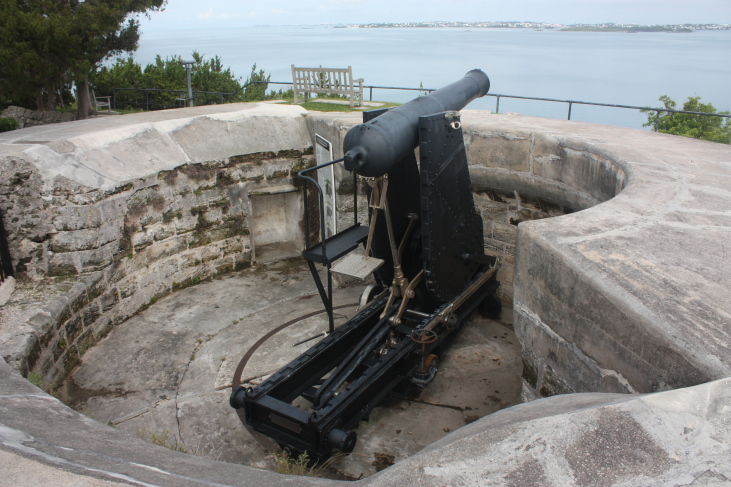
64-pounder rifled muzzle-loader (RML) gun on Moncrieff disappearing mount, at Scaur Hill Fort, a fixed battery of coastal artillery in Bermuda

Fixed artillery refers to guns or howitzers on mounts that were either anchored in one spot (though capable of being moved for purposes of traverse and elevation), or on carriages intended to be moved only for the purposes of aiming, and not for tactical repositioning. Historical versions often closely resembled naval cannon of their day, "garrison carriages," like naval carriages, were short, heavy, and had four small wheels meant for rolling on relatively smooth, hard surfaces. Later, both naval and garrison carriages evolved traversing platforms and pivoting mounts. Such mounts were typically used in forts, or permanent defensive batteries, such as coastal artillery. Fixed batteries could be equipped with much larger guns than field artillery units could transport, and the gun emplacement was only one part of an extensive installation that included magazines and systems to deliver ammunition from the magazines to the guns. Improvements in mobile artillery, naval and ground; air attack; and precision guided weapons have limited fixed position's usefulness.

=== NATO ===
NATO Map Symbols
An artillery battery
A mechanized artillery battery
a surface to surface missile battery
a target acquisition battery

Within NATO member nations, it is typical to label company sized organizations of artillery as "batteries." NATO defines a company as "larger than a platoon, but smaller than a battalion" while being a "unit consisting of two or more platoons, usually of the same type, with a headquarters and a limited capacity for self-support." The standard NATO symbol for a company consists of a single vertical line placed above a framed unit icon.

Names for batteries in NATO member armed forces
| Belgium | Batterie |
| British | Battery |
| Bulgaria | Batareja (Батарея) |
| Canadian | Battery |
| Czech Republic | Baterie |
| Denmark | Batteri |
| Estonia | Patarei |
| Finland | Patteri |
| French | Batterie |
| German | Batterie |
| Hungarian | Üteg |
| Italian | Batteria |
| Lithuanian | Baterija |
| Latvian | Baterija |
| Netherlands | Batterij |
| Norway | Batteri |
| Polish | Bateria |
| Portuguese | Bateria |
| Romania | Bateria |
| Spain | Bateria |
| Turkey | Batarya |
| USA | Battery |

== Naval usage ==
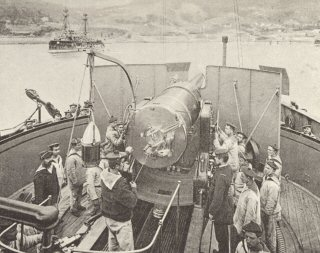
Barbette of the French battleship Redoutable

"Battery" is a relatively modern term at sea. Advanced warships in the Age of Sail, such as the ship of the line, mounted dozens of similar cannons grouped in broadsides, sometimes spread over several decks. This remained the standard main weapon layout for centuries, until the mid-19th century evolution of the naval rifle and revolving gun turrets came to displace fixed cannon.

The first operational use of a rotating turret was on the American ironclad USS Monitor, designed during the American Civil War by John Ericsson. Open barbettes were also used to house their main batteries on rotating mounts. Both designs allowed naval engineers to dramatically reduce the number of guns present in the battery, by giving a handful of guns the ability to concentrate on either side of the ship. In time this trend reversed, with a proliferation of weapons of multiple calibers being arranged somewhat haphazardly about a vessel, many in mounts on the hull or superstructure with limited travel. Confusion also arose when combinations of large caliber "main battery" and smaller "secondary battery" weapons of mixed offensive and defensive use were deployed.

This began to be resolved with the 1906 launching of the revolutionary "all big gun" battleship HMS Dreadnought. It shipped a main battery of ten heavy caliber guns, and a smaller secondary battery for self-defense. This leap in heavy offensive armament from a standard four large caliber guns to a main battery of ten made all other battleships obsolete overnight, as the weight of broadside it could unleash, and overwhelming rate of fire a superior number of similar weapons could sustain, could overwhelm any similarly sized warship.

Cut-away illustration of a triple 16"/50 caliber Mark 7 gun turret. Three of these formed the main battery of Iowa-class battleships.

A third, or tertiary battery, of weapons lighter than the secondary battery was typically mounted. To simplify the design many later ships used dual-purpose guns to combine the functions of the secondary battery and the heavier guns of the tertiary batteries. Many dual-purpose guns also served in an anti-aircraft role. In addition, dedicated light-caliber rapid-fire anti-aircraft weapons were deployed, often in the scores. An example of this combination was the German battleship Bismarck, which carried a main battery of eight 380 mm (15 in) guns, a secondary battery of twelve 150 mm (5.9 in) guns for defense against destroyers and torpedo boats, as well as a tertiary battery of various anti-aircraft guns ranging in caliber from 105-to-20 mm (4.13-to-0.79 in).

Conventional artillery as a vessel's battery has been largely displaced by guided missiles for both offensive and defensive actions. Small caliber guns are retained for niche roles, such as the multi-barrel Phalanx CIWS rotary cannon used for point defense. The rapid fire 5"/54 caliber Mark 45 gun 5-inch (130 mm) and Otobreda 76 mm (3.0 in) used for close defense against surface combatants and shore bombardment are among the last traditional naval guns still in use.

== Modern battery organization ==
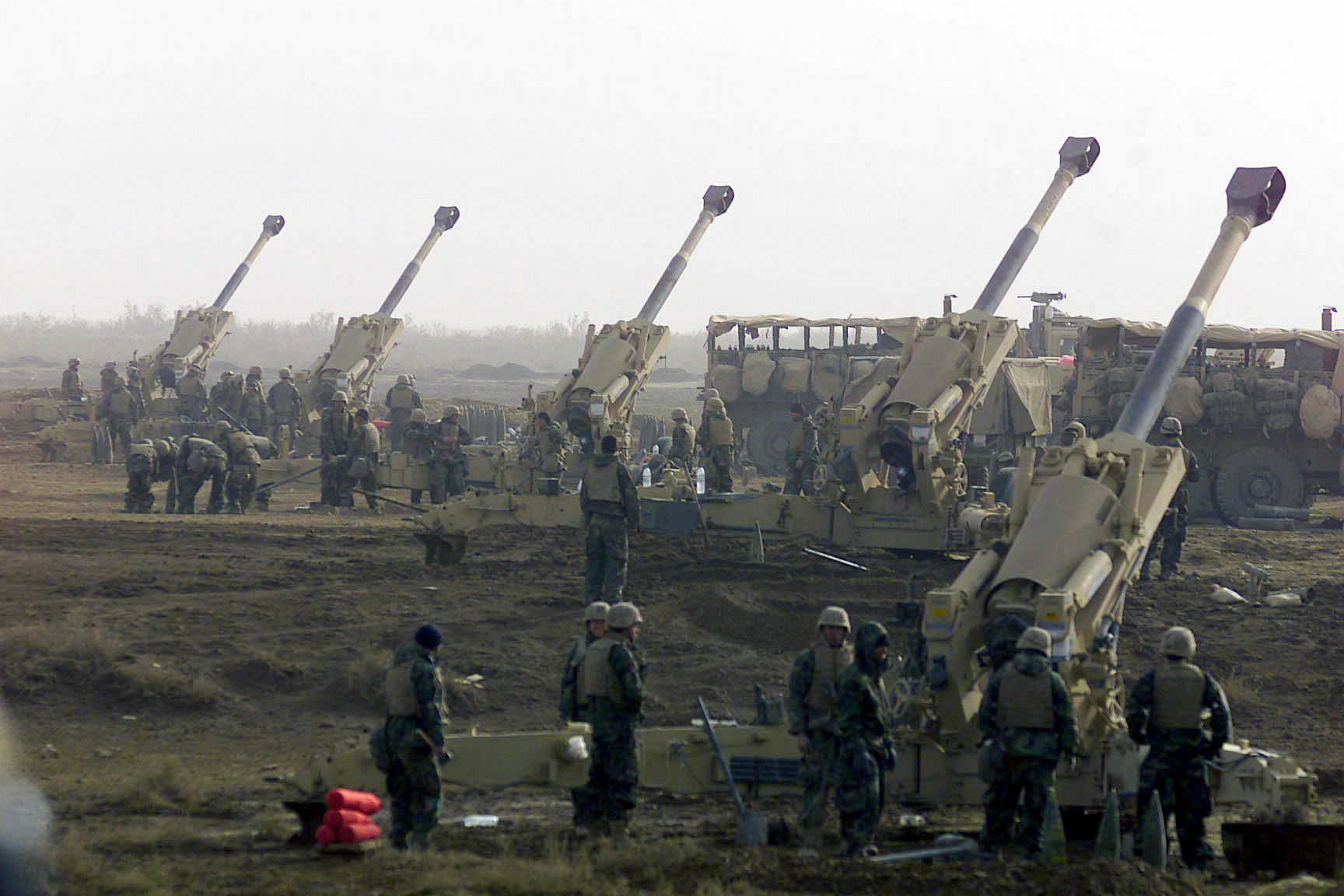
I Battery, 2nd Battalion 11th Marines in Iraq, 2003

In modern battery organization, the military unit typically has six to eight howitzers or six to nine rocket launchers and 100 to 200 personnel and is the equivalent of a company in terms of organisation level.

In the United States Army, generally a towed howitzer battery has six guns, whereas a self-propelled battery (such as an M109 battery) contains eight. They are subdivided into:

- Light batteries, equipped with 105 mm howitzers or equivalent;
- Medium batteries, equipped with 155 mm howitzers or equivalent;
- Heavy batteries, which are equipped with guns of 203 mm or larger calibre, but are now very rare; and
- Various more specialized types, such as anti-aircraft, missile, or Multiple Launch Rocket System batteries.
- Headquarters batteries, which themselves have no artillery pieces, but are rather the command and control organization for a group of firing batteries (for example, a regimental or battalion headquarters battery).

The battery is typically commanded by a captain in US forces and is equivalent to an infantry company. A US Army battery is divided into the following units:

- The firing section, which includes the individual gun sections. Each gun section is typically led by a staff sergeant (US Army Enlisted pay grade E-6); the firing section as a whole is usually led by a lieutenant and a senior NCO.
- The fire direction center (FDC), which computes firing solutions based on map coordinates, receives fire requests and feedback from observers and infantry units, and communicates directions to the firing section. It also receives commands from higher headquarters (i.e. the battalion FDC sends commands to the FDCs of all three of its batteries for the purpose of synchronizing a barrage).

Other armies can be significantly different, however. For example:

The United Kingdom and Commonwealth forces have classified batteries according to the caliber of the guns. Typically:

- Light batteries, equipped with 105 mm howitzers or smaller
- Medium batteries, equipped with larger calibres, up to 155 mm howitzers or equivalent
- Heavy batteries, with larger calibres
- Various more specialised types, such as anti-aircraft, missile, or Multiple Launch Rocket System batteries

Headquarters batteries, which themselves have no artillery pieces, but are rather the command and control organization for a group of firing batteries (for example, a regimental or battalion headquarters battery).

The basic field organization being the "gun group" and the "tactical group". The former being reconnaissance and survey, guns, command posts, logistic and equipment support elements, the latter being the battery commander and observation teams that deploy with the supported arm. In these armies the guns may be split into several fire units, which may deploy dispersed over an extended area or be concentrated into a single position. In some cases batteries have operationally deployed as six totally separate guns, although sections (pairs) are more usual.

A battery commander, or "BC" is a Major (like his infantry company commander counterpart). However, in these armies the battery commander leads the "tactical group" and is usually located with the headquarters of the infantry or armoured unit the battery is supporting. Increasingly these direct support battery commanders are responsible for the orchestration of all forms of fire support (mortars, attack helicopters, other aircraft and naval gunfire) as well as artillery. General support battery commanders are likely to be at brigade or higher headquarters.

The gun group is commanded by the Battery Captain (BK), the battery's second-in-command. However this position has no technical responsibilities, its primary concern is administration, including ammunition supply, local defence and is based in the "wagon-lines" a short distance from the actual gun position, where the gun towing and logistic vehicles are concealed. Technical control is by the Gun Position Officer (GPO, a lieutenant) who is also the reconnaissance officer. The battery has two Command Posts (CP), one active and one alternate, the latter provides back-up in the event of casualties, but primarily moves with the preparation party to the next gun position and becomes the main CP there. Each CP is controlled by a Command Post Officer (CPO) who is usually a Lieutenant, 2nd Lieutenant or Warrant Officer Class 2. Gun positions may be "tight", perhaps 150 m × 150 m (490 ft × 490 ft) when the counter battery threat is low, or gun manoeuver areas, where pairs of self-propelled guns move around a far larger area, if the counter-battery threat is high.

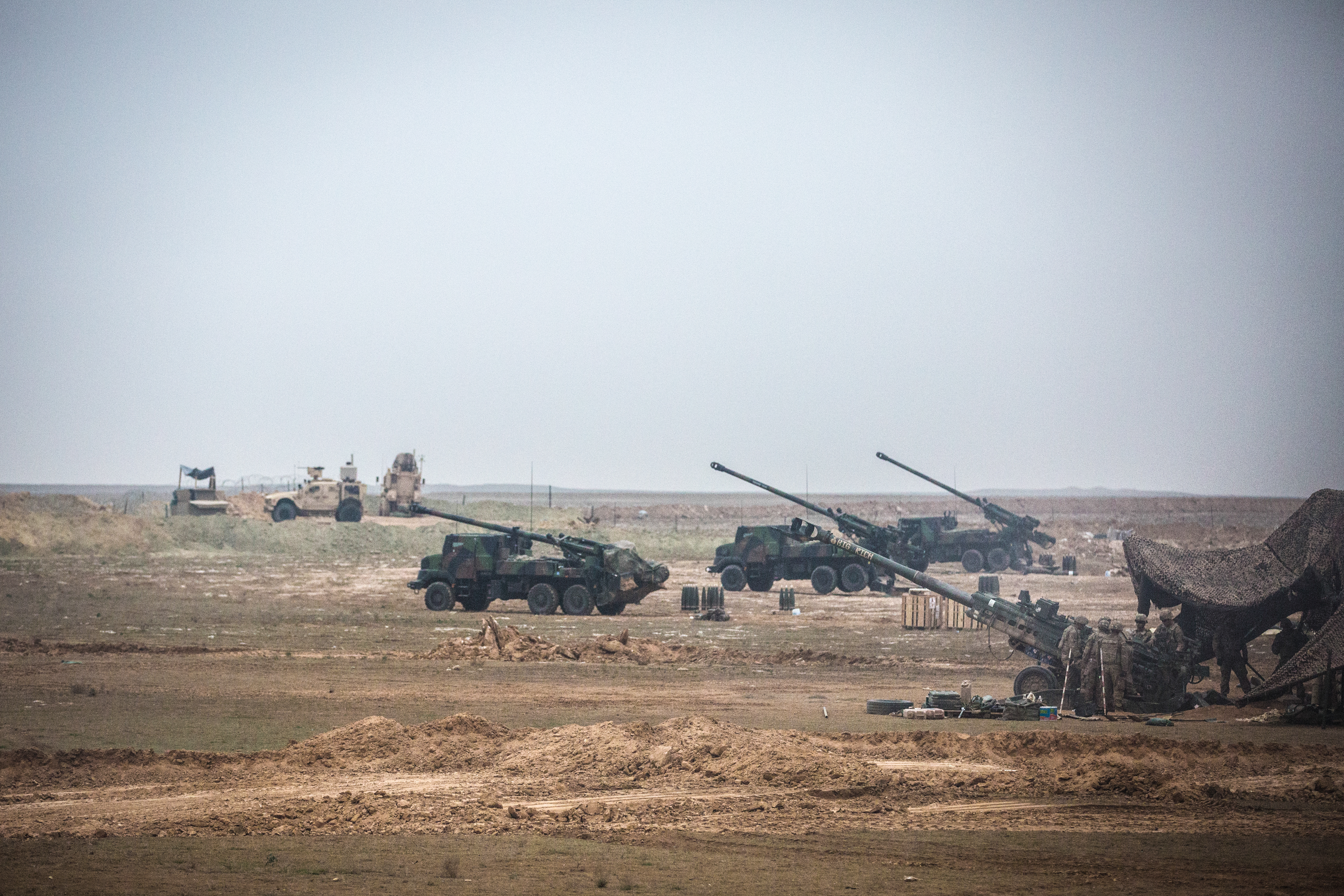
A joint Iraqi, French, and U.S. artillery battery in al-Qa'im, Iraq, 2 December 2018

During the Cold War NATO batteries that were dedicated to a nuclear role generally operated as "sections" comprising a single gun or launcher.

Groupings of mortars, when they are not operated by artillery, are usually referred to as platoons.

=== United States Marine Corps ===
155mm Howitzer Battery, Artillery Battalion, Artillery Regiment, Marine Division, Fleet Marine Force

(Battery Organization consisting of 147 Marines and Navy personnel, per Table of Organization T/O 1113G)

- Battery Headquarters
  - Headquarters Section – Battery CO (Capt), Battery 1stSgt, plus 3 Marines
  - Communications Section –16 Marines, led by the Radio Chief (SSGT)
  - Maintenance Section – 11 Marines, led by the Battery Motor Transport Chief (GySgt)
  - Medical Section – 3 Navy Hospital Corpsmen
  - Liaison Section – led by the Liaison Officer (1stLt)
    - Liaison Team – 5 Marines, led by the Observer Liaison Chief (SGT)
    - Forward Observer Team (3) – 4 Marines, led by a Forward Observer (2ndLT)
- Firing Platoon
  - Ammunition Section – 17 Marines, led by the Ammunition Chief (SSGT)
  - Headquarters Section – Platoon Commander/Battery XO (1stLt), Battery Gunnery Sergeant (GySgt), and Local Security Chief/Platoon Sergeant (SSGT)
    - Battery Operations Center – 5 Marines, led by the Assistant XO/FDO (2ndLt) and an Operations Assistant (SGT)
    - Fire Direction Center – 9 Marines, led by the Fire Direction Officer (FDO) (1stLT) and the Operations Chief (SSGT)
  - Artillery Section (6) – 10 Marines, led by the Section Chief (SSGT), with a Gunner (SGT), two Assistant Gunners (CPL), five Cannoneers (PVT-LCPL), and a Motor Vehicle Operator (LCPL) to operate and maintain the prime mover (i.e., truck used to tow the artillery piece and transport the gun crew and baggage).

Other armies can be significantly different, however. For example: the basic field organization being the "gun group" and the "tactical group". The former being reconnaissance and survey, guns, command posts, logistic, and equipment support elements, the latter being the battery commander and observation teams that deploy with the supported arm. In these armies the guns may be split into several fire units, which may deploy dispersed over an extended area or be concentrated into a single position. It some cases batteries have operationally deployed as six totally separate guns, although sections (pairs) are more usual.

== See also ==
- Field artillery (United States)
