= Helen's Bay =

Village in County Down, Northern Ireland

Coordinates: 54.670°N 5.735°W

Helen's Bay: Irish: Cuan Héilin
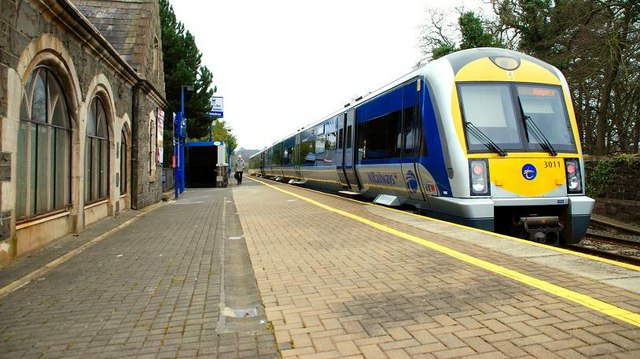
- Helen's Bay railway station

- Location within County Down
- Population: 1,547 (2021 census)
  - Belfast: 9 mi (14.5 km)
- District: Ards and North Down Borough
- County: County Down
- Country: Northern Ireland
- Sovereign state: United Kingdom
- Post town: BANGOR
- Postcode district: BT19
- Dialling code: 028
- UK Parliament: North Down
- NI Assembly: North Down

Helen's Bay is a village on the northern coast of County Down, Northern Ireland. It is within the townland of Ballygrot (from Irish Baile gCrot 'settlement of hillocks'), between Holywood, Crawfordsburn and Bangor. The village is served by a railway station and had a population of 1,547 in the 2021 census. It is part of the Ards and North Down Borough Council area.

== History ==
The village is named after Helen Blackwood, Baroness Dufferin and Claneboye (née Sheridan), who owned Clandeboye Estate and was the mother of Frederick Hamilton-Temple-Blackwood, 1st Marquess of Dufferin and Ava.

== Places of interest ==
Crawfordsburn Country Park, on the southern shores of Belfast Lough, features 3.5 km (2 mi) of coastline and a small beach. The Park also includes Grey Point Fort, a coastal battery and gun emplacement dating from 1904 and updated during World War II. It now houses a military museum. Helen's Bay Golf Club is located within the village and has a 9-hole course. Chef Michael Deane previously owned a restaurant in the village.

Helen's Bay Beach is popular for bathing during the Summer months. It has also been awarded the Green Coast Award.

Gray Point Fort, constructed in 1907, was the headquarters for the coastal defence of Northern Ireland during the Second World War. The fort was designed to protect Belfast from naval attacks but was not that effective during the Belfast Blitz. The fort was decommissioned in 1956.

== 2011 census ==
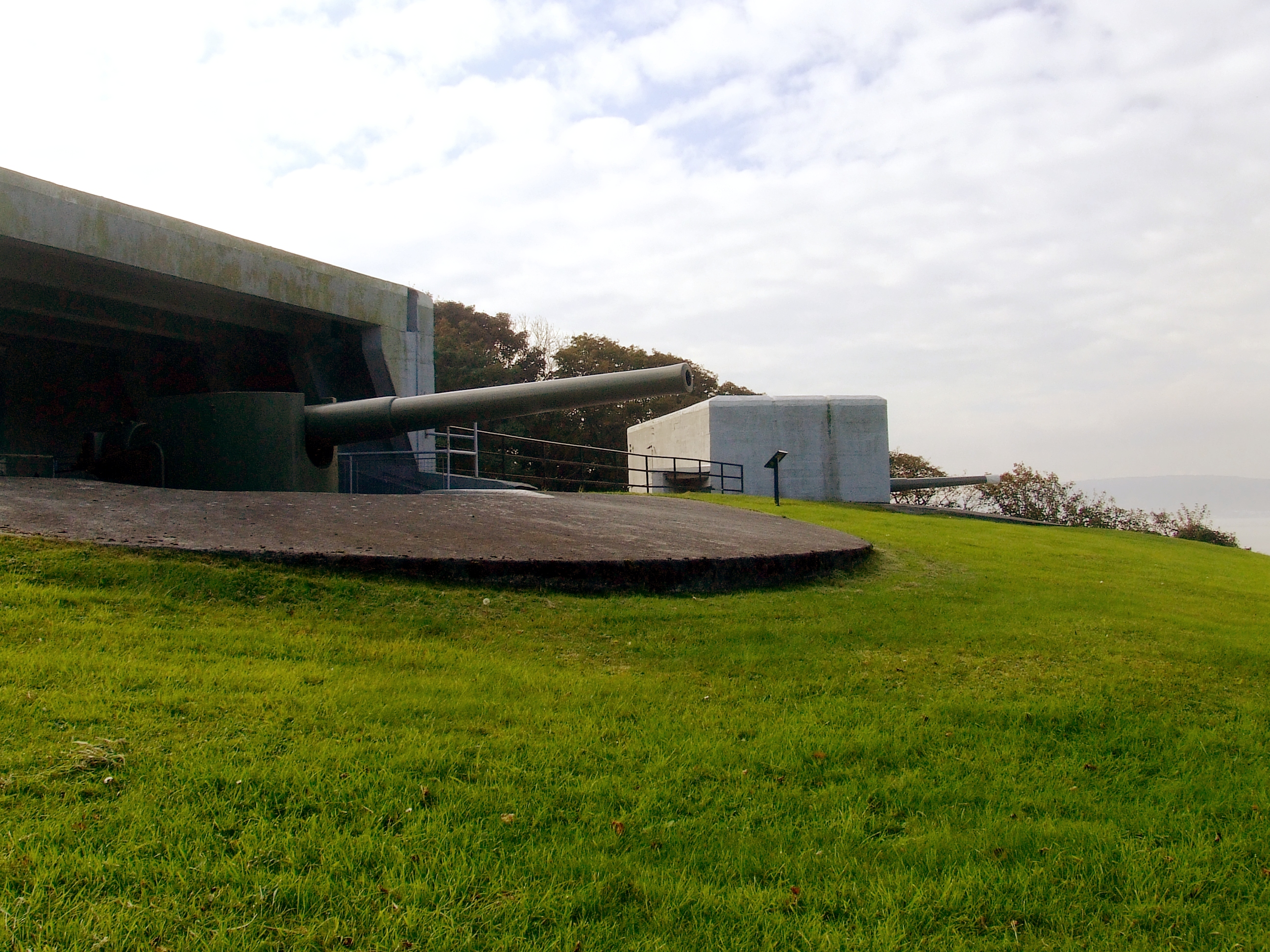
Grey Point Fort.

Helen's Bay is classified by the Northern Ireland Statistics and Research Agency (NISRA) as being within Belfast Metropolitan Urban Area (BMUA). On Census day (29 April 2001) there were 1,362 people living in Helen's Bay. Of these:

- 20.1% were aged under 17 years and 27.6% were aged 65 and over
- 47.9% of the population were male and 52.1% were female
- 65.8% identified as Protestant, 22.2% as non-religious and 10.9% as Roman Catholic specifically.
- 1.0% of people aged 16–74 were unemployed.

== People ==
- Brian Faulkner, (1921–1977), sixth and last Prime Minister of Northern Ireland, was born in Helen's Bay.
- Swimmer Andrew Bree is from Helen's Bay.
- Local celebrity chef Michael Deane won his 1st Michelin star at Deane's on the Square restaurant. This was only the second Michelin star to be awarded in Northern Ireland.

== Climate ==
Climate data for Helens Bay, elevation: 43 m (141 ft), 1991–2020 normals, extremes 1961–present
Month	Jan	Feb	Mar	Apr	May	Jun	Jul	Aug	Sep	Oct	Nov	Dec	Year
Record high °C (°F)	14.4 (57.9)	17.0 (62.6)	20.0 (68.0)	21.2 (70.2)	26.0 (78.8)	28.8 (83.8)	28.7 (83.7)	27.6 (81.7)	24.2 (75.6)	21.1 (70.0)	17.3 (63.1)	14.9 (58.8)	28.8 (83.8)
Mean daily maximum °C (°F)	7.7 (45.9)	8.5 (47.3)	10.3 (50.5)	12.7 (54.9)	15.6 (60.1)	18.0 (64.4)	19.6 (67.3)	19.4 (66.9)	17.3 (63.1)	13.8 (56.8)	10.2 (50.4)	8.1 (46.6)	13.5 (56.3)
Daily mean °C (°F)	5.4 (41.7)	5.7 (42.3)	7.0 (44.6)	8.9 (48.0)	11.4 (52.5)	13.9 (57.0)	15.5 (59.9)	15.5 (59.9)	13.8 (56.8)	10.8 (51.4)	7.7 (45.9)	5.8 (42.4)	10.1 (50.2)
Mean daily minimum °C (°F)	3.0 (37.4)	2.9 (37.2)	3.7 (38.7)	5.2 (41.4)	7.2 (45.0)	9.8 (49.6)	11.5 (52.7)	11.6 (52.9)	10.2 (50.4)	7.9 (46.2)	5.3 (41.5)	3.5 (38.3)	6.8 (44.2)
Record low °C (°F)	−4.9 (23.2)	−5.0 (23.0)	−5.0 (23.0)	−2.3 (27.9)	−1.1 (30.0)	2.1 (35.8)	5.0 (41.0)	4.8 (40.6)	1.6 (34.9)	0.0 (32.0)	−2.4 (27.7)	−6.2 (20.8)	−6.2 (20.8)
Average precipitation mm (inches)	92.5 (3.64)	74.7 (2.94)	72.0 (2.83)	61.6 (2.43)	63.4 (2.50)	71.5 (2.81)	76.7 (3.02)	82.8 (3.26)	72.1 (2.84)	97.8 (3.85)	103.4 (4.07)	99.1 (3.90)	967.7 (38.10)
Average precipitation days (≥ 1.0 mm)	14.7	12.5	12.3	11.3	11.9	11.3	12.9	13.2	11.4	13.3	15.4	14.8	155.1
Mean monthly sunshine hours	49.1	76.8	112.4	162.4	201.7	171.3	157.5	157.2	124.9	95.9	62.6	42.7	1,414.4
Source 1: Met Office
Source 2: Starlings Roost Weather

== Transport ==
- Helen's Bay railway station opened on 1 May 1865 and was closed for goods traffic on 24 April 1950. Helen's Bay is on the Belfast–Bangor railway line with train services provided by Northern Ireland Railways.

== Telephone Exchange ==
Although small, Helen's Bay still has its own BT Telephone exchange. Local numbers exist in the following formats:

- (028) 9185 2XXX
- (028) 9185 3XXX
- (028) 9185 4XXX

== See also ==
- List of towns and villages in Northern Ireland
