= Crawfordsburn railway station =

Railway station in Northern Ireland

Coordinates: 54.6637°N 5.7216°W

Crawfordsburn
- Train at Crawfordsburn station (1983)

General information
- Location: Crawfordsburn, North Down; Northern Ireland

Other information
- Status: Disused

History
- Post-grouping: Northern Ireland Railways

Key dates
- 1965: Opened
- 1997: Closed
Location

Crawfordsburn railway station served Crawfordsburn Hospital (which closed in the early 1990s) and Crawfordsburn Country Park in County Down, Northern Ireland. It was situated between Carnalea and Helen's Bay. The halt closed in 1997 because of low passenger numbers. The platforms were removed in 2001 during the relaying of the Belfast-Bangor railway line.

Preceding station	NI Railways	Following station
Helen's Bay	Northern Ireland Railways; Belfast-Bangor	Carnalea
