= Seahill railway station =

Railway station in County Down, Northern Ireland

Seahill
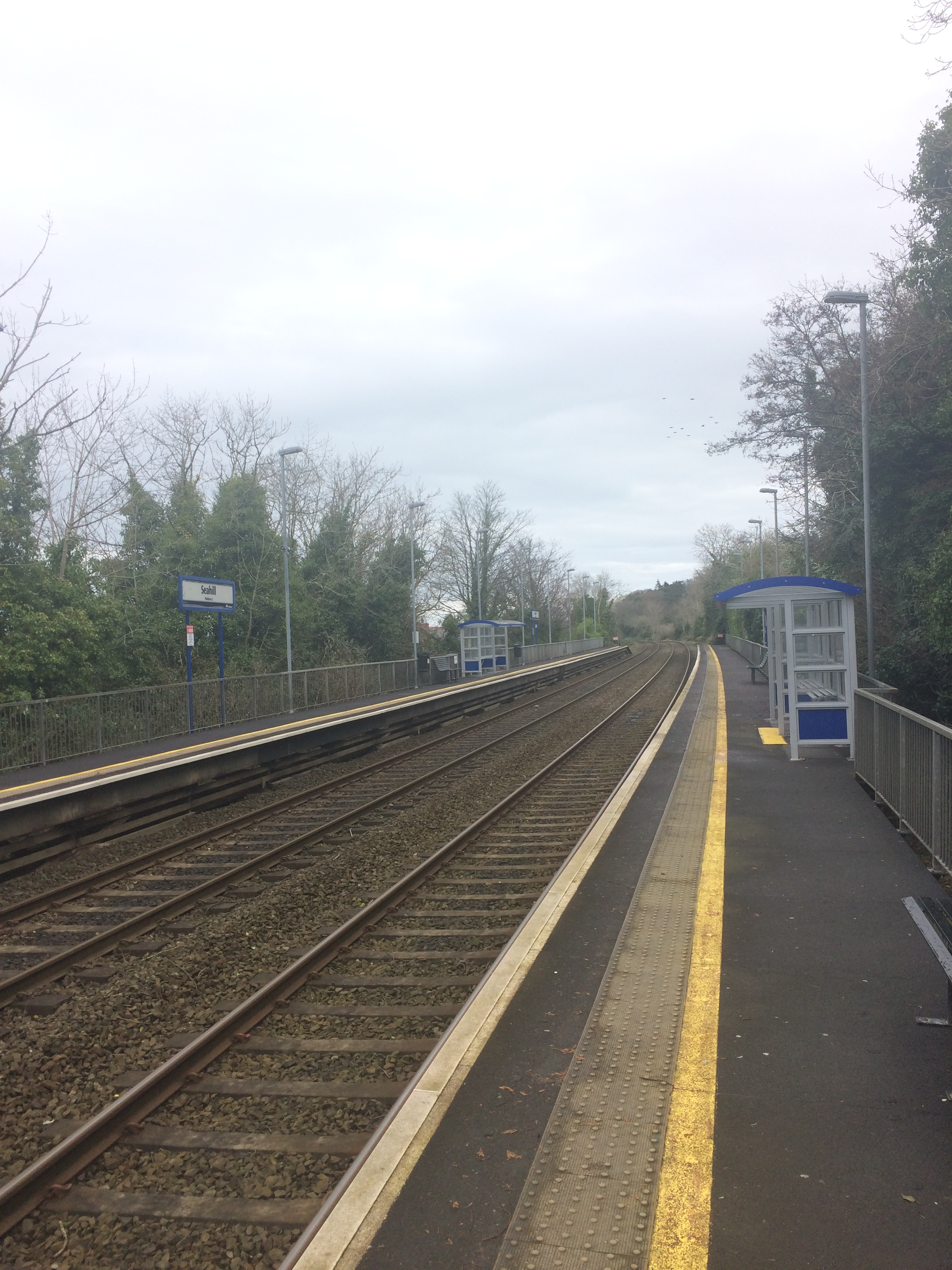
- Seahill Railway Station in 2017

General information
- Location: Seahill, Holywood; Northern Ireland
- Coordinates: 54.6609°N 5.7680°W
- Owner: NI Railways
- Operator: NI Railways
- Line: Bangor
- Platforms: 2
- Tracks: 2

Construction
- Structure type: At-grade

Other information
- Station code: SL

Key dates
- 1966: Station opened
- 2008: Station refurbished

Passengers
- 2022/23: 77,606
- 2023/24: ▲112,205
- 2024/25: ▲118,613
- 2025/26: ▼114,324
- NI Railways; Translink; NI railway stations
Route map
(Click to expand)
Location
- Location within Northern Ireland Location within island of Ireland

Seahill railway station is located in the townland of Ballyrobert in the Seahill area of Holywood, County Down, Northern Ireland. The station was opened on 4 April 1966.

== Service ==
Mondays to Saturdays there is a half hourly service towards Belfast Grand Central in one direction, and to Bangor in the other. Extra services operate at peak times, and the service reduces to hourly operation in the evenings, certain peak-time express trains will pass through Seahill station without stopping.

On Sundays there is an hourly service in each direction.

| Preceding station | NI Railways | Following station |
|---|---|---|
| Cultra | Northern Ireland Railways; Belfast–Bangor line | Helen's Bay |
