= English cannon =

Early form of ranged artillery

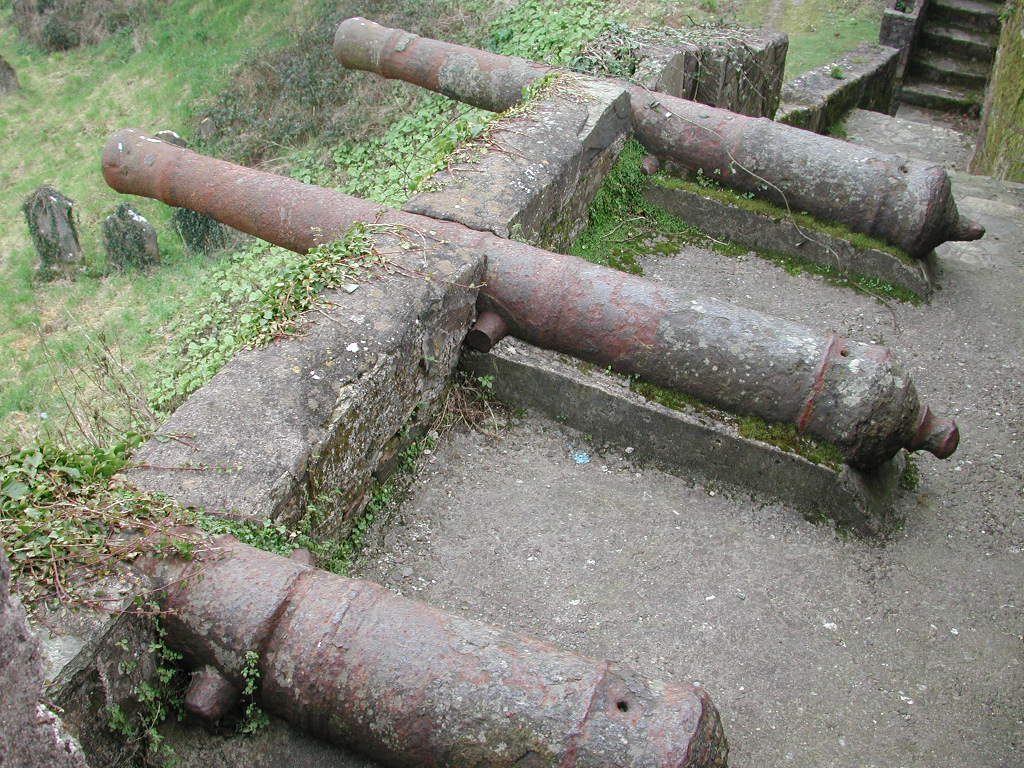
Remains of a battery of English cannon from Youghal

The first usage of cannon in Great Britain was possibly in 1327, when they were used in battle by the English against the Scots. Under the Tudors, the first forts featuring cannon batteries were built, while cannon were first used by the Tudor navy. Cannon were later used during the English Civil War for both siegework and extensively on the battlefield.

Cannon were first used abroad by the English during the Hundred Years War, when primitive artillery was used at the Battle of Crécy. With the Age of Discovery and the establishment of the Thirteen Colonies, cannon saw use in British armies in North America, first against the rival colony of New France, and later during the American Revolutionary War. From the 18th century to the present day, the Royal Regiment of Artillery has formed the artillery of the British Army. The Royal Navy developed the carronade in the 18th century, although they disappeared from use in the 1850s. As with other western cannon of the period, cannon used by the British Army and the Royal Navy became longer ranged and more destructive in the 19th and 20th centuries.

== History ==
=== Early development ===
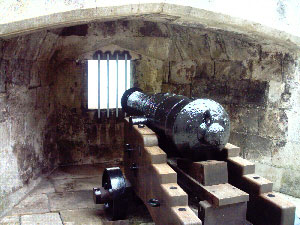
Portland Castle Cannon, with steps cut into the brackets. (Note: The steps were to aid elevation by providing purchase points for the hand-spikes.)

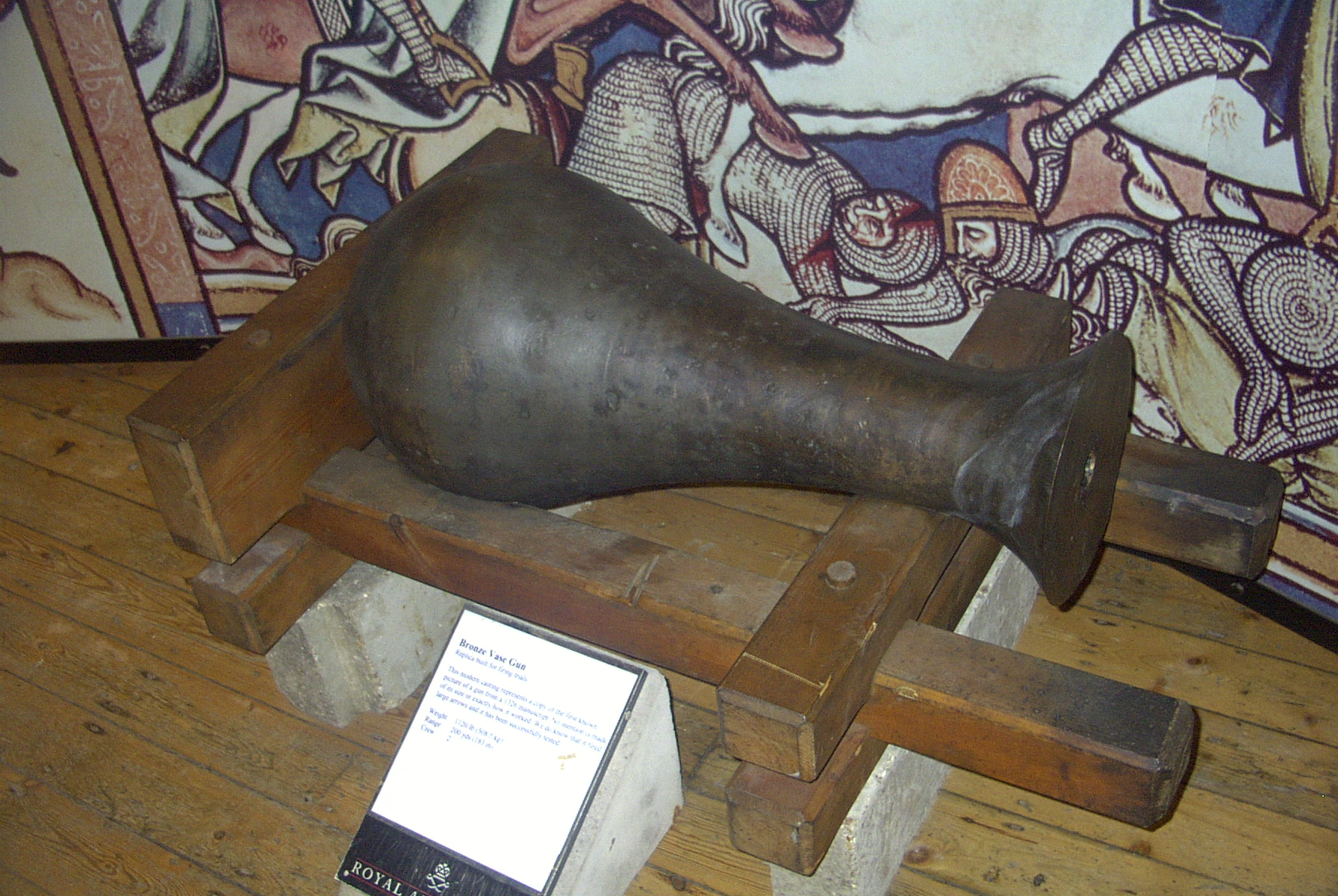
A reconstruction of the vase cannon that fired arrows.

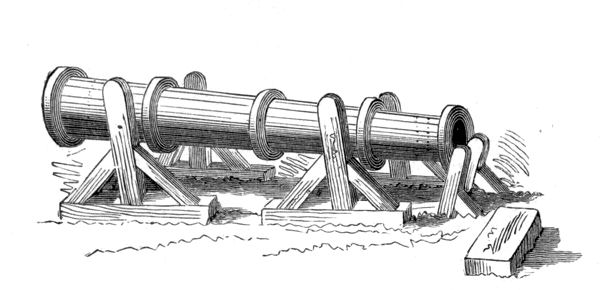
English cannon used at the Battle of Crécy.

English cannon saw its first use during the Hundred Years War, being used in small numbers during the 1340s. "Ribaldis" were first mentioned in the English Privy Wardrobe accounts during preparations for the Battle of Crécy between 1345 and 1346. These are believed to have shot large arrows and simplistic grapeshot, but they were so important they were directly controlled by the Royal Wardrobe. According to the contemporary poet Jean Froissart, the English cannon made "two or three discharges on the Genoese", which is taken to mean individual shots by two or three guns because of the time taken to reload such primitive artillery. Similar cannon appeared at the siege of Calais later the same year and by the 1380s, the "ribaudekin" had become mounted on wheels.

=== Tudor navy and the rise of the fort ===
Towards the end of the Middle Ages, the development of cannon made revolutionary changes to siege warfare throughout Europe, with many castles becoming susceptible to artillery fire. In England, significant changes were evident from the 16th century, when Henry VIII began building Device Forts between 1539 and 1540 as artillery fortresses to counter the threat of invasion from France and Spain. They were built by the state at strategic points to form the first powerful cannon batteries, but, though they had many of the same architectural facets as true castles, they served a purely military function (rather than serving as residences). Deal Castle remains one of the most impressive such Device Forts, and was perfectly symmetrical, with a low, circular keep at its centre. Over 200 cannon and gun ports were set within the walls, and the fort formed a firing platform with a shape that allowed many lines of fire. In addition, its low curved bastions were designed to deflect cannonballs. Cannon were now an inexorable part of English warfare.

Cannon also saw use in the Tudor navy (where a cannon was a "gun", and a cannonball a "shot"). The French "culverin" was adapted for naval use by the English in the late 16th century, and had a significant advantage over the ballista that had previously been used in naval warfare. This cannon was of relatively long barrel and light construction, and fired solid round shot projectiles at long ranges along a flat trajectory. One of the first ships to be able to fire a full cannon broadside was the English carrack the Mary Rose, built in Portsmouth from 1510–1512, and equipped with 78 guns (91 after an upgrade in the 1530s). It was one of the earliest purpose-built warships to serve in the English Navy (thought never to have served as a merchant ship), and her crew consisted of 200 sailors, 185 soldiers, and 30 gunners.

With the Age of Discovery, rivalry developed between European colonies and the importance of cannon in naval warfare increased. Many merchant vessels were armed with cannon and the aggressive activities of English privateers, who engaged the galleons of the Spanish treasure fleets, helped provoke the first Anglo-Spanish War, though it was not one of the main factors. A fleet review on Elizabeth I's accession in 1559 showed the navy to consist of 39 ships and in 1588, Philip II of Spain launched the Spanish Armada against England. In a running battle lasting over a week, the Armada was scattered and defeated by the English navy.

=== 17th century ===
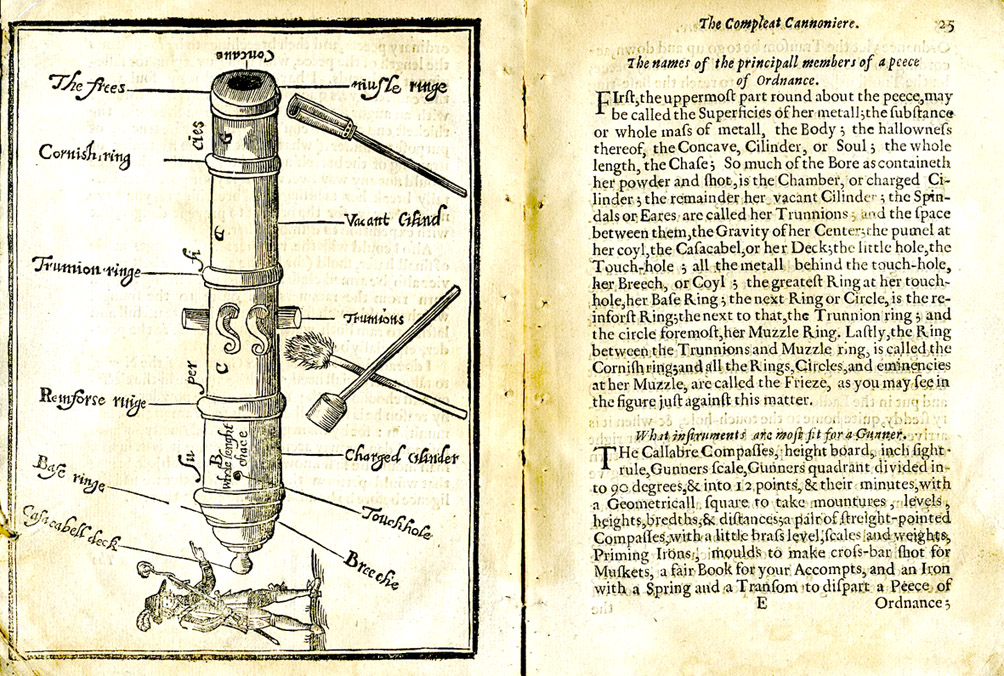
The parts of a cannon described, John Roberts, The Compleat Cannoniere, London 1652.

A description of the Gunner's art is given during the English Civil War period (mid-17th century) by John Roberts, covering the modes of calculation and the ordnance pieces themselves, in his work The Compleat Cannoniere, printed London 1652 by W. Wilson and sold by George Hurlock (Thames Street). The lower tier of English ships of the line at this time were usually equipped with demi-cannon – a naval gun which fired a 32-pound solid shot. A full cannon fired a 42-pound shot (and in fact there was a so-called "royal cannon" that fired a 60-pound shot), but these were discontinued by the 18th century as they were seen as too unwieldy.

With the establishment of the Thirteen Colonies, cannon saw use in English armies in the North American mainland, first against the rival colony of New France. However, although the French were outnumbered, their fortifications and artillery were superior to English cannon. When 34 ships from the English colony of Massachusetts bombarded Quebec in 1690, they were outmatched by the French batteries, which badly damaged the ships' hulls and struck off the colours of the English flagship. The English brass field guns landed on the shore were entirely ineffective against the militiamen in the woods, and a spontaneous retreat left five cannon abandoned on the shore. French victory showed that to take Quebec, the cannon of "Old England would have to be brought in".

=== 18th century ===
Before the 18th century, artillery "traynes" were raised by Royal Warrant for specific campaigns and disbanded again when they were over. On 26 May 1716, however, by Royal Warrant of George I, two regular companies of field artillery, each 100 men strong, were raised at Woolwich. On 1 April 1722 these companies were grouped with independent artillery companies at Gibraltar and Menorca to form the Royal Regiment of Artillery. The regiment expanded rapidly and by 1757 had 24 companies divided into two battalions, as well as a Cadet Company formed in 1741.

When Quebec was finally captured during the French and Indian War, the British had more cannon installed in the fortifications, and built more embrasures into the walls to maximise their effectiveness against siege batteries. When the French returned in 1760, the defenders had to leave all but two of their field guns in the retreat into the city. However, British cannon proved effective, as a heavy cannonade on the French batteries allowed them to hold out long enough for reinforcements.

By 1771, there were 32 companies of the Royal Artillery in four battalions, as well as two Invalid Companies comprising older and unfit men employed in garrison duties. In January 1793, two troops of Royal Horse Artillery (RHA) were raised to provide fire support for the cavalry, joined by two more in November 1793. All RHA personnel were mounted. The Royal Irish Artillery was absorbed in 1801.

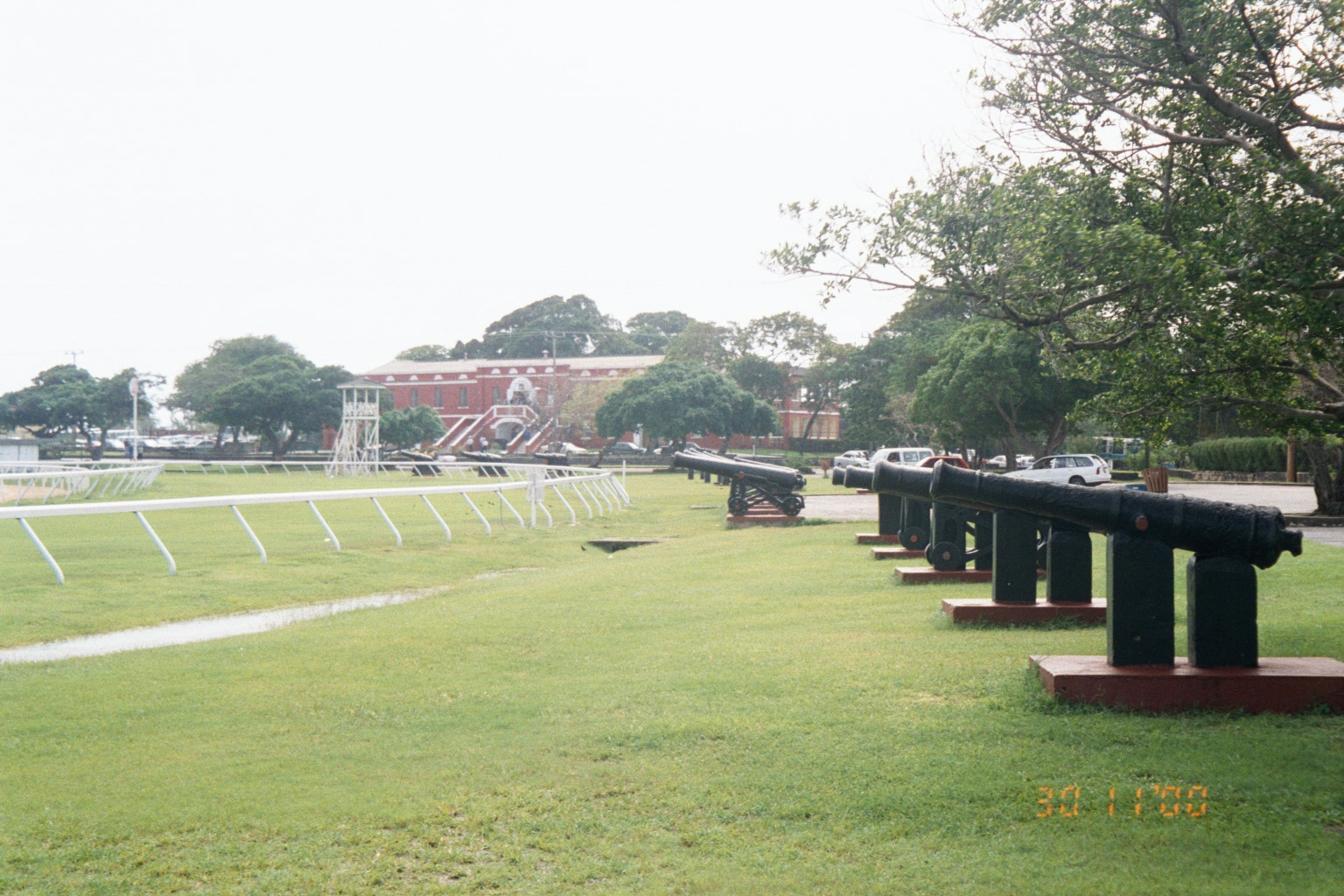
The Barbados National Cannon Collection at the St. Ann's Garrison Savannah.

Additionally, the carronade was adopted by the Royal Navy in 1779, and the lower muzzle velocity of the round shot was intended to create many more of the deadly wooden splinters when hitting the structure of an enemy vessel; these in fact were often the main cause of casualties. (Note: The slow velocity also resulted in a larger hole or dent.) It was much shorter and a third to a quarter of the weight of an equivalent long gun: for example, a 32-pounder carronade weighed less than a ton, but a 32-pounder long gun weighed over 3 tons. Carronades were manufactured in the usual naval gun calibres, but they were not counted in a ship of the line's rated number of guns. As a result, the classification of Royal Navy vessels in this period can mislead, since they would often be carrying more pieces of ordnance than they were described as carrying.

The carronade was initially very successful and widely adopted, although in the 1810s and 1820s, greater emphasis was placed on the accuracy of long-range gunfire, and less on the weight of a broadside. The small powder charge of the carronade was only able to project a heavy cannonball over a relatively limited distance. The short barrel, low muzzle velocity and short range also increased the risk that a carronade would eject burning wadding onto nearby combustible materials, increasing the risk of fire. The carronade disappeared from the Royal Navy from the 1850s after the development of steel, jacketed cannon by William George Armstrong and Joseph Whitworth.

== Operation ==
The 1771 Encyclopædia Britannica describes the operation of 18th-century British cannon. Each cannon would be manned by two gunners, six soldiers, and four artillery officers. The right gunner was to prime the piece and load it with powder, while the left gunner would fetch the powder from the magazine and keep ready to fire the cannon at the officer's command. Three soldiers stood on each side of the cannon, to ram and sponge the cannon, and hold the lantern and ladle. The second soldier on the left was charged with providing 50 bullets.

Prior to loading, the cannon would be well cleaned with a sponge to remove all sparks, filth, and dirt. The powder was added, followed by a wad of paper or hay, and the ball was thrown in. After ramming the cannon would be aimed with the elevation set using a quadrant and a plummet. At 45 degrees the ball had the utmost range – about ten times the gun's level range. Any angle above the horizontal line was called random-shot. The officer of artillery had to ensure the cannon was diligently served. Water was available to dip the sponges in and cool the pieces every ten or twelve rounds.

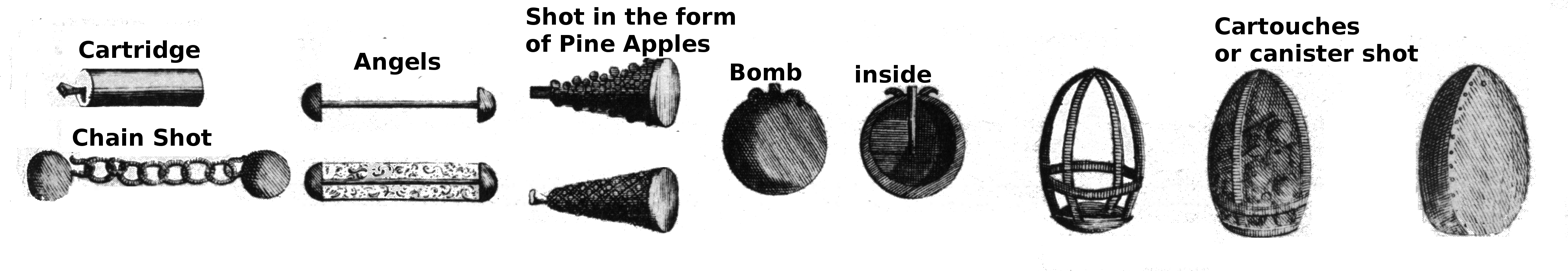
18th-century cannon bullets

In the late 1770s it was said that a 24-pounder could fire 90 to 100 shots a day in summer, or 60 to 75 in winter. A 16 or 12-pounder would fire a little more, because they were easier served. The Encyclopædia Britannica mentions "some occasions where 200 shots have been fired from these pieces in the space of nine hours, and 138 in the space of five."

The introduction of carronades at this time also resulted in guns that were easier to handle and required less than half the gunpowder of long guns, allowing fewer men to crew them than long guns mounted on naval garrison carriages.

During the Napoleonic Wars, a British gun team consisted of 5 numbered gunners – fewer crew than needed in the previous century. The No.1 was the gun commander, usually a sergeant, who aimed the gun. The No.2 was the "spongeman" who cleaned the bore with the sponge dampened with water between shots; the intention being to quench any remaining embers before a fresh charge was introduced. The No.3, the loader, inserted the bag of powder and then the projectile. The No.2 then used a rammer, or the sponge reversed, to drive it in. At the same time, the No.4 ("ventsman") pressed his thumb on the vent hole to prevent a draught that might fan a flame. The charge loaded, the No.4 pricked the bagged charge through the vent hole and filled the vent with powder. At the No.1's command the No.5 would fire the piece with his slowmatch.

== See also ==
- Naval artillery in the Age of Sail
- Royal Artillery
