= Helen's Bay railway station =

Railway station in Helen's Bay, Northern Ireland

Helen's Bay
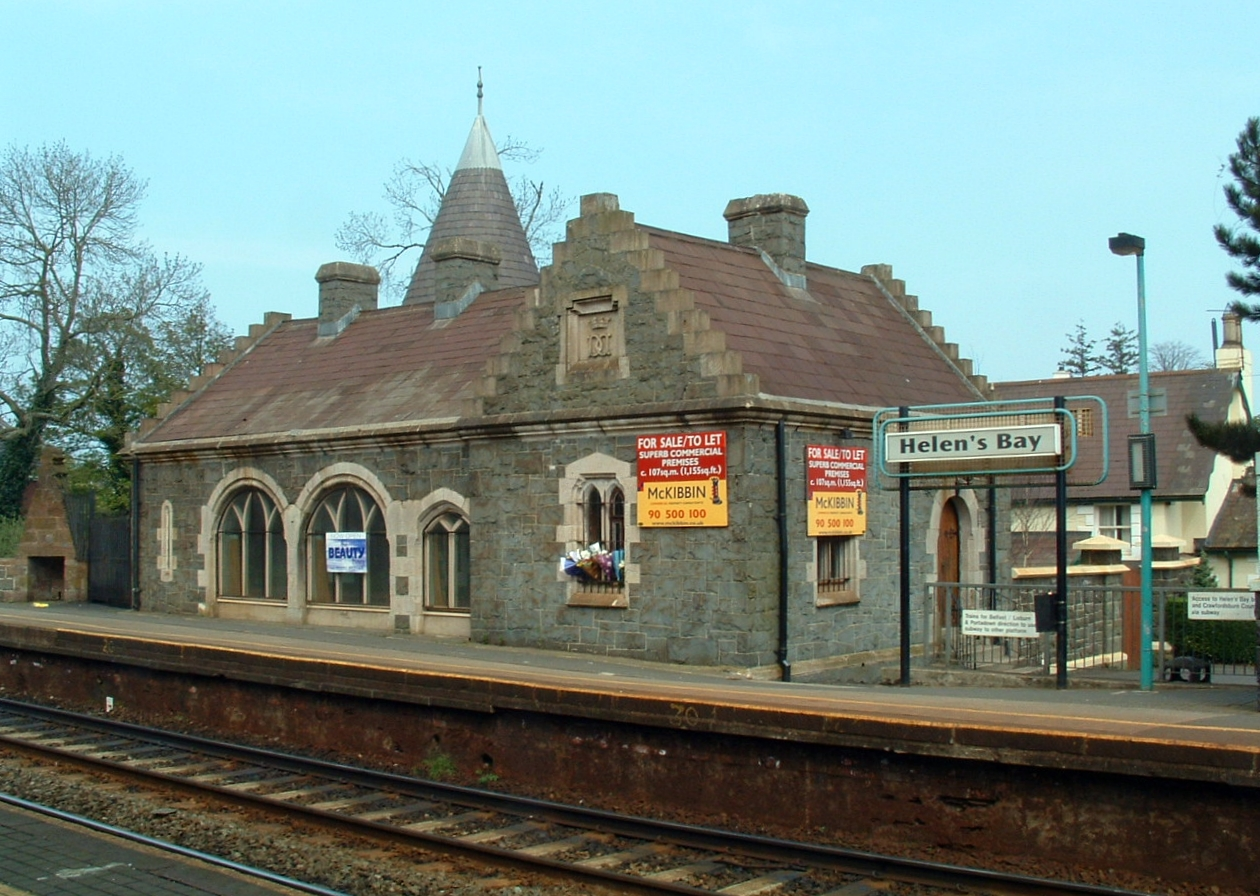
- Helen's Bay station in 2005

General information
- Location: Helen's Bay; Northern Ireland
- Coordinates: 54°39′59″N 5°44′27″W
- Owner: NI Railways
- Operator: NI Railways
- Line: Bangor
- Platforms: 2
- Tracks: 2

Construction
- Structure type: At-grade

Other information
- Station code: HB

Key dates
- 1865: Opened
- 1950: Goods traffic ceased
- 2008: Refurbished

Passengers
- 2022/23: 135,371
- 2023/24: ▲167,849
- 2024/25: ▼148,239
- 2025/26: ▲162,229
- NI Railways; Translink; NI railway stations
Route map
(Click to expand)
Location
- Location within Northern Ireland Location within island of Ireland

Helen's Bay railway station serves Helen's Bay as well as the nearby village of Crawfordsburn in the townland of Ballygrot, County Down, Northern Ireland.

== History ==
The station building was designed by Benjamin Ferrey in the Scottish Baronial style and dates from c. 1862. It was built on the estate of Lord Dufferin, who dictated the design of the station complex as a condition of allowing the railway to pass through his estate. The station included a private entrance for the Dufferin family.

The Holywood–Bangor section of the railway opened on 19 May 1865. The station was originally named Clandeboye, and was renamed Helen's Bay in 1885.

The next station on the line towards Bangor was formerly Crawfordsburn, which closed in 1997.

On 22 July 1922, two brothers who were well known in Helen's Bay were killed at the station while waiting for a train to Belfast. Their bodies were placed in the old station house.

In 2004, a 17-year-old was killed after falling beneath a moving train at the station.

In 2026, Translink completed a 35-metre extension of the Belfast-bound platform. The extension was constructed to accommodate increased passenger numbers during busy summer periods and to reduce overcrowding at the station. The main construction works were carried out during two weekend closures of the Belfast–Bangor line in February and March 2026.

== Service ==
Mondays to Saturdays, there is generally a half-hourly westbound service towards Titanic Quarter and Belfast Grand Central, and a half-hourly eastbound service towards Bangor West and Bangor. Additional services operate during peak periods, although some peak-time express services pass through Helen's Bay without stopping. Services are less frequent during the late evening.

On Sundays, there is generally an hourly service in each direction.

Preceding station	NI Railways	Following station
Seahill	Northern Ireland Railways; Belfast–Bangor Line	Carnalea

== Bibliography ==
- William Alan McCutcheon, The Industrial Archaeology of Northern Ireland, Department of the Environment for Northern Ireland, 1980
