= Crawfordsburn =

Village in County Down, Northern Ireland

Coordinates: 54°39′30″N 5°43′52″W

Crawfordsburn: Irish: Sruth Chráfard; Scots: Crawford's burn
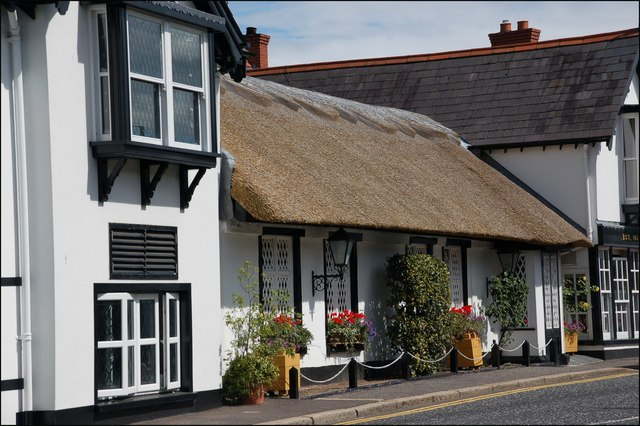
- The Old Inn, Crawfordsburn

- Location within County Down
- Population: 632 (2021 census)
- District: Ards and North Down Borough
- County: County Down
- Country: Northern Ireland
- Sovereign state: United Kingdom
- Post town: BANGOR
- Postcode district: BT19
- Dialling code: 028
- UK Parliament: North Down
- NI Assembly: North Down

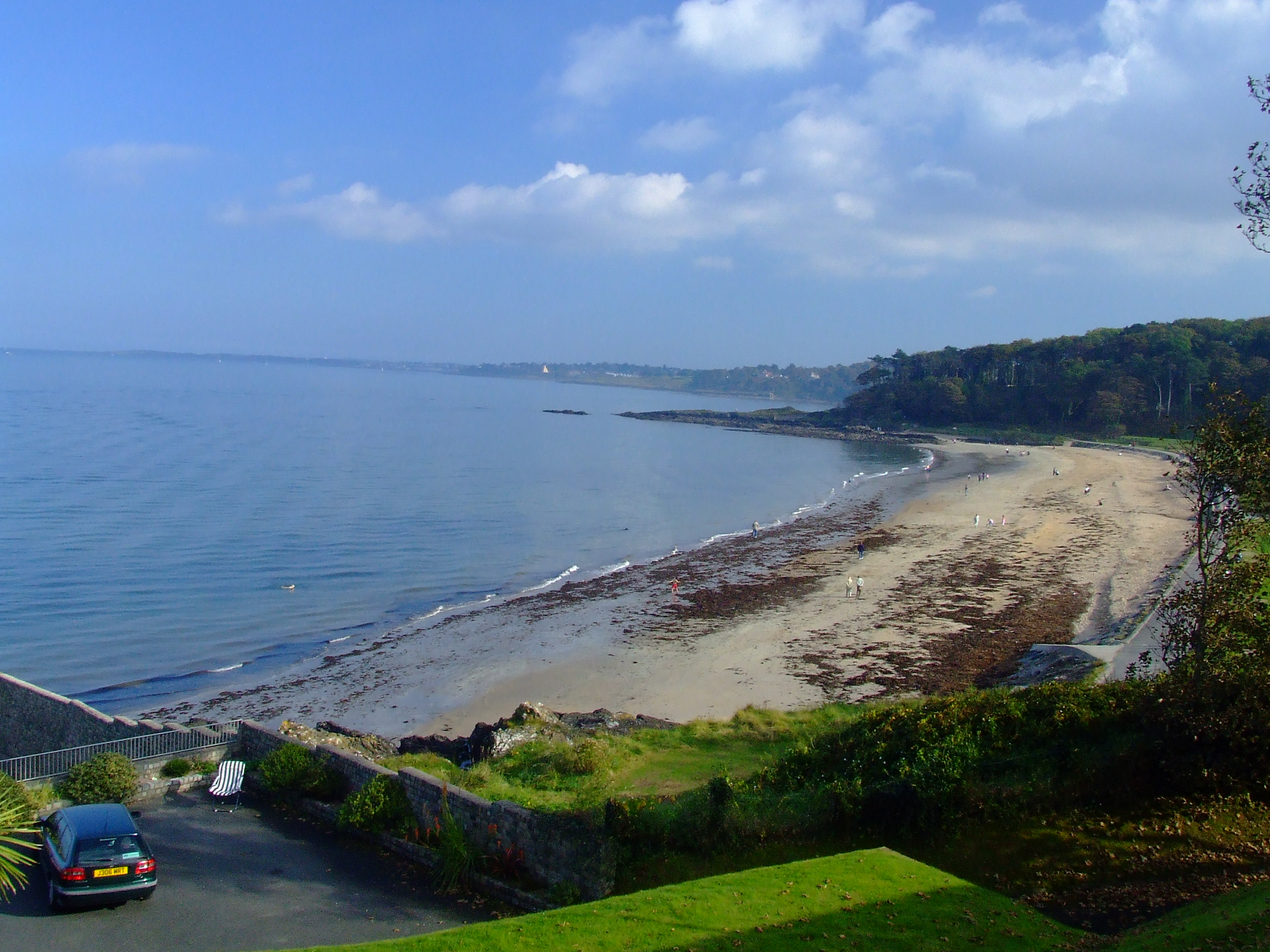
Crawfordsburn Country Park, 2007

Crawfordsburn (from Scots Crawford's burn 'Crawford's stream'), in an area historically Ballymullan (Irish: Baile Uí Mhaoláin), is a village in County Down, Northern Ireland. The village, which is now effectively a commuter town, lies between Holywood and Bangor to the north of the A2 road, about 4 km west of Bangor city centre. Bounded to the north and north east by Crawfordsburn Country Park, the village attracts many visitors. It had a population of 632 people in the 2021 census. the village is served by the nearby Helen's Bay railway station.

== History ==
Before the 17th-century Plantation of Ulster, the area was known as Ballymullan (Irish: Baile Uí Mhaoláin). Writing in An Historical Account of the Diocese of Down and Connor, Ancient and Modern, published in 1880, James O'Laverty suggests that the Crawford family of Ayrshire arrived in the area, as tenants of James Hamilton, 1st Viscount Claneboye, in the early 17th century. The area subsequently became known as Crawfordsburn, from the family name Crawford and 'burn' meaning stream.

The Old Inn in Crawfordsburn is a pub and hotel that has been in existence since the 17th century. Records show this building to have been standing in its present form since 1614. There is evidence that substantial additions were made in the middle of the 18th century. In the 17th and 18th centuries, Donaghadee was one of the principal cross-channel ports between Ireland and Great Britain. The mail coach making connections with the sailing packet, changed horses at the Old Inn at Crawfordsburn and so it came to be patronised by a number of notable people including Jonathan Swift, Alfred, Lord Tennyson, William Makepeace Thackeray, Charles Dickens and Anthony Trollope. It was also frequented by C. S. Lewis.

Crawfordsburn Orange Hall is a 19th century building in the village. It is used by its Orange Order owners, the Crawfordsburn Chosen Few LOL 1091, who originally met in the old school house from 1905 and then bought the current building. In addition to other local community groups, the hall is also used by Robert Whiteside Memorial LOL 1229 and Sir Henry Wilson RBP 1104.

Crawfordsburn Scout Activity Centre is adjacent to Crawfordsburn Country Park. The Scout centre consists of 22 acres (9 hectares) of camping ground including several accommodation buildings. Originally part of the Sharman estate, it opened for Scout camping in October 1948.

== Sport ==
Bryansburn Rangers F.C. are an intermediate football club founded in the nearby town of Bangor, however their home ground named Ballywooley is situated on the Crawfordsburn Road on the way into the village from Bangor.

== Demographics ==
Crawfordsburn is classified by the NI Statistics and Research Agency (NISRA) as being within Belfast Metropolitan Urban Area (BMUA). On census day in 2011 (27 March 2011), there were 587 people living in Crawfordsburn. Of these:

- 18.2% were aged under 17 years and 27.4% were aged 65 and over
- 48.5% of the population were male and 51.5% were female
- 65.6% identified as Protestant, 23.4% as non-religious and 10.1% as Roman Catholic specifically.
- 1.5% of people aged 16–74 were unemployed

== Notable people ==
- Samuel Hall-Thompson (1885–1954) was a Unionist politician born in Crawfordsburn.

== See also ==
- List of villages in Northern Ireland
- List of towns in Northern Ireland
- List of tourist attractions in Ireland
