= Seagoe railway station =

Former railway station in County Armagh, Northern Ireland

Seagoe
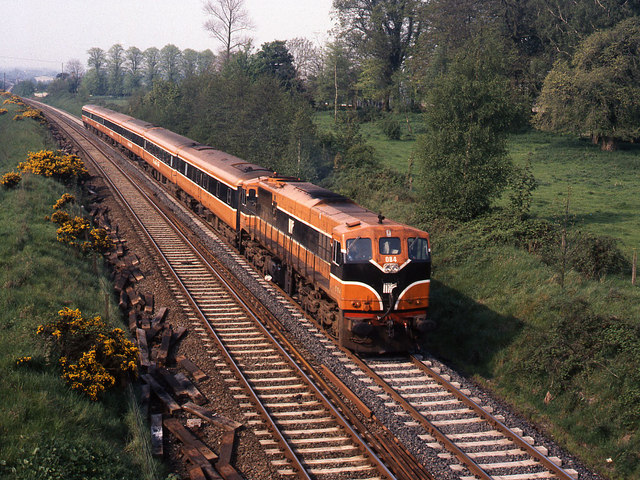
- An Iarnród Éireann 071 Class locomotive hauling a Dublin–Belfast passenger train towards the former site of Seagoe signal cabin

General information
- Location: Seagoe, Portadown; County Armagh; Northern Ireland
- Coordinates: 54.4393°N 6.4237°W
- Owner: Ulster Railway
- Platforms: 2

Construction
- Structure type: At-grade

Other information
- Status: Closed

History
- Original company: Ulster Railway

Key dates
- 31 January 1842: Opened as temporary terminus
- 12 September 1842: Closed following extension to Portadown

Other services
Preceding station	Historical railways	Following station
Terminus	Ulster Railway; Belfast–Seagoe	Lurgan
Route map
Location
- Location within Northern Ireland Location within island of Ireland

Seagoe Station was a station of Ireland's Ulster Railway which was opened on 31 January 1842 and closed on 12 September 1842 when the railway line was completed as far as Portadown and Portadown railway station was opened to passengers on 12 September 1842. The former station is on the mainline between Lurgan and Portadown on the Belfast-Dublin line, located in County Armagh, Northern Ireland.

== Gallery ==
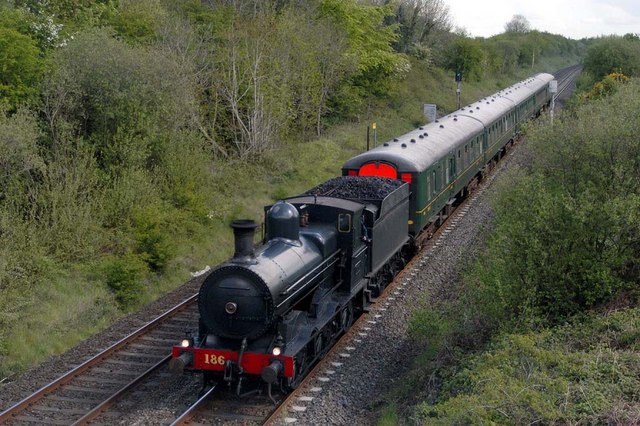
GSWR 186 passing near the site of Seagoe Station on a Railway Preservation Society of Ireland service.

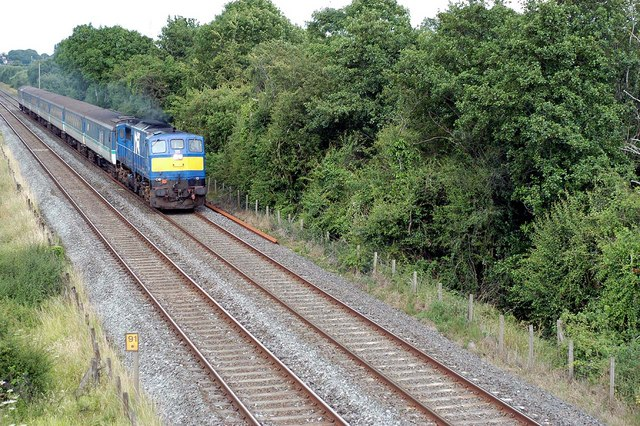
The ex-Gatwick Express rolling stock on the line at Goodyear near Seagoe.
