= Damhead railway station =

Railway station in Northern Ireland

Damhead
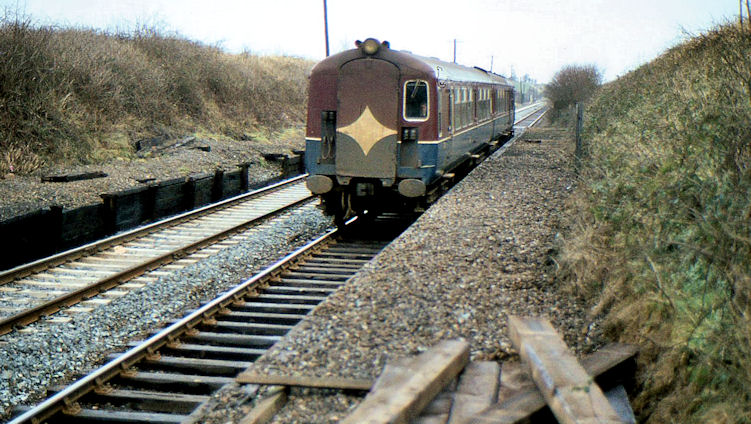
- NIR Class 80 train passing the remains of Damhead station in 1982

General information
- Other names: Damhead Halt
- Location: Maghaberry, County Antrim; Northern Ireland
- Coordinates: 54.497668°N 6.168854°W
- Line: Dublin–Belfast railway line
- Distance: 100 mi (160 km) from Dublin Amiens Street (historical mileage)
- Platforms: 2

History
- Original company: Great Northern Railway (Ireland)

Key dates
- 31 January 1935: Opened as Damhead Halt
- 1 October 1958: Transferred to the Ulster Transport Authority
- 1967: Transferred to NI Railways
- 2 July 1973: Closed

Historical railways
Preceding station	Historical railways	Following station
Moira; Line and station open	Great Northern Railway (Ireland); Belfast–Portadown (1935–1958)	Broomhedge Halt; Line open, station closed
Moira; Line and station open	Ulster Transport Authority; Belfast–Portadown (1958–1967)	Broomhedge Halt; Line open, station closed
Moira; Line and station open	NI Railways; Belfast–Portadown (1967–1973)	Broomhedge Halt; Line open, station closed
Route map
Location
- Location within Northern Ireland Location within island of Ireland

Damhead railway station, also known as Damhead Halt, was a railway halt near Maghaberry, County Antrim, Northern Ireland, on the Dublin–Belfast railway line. It opened on 31 January 1935 and closed on 2 July 1973.

== History ==
An earlier stopping place known as The Damhead existed on the Ulster Railway. It was a request stop that had closed by 1 January 1845.

The later Damhead Halt opened on 31 January 1935 under the Great Northern Railway (Ireland). It was located between Moira and Broomhedge Halt, at the 100-mile point measured from Dublin Amiens Street, now Dublin Connolly.

Following the dissolution of the Great Northern Railway Board on 1 October 1958, the halt passed to the Ulster Transport Authority. It subsequently became part of NI Railways when the company was formed in 1967.

The Irish Railway Stations Index records that Damhead Halt was used for excursion traffic after 28 June 1971. The halt officially closed to passengers on 2 July 1973.

== Gallery ==
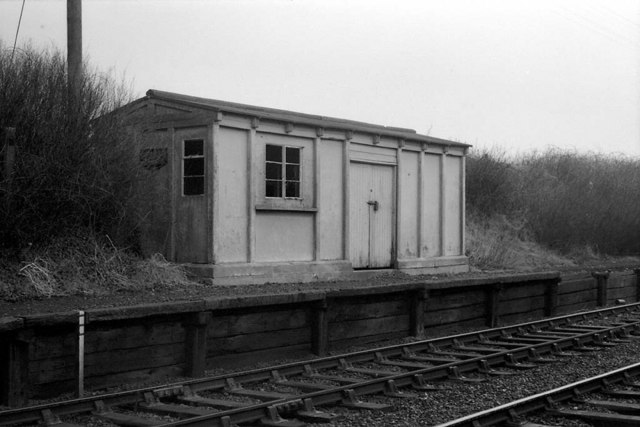
March 1979

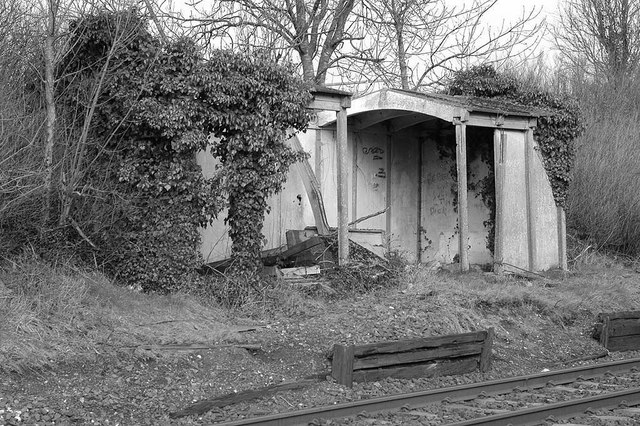
Damhead station building in 2006

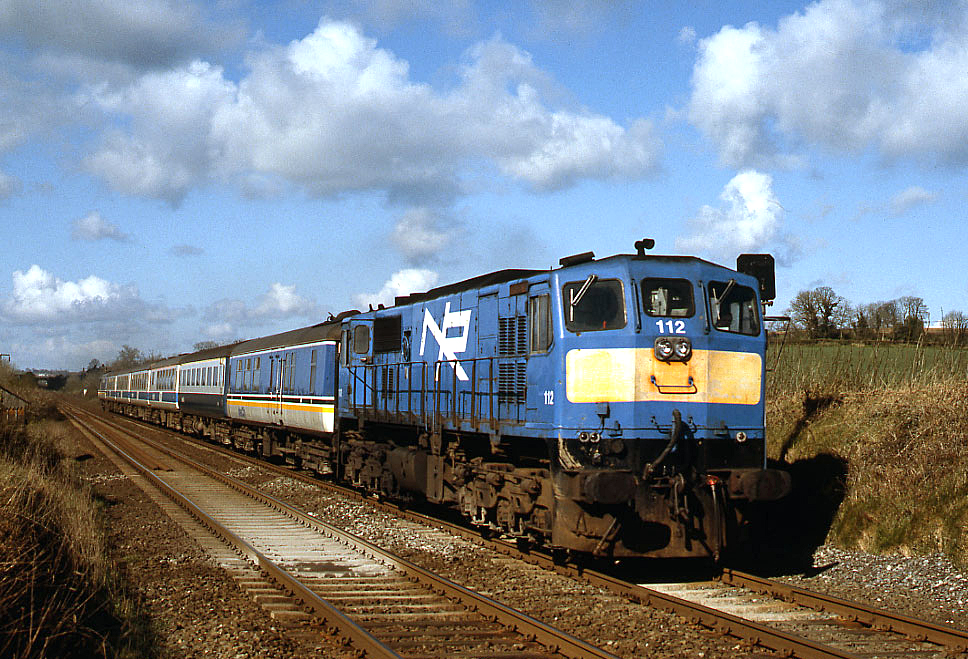
Northern Ireland Railways GM built 112 brings what should be the 08.00 passenger service from Dublin (Connolly) to Belfast (Central) towards the remains of Damhead station
