= Moira railway station =

Railway station in County Down, Northern Ireland

Moira
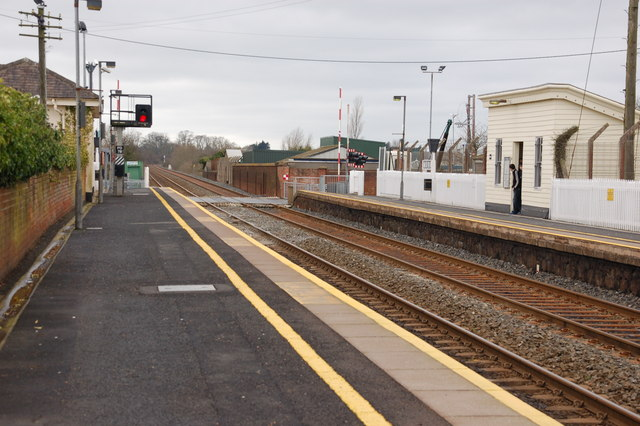

General information
- Location: Moira, County Down. (Station in County Antrim); Northern Ireland
- Coordinates: 54.492°N 6.215°W
- System: Park and Ride Commuter rail
- Owner: NI Railways
- Operator: NI Railways
- Line: Dublin–Belfast
- Platforms: 2
- Tracks: 2

Construction
- Structure type: At-grade

Other information
- Station code: NIR: MR; IÉ: MOIRA
- Fare zone: iLink Zone 3

History
- Opened: 1841

Passengers
- 2022/23: 254,953
- 2023/24: ▲330,930
- 2024/25: ▼280,972
- 2025/26: ▲337,475

Services
Preceding station	NI Railways	Following station
Lurgan towards Portadown or Newry	Portadown Line	Lisburn towards Belfast Grand Central

Historical railways
Preceding station	Historical railways	Following station
Pritchard's Bridge; Line open, station closed	Ulster Railway; Belfast–Portadown	The Damhead; Line open, station closed
Lurgan; Line and station open	Great Northern Railway (Ireland); Belfast–Portadown	Damhead; Line open, station closed
- NI Railways; Translink; NI railway stations
Route map
(Click to expand)
Location
- Location within Northern Ireland Location within island of Ireland

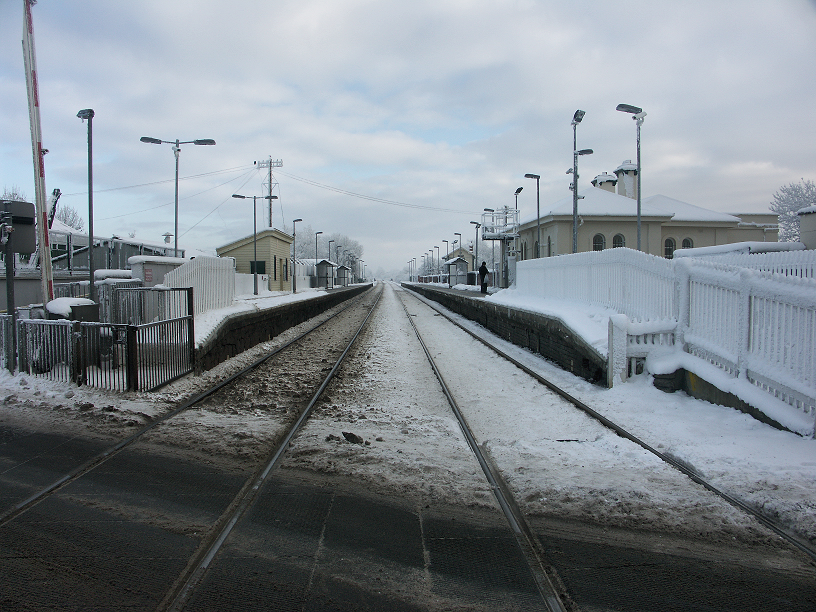
Moira station in the winter.

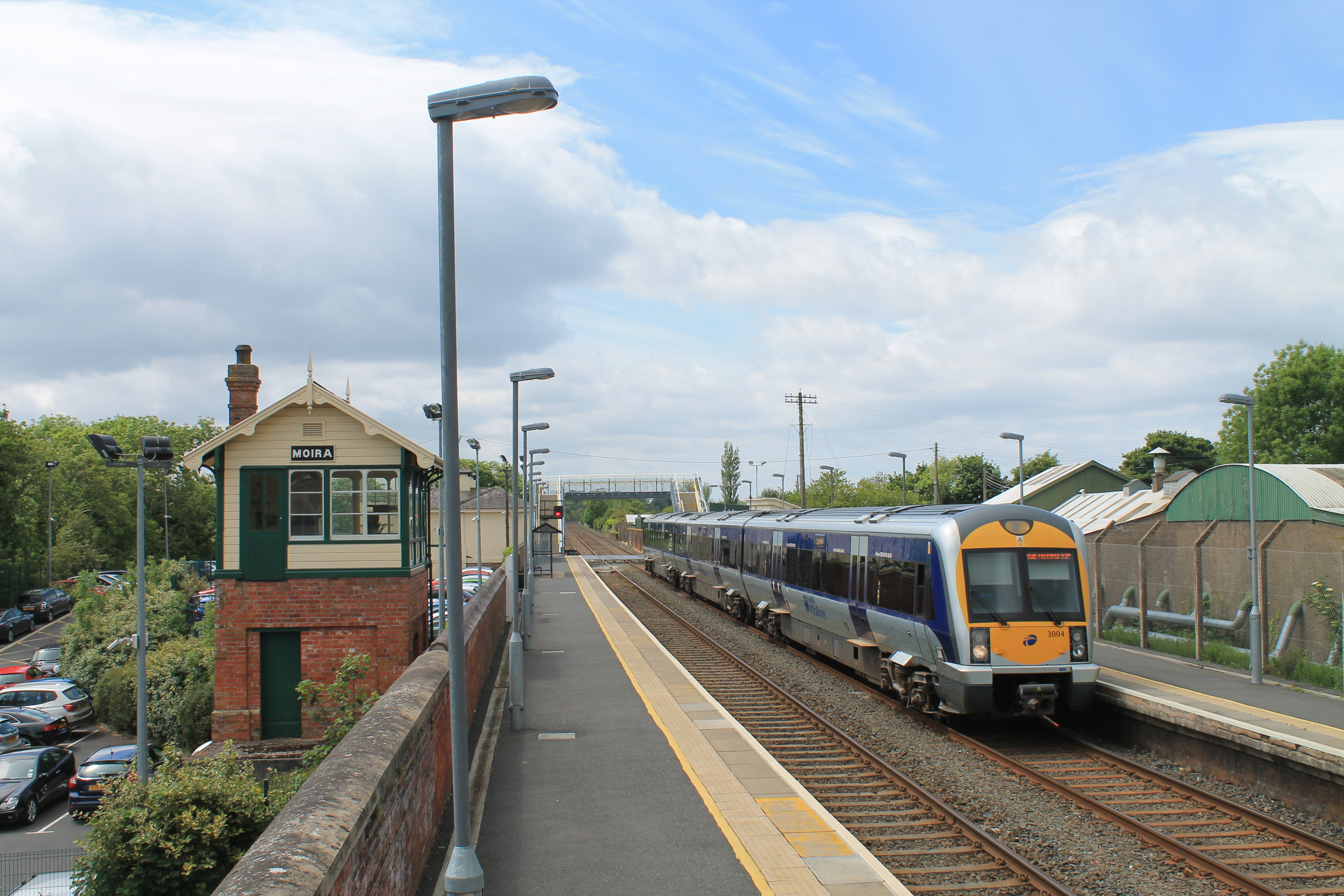
Moira station in the summer

Moira railway station serves Moira in County Down, Northern Ireland. Despite the station serving the County Down town, the station itself is located in County Antrim, the neighbouring Lagan Canal being the boundary. Moira station is the oldest building on the NI Railways network today having been opened on 18 November 1841. The old, now redundant, signal box stands over the station on the Southbound side.

Situated near the M1 motorway, the station is popular amongst commuters from the surrounding area, with over 330,000 passengers boarding or alighting at the station in the 2023/24 financial year.

In March 2014, NIR started construction of a new footbridge at the Portadown end of the station. The footbridge was completed in August 2014.

== Station Buildings ==
There is a station building and signal cabin on the 'down' platform. Off site, away from the platforms, there is a station master's house. NIR have included in their corporate plans for a new footbridge to be constructed at Moira. The signal cabin was recently repainted. During the construction of the station and the railway thousands of skeletons were unearthed, leading to a greater understanding of the Battle of Moira, the largest battle in the history of Ireland, which had occurred in 637 and the previous details of which were much less well known.

=== Lines in the Past ===
The Ulster Railway brought trains from Belfast Great Victoria Street railway station to Portadown and Armagh railway station in Armagh. Later the Great Northern Railway of Ireland had a much more extensive system with trains to Omagh, Enniskillen, Bundoran, Strabane and Derry/Londonderry being linked, which in the 1950s and 1960s was closed west of Portadown.

=== Lines in the Present ===
The station is now part of NI Railway's Newry/Portadown-Belfast service. The station is also passed through by the Enterprise intercity service from Belfast Grand Central to Dublin Connolly on the Belfast-Dublin railway line.

== Service ==
Mondays to Saturdays there is a half-hourly service towards Portadown in one direction, with some trains continuing on to Newry; and to Belfast Grand Central in the other direction.

Extra trains operate at peak times, and the service reduces to hourly operation in the evenings.

Although on the Belfast-Dublin line, Enterprise services do not call at Moira station.

On Sundays, the service is hourly in each direction.

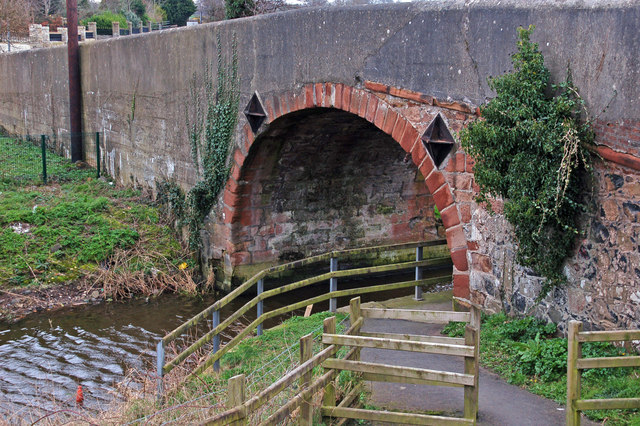
Station Road in Moira, with the Lagan Canal facing towards Lough Neagh.

== Future Link to Armagh City ==
There is a possible future railway reopening from Portadown railway station to Armagh.
