= Broomhedge Halt railway station =

Disused railway station in County Antrim, Northern Ireland

Broomhedge Halt

General information
- Location: Broomhedge, County Antrim; Northern Ireland
- Coordinates: 54.50097°N 6.14048°W
- Grid position: J205629
- Line: Dublin–Belfast railway line
- Distance: 101 miles 13 chains from Dublin Amiens Street

History
- Original company: Great Northern Railway (Ireland)

Key dates
- 29 April 1935: Opened
- 1937: Goods traffic withdrawn
- 1958: Transferred to the Ulster Transport Authority
- 1967: Transferred to NI Railways
- 3 July 1973: Closed

Historical railways
| Preceding station | Historical railways | Following station |
|---|---|---|
| Damhead; Line open, station closed | Great Northern Railway (Ireland); Belfast–Portadown (1935–1958) | Maze; Line open, station closed |
| Damhead; Line open, station closed | Ulster Transport Authority; Belfast–Portadown (1958–1967) | Maze; Line open, station closed |
| Damhead; Line open, station closed | NI Railways; Belfast–Portadown (1967–1973) | Maze; Line open, station closed |
Route map
Location
- Location within Northern Ireland Location within island of Ireland

Broomhedge Halt railway station was a railway halt serving the village of Broomhedge, County Antrim, Northern Ireland. It was situated on the Dublin–Belfast railway line between Damhead and Maze. The halt opened on 29 April 1935 and closed on 3 July 1973.

== History ==
Broomhedge Halt opened on 29 April 1935 under the Great Northern Railway (Ireland). The halt was situated on the Belfast–Portadown section of the Dublin–Belfast railway line, between Damhead and Maze. It was recorded at 101 miles and 13 chains from Dublin Amiens Street, now Dublin Connolly.

Goods traffic at the halt ceased during 1937, although the exact date is not recorded in the Irish Railway Stations Index.

Following the dissolution of the Great Northern Railway Board in 1958, the halt came under the control of the Ulster Transport Authority. It subsequently became part of NI Railways in 1967.

Broomhedge Halt closed on 3 July 1973, ending 38 years of passenger operations. The railway line through the former halt remains operational as part of the Dublin–Belfast main line.

== See also ==
- The Great Northern Mainline (Belfast-Dublin line)
