= Pritchard's Bridge railway station =

Former railway station in County Armagh, Northern Ireland

Pritchard's Bridge

General information
- Location: Kilmore, County Armagh; Northern Ireland
- Coordinates: 54.4896°N 6.2824°W
- Line: Belfast–Dublin line

History
- Original company: Ulster Railway

Key dates
- 1 October 1842: Opened as a request stop
- 1844: Closed (exact date unknown)

Historical railways
| Preceding station | Historical railways | Following station |
|---|---|---|
| Lurgan; Line and station open | Ulster Railway; Belfast–Portadown (1842–1844) | Moira; Line and station open |
Route map
Location
- Location within Northern Ireland Location within island of Ireland

Pritchard's Bridge railway station was a former railway request stop on the Belfast–Dublin line, situated near Kilmore, County Armagh, Northern Ireland. It was located between Moira and Lurgan.

== History ==
The station was opened by the Ulster Railway on 1 October 1842, shortly after the railway was extended from Seagoe to Portadown on 12 September 1842.

Pritchard's Bridge was an early request stop and closed sometime during 1844. Its exact closure date has not been established.

An account published by the Craigavon Historical Society records that the station was situated between Kerr's Bridge and Kilmore crossing, and that extensive stonework from the former station remained visible at the time of writing.

The railway through the former station remains in use as part of the Belfast–Dublin line.
