= Lurgan railway station =

Railway station in County Armagh, Northern Ireland

Lurgan
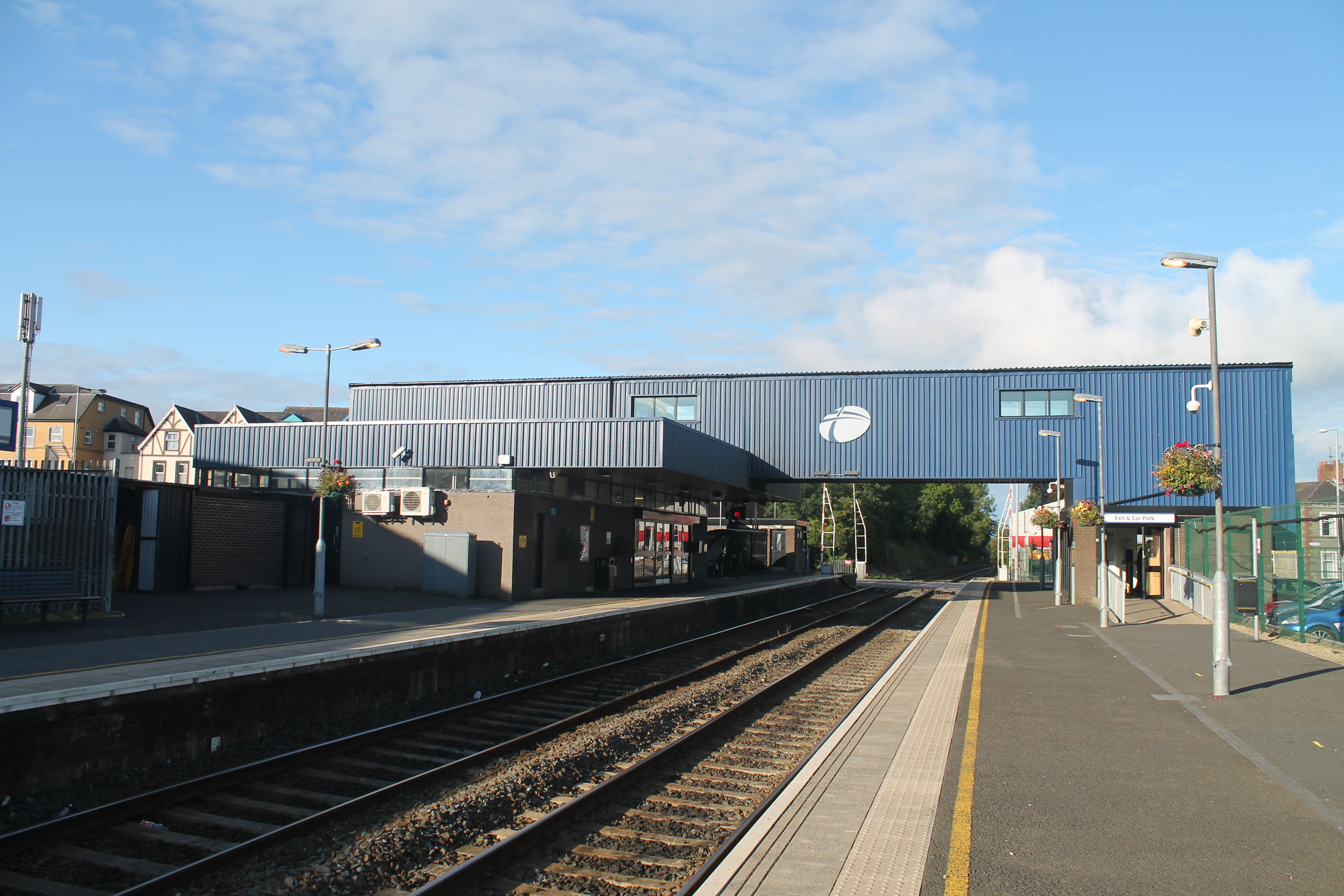
- Lurgan Station in its current 1970s look.

General information
- Location: Lurgan; County Armagh; Northern Ireland
- Coordinates: 54.467°N 6.338°W
- System: Commuter rail & Intercity rail
- Owner: NI Railways LTD
- Operator: Translink (Northern Ireland)
- Line: Dublin–Belfast
- Platforms: 2
- Tracks: 2
- Train operators: NI Railways, Iarnród Éireann
- Bus routes: Ulsterbus Town Services / 352
- Bus stands: 1
- Bus operators: Ulsterbus

Construction
- Structure type: At-grade
- Parking: 124 spaces
- Cycle facilities: Spaces available
- Accessible: Step free access? - Yes, via level crossing
- Architect: William H. Mills

Other information
- Station code: NIR: LU; IÉ: LURGN
- Fare zone: 3
- Website: translink.co.uk/Lurgan

History
- Former names: Craigavon East - Lurgan
- Original company: Ulster Railway
- Post-grouping: Great Northern Railway (Ireland)

Key dates
- 1841: Station opened
- 1890s: Station rebuilt
- 1972: Original station building destroyed in bomb attack
- 2024: Ticket machines installed
- 2025-2026: Planned redevelopment

Passengers
- 2015/16: 784,630
- 2016/17: ▲805,896
- 2017/18: ▲833,131
- 2018/19: ▲875,175
- 2019/20: ▼777,281
- 2020/21: ▼173,330
- 2021/22: ▲445,987
- 2022/23: ▲672,777
- 2023/24: ▲866,717
- 2024/25: ▼734,383
- 2025/26: ▲861,455

Services
Preceding station	NI Railways	Following station
Portadown towards Portadown or Newry	Portadown Line	Moira towards Belfast Grand Central
Portadown towards Dublin Connolly	Enterprise (1 per direction Sundays only)	Lisburn towards Belfast Grand Central

Historical railways
Preceding station	Historical railways	Following station
Seagoe; Line open, station closed	Ulster Railway; Belfast–Seagoe	Pritchard's Bridge; Line open, station closed
Portadown; Line and station open	Ulster Railway; Belfast–Portadown	Pritchard's Bridge; Line open, station closed
Portadown; Line and station open	Great Northern Railway (Ireland); Belfast–Portadown	Moira; Line and station open
- NI Railways; Translink; NI railway stations
Route map
(Click to expand)
Location
- Location within Northern Ireland Location within island of Ireland

Lurgan railway station serves the town of Lurgan in County Armagh, Northern Ireland. Located on William Street, the station is owned by Translink. With 734,383 passengers boarding or alighting at the station in the year 2024/25 financial year, Lurgan is the 11th-busiest station in Northern Ireland.

== History ==
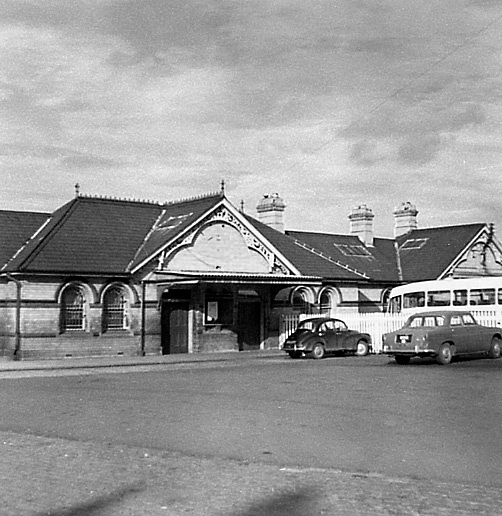
GNRI-style building at Lurgan railway station in 1968

The station opened on 18 November 1841 by the Ulster Railway. Following the merger of the Ulster Railway to the new company Great Northern Railway. The station was rebuilt in 1897 designed by William H. Mills to reflect the new Great Northern Railway's style. After G.N.R.(I). was liquidated in 1958 ownership of the station fell on the newly formed Ulster Transport Authority, then temporarily became Ulster Transport Railways (U.T.R.) before being taken over by Northern Ireland Railways (N.I.R.) in 1968. It briefly known as "Craigavon East" for a time back in the 1970s. On 22 July 1972, the original Great Northern Railway station building was destroyed by a paramilitary bomb, and subsequently the current station building was erected.

== Description ==
The station has 2 platforms. Platform 1 is used for Southbound trains and platform 2 is used for Northbound trains. The platforms are long enough to fit 6-carriage trains but Enterprise trains do not fully fit so the locomotive is usually past the platform end. The station has a building with a ticket office as well as ticket machines, vending machines and toilets. There are indoor and outdoor waiting areas, and a footbridge which is not disabled access friendly so crossing the platforms is only possible via the level crossing for those with a wheelchair. There are also seating areas outside and car parking spaces on both sides of the station.

== Service ==
=== Train Services ===
Mondays to Saturdays there is a half-hourly service towards Portadown or Newry in the westbound direction and to Lisburn and Belfast Grand Central in the eastbound. Extra services run at peak times, and the service reduces to hourly operation in the evenings.

On Sundays there is an hourly service in each direction. There is also a Sunday-only Enterprise service with one morning train (08:36) to Dublin Connolly and one train in the evening to Belfast Grand Central (22:39).

=== Bus Services ===
Mondays to Saturdays there is 4 Ulsterbus Town Services operating on the William Street road outside the station. On Sundays there is no services and some morning services only operate on School days. Some routes operate on an hourly service and others operate on a bihourly schedule.

Preceding station	Ulsterbus	Following station
Terminus	Ulsterbus; Town services 352a	Annaloist; McAlindens Corner
Terminus	Ulsterbus; Town Services 352b	Lurgan; Avenue Road
Terminus	Ulsterbus; Town Services 352c	Lurgan; Drumnamoe
Terminus	Ulsterbus; Town Services 352c	Lurgan; Taghnevan Drive

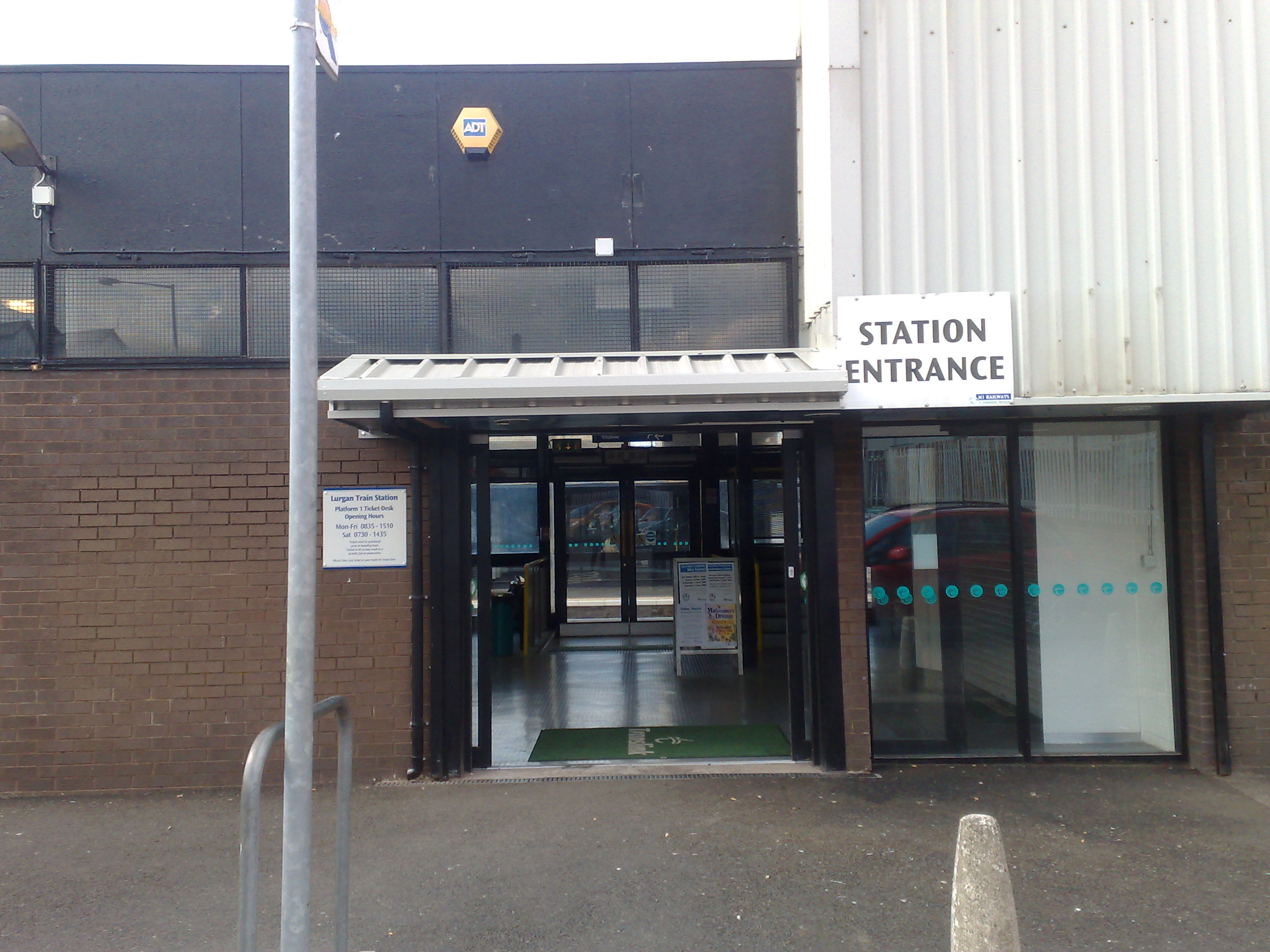
Front entrance of Lurgan railway station

== Redevelopment of the Site ==
On 25 October 2023, Translink submitted a Proposal of Application Notice to ABC Council (Armagh City, Banbridge and Craigavon Borough Council). The plans included demolishing the current 1970s station and adjacent abandoned Musgrave Marketplace to replace it with a new "Railway Passenger Facility". This will include a new station building, a new park and ride facility, shelters on both platforms and a bike/pedestrian bridge connecting both platforms. Work is expected to cost around £20 million and a scheduled start date of Autumn 2025 was given, with expected completion date of early to mid 2026.

== Gallery ==
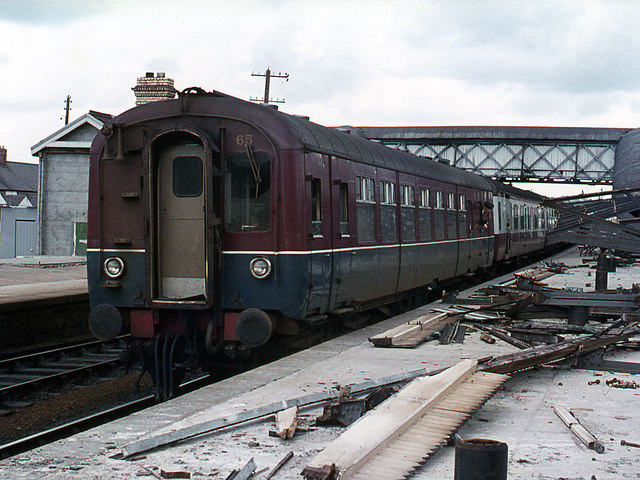
U.T.A. M.P.D. at Lurgan station after the 1972 attacks

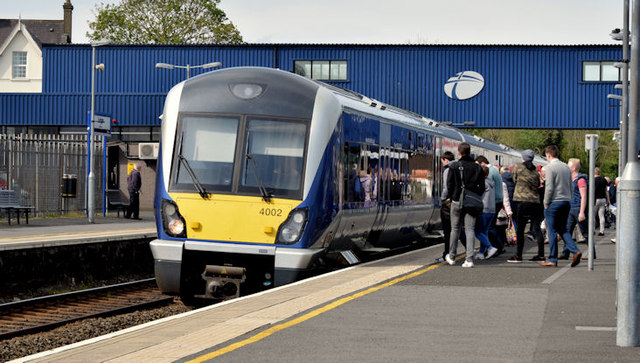
N.I.R. Class 4000 loading passengers at Lurgan in 2015
