= Yorkgate railway station =

Station in Belfast, Northern Ireland

Yorkgate
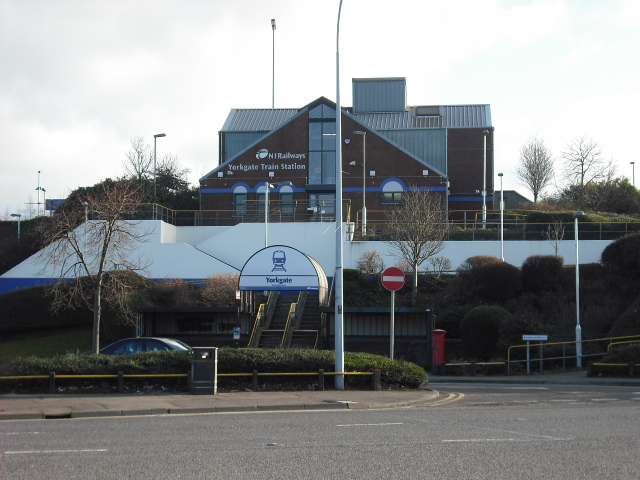
- Yorkgate station in 2009

General information
- Location: York Road; Belfast; Northern Ireland
- Coordinates: 54.6105°N 5.9223°W
- Owner: NI Railways
- Operator: NI Railways
- Lines: Derry ~ Londonderry Line; Larne Line
- Platforms: 2
- Tracks: 2

Construction
- Structure type: At-grade

Other information
- Status: Closed
- Station code: YG

Key dates
- 1992: Opened
- 27 April 2024: Closed, replaced by York Street railway station
- 6 May 2024: Station buildings demolished

Passengers
- 2022/23: 533,882
- 2023/24: ▲647,022

Historical railway lines
Preceding station	NI Railways	Following station
Whiteabbey towards Carrickfergus, Whitehead, Larne Town or Larne Harbour	Larne Line	Lanyon Place towards Great Victoria Street
Whiteabbey towards Coleraine, Portrush or Derry~Londonderry	Derry ~ Londonderry Line	Lanyon Place towards Great Victoria Street
- NI Railways; Translink; NI railway stations
Route map
(Click to expand)
Location
- Location within Northern Ireland Location within island of Ireland
- Location in Belfast
Notes
- Passenger statistics are Translink station footfall figures rather than accredited passenger-journey statistics. The 2023/24 reporting year was the final full reporting year before the station closed in April 2024.

Yorkgate railway station served the north of the city of Belfast, Northern Ireland. The station opened in 1992, replacing the previous York Road railway station nearby. The station was in turn replaced by the nearby York Street station in 2024, with the new station re-using the existing platforms of Yorkgate.

== History ==
Following the demolition of York Road station in 1992, a new station had to be constructed to serve the in-development Cross Harbour Rail Link.

Yorkgate station was therefore constructed to the side of the original site of York Road station and served as a temporary terminus for Larne Line services until the completion of the high-level Dargan Bridge, which joined the Larne Line to the rest of the NIR network at Lanyon Place, allowing services to run from Yorkgate directly through to the city.

The rest of the site of York Road station is now occupied by Northern Ireland Railways' central maintenance depot, while the old works remain, a few yards to the north and backing onto York Road itself. The majority of the depot is visible when passing by train.

Following the opening of York Street railway station, the buildings of Yorkgate station were demolished in May 2024.

== Service at closure ==
From Monday to Friday, there was a half-hourly Larne Line service, with the outbound terminus alternating between Whitehead and Larne Harbour every half an hour. All inbound Larne Line services terminated at Great Victoria Street, except for some early morning and late night services which only travelled as far as Lanyon Place.

Larne Line services on Saturday retained their half-hourly operation, but there were fewer peak-time trains. On Sundays, the service reduced to hourly operation.

Weekday services on the Derry~Londonderry Line also called at Yorkgate on an hourly basis. All inbound services operated to Great Victoria Street, with some peak time services terminating at Lanyon Place. Outbound trains alternated hourly between services to Derry~Londonderry, and services to Coleraine, most of which continued on to Portrush via the Coleraine-Portrush railway line.

On Saturdays, there was a slightly reduced number of Derry~Londondery Line trains, but remains largely similar. On Sundays, the service reduced to seven trains in each direction operating on a two-hourly basis. All services operated between Great Victoria Street and Derry~Londonderry, except for the final train of the day, which only operated as far as Coleraine.

== Port of Belfast ==
Yorkgate was the nearest station to the Port of Belfast. Sailings travelled from here to Cairnryan, where there was a bus link to Stranraer or Ayr. From here, onward connections can be made along the Glasgow South Western Line to Glasgow Central.

Preceding station	Ferry	Following station
Port of Belfast (via Metro Service 96)	Stena Line; Ferry	Stranraer or Ayr (via bus link from Cairnryan)
Port of Belfast (via Metro Service 96)	Stena Line; Ferry	Port of Liverpool
Port of Belfast (via Metro Service 96)	Isle of Man Steam Packet; Ferry(seasonal)	Douglas
