= Belfast railway station =

Belfast railway station may refer to:

- Belfast Grand Central station in Belfast, Northern Ireland, United Kingdom
- Belfast Great Victoria Street railway station, closed station in Belfast, Northern Ireland, United Kingdom
- Lanyon Place railway station in Belfast, Northern Ireland, United Kingdom (formerly known as "Belfast Central")
- Queen's Quay railway station on the former Belfast and County Down Railway in Belfast, Northern Ireland, United Kingdom
- York Street railway station in Belfast, Northern Ireland, United Kingdom
- York Road railway station a closed station in Belfast, Northern Ireland, United Kingdom
- Yorkgate railway station a closed station in Belfast, Northern Ireland, United Kingdom
- Belfast railway station, New Zealand
