= Public transport in Ireland =

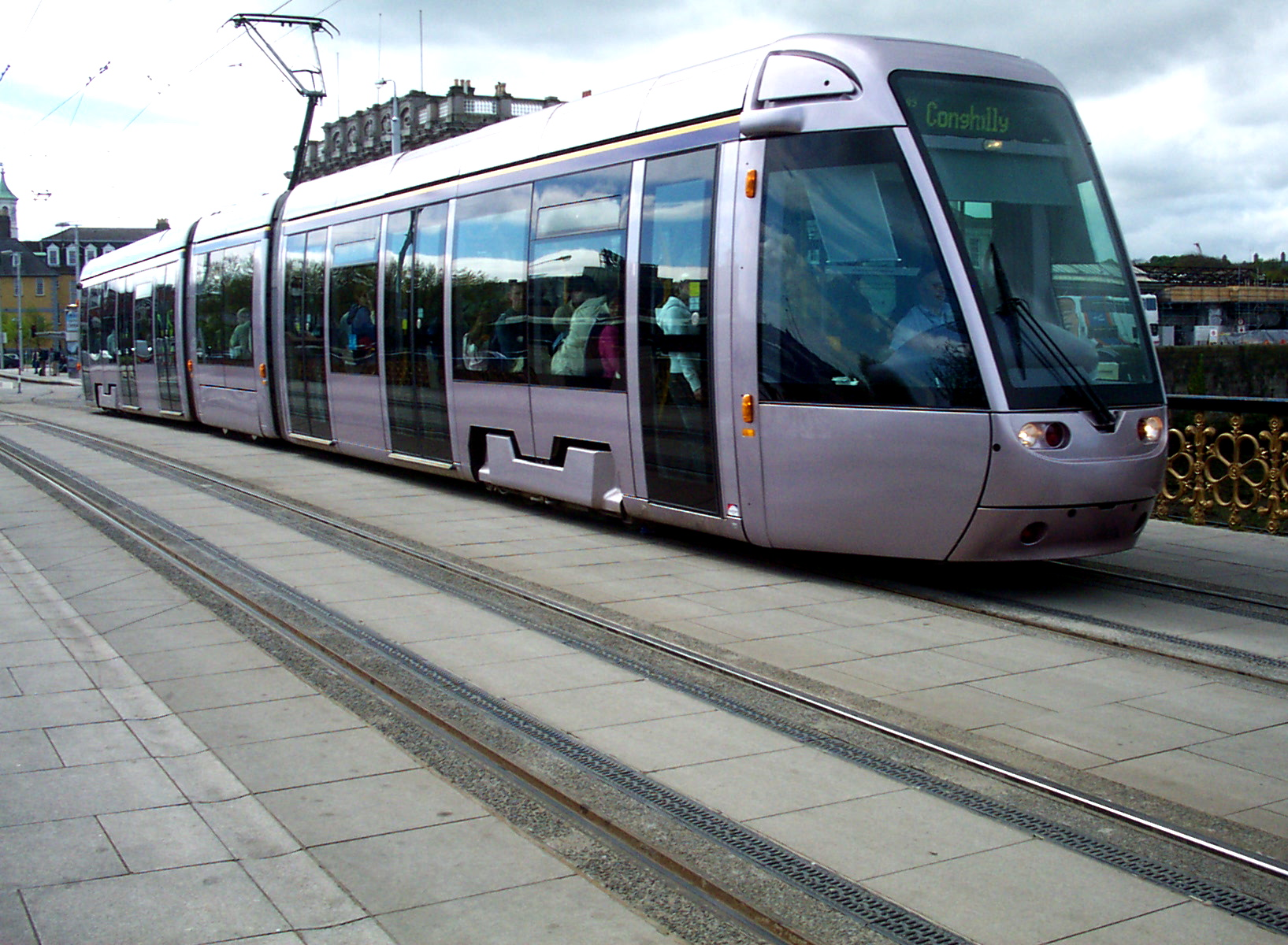
LUAS tram in Dublin.

Public transport on the Island of Ireland exists in many of the island's urban areas and rural areas, and takes a number of forms. Bus transport is the main form of public transport and is common in all cities. The main cities, Dublin, Belfast, Cork, Derry, Limerick and Galway, all have their own suburban rail networks, although Dublin is the only to have its own tram line, in the form of the Luas. The island of Ireland has a population of just over 7 million people, split between the jurisdictions of the Republic of Ireland and Northern Ireland (part of the United Kingdom).

In 2021, the Irish government released the climate action plan. This sees two brand new Dart (Tram/Train) lines west and south of Dublin, Ireland's first underground metro (Metrolink), a brand new electric train fleet delivered by Alstrom, extension to Luas (Tram) to North Dublin Finglas and more funding for Ireland's rural transport, Local Link.

Transport for Ireland is a public information body set up by the National Transport Authority (NTA) as a single point of reference for all public transport within Ireland. TFI (Transport for Ireland) offers the Leap travel card to passengers, which has much cheaper fares.

== Provision by city ==
=== Dublin ===
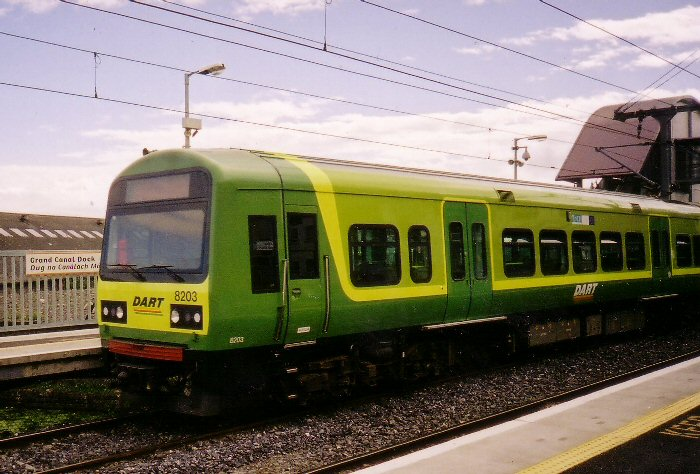
A DART train.

Dublin Bus.

The Greater Dublin area has a population of 2.1 million (CSO 2020) and there are a number of modes of public transport in the GDA run by a number of transport operators, most of them state or quasi-state entities. Public transport in Dublin is overseen by the National Transport Authority. It has undergone expansion in recent years, and the Irish Government plans to invest heavily in the system under the Transport 21 plan which means that approximately 20 billion euro will be spent on developing Greater Dublin's transport infrastructure. Dublin's transit system utilises electrified suburban trains, diesel commuter rail, trams and an extensive bus network to provide service to the population of the Greater Dublin Area.

Buses are the most widely used form of public transport in Dublin. They are predominately operated by Dublin Bus and also a private operator Go-Ahead Ireland, part of the UK based Go-Ahead Group. The bus network consists of 200 bus routes covering the Greater Dublin Area. The Bus Arrival Information Service is being rolled out across Dublin, and provides real-time estimates of bus arrivals at each stop, based on GPS locations of buses.

Dublin also has a commuter rail system, one of five suburban rail networks on the island. The system uses diesel-powered trains and an electrified line. There are four main lines, designated Northern Commuter, Western Commuter, South Eastern Commuter, and South Western Commuter. The trains are operated by Iarnród Éireann.

The Dublin suburban network also consists of an electrified line Dublin Area Rapid Transit that serves the Dublin bay commuter belt.

- Northern Commuter – Dublin Pearse to Dundalk/Newry.
- South Eastern Commuter – Dublin Connolly to Wexford/Rosslare Europort.
- South Western Commuter – Dublin Heuston to Kildare.
- Western Commuter – Dublin Pearse / Docklands to Longford.
- Dublin Area Rapid Transit (DART) – Greystones to Howth/Malahide.

There is also a tram network called LUAS consisting of two lines;

- Red Line: Tallaght to The Point and Saggart to Connolly
- Green Line: Broombridge to Bride's Glen

As of 2006, the Dublin Metro is a planned two-line rapid transit (underground) system set out in the Irish government's 2005 Transport 21 plan to spend 20 billion euro on infrastructure in the Greater Dublin area up until 2021. The estimated cost of the 17 km Metro North is approximately 5 billion euro and will be the biggest and most expensive infrastructural project ever undertaken on the island of Ireland.

=== Cork ===
The Greater Cork area has a population of 400,000 and is covered mainly by bus and suburban rail networks as well as a commuter ferry.

There are a total of 35 bus routes of which, 18 are Citybus routes serving areas like Cork City, Knocknaheeny, Ballinlough, Cork, Mahon, Cork, Mayfield, Cork, Frankfield, Cork, Ballintemple and Farranree, Cork and 17 suburban routes serving towns such as Glanmire, Ballincollig, Carrigaline, Douglas, Midleton, Mallow, Cobh and Goleen.

By 2010, there will be 3 suburban train lines in the Cork Suburban Rail service.

- Cork Kent – Blarney (15,000) – Mallow (11,000)
- Cork Kent – Glanmire (16,000) – Cobh (12,000)
- Cork Kent – Glanmire (16,000) – Midleton (11,000)

There is also a car ferry operating between Rushbrooke and Passage West.

In April of 2025, an "emerging preferred route" for the "Luas Cork" was put out for public consultation by Taoiseach Micheál Martin. The proposed line is an 18km long light rail line with up to 24 stops running from Ballincollig to Mahon Point.

=== Limerick ===
The Limerick greater/metro area has a population of 162,000 and is covered mainly by bus and suburban rail networks.

There are a total of 9 Citybus routes, serving areas such as Raheen, Dooradoyle, Ballycummin, University of Limerick, O'Malley Park, Monaleen, Caherdavin and Castletroy.

Commuter rail services are also important and there are three train lines in the Limerick Suburban Rail network.

- Limerick railway station – Ennis (25,000)
- Limerick railway station – Nenagh (9,000)
- Limerick railway station – Tipperary (5,000)

Parts of north-east Limerick city are served by TFI Anseo, a demand-responsive bus service which commenced there on a trial basis (and in Killarney and Achill Island) during 2025. Instead of running along a fixed route, buses carry passengers to and from requested destinations within the service area booked via an app.

=== Derry ===
The Derry City area has a population of 110,000, with a greater hinterland of 350,000 is served by both rail and bus services provided by the public transport company Translink. There are 15 bus routes serving parts of the city. Which had the monopoly on the route due to licensing rights with the DVLNI. This service is now run by Foyle Metro. For the various surrounding towns and villages around the city, there are Ulsterbus services travelling into the city centre.

The city is serviced by Waterside Station on the Belfast-Derry line which serves Belfast Grand Central and Belfast Lanyon Place, running via Coleraine (for the Coleraine-Portrush railway line to Portrush) and Antrim. The railway line was upgraded with a track relay and planned passing loops to be installed.

=== Galway ===
The city of Galway has a population of 85,000 and there are two companies providing bus services throughout the city – Bus Éireann and Galway City Direct. There are 16 bus routes serving the city and its suburbs altogether – Bus Éireann operates 11 routes, while Galway City Direct runs 5 routes.

Galway Suburban Rail has one rail line connecting Galway Railway Station and the satellite towns of Oranmore (5,000) and Athenry (3,000).

== Rural areas ==
Rural areas in Ireland are served by a mixture of buses and trains.

=== Train ===
Many villages in Ireland had railway stations up until much of the country's lines were shut down during the 20th century. There remain a few villages with stations along main lines, such as Banteer, County Cork along the Tralee-Mallow line, as well as heritage railways on former lines such as the Waterford Suir Valley Railway. Many disused railway tracks have also been converted into greenways, such as the Waterford Greenway.

=== Bus ===
Regular bus services in rural Ireland are operated by Bus Éireann where villages and other population centres lie on routes between towns or cities. These buses stop in villages usually hourly or every few hours.

Other regular bus services are run either by private local bus companies or by TFI Local Link, which operates regular, fixed-route buses in populated regions alongside demand-responsive transport services in more rural areas. These usually run once or twice a week, linking villages up to the nearest town or to other villages with better transport connections. Local Link, since July of 2025, has been in a one-year trial period with "TFI Anseo". As of late 2025, this app-based service was operating in Achill Island, Killarney and north-east Limerick City. Users can use the TFI Anseo app to call a bus to take them from any point within the area served to any other point. Buses do not run on a fixed route.

== Overview table ==
The table below lists cities in Ireland that have public transport systems. It includes only internal services (as opposed to services between towns).

City	Buses	Urban rail	Light rail	Ferry
Dublin	✓	✓	✓	
Belfast	✓	✓		
Cork	✓	✓		✓
Limerick	✓	✓		
Derry	✓			
Galway	✓	✓		
Waterford	✓			

== See also ==
- Transport in Ireland
- Luas
- Rail transport in Ireland
