= Templepatrick railway station =

Railway station in County Antrim, Northern Ireland

Coordinates: 54.701753°N 6.091848°W

Templepatrick
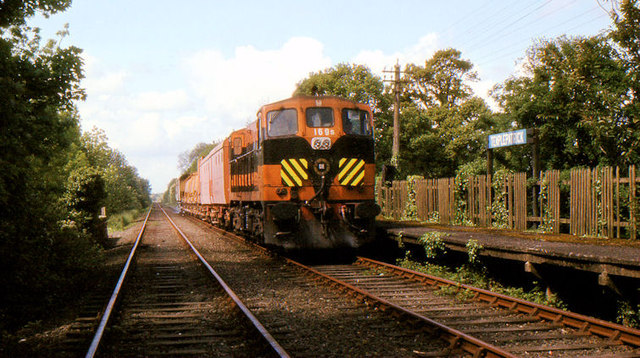
- CIE weed spraying train passing the remains of Templepatrick station in 1985

General information
- Location: Templepatrick, County Antrim; Northern Ireland
- Platforms: 1

Other information
- Status: Disused

History
- Original company: Belfast and Ballymena Railway
- Pre-grouping: Belfast and Northern Counties Railway
- Post-grouping: Northern Ireland Railways

Key dates
- 11 April 1848: Station opens as flag halt
- 9 September 1961: Station closes
- 17 June 1980: Station reopens
- 21 February 1981: Station closes
Location
- Location within Northern Ireland

Templepatrick railway station served the village of Templepatrick in County Antrim on the Belfast-Derry railway line.

== History ==
The station was opened in 1848 as part of the Belfast & Ballymena Railway, which would ultimately become part of the Northern Counties Committee group of lines owned by the LMS. Following the nationalisation of the railways, traffic on the line was reduced until eventually the route between Belfast and Derry~Londonderry was diverted via the Lisburn-Antrim railway line, with the stations on the old route, including Templepatrick, closed. Templepatrick was closed in 1981.

Preceding station	NI Railways	Following station
Mossley	Northern Ireland Railways; Belfast-Derry (until 1978)	Antrim
Mossley	Northern Ireland Railways; Belfast-Antrim (1980)	Antrim
	Proposed	
Mossley West	Northern Ireland Railways; Belfast-Derry	Antrim
	Historical railways	
Doagh	Belfast and Ballymena Railway; Belfast York Road-Ballymena	Dunadry

== Proposals ==
In 1994, Northern Ireland Railways gained funding approval for the restoration of the Bleach Green section of the Derry line, which would allow more direct services into the centre of Belfast. As part of this project, NIR planned to recommission two new stations, Mossley West and Templepatrick. Mossley West opened in 2001, but there was no movement for a station at Templepatrick. However, Translink, the public company responsible for public transport in Northern Ireland, proposed to build a major transport interchange, featuring both a bus and railway station beside the M2 at Templepatrick. As of 2006 it was reported that this could potentially serve as a park and ride for towns and villages in the area of South Antrim.
