= York Street railway station =

Railway station in Belfast, Northern Ireland

York Street
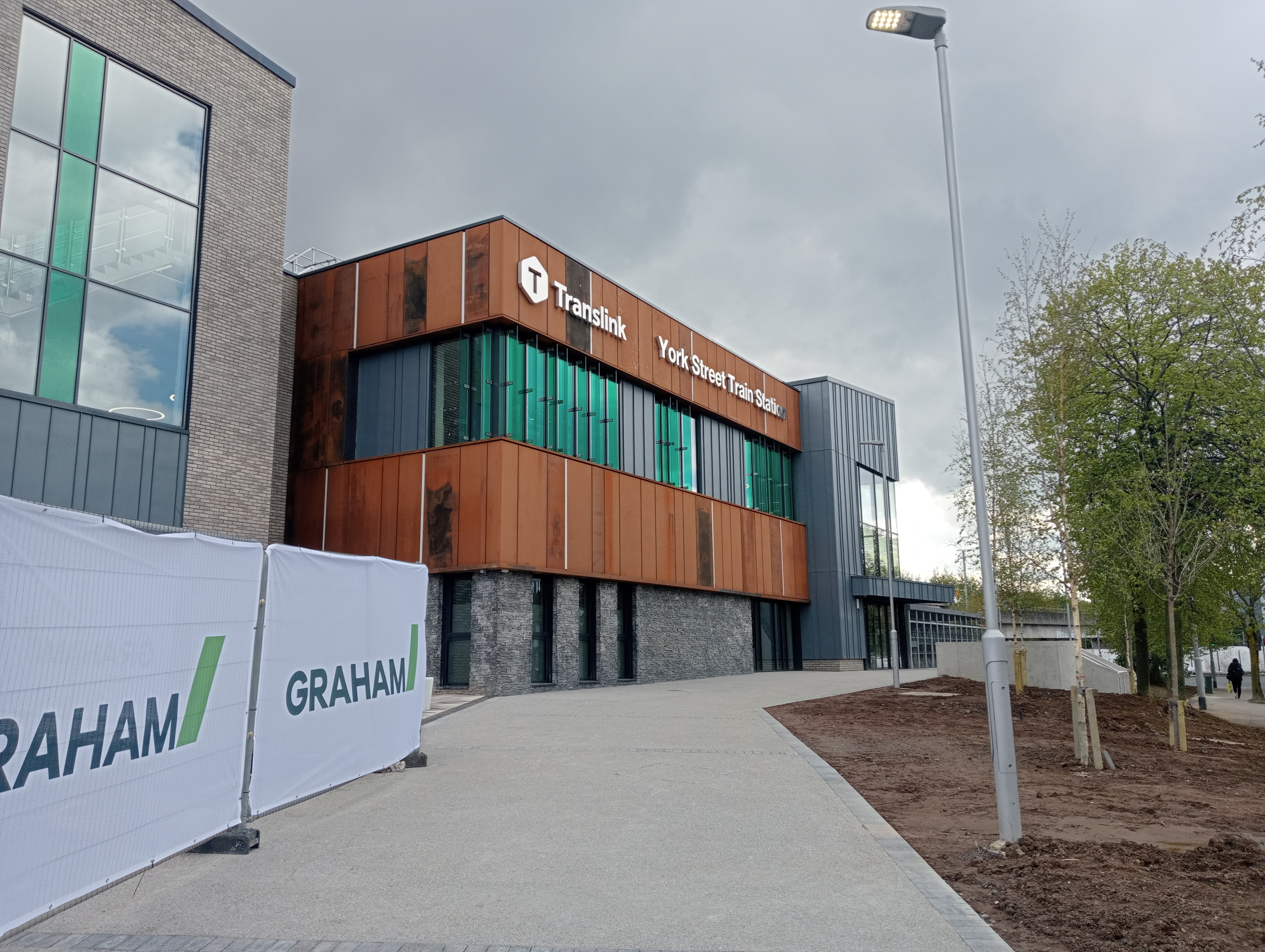
- View of the new York Street station in 2024

General information
- Location: York Street, Belfast, County Antrim; Northern Ireland
- Coordinates: 54.6105°N 5.9222°W
- System: Commuter Rail
- Owner: Translink
- Lines: Derry ~ Londonderry Line; Larne Line
- Platforms: 2
- Tracks: 2
- Train operators: Northern Ireland Railways

Construction
- Structure type: Elevated
- Platform levels: 2
- Accessible: yes
- Architect: Gregory Architects

Other information
- Status: Operational
- Station code: YS
- Fare zone: 1
- Website: www.translink.co.uk

Key dates
- 28 April 2024: Opened to the public
- 29 April 2024: Officially opened

Passengers
- 2024/25: 804,248
- 2025/26: ▲842,870

Services
Preceding station	NI Railways	Following station
Whiteabbey towards Carrickfergus, Whitehead, Larne Town or Larne Harbour	Larne Line	Lanyon Place towards Belfast Grand Central
Mossley West towards Coleraine, Portrush or Derry~Londonderry	Derry ~ Londonderry Line	Lanyon Place towards Belfast Grand Central
Whiteabbey towards Coleraine, Portrush or Derry~Londonderry	Derry ~ Londonderry Line Limited services	Lanyon Place towards Belfast Grand Central
- NI Railways; Translink; NI railway stations
Route map
(Click to expand)
Location
- Location within Northern Ireland Location within island of Ireland

York Street railway station (also referred to as Belfast York Street) serves the north of Belfast in Northern Ireland.

The station replaced Yorkgate railway station, which was on a nearby site and closed after the last train on 27 April 2024. York Street station opened to the public before the first train on the following day. The station re-uses Yorkgate's original platforms.

== History ==
The first railway into the area was the Belfast and Ballymena Railway on 11 April 1848, with the construction of York Road station. This terminus station was situated approximately 200m north of where York Street station now stands. Additional services were added to Londonderry Waterside (now Derry~Londonderry station), Carrickfergus and Larne Harbour following later extensions. While the old terminus was re-developed multiple times in its history, the service destinations remained mostly unchanged until the opening of Belfast Central (now Lanyon Place) in 1976, when Derry line trains transferred their terminus to there via the Lisburn-Antrim railway line soon thereafter. York Road remained as a terminus for just Larne Line services from 1978 until 1992, when construction began on the Cross Harbour Rail Link and Dargan Bridge.

As part of this construction, the York Road terminus was closed and replaced with the smaller Yorkgate station slightly to the southeast. The name "Yorkgate" was taken from the adjacent Yorkgate Shopping Centre, which had opened in 1991. The shopping centre was renamed to "Cityside" in the mid-2000s, however the station name remained "Yorkgate" throughout its life. The maintenance depot at the York Road terminus was expanded to cover the site of York Road station, and the depot remains in operation to this day. Yorkgate station acted as a temporary terminus for Larne Line services until 1994 when the Dargan Bridge was completed, allowing Larne Line trains to terminate at Belfast Central, and later Great Victoria Street upon the latter's opening in 1995. Derry Line trains returned to the site in 2001 following the re-opening of the Bleach Green to Antrim section of the Belfast-Derry line.

In 2020, Belfast City Council approved a proposal to replace Yorkgate station with the current York Street station, as part of a wider regeneration of the area and expansion of the facilities available at the station. Due to the limited site of Yorkgate station and the difficulty in improving accessibility within that footprint, York Street station was constructed as a completely new build on a new larger site to the south, while re-using the existing platforms of Yorkgate station.

Construction commenced in November 2022 and the station building was completed as part of Phase 1 of construction in April 2024, with the station opening to the public on 28 April 2024 and was officially opened on 29 April 2024 by the Minister for Infrastructure John O'Dowd.

Phase 2 of construction, including demolition of the old Yorkgate station building, bridge, and steps to the entrance, plus landscaping and public realm works associated with the bus turning circle and Belfast Bikes dock, were completed mid-December 2024.

== Design ==
The station features a boardroom at street level, with a café on the upper ground floor run by Ground Espresso, as well as new lifts, an escalator, touch-screen ticket vending machines and a new passenger foot-bridge between platforms. Automatic ticket barriers are in use in the station, the first to be introduced on the NI Railways network. There is no ticket office at this station.

A sculpture was commissioned for the new station, located to the south of the premises, known as 'Journeylines', created by local artist, Kevin Killen with collaboration from the local community.

== Services ==
=== Train services ===
On the Larne Line, the station sees a half-hourly service in both directions, with extra services at peak times. Trains northbound call at all stops to either Larne Harbour or Whitehead, with the terminus alternating every half-hour. Additional peak-time services operate to Carrickfergus and Larne Town. Southbound trains call at all stops to Grand Central. The Saturday service remains similar, minus any additional peak-time trains. On Sundays, the service drops to hourly, with the northbound terminus alternating every hour between Larne Harbour and Whitehead, resulting in a two-hourly service to stations beyond Whitehead.

On the Derry~Londonderry Line, the station has an hourly service in both directions. Trains northbound operate to Derry~Londonderry, with some peak-time, late-night, or holiday season trains terminating at Coleraine or running through to Portrush. Southbound trains call at all stops to Grand Central. The Saturday service remains similar. On Sundays, the service remains hourly, however the northbound terminus alternates each hour between Derry~Londonderry and Portrush, resulting in a two-hourly service to stations beyond Coleraine.

These two lines combine to give York Street approximately three trains per hour toward the city centre on weekdays and Saturdays, with two trains per hour on a Sunday.

== Gallery ==
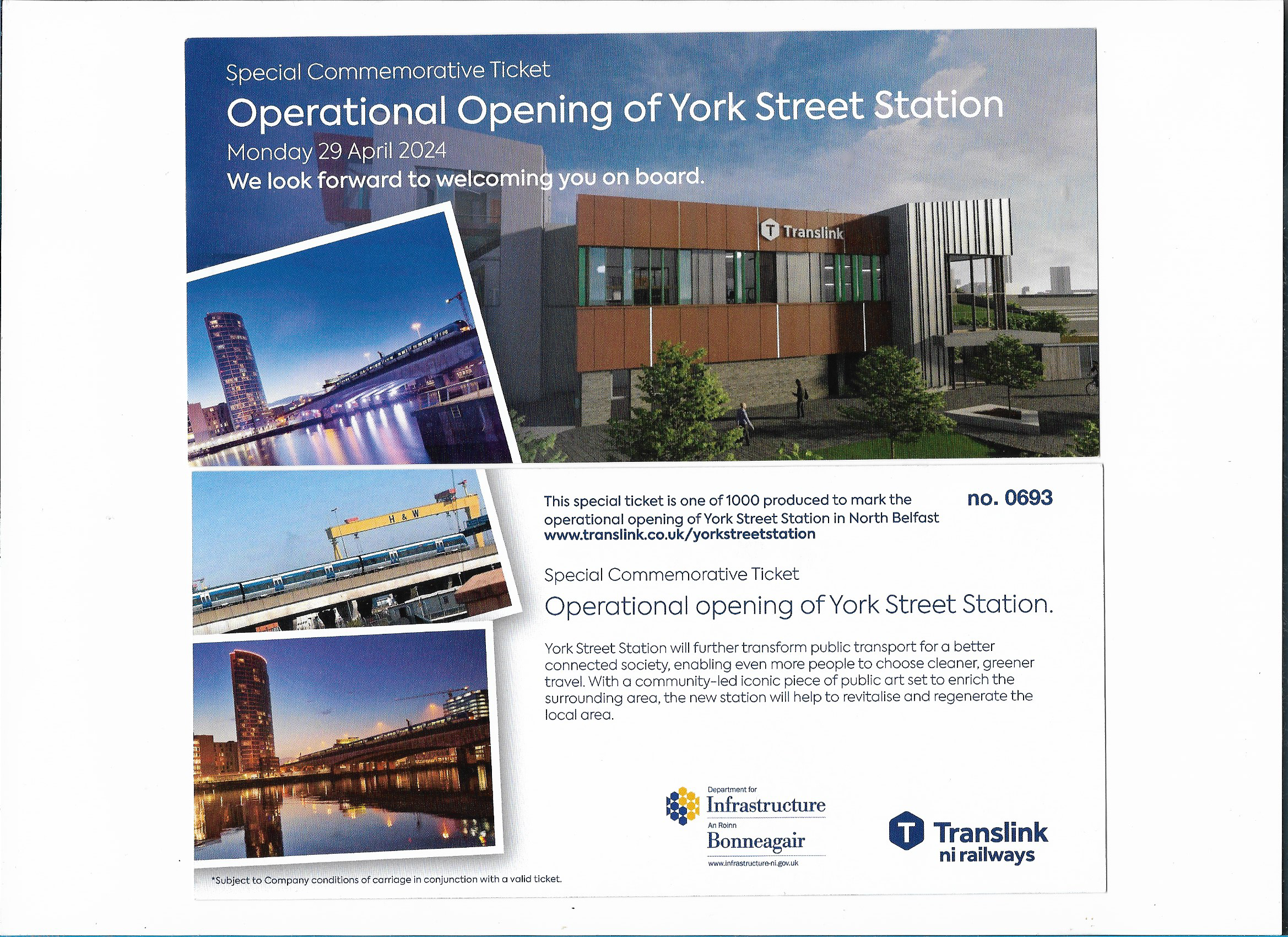
A scan of two commemorative tickets which were handed out after the operational opening by the Minister of Infrastructure on Monday 29 April.

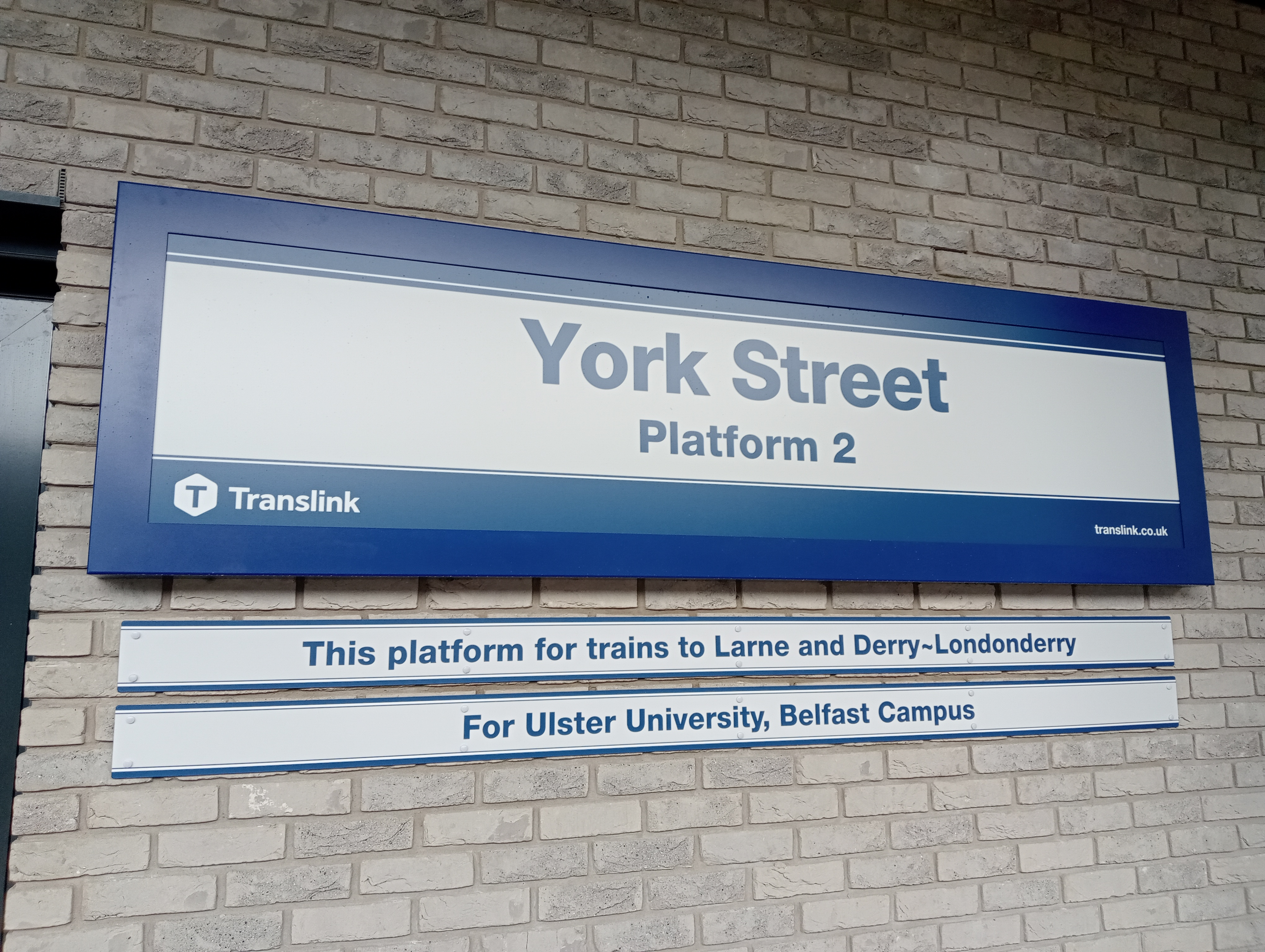
One of the brand-new platform signs on Platform 2.
