= Belfast–Larne line =

Railway line along Antrim coast, Northern Ireland

Larne Line
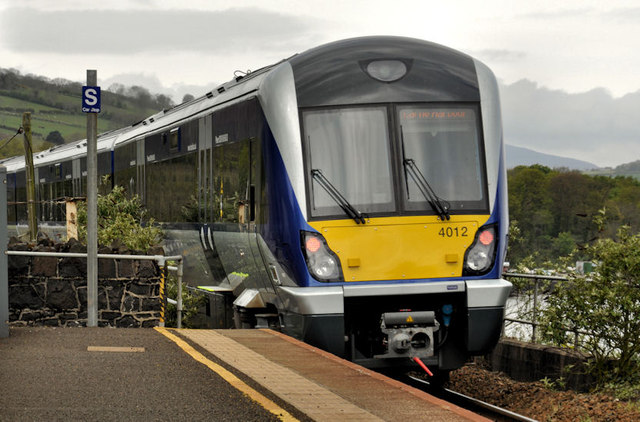
- NIR Class 4000 train at Magheramorne station in 2012

Overview
- Status: Operational
- Locale: Northern Ireland
- Termini: Belfast Grand Central; Larne Harbour / Whitehead Carrickfergus (peak only) Larne Town (peak only)
- Stations: 18

Service
- Type: Commuter rail Regional rail Heavy rail
- System: NI Railways
- Services: Belfast-Larne Harbour; Belfast-Whitehead; Belfast-Carrickfergus (peak only); Belfast-Larne Town (peak only)
- Operator(s): NI Railways
- Rolling stock: Class 3000 "C3K"; Class 4000 "C4K"

Technical
- Number of tracks: Double track (Belfast - Downshire); Single line (Downshire - Larne)
- Track gauge: 1,600 mm (5 ft 3 in) Irish gauge
- Electrification: Un-electrified
- Operating speed: 70 mph (110 km/h)
Route map
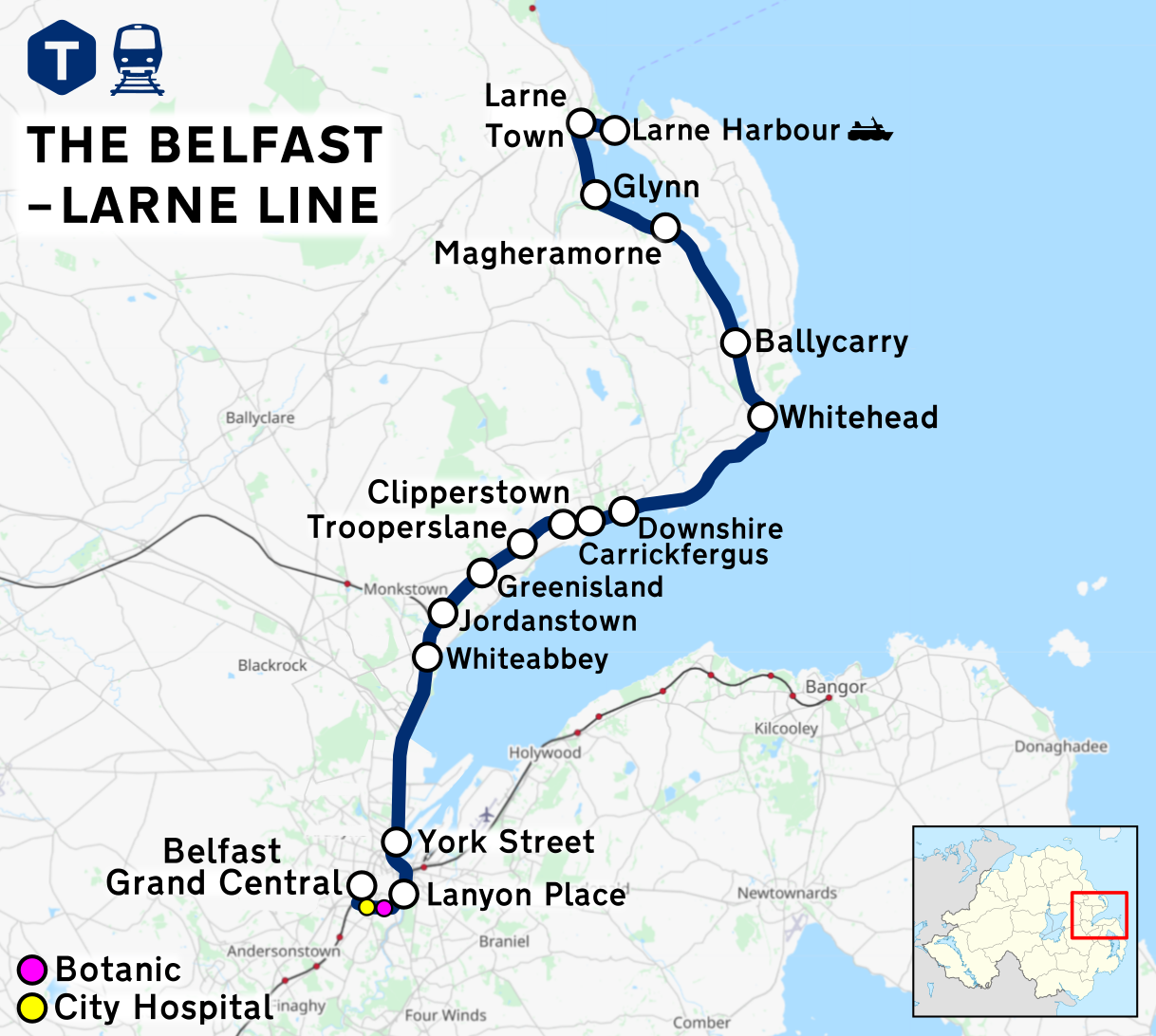
(Click to expand)

The Belfast–Larne line, or Larne Line, is a railway line in Northern Ireland, operated by Northern Ireland Railways. It runs as double track along the majority of its route north along the scenic east Antrim coastline from Belfast to the coastal seaport town of Larne, serving commuters and ferry passengers.

== Route ==
=== Belfast ===
From Lanyon Place, the line crosses the River Lagan on the Lagan Viaduct, branches from the Bangor line, recrosses the Lagan parallel to the M3 motorway on the Dargan Bridge and reaches its first stop, York Street, which replaced the former Yorkgate station in 2024. This in turn replaced the line's original York Road terminus in 1992. Parallel to the dual five-lane M2 motorway (once the UK's widest), the line now heads northeast, past the main Northern Ireland Railways engineering depot and engine sheds, along the coast towards Whitehouse, a former halt. The line then continues north along the coast of Belfast Lough.

=== Whiteabbey ===
At Whiteabbey, the line enters a cutting and climbs towards Bleach Green Junction. The station is long gone here too (1977), but the lines diverge here, with the Derry~Londonderry line continuing to Mossley West and Antrim. The next stops – Jordanstown (University of Ulster, level crossing), Greenisland (former junction) and Trooperslane (level crossing) – are still a few hundred yards inland, and Belfast Lough can be seen from time to time where development is sparse. After Trooperslane, the line passes through a former halt at Mount. This station was closed in the early 1970s.

=== Carrickfergus ===
Carrickfergus town still has three stations, Clipperstown, Carrickfergus and Downshire. The former halt at Barn has been closed since 1977 (around the same time as Bleach Green Halt). At Downshire bridge the line crosses the A2 road once more and from here north, it follows the coastline at low level, offering views over the lough towards County Down and the Copeland Islands.

=== Downshire ===
From Downshire, the line runs through a former halt at Eden. The station here was closed back in 1977 (similar to Barn and Bleach Green Stations). Erosion has affected maintenance along this section, and the line becomes single track now at Kilroot power station (site of a closed halt), where previously it carried on as double track to Whitehead. The outer up track has been removed (officially temporarily) for safety reasons. At Whitehead Station, there is a passing loop and a spur to the former Excursion Station which is the headquarters of the Railway Preservation Society of Ireland.

=== Larne ===
Then north to Larne as single track, there are three intermediate halts, Ballycarry, Magheramorne, and Glynn, each serving villages en route. On the coastal side, the peninsula of Islandmagee blocks views of Scotland, but forms the wildlife wetlands of Larne Lough. Small sections of the track at the Larne end are built on causeways, forming ponds landside of the railway.

On entering the town, the railway again crosses the road inland to Larne Town station before reaching its terminus at Larne Harbour station, sharing its building with the ferry terminal for the Port of Larne.

== Services ==
On weekdays, trains run half-hourly from Belfast Grand Central, with the outbound terminus alternating every half an hour between Larne Harbour and Whitehead. Extra services operate at peak times to and from Carrickfergus and Larne Town. The service reduces to hourly operation after 8pm.

On Saturdays, a similar pattern is maintained to that of the weekday service, minus additional peak-time trains.

On Sundays, the line reduces to hourly operation from Grand Central, with the outbound terminus alternating every hour between Whitehead and Larne Harbour. First services on Sunday are later and last services are earlier.

== Ferry connections ==
P&O Ferries operates ferries to the Scottish terminal of Cairnryan throughout the year.

=== Onward rail connections ===
The nearest railway station to Cairnryan is at Stranraer, with Girvan the next nearest. A two-hourly bus service operates between Ayr or Girvan and Stranraer, operated by Stagecoach West Scotland as services 358 and 360, calling at Cairnryan ferry terminal and both Girvan and Stranraer railway stations. However, this is not designed to connect with timetabled ferry services.
