= Penwhirn Reservoir =

Drinking water reservoir in Scotland

Penwhirn Dam
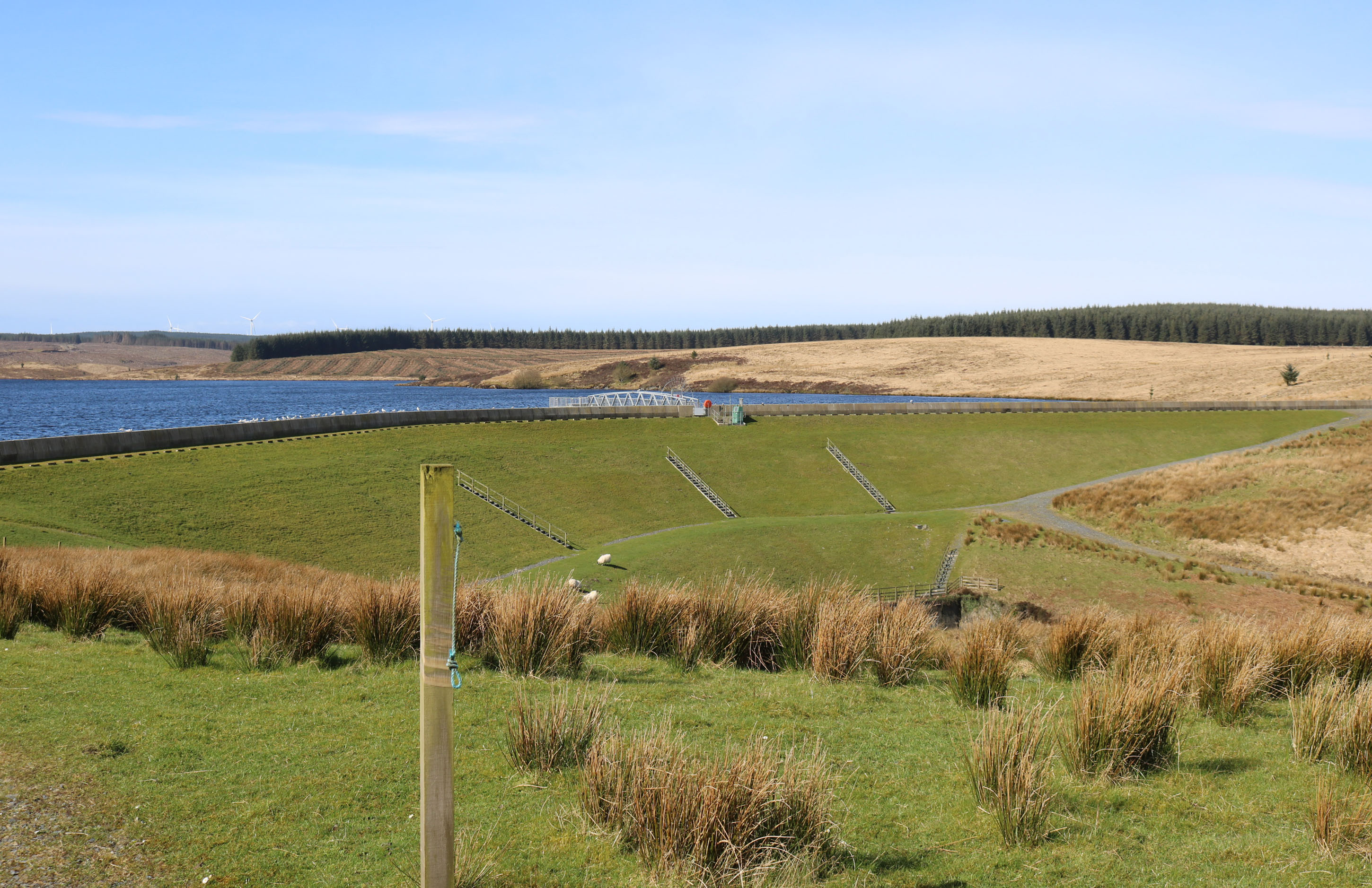

- Location: Wigtownshire, Dumfries and Galloway, Scotland
- Coordinates: 54.986°N 4.935°W
- Primary inflows: Penwhirn Burn
- Managing agency: Scottish Water

Penwhirn Reservoir, is a reservoir in Dumfries and Galloway, Scotland, approximately 3.5 miles (6 km) east of Cairnryan. The reservoir was built in the 1950s to provide water to the Stranraer area. The reservoir has an associated treatment works located to the east of the dam providing drinking water for a population of around 27,000 people. The dam height was raised in 2015 at cost of £8m to increase the capacity of the reservoir by around 40%.
