= Muckamore railway station =

Closed railway station in Antrim, Northern Ireland

Muckamore

General information
- Location: Muckamore; Antrim, County Antrim; Northern Ireland

Other information
- Status: Disused

History
- Opened: 1 July 1905; 120 years ago
- Closed: 9 September 1961; 64 years ago
- Original company: Belfast and Ballymena Railway
- Pre-grouping: Belfast and Northern Counties Railway
- Post-grouping: Ulster Transport Authority

Muckamore railway station served the village of Muckamore near Antrim in County Antrim, Northern Ireland.

== History ==
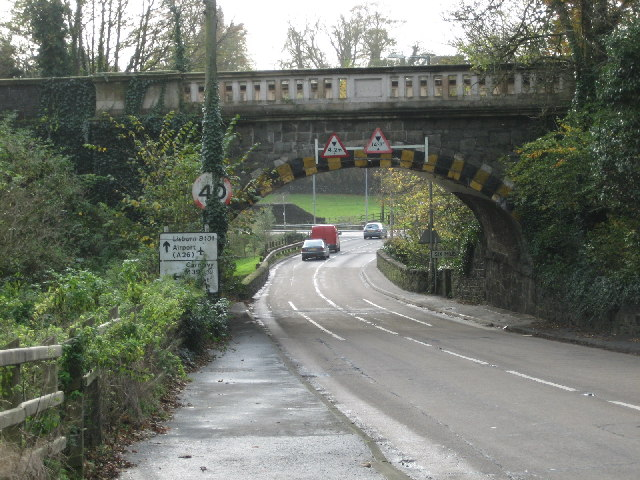
A railway bridge at Muckamore carrying the Belfast-Derry railway line.

The station was opened by the Belfast and Ballymena Railway on 1 July 1905. It closed to passengers on 9 September 1961.

Preceding station	NI Railways	Following station
Templepatrick	Ulster Transport Authority; Belfast-Derry	Antrim
	Historical railways	
Dunadry; Line open, station closed	Belfast and Ballymena Railway; Belfast-Ballymena	Antrim; Line and station open
