= Berkeley Deane Wise =

Irish civil engineer (1855–1909)

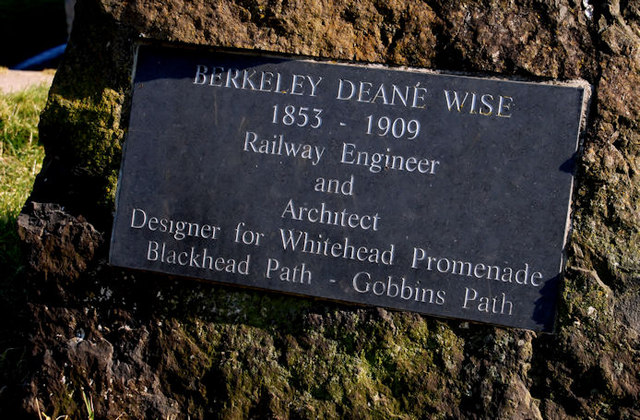
Plaque at Whitehead

Berkeley Deane Wise (2 October 1855, New Ross – 5 May 1909, Portrush) was an Irish civil engineer who made a significant impact on the development of railways and tourism, particularly in Ulster.

== Early years ==
Berkeley Deane Wise was born on 2 October 1855 in Berkeley Forest, New Ross, County Wexford, the son of James Lawrence Wise, solicitor, and Elizabeth Deane. The family moved to 26 Waterloo Road in Dublin, where Wise was brought up. He went to school in England before entering Trinity College, Dublin, in 1871, but he did not proceed to a degree.

== Engineering career ==
Wise introduced somersault signals to the BCDR and the BNCR, like these at Carrickfergus

Wise started his civil engineering career in 1872 as a pupil to Mr Marmaduke Backhouse and then Mr James Price, MICE, Chief Engineer of the Midland Great Western Railway of Ireland, during which time he was the Resident Engineer on the construction of the Navan and Kingscourt Railway.

From October 1875 until December 1877, Wise was Assistant Engineer to the Dublin, Wicklow and Wexford Railway where he was engaged on a new tunnel 450 yards long at Bray Head.

In December 1877 he moved north to become the Chief Engineer to the Belfast and County Down Railway (BCDR), where he stayed for 11 years, living at Salem Cottage on the Knock Road, Belfast.

During this time he re-made most of the line and carried out extensive alterations to the Belfast Terminus at Queen's Quay including new signal gantries. Towards the end of his time on the BCDR, Wise prepared drawings, specifications and estimates for the Quoile Viaduct to carry the railway over the River Quoile in County Down.

Wise was committed to the safe operation of the railway, and introduced interlocking signals at most of the stations. He developed and patented the signalling staff system which bears his name and is described in patent 1030 of 1896. He also gave the Belfast and Northern Counties Railway (BNCR) its characteristic somersault signal.

Wise was elected as a member of the Institution of Civil Engineers in London on 4 December 1888, aged 33, and remained a member until his resignation through ill-health on 27 February 1907. Among those who proposed him were famous Ulster engineers Luke Livingston Macassey and Bowman Malcolm. He was elected a member of the Institution of Civil Engineers of Ireland in 1880 and was its vice president from 1904 to 1906.

== Northern Counties ==
The pinnacle of Wise's civil engineering career was his 18 years as Chief Engineer to the Belfast and Northern Counties Railway (BNCR). He was appointed to this position on 11 April 1888 at a salary of £400 (equivalent to £44,951 in 2025),, and held it until 1906 when his health failed.

Wise ensured that renewal of the BNCR track was carried out to a high standard. He specified steel bull head rails of 83 lb per yard laid on creosoted Baltic redwood. Wise was a strong advocate of good quality stone ballast, and he developed a quarry near Ballymoney where he installed the latest stone-breaking plant. Wise introduced the tablet signalling system and gave the BNCR its characteristic somersault signals. His resignalling of York Road Station in Belfast in 1897–98 was the largest installation in Ireland. From around 1900, Wise also pioneered the use of reinforced concrete for railway structures, such as the King's Bridge in Whitehead.

Wise designed many of the stations of the BNCR (see List of Works). His first was Larne Harbour Station, built in 1890 to a budget of £3,000 (equivalent to £333,301 in 2025). it had a double faced platform, one side serving the broad gauge line from Belfast and the other the narrow gauge from Ballymena, and a clock with two minute hands showing both English and Irish time, which was 25 minutes later.

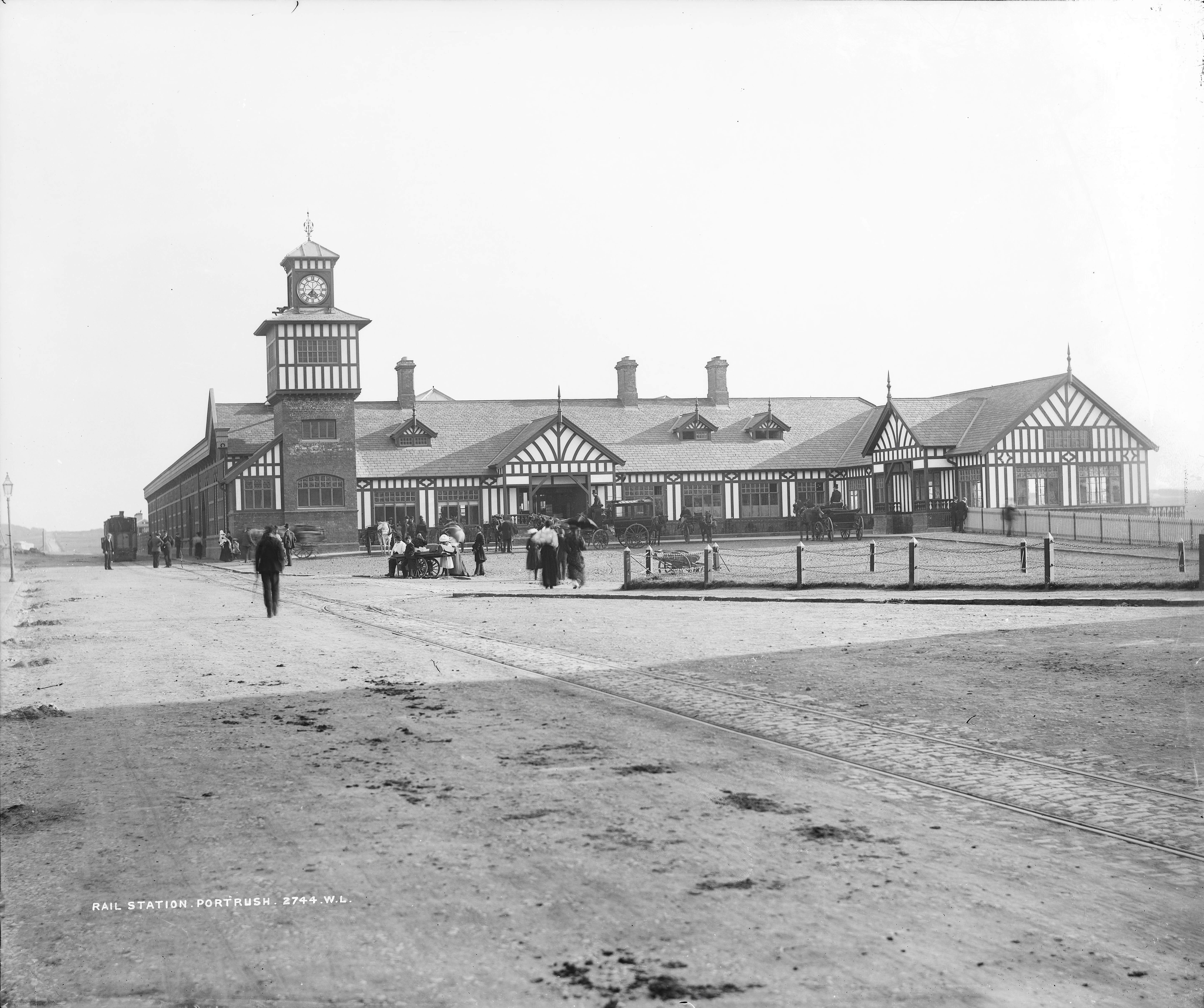
Portrush railway station in the 1890s

But perhaps Wise's most famous building is Portrush railway station, which still stands. By 1891, the existing station was completely inadequate to deal with heavy summer traffic. Wise designed a mock Tudor building with black beams painted on white stucco, all on a red brick base. There was an elegant clock tower, some 50 feet high and three platforms 600 feet long, covered for the first 200 feet by a canopy supported by the girders known as the 'Belfast truss'. On the seaward side, Wise designed the Café and Restaurant for over 250 diners, with a balcony overlooking the Atlantic Ocean. Portrush station was built by contractor McLaughlin and Harvey, opening in the spring of 1893.

Wise gave the BNCR a distinctive architectural style of red brick buildings with large overhanging awnings and half-timbered gables. It owed much to the Old English style of architect Norman Shaw. Two wooden kiosks, designed by Wise, one from Portrush and one from Belfast York Road in a Swiss style, are preserved in the Ulster Folk and Transport Museum in Cultra.

Wise worked under Edward John Cotton, General Manager of the BNCR, and together they developed the most prosperous railway in Ireland, showing a particular flair for the promotion of tourism. So as well as his normal work on the railway and its stations, Wise designed tea rooms, promenades, bandstands, footpaths and golf courses across the network.

Glenariff, one of the nine Glens of Antrim, was described by William Makepeace Thackeray as 'Switzerland in Miniature'. In 1889, the BNCR leased the upper part of the Glen and Wise constructed paths and walkways so that tourists could see the spectacular waterfalls. They were brought down by jaunting car from the narrow gauge station at Parkmore. In certain places, Wise cantilevered the path from sheer rock faces and built rustic shelters at strategic points, including one below the Ess-na-Larach waterfall which tourists could view through coloured glass. Two years later, Wise designed and constructed a tea room at the bottom of the glen, which survives as a restaurant; ever mindful of the needs of tourists, it incorporated a darkroom for photographers.

Wise constructed the Promenade in Whitehead using railway sleepers and made a beach by importing sand by train from Portrush. A bandstand was built on the promenade and there were summer fireworks displays. In 1892, Wise also engineered a path that stretched 1¼ miles to the Blackhead promontory. The lower sections bordered the shore but blasting and cantilevering from the cliffs was necessary towards Blackhead. He designed Sunshine House, a refreshment room beside the path at Blackhead. There is a plaque to Wise's achievement in the car park at Whitehead.

=== The Gobbins ===
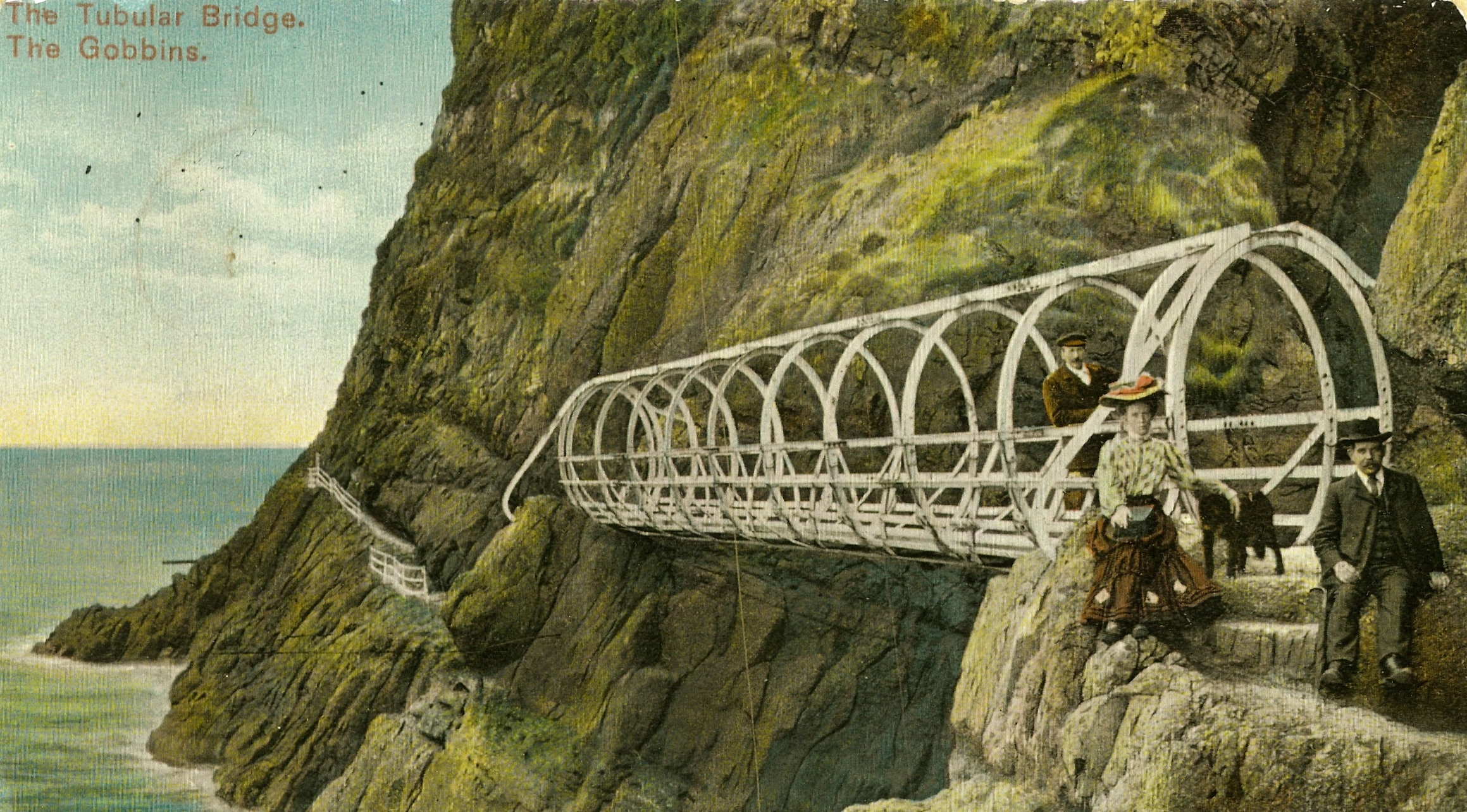
The Tubular Bridge at the Gobbins. Berkeley Deane Wise and his wife, Leah, are in the foreground

One of Wise's most spectacular civil engineering masterpieces was the Gobbins Path, which wound its way dramatically under the cliffs, over 250 feet high, on the Islandmagee coastline. It was designed to bring tourists to the area using, of course, the BNCR. Construction started in May 1901 and the design showed Wise's typical design flair. The 2 mile path was cut precipitously into the cliffs, with tunnels and bridges, including two tubular bridges 70 feet long that connected the 'Man o'War Stack' to the main path. The bridges were built in Belfast and floated to Islandmagee in barges to be lifted into position. The entrance to the path is tunnelled through a basalt outcrop and is known as 'Wise's Eye'. Two of the promontories were named in his honour: Deane's Head and Berkeley's Point.

The first section of the Gobbins path opened in August 1902. An advertisement proclaimed "New cliff path along the Gobbins Cliffs, with its ravines, bore caves, natural aquariums etc, has no parallel in Europe as a marine cliff walk". Sightseers would travel by scheduled services or special excursion trains and alight at the stations of Whitehead or Ballycarry, before travelling to the Gobbins by jaunting car or charabanc. The Gobbins Path was of great interest to a number of scientific and professional bodies. Members of the British Association made a visit on 20 August, shortly after it opened. They elected Wise as chairman for the visit, and travelled by special train to Ballycarry, from where they were taken to the path. In June 1904, Wise was again the host for a visit by the Institution of Civil Engineers of Ireland. Many technical details of the construction of the path and its bridges are contained in the Transactions of the Institution.

The Gobbins Path was an extremely successful tourist attraction, as popular as the Giants Causeway, and Wise planned to continue it over a full-length of 3 1/4 miles to a northern exit at Heddle's Port. An extension was opened in 1906, but then Wise fell ill. In August 1906, Bowman Malcolm reported to the Board that the full scheme would be too expensive, so he was authorised to proceed only to the 'Seven Sisters Caves' and to postpone any further work. After Wise left the company this final extension was opened in 1908, with a spectacular suspension bridge spanning the mouths of the Seven Sisters. The railings and bridges were last painted in 1936 and The Gobbins Path was closed in 1940 during the Second World War. It was briefly re-opened in 1951 by the Ulster Transport Authority (UTA), with admission of 1 shilling for adults and 6d for children. A number of the bridges were strengthened by the UTA, but the path was affected by landslips and maintenance problems which forced its closure in 1961.

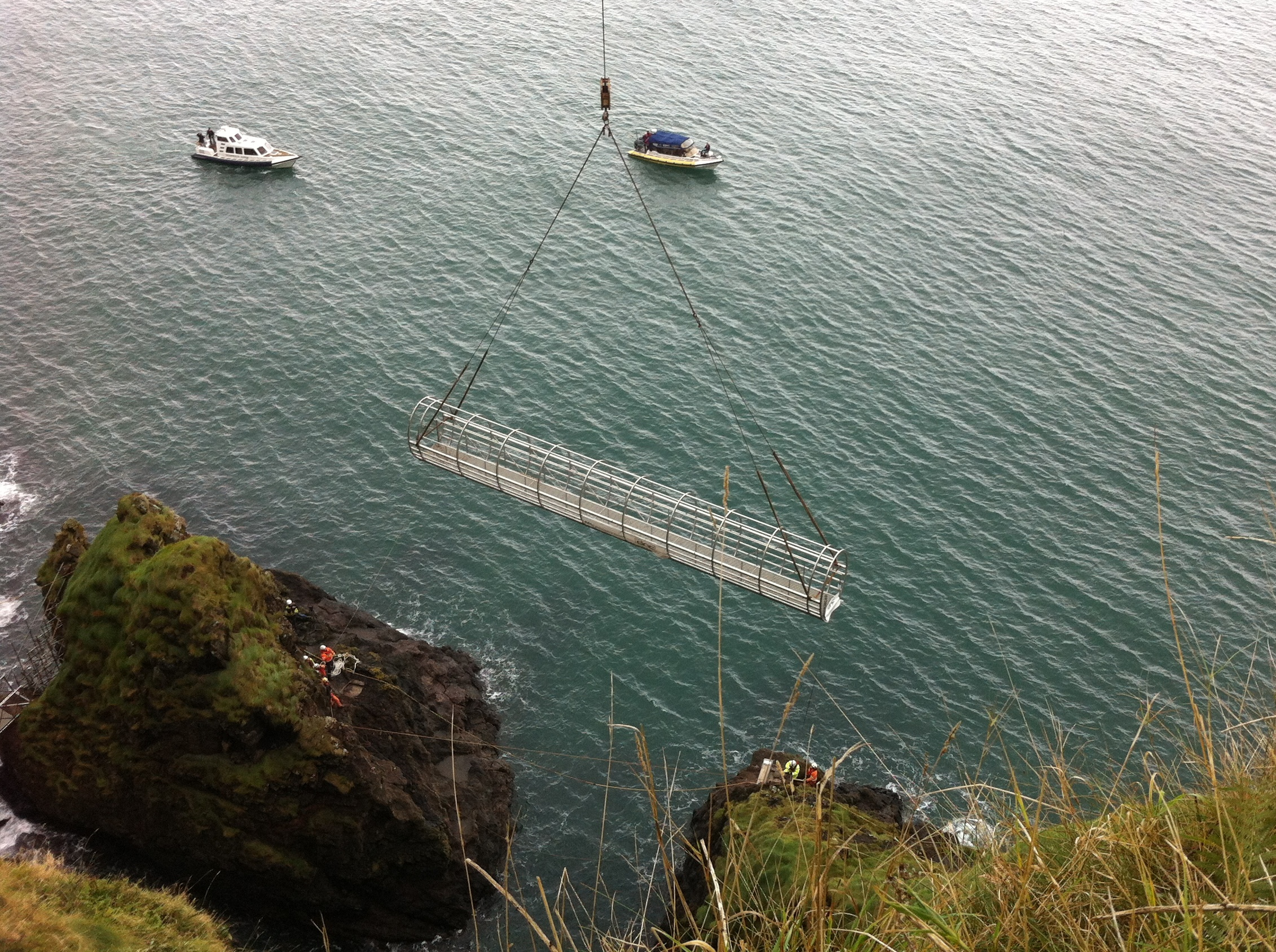
A replacement Tubular Bridge is lifted into place by McLaughlin and Harvey in Autumn 2014

Following many years of feasibility studies, reconstruction of the Gobbins Path was started by Larne Borough Council in 2011. The contractor for the reconstruction was McLaughlin & Harvey Ltd. The new path with its 6 cantilevered walkways and 15 new bridges (4 of them over 30m long) was opened by Mid and East Antrim Borough Council on 19 August 2015 at a cost of £7.5 million.

=== After The Gobbins ===
In the latter part of his career with the BNCR, from 1896 to 1906, Wise lived in Silverstream House, Jordanstown, County Antrim, where in his spare time he kept poultry. The house, now demolished, is near the site of Belfast High School. During this time he worshipped at Whiteabbey Presbyterian Church, where the church records show that he occupied pew 46 and paid a yearly stipend of £3 10s.

In 1896, Wise took as an apprentice his nephew Freeman Wills Crofts, aged 17, who worked for the BNCR until 1929. In 1919, during an absence from work due to a long illness, Crofts wrote his first detective novel, The Cask (1920), which established him as a new master of detective fiction. Crofts gave up his railway career to write full-time, producing a book almost every year for thirty years.

== Later life ==
Following what was described as 'a serious breakdown in health', Wise moved in 1906 to live with his sister, Mrs Harding, at 18 Salisbury Terrace in Portrush. There was little improvement in his condition and he died there on 5 May 1909, in sight of one of his best buildings, Portrush railway station.

He was buried in the City Cemetery, Belfast. Many of his peers from the railway companies of Ulster attended, including his long-time colleague Bowman Malcolm, Locomotive Engineer of the BNCR.

Wise was survived by his son, James Berkeley Wise, who was also a railway engineer, and by his wife Leah, who was buried beside him on 27 April 1922.

Berkeley Deane Wise was an outstanding civil engineer. In his obituary, the Railway Engineer journal said: 'His designs were both original and artistic, and he always strove to make the stations under his charge as attractive as possible. He was a great lover of the beauties of nature, and he will perhaps be best remembered as one who made several of the beauty spots of a beautiful country easily accessible without in the least marring their natural charms. His kindly disposition and gentle manners made him deservedly popular.'

== List of Works ==
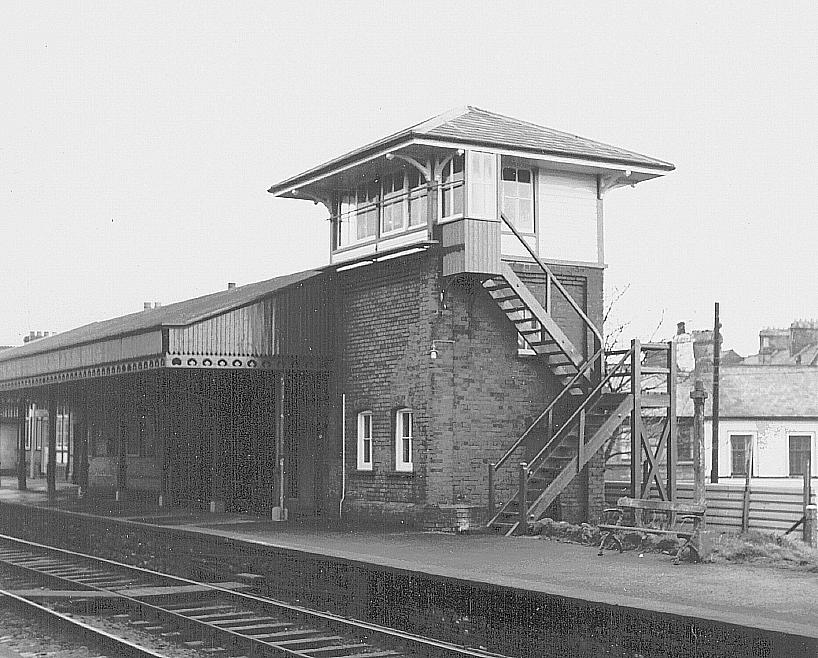
Whitehead railway station

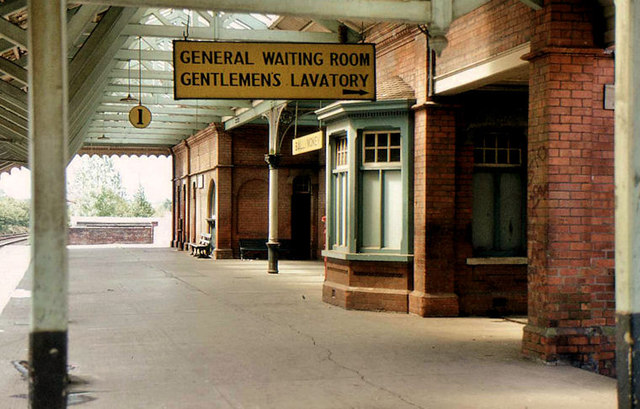
Ballymoney railway station

- Dundrum Harbour, 1884.
- Larne Harbour railway station, 1890
- Glenarriff Paths, Bridges and Tearoom, 1889 & 1891.
- Whitehead Promenade and Blackhead Path, 1892.
- Portrush railway station, 1893.
- Ballymoney railway station, 1893.
- Greenisland railway station, 1893.
- Northern Counties Hotel, Portrush (alterations and additions), 1884 & 1892.
- Carrickfergus railway station, 1895.
- Whiteabbey railway station (down platform), 1896
- Jordanstown railway station (down platform), 1896
- Glynn railway station, 1896.
- Trooperslane railway station, 1896.
- York Road railway station Belfast (Port Cochere, Clock Tower, Midland Hotel), 1894–1898
- Portstewart Tramway Terminus, 1899.
- Whitehead railway station (extension), 1900.
- The Gobbins Path, Islandmagee, 1902.
- Whitehead Beach Promenade, Whitehead,
- Laharna Hotel, Larne (alterations), 1905.
- Limavady railway station, 1906.
- Antrim railway station, 1902.
- Ballymena railway station, 1904.
