= Antrim railway station =

Station in County Antrim, Northern Ireland

Antrim
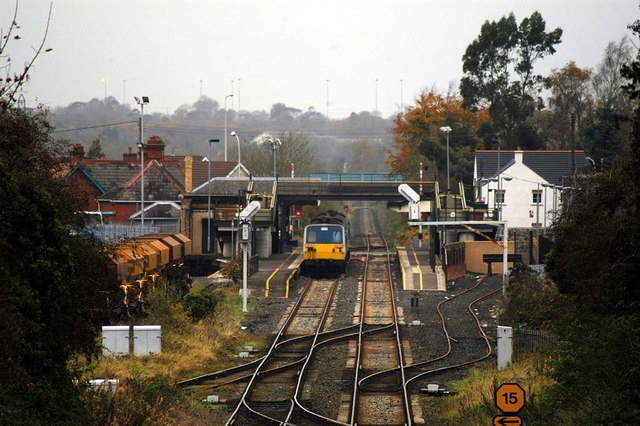
- Antrim railway station

General information
- Other names: Antrim Bus & Train Station
- Location: 38 Station Road, Antrim, BT41 4AB; Antrim and Newtownabbey Borough Council; Northern Ireland
- Coordinates: 54.7182°N 6.2115°W
- System: Commuter rail
- Owner: Translink (Northern Ireland)
- Line: Derry ~ Londonderry Line
- Distance: 21 miles 62 chains (35.0 km) from Belfast York Road via Greenisland (historical mileage)
- Platforms: 4 (2 disused)
- Tracks: 4
- Train operators: NI Railways
- Bus stands: 4
- Bus operators: Ulsterbus and Goldline

Construction
- Structure type: At-grade
- Parking: 262 spaces (including 14 accessible spaces and 2 electric charging spaces)
- Cycle facilities: Bicycle parking available
- Accessible: yes
- Architect: Berkeley Deane Wise
- Architectural style: Tudor Revival architecture

Other information
- Status: Operational
- Station code: AN
- Classification: Grade B2 listed building
- Website: www.translink.co.uk/Antrim

History
- Rebuilt: 1901–1902
- Original company: Belfast and Ballymena Railway

Key dates
- 11 April 1848: Opened
- 1871: Renamed Antrim Junction
- By July 1922: Renamed Antrim
- 1901–1902: Station rebuilt
- 4 January 1965: Goods traffic ceased
- 2008: Refurbished
- 2013: Integrated bus and rail station opened

Passengers
- 2022/23: 519,674
- 2023/24: ▲674,114
- 2024/25: ▼661,714
- 2025/26: ▲751,578

Services
Preceding station	NI Railways	Following station
Ballymena towards Coleraine, Portrush or Derry~Londonderry	Derry ~ Londonderry Line	Mossley West towards Belfast Grand Central

Disused railways
Preceding station	Disused railways	Following station
Terminus	NI Railways; Lisburn–Antrim (1974–2003)	Crumlin; Line Disused Station Closed

Historical railways
Preceding station	Historical railways	Following station
Drumsough Junction; Line open, station closed	Belfast and Ballymena Railway; Belfast York Road–Ballymena (1848–1860)	Dunadry; Line open, station closed
Cookstown Junction; Line open, station closed	Belfast and Northern Counties Railway; Belfast York Road–Ballymena (1860–1903)	Dunadry; Line open, station closed
Cookstown Junction; Line open, station closed	Northern Counties Committee; Belfast York Road–Ballymena (1905–1934)	Muckamore; Line open, station closed
Cookstown Junction; Line open, station closed	Northern Counties Committee; Belfast–Ballymena via Bleach Green (1934–1949)	Muckamore; Line open, station closed
Cookstown Junction; Closed to passengers in 1950	Ulster Transport Authority; Belfast–Ballymena (1949–1967)	Muckamore; Closed to passengers in 1961
Route map
Location
- Location within Northern Ireland Location within island of Ireland

Antrim railway station, also known as Antrim Bus and Rail Station, is an integrated bus and railway station serving the town of Antrim in County Antrim, Northern Ireland. The station is operated by NI Railways and Ulsterbus, both part of Translink.

Opened on 11 April 1848 by the Belfast and Ballymena Railway, the station serves the Belfast-Derry railway line, with trains travelling towards Belfast via Bleach Green Junction, Mossley West and York Street.

The station was historically connected to the Lisburn-Antrim railway line, which provided an alternative railway route towards Belfast via Lisburn and Knockmore Junction. Following changes to Belfast-Derry services and the reopening of the Bleach Green Junction route on 9 June 2001, regular passenger services on the Lisburn-Antrim line were withdrawn in June 2003. The railway was subsequently mothballed.

The station was redeveloped as an integrated bus and rail interchange between 2012 and 2013, incorporating the historic station building designed by Berkeley Deane Wise in 1901-1902. The railway station building, detached platform shelter and associated walling are Grade B2 listed.

== History ==
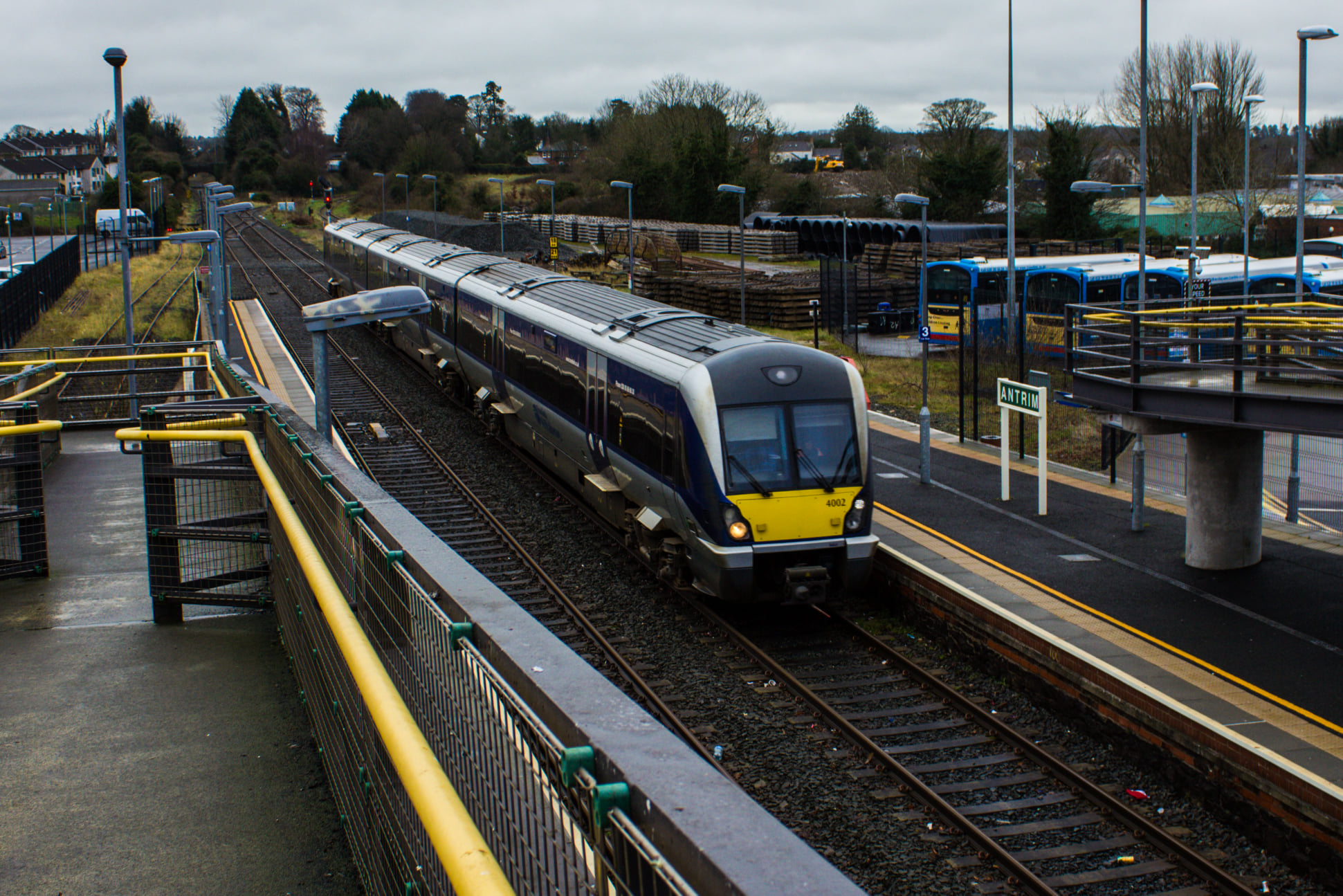
NIR Class 4000 train arriving at Antrim on a service to Derry~Londonderry

=== Early history (1848-1903) ===
Antrim railway station opened on 11 April 1848 as part of the Belfast and Ballymena Railway. The railway was constructed under the direction of engineer Charles Lanyon and provided a railway connection between Belfast and Ballymena.The Belfast and Ballymena Railway became part of the Belfast and Northern Counties Railway in 1860. The station subsequently developed as a railway junction following the opening of the Dublin and Antrim Junction Railway in 1871, connecting Antrim with the railway network towards Lisburn.

=== Reconstruction (1901-1902) ===
The original station buildings were replaced between 1901 and 1902 under the direction of Berkeley Deane Wise, the engineer of the Belfast and Northern Counties Railway.The replacement station was constructed in an Edwardian domestic revival style, incorporating red brickwork, decorative terracotta panels and half-timbered gables. The design also included ornamental cast-iron columns and platform shelters.The station's cast-iron platform columns and pedestrian footbridge were manufactured by Walter MacFarlane's Saracen Foundry in Glasgow.The railway station building, detached platform shelter and associated walling were designated Grade B2 listed structures on 1 March 2005.The station historically included facilities for goods traffic. A former goods yard office survives on the opposite side of the railway from the main station building, although it is no longer in railway use or ownership.

=== Northern Counties Committee and Ulster Transport Authority ===
Following the acquisition of the Belfast and Northern Counties Railway by the Midland Railway in 1903, Antrim became part of the Northern Counties Committee (NCC). The NCC subsequently passed to the London, Midland and Scottish Railway in 1923. On 1 April 1949, the former Northern Counties Committee railway network was transferred to the Ulster Transport Authority (UTA). Antrim continued to operate under the UTA until the establishment of Northern Ireland Railways in 1967.Goods traffic at Antrim ceased on 4 January 1965, although passenger services continued.

=== Changes to railway services (1960-2003) ===
Passenger services on the Lisburn-Antrim railway line were withdrawn in 1960, although the line remained available for other railway operations. Passenger services were subsequently restored, with the route forming part of the railway network towards Belfast and Derry.On 9 June 2001, the direct railway route between Antrim and Belfast via Bleach Green Junction was reopened after extensive modernisation. The project reduced journey times between Belfast and Derry~Londonderry by approximately 30 minutes. A limited passenger service continued along the Lisburn-Antrim route until June 2003, when services were withdrawn because of low passenger usage. The railway was retained as a potential diversionary route before being mothballed.

=== Integrated bus and rail station (2012-2013) ===
Work began in 2012 on the redevelopment of Antrim railway station into a modern integrated bus and rail transport interchange. The project was completed in 2013, providing improved facilities for passengers using both transport services.

The redevelopment incorporated the historic railway station building, retaining its architectural features while providing modern passenger facilities. The project was part of a wider programme to improve public transport facilities and accessibility in Northern Ireland.

== Services ==
Antrim is served by NI Railways trains on the Belfast-Derry railway line. Services operate towards Belfast Grand Central via Mossley West, York Street and Lanyon Place. In the opposite direction, services operate towards Ballymena, Coleraine, Portrush and Derry~Londonderry.

The station has two operational passenger platforms, with step free access, lifts and boarding ramps available. Other facilities include an integrated bus interchange, ticketing facilities, public toilets, bicycle parking and a park and ride car park.

== Future proposals ==
The reopening of the Lisburn-Antrim railway line, including a proposed rail connection to Belfast International Airport, was recommended in the All-Island Strategic Rail Review, published jointly by the Irish Department of Transport and Northern Ireland's Department for Infrastructure on 31 July 2024. The review identified reinstatement of the railway as a means of improving regional connectivity and providing rail access to Belfast International Airport. The proposals form part of a wider strategy for railway development across the island of Ireland up to 2050.

In 2025, Translink published the findings of a feasibility study examining the reopening of the railway between Antrim and Lisburn. The study considered reinstating passenger services, with potential new halts serving Belfast International Airport, Crumlin, Glenavy and Ballinderry. Options for serving the airport included a railway spur towards the terminal or an interchange station on the existing railway with an onward transport connection.

The feasibility study also proposed constructing a third passenger platform at Antrim to enable interchange between reinstated Lisburn-Antrim services and the existing Belfast–Derry railway line. The estimated capital cost of reopening the line ranged from £300 million for a non-electrified railway to more than £500 million with full overhead electrification. The proposals remain subject to further development, planning approval and funding.

== Gallery ==
Train at Platform 1 in Antrim in 2012

Withdrawn rolling stock in Antrim station in 1983

Antrim station 1995
