= Cairnryan =

Coordinates: 54.971°N 5.018°W

Cairnryan: Scottish Gaelic: Càrn Rìoghain / Machair an Sgithich; Scots: The Cairn
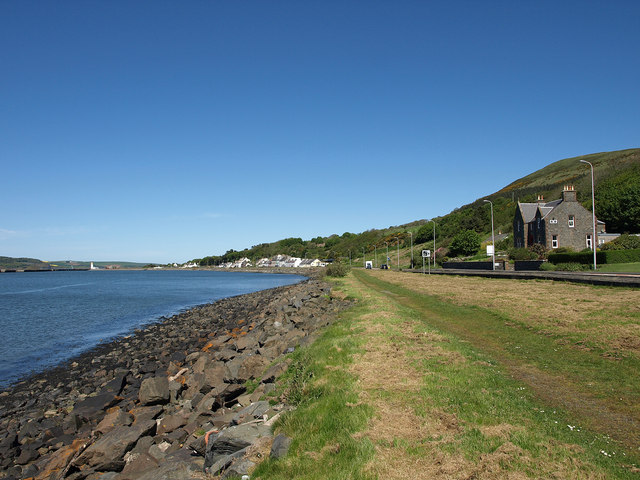

- Location within Dumfries and Galloway
- Population: 142 (2001 Census)
- OS grid reference: NX067683
- Council area: Dumfries and Galloway
- Lieutenancy area: Wigtown
- Country: Scotland
- Sovereign state: United Kingdom
- Post town: STRANRAER
- Postcode district: DG9
- Dialling code: 01581
- Police: Scotland
- Fire: Scottish
- Ambulance: Scottish
- UK Parliament: Dumfries and Galloway
- Scottish Parliament: Galloway and West Dumfries

Cairnryan (Scots: The Cairn; Scottish Gaelic: Càrn Rìoghain or Machair an Sgithich) is a village in the historical county of Wigtownshire, Dumfries and Galloway, Scotland. It lies on the eastern shore of Loch Ryan, six miles (ten kilometres) north of Stranraer and 81 miles (130 km) southwest of Glasgow.

== History ==
Cairnryan is a linear settlement, looking across the main A77 road to Loch Ryan. It was established in 1701, when Lochryan House was built for Lt. Colonel Andrew Agnew, 9th of Croach, (along with many of the houses, to the north of the village) for workers on the Lochryan Estate. A local slate quarry, next to Cairn Hill, which overlooks the village, provided the slates for the housing. The estate included a deer park and a bowling green. Lochryan House was re-modelled in the 1820s and is visible from the main road.

Into the 1800s, Cairnryan was an important staging post on the coach route to Ayr, with half a dozen inns along this short stretch of coast. It also achieved a less desirable reputation as a haunt of highwaymen preying on that same passing traffic.

For two hundred years Cairnryan had been noted for its deep water facility and during World War II it became No.2 Military Port, with three harbour piers and a military railway, linking the village with nearby Stranraer. To make room for the development of new railway tracks, the properties on the loch side of the village were demolished, reducing the local population as the occupiers were re-housed elsewhere.

Of the three piers built, only one pier remains; one being dismantled and the other being destroyed (in an ammunition explosion) shortly after World War II. The remaining pier is now in a state of considerable disrepair (but is still used by anglers).

Another role, during World War II, was the building of some sections for the two Mulberry Harbours, the floating ports on which the Allies depended after D-Day. Troops were based locally, in military camps. At the end of the World War II, the Atlantic U-boat fleet surrendered in Loch Ryan and was anchored in the port before being towed to the North Channel and scuttled, this activity was codenamed 'Operation Deadlight'.

In the early 1950s, houses were built at Claddyburn Terrace at the South end of the village, which increased the village's population.

For a period after the Second World War, (until at least 1958), the port was used to receive, by rail and by Liberty and Victory ships, surplus/time-expired ammunition which was loaded onto landing craft for dumping in deep water. Ammunition being transported by rail had their trucks labelled with the address, "Davy Jones' Locker, Cairnryan". Handling and disposal was carried out by 13 Company Royal Pioneer Corps, based at the army camp (now a holiday campsite) behind the Loch Ryan Hotel.

In 1957 and 1958, Cairnryan Lighterage Wharf and the port/jetty were again used in a joint Army/RAF operation called 'Operation Hardrock'. This operation was to build a rocket-tracking station on the remote island of St Kilda, serving the South Uist Missile Range, from where the 'MGM-5 Corporal' missiles were launched. The civil engineering work, involving an accommodation block and a winding road to the island's highest point, where the rocket-tracking building was built, was carried out by the RAF's 5004 Airfield Construction Squadron. Personnel, plant and other equipment was transported between the pier, Cairnryan and St. Kilda, using RASC Landing Craft Tanks, operated by 76 Squadron RASC, based at Portsmouth.

Military port activity ceased in the early 1960s, when the whole military infrastructure, such as the cranes and the railway line, were abandoned, then dismantled, apart from the pier and lighterage wharf themselves.

In the late 1960s, ship breaking became the main industry. The British aircraft carriers HMS Centaur, HMS Bulwark, HMS Eagle, and HMS Ark Royal were all sent for breaking up, as well as a number of other vessels, including HMS Mohawk and HMS Blake. The trawler Ross Revenge was awaiting scrapping in 1980, when the Radio Caroline organisation bought the ship for their new offshore radio station.

In July 1973, Townsend Thoresen started a "roll on, roll off" ferry service, from the Lighterage Wharf in Cairnryan, to Larne for passengers and cars, using the ship Ionic Ferry. Later, the service was extended to commercial vehicles. In 1987, Townsend Thoresen was rebranded P&O European Ferries after the 'Herald of Free Enterprise' disaster as P&O had just taken over the parent company European Ferries.

In 2011, Stena Line transferred its car ferry operation from Stranraer Harbour to one at Old House Point, just north of Cairnryan, operating to the Belfast Port.

== Harbour ==
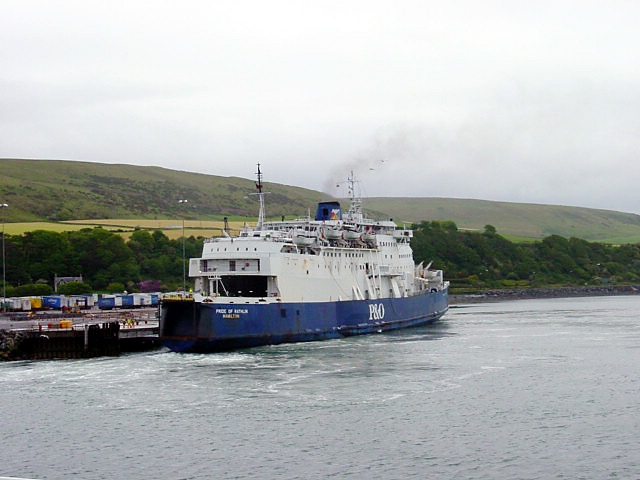
Ferry berthed at Cairnryan

Cairnryan has two ferry terminals connecting Scotland to Northern Ireland.

The first, at the south of Cairnryan, opened in 1973, originally operated by Townsend Thoresen and now by P&O Ferries, links Scotland with the port of Larne. Part of this terminal utilises Cairnryan Lighterage Wharf.

The second, the ex-British Rail/Sealink one, which was based at Stranraer Harbour, is now at Old House Point, just north of Cairnryan, opened in 2011 and is operated by Stena Line linking to the Port of Belfast in Belfast.

== Transport ==
A bus link operated by Wigtownshire Community Transport used to run between the P&O Ferries and Stena Line ferry terminals at Cairnryan and Stranraer. Stranraer railway station is approximately 15 minutes walk from the bus stop. However, by 2024, it has not run for a number of years. Now the bus service to Stranraer is run as part of the Stagecoach number 58/358 Girvan to Stranraer route.

Stena Line operate a coach service between the ferry terminal and Ayr railway station to connect with certain sailings to and from Belfast.

Preceding station	Ferry	Following station
	Ferry services	
Ayr (via coach link from Cairnryan)	Stena Line; Ferry	Port of Belfast (nearest stations York Street, Lanyon Place & Belfast Grand Central)
Stranraer Harbour (via bus link from Cairnryan)	P&O Ferries; Ferry	Larne Harbour
