= York Road railway station =

Former station in Belfast, Northern Ireland

Coordinates: 54.611078°N 5.921841°W

York Road
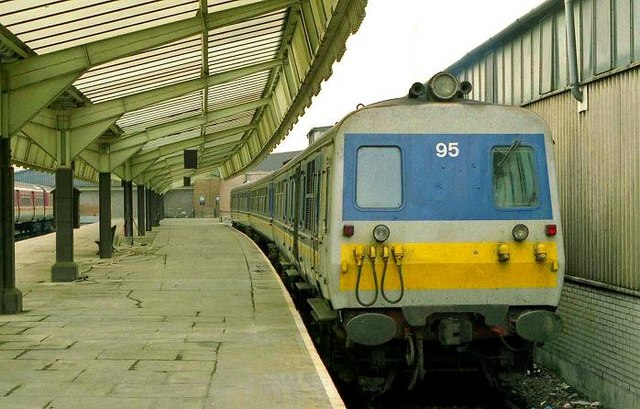
- NIR 80 Class train at York Road station in 1991

General information
- Location: Belfast, Belfast City; Northern Ireland
- Platforms: 3 at closure

Other information
- Status: Disused

History
- Post-grouping: Northern Ireland Railways

Key dates
- 1848: Station opened
- 1975: Station refurbished
- 1992: Station closed
Location

York Road railway station (also referred to as Belfast York Road) served the north of Belfast in Northern Ireland. It was formerly one of the three terminus railway stations in Belfast. The others were Great Victoria Street, and Queen's Quay.

== History ==
=== Early history ===
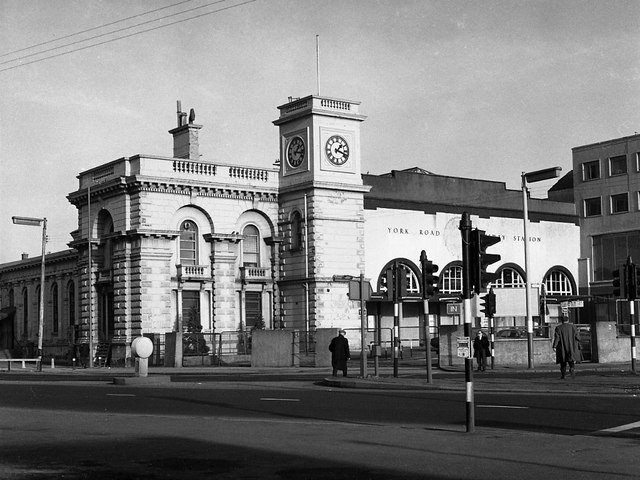
The original station buildings by Charles Lanyon

York Road station was opened on 11 April 1848 by the Belfast & Ballymena Railway. Originally, it acted as terminus for rail services between Belfast and Ballymena. Later this was extended to Derry Waterside by the Londonderry and Coleraine Railway via a route to Coleraine (opened in 1855 by the Ballymena, Ballymoney, Coleraine and Portrush Junction Railway). A branch was also opened to Carrickfergus (1848, BBR) and Larne (1862, Carrickfergus & Larne Railway).

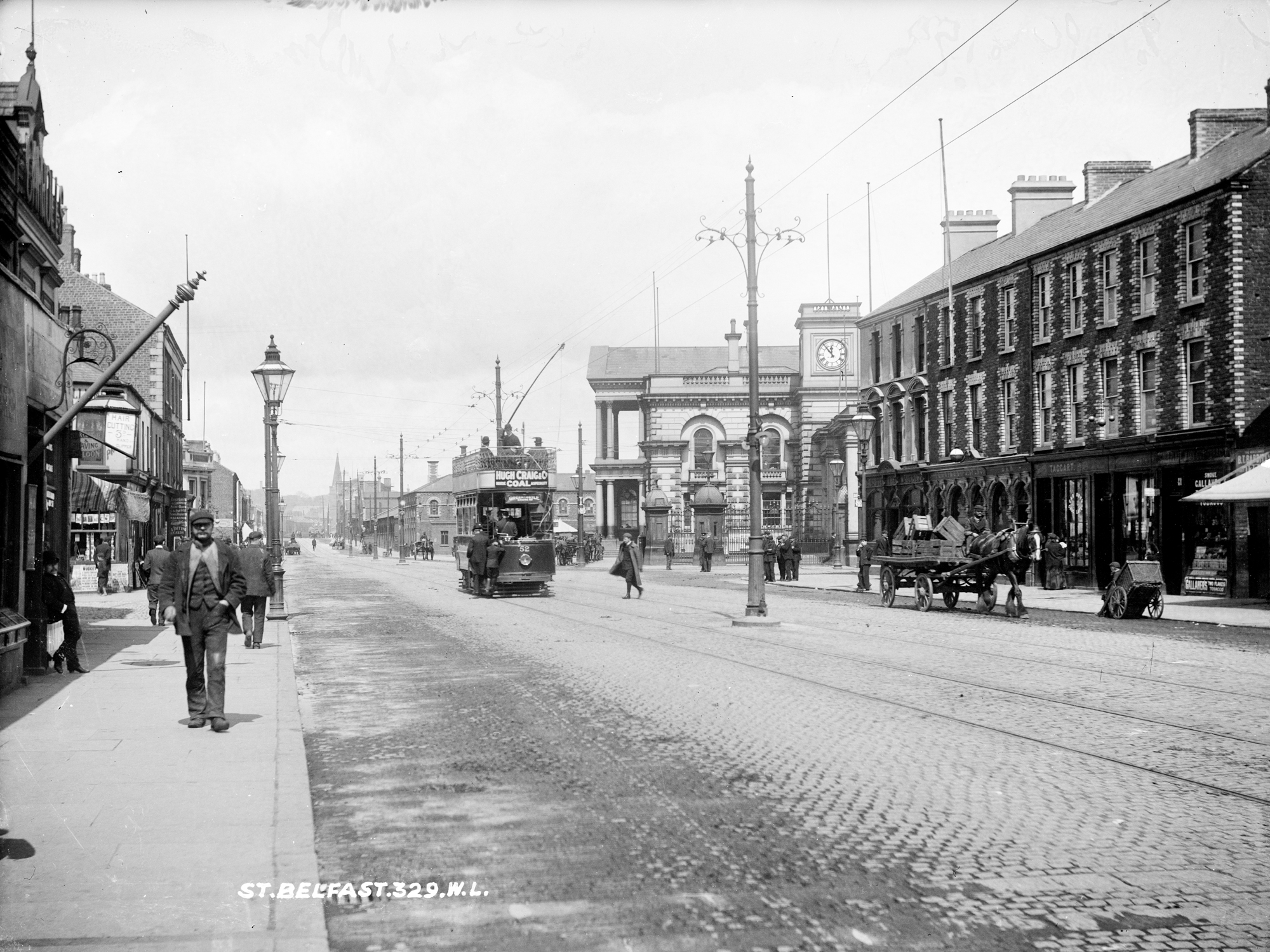
Circa 1907 with an electric tram run by Belfast Corporation Tramways outside York Road station.

The station building was initially a modest structure dating from 1848. The station roof was erected by Richard Turner, Dublin. The station was extended in 1873–1875, and again in the 1890s when the building work was under the control of Berkeley Deane Wise. The 1890s rebuilding resulted in the erection of the clock tower, concourse, tramway canopy, hotel, freight offices and goods store.

The company became known as the Belfast and Northern Counties Railway. It was taken over by the Midland Railway in 1903, becoming the "Midland Railway, Northern Counties Committee". After the grouping of 1923, it became the London, Midland and Scottish Railway, Northern Counties Committee. Following a very brief period, from 1 January 1948, in the ownership of the British Government's British Transport Commission as the "Railway Executive, Northern Counties Committee", the Ulster Transport Authority took over the "NCC" on 1 April 1949 and, during the 1950s, set about closing much of the network.

For a short time in the 1930s, some passenger services were run by the Northern Counties Committee, between York Road and Donegall Quay, where LMS steamers operated to Heysham. However, navigation through the Harbour Commissioner's lines in the docks was difficult. Trains had to proceed from the yard in Whitla Street, along Prince's Dock Street, then across the Clarendon Dock via a swing bridge, and then along both Albert and Donegall Quays. Coaches had to be specially adapted for this purpose. Wooden steps were provided to allow passengers to climb into the carriages from the paved area outside Donegall Quay's transit sheds.

Additionally, some rolling stock of limited height and length could proceed further past Donegall Quay and through a tunnel under the western end of the Queen's Bridge, known as the Queen's Bridge subway to Queen's Bridge goods station (now Oxford Street bus station). Until June 1963, this was the only available (if impractical) way of transferring rail vehicles through the city from York Road. This tunnel was closed in 1966 and converted into a pedestrian subway, thus completely isolating York Road from the rest of Belfast. The tunnel itself stayed open as a pedestrian subway until 2002 when it was demolished and its remnants used to carry cables.

=== Post-war history ===
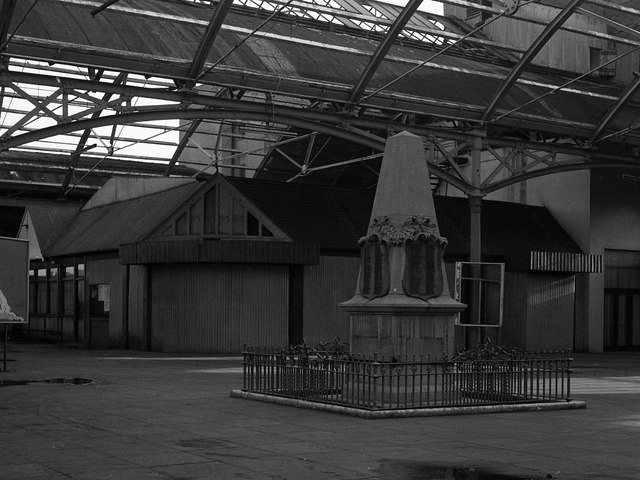
Interior view in 1975

The station and adjacent works were very badly damaged in an air raid, in April 1941. The Midland Hotel, on the Whitla Street side of the complex, was destroyed, along with the covered tram terminus next door. The two large overall semi-circular glass roofs which covered the platforms of York Road station at the concourse end were also destroyed. The damage was so severe that, in 1944, town planners proposed, in the first area plan for Belfast, that the entire station should be moved several blocks to the south, but this proposal was never implemented.

Although the hotel was re-built (in much-simplified form) and the station was revamped on two occasions (notably in 1966), it never regained its pre-war grandeur. A terrorist attack, in the early days of the Troubles, damaged it further. In 1968, the successor of the Ulster Transport Authority, Northern Ireland Railways drew up ambitious plans for a brand new station and office block at York Road, in a style similar to that employed for London's Euston station, which was remodelled between 1963 and 1968. These plans, copies of which were uncovered in 1999 by the Irish Railway Record Society, were soon shelved. Instead, what remained of the old station was demolished and a small, brown-brick structure built. This was opened in 1975, with the main entrance in York Road itself, at what had been the side of the old station. Parts of the site were sold at that time, and commercial premises were constructed.

=== Modern history ===
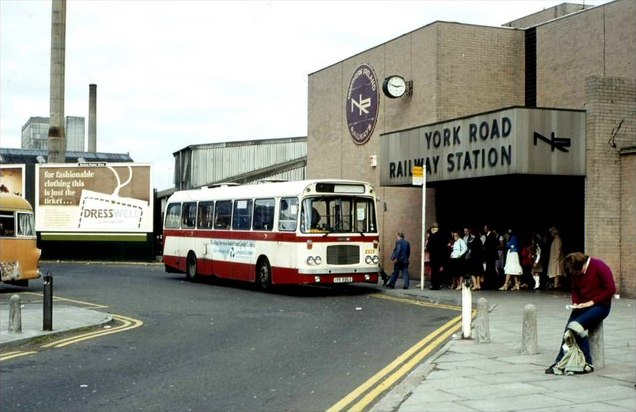
York Road station in 1983

Services to Derry/Londonderry and intermediate locations continued to run until 1978 when the Belfast terminus was transferred to Belfast Central station (now Belfast Lanyon Place), which had opened two years previously. Services on the Derry line were then run through a new spur that accessed the former Antrim branch of the GNRI via Lisburn, rendering the York Road-Antrim branch redundant.

With no direct rail link to the rest of the network in Belfast, York Road was relegated to being a fairly quiet terminus for services on the Larne line between 1978 and 1992, apart from some brief excursion trains, and a short resumption of York Road-Antrim stopping services in 1980.

The station was finally closed in 1992 in preparation for the construction of the Cross Harbour Rail Link connecting the Larne line to Belfast Central (Now Belfast Lanyon Place). It was replaced by the nearby Yorkgate station which served as a temporary terminus for the Larne line until the completion of the rail link over the Dargan Bridge when through services began to operate to Belfast Central (Now Belfast Lanyon Place). No traces of the station remain today, apart from the nearby maintenance depot, which is still in use.

Preceding station	Disused railways	Following station
Terminus	Belfast and Ballymena Railway; Belfast York Road-Ballymena	Greencastle
Terminus	Northern Ireland Railways; Belfast–Larne	Whiteabbey
Terminus	Northern Ireland Railways; Belfast–Derry (until 1978)	Whiteabbey
Terminus	Northern Ireland Railways; Belfast-Antrim (1980)	Whiteabbey
Terminus	Citybus; Rail Link bus service	Belfast Central
