= Mossley West railway station =

Railway station in Newtownabbey, Northern Ireland

Mossley West
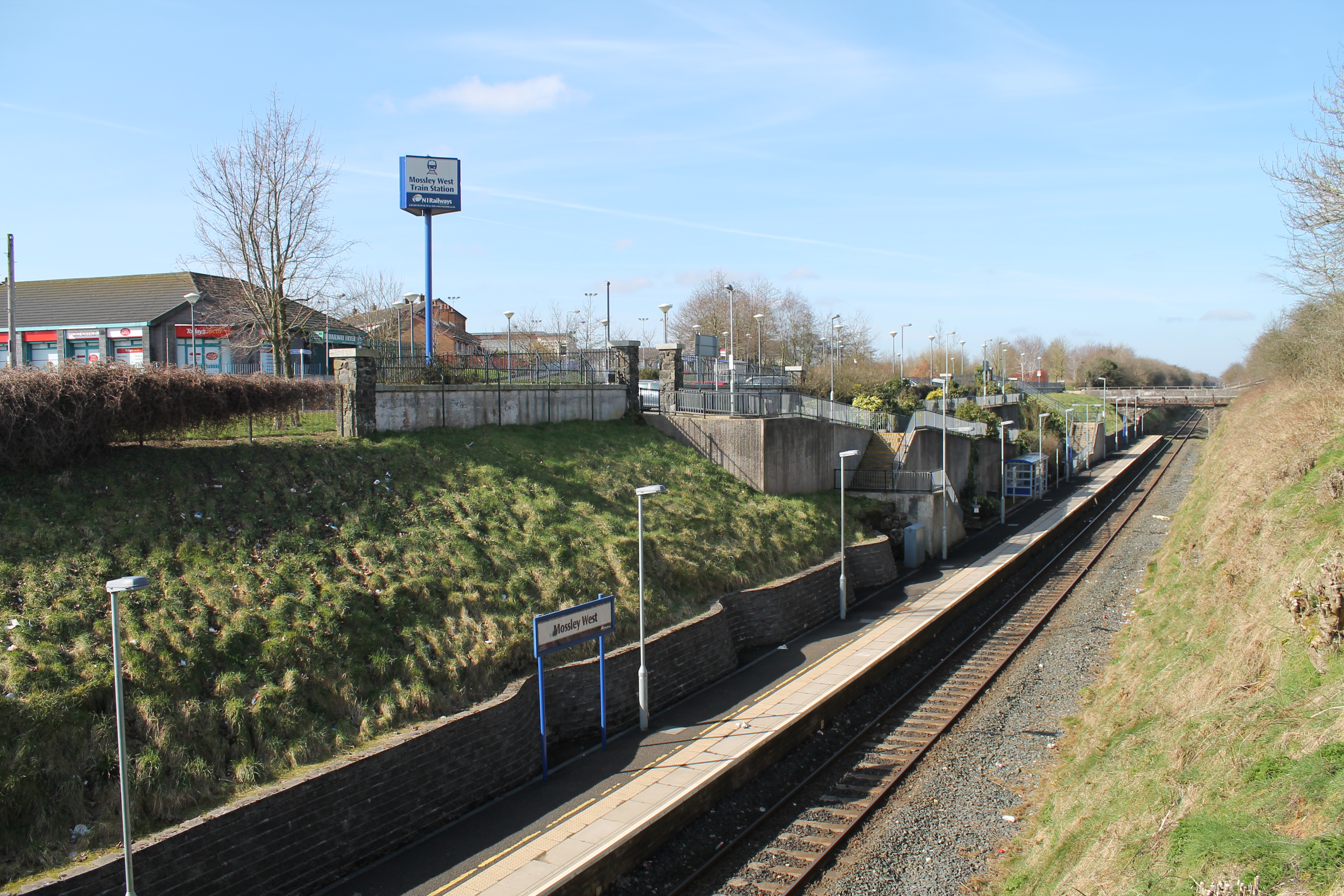
- The single platform at Mossley West station in 2015

General information
- Location: The Glade, Newtownabbey, BT36 5NN; County Antrim; Northern Ireland
- Coordinates: 54°41′46″N 5°57′5″W
- System: Commuter rail
- Owner: NI Railways
- Operator: NI Railways
- Line: Derry ~ Londonderry Line
- Platforms: 1
- Tracks: 1
- Train operators: Northern Ireland Railways
- Bus routes: 1D; 1K
- Bus stands: 1
- Bus operators: Translink Metro

Construction
- Structure type: At-grade
- Parking: 59 spaces (including 4 accessible spaces), 1 electric charging space and 65 overflow spaces at Mossley Hockey Club
- Cycle facilities: 2 spaces
- Accessible: yes

Other information
- Status: Operational
- Station code: MW
- Website: www.translink.co.uk

Key dates
- October 2001: Opened to passengers
- 2008: Accessibility improvements

Passengers
- 2022/23: 208,070
- 2023/24: ▲290,680
- 2024/25: ▲296,465
- 2025/26: ▲340,050

Services
Preceding station	NI Railways	Following station
Antrim towards Coleraine, Portrush or Derry~Londonderry	Derry ~ Londonderry Line	York Street towards Belfast Grand Central
Antrim towards Coleraine, Portrush or Derry~Londonderry	Derry ~ Londonderry Line Limited services	Whiteabbey towards Belfast Grand Central
Route map
(Click to expand)
Location
- Location within Northern Ireland Location within island of Ireland

Mossley West railway station is located in the townland of Ballyhenry, in the north of Newtownabbey, County Antrim, Northern Ireland. The station is operated by NI Railways, part of Translink.

During the late 2000s, Translink carried out a £17 million improvement programme across its railway stations and halts, intended to improve accessibility for passengers with disabilities. The programme was reported as completed in December 2009. Mossley West currently provides step-free access to its platform and a ramp for boarding trains.

Whiteabbey is situated between Mossley West and York Street on the Belfast–Derry railway line. However, only a limited number of services call at Whiteabbey, with most trains running directly between Mossley West and York Street. The stopping pattern varies according to the timetable.

== Service ==
=== Train Services ===
On Mondays to Saturdays, there is an hourly service to Belfast Grand Central. In the other direction there is an hourly service to Derry~Londonderry, with the last service terminating at Coleraine.

On Sundays, services alternate between Derry~Londonderry or Portrush and the last service terminating at Coleraine. In the other direction, there is an hourly service to Belfast Grand Central.

=== Bus Services ===
Translink's Metro 1D and 1K services operate along Metro Corridor 1, running from outside the station to Belfast city centre. On weekdays, buses arrive every 30 minutes, while on weekends they run hourly.
