= Dunadry railway station =

Railway station in County Antrim, Northern Ireland

Coordinates: 54.6957°N 6.1364°W

Dunadry

General information
- Location: Dunadry, County Antrim; Northern Ireland

Other information
- Status: Disused

History
- Original company: Belfast and Ballymena Railway
- Pre-grouping: Belfast and Northern Counties Railway
- Post-grouping: Ulster Transport Authority

Key dates
- 11 April 1848: Station opens
- 20 September 1954: Station closes

Dunadry railway station served the hamlet of Dunadry and was on the Belfast and Ballymena Railway which ran from Belfast to Ballymena in Northern Ireland.

== History ==
The station was opened by the Belfast and Ballymena Railway on 11 April 1848.

The station closed to passengers on 20 September 1954.

In mid-2008, the remains of the railway station were turned into a housing development called ‘The Old Station’.

Preceding station	NI Railways	Following station
Templepatrick	Ulster Transport Authority; Belfast-Derry	Muckamore
	Historical railways	
Templepatrick; Line open, station closed	Belfast and Ballymena Railway; Belfast-Ballymena	Muckamore; Line open, station closed
