= Lanyon Place railway station =

Station in Belfast, Northern Ireland

Lanyon Place
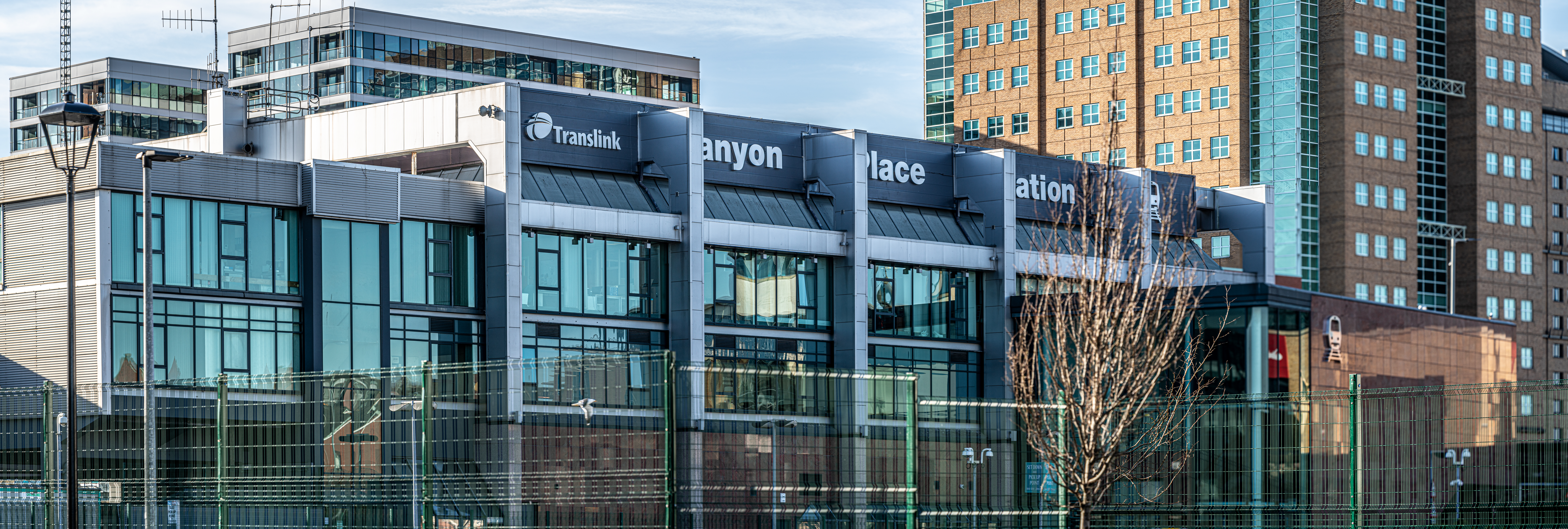
- Station Building

General information
- Other names: Belfast Central
- Location: East Bridge Street, Belfast; Northern Ireland
- Coordinates: 54.5953°N 5.9172°W
- Owner: NI Railways
- Operator: NI Railways
- Lines: Bangor Line; Derry ~ Londonderry Line; Larne Line
- Platforms: 4
- Tracks: 4 (at platforms); 5 (total)

Construction
- Structure type: At-grade

Other information
- Station code: CL

Key dates
- 1976: Opened as Belfast Central
- 2003: Refurbished
- 2018: Renamed "Lanyon Place"

Passengers
- 2015/16: 2.232 million
- 2016/17: ▼2.282 million
- 2017/18: ▲2.424 million
- 2018/19: ▲2.615 million
- 2019/20: ▼2.569 million
- 2020/21: ▼359,100
- 2021/22: ▲980,707
- 2022/23: ▲1.833 million
- 2023/24: ▲2.417 million
- 2024/25: ▲3.413 million
- 2025/26: ▼2.003 million

Services
Preceding station	NI Railways	Following station
Titanic Quarter towards Bangor	Bangor Line	Botanic towards Belfast Grand Central
York Street towards Carrickfergus, Whitehead, Larne Town or Larne Harbour	Larne Line	Botanic towards Belfast Grand Central
York Street towards Coleraine, Portrush or Derry~Londonderry	Derry ~ Londonderry Line	Botanic towards Belfast Grand Central

Historical railways
Preceding station	Historical railways	Following station
Bridge End; Line and station open	NI Railways; Belfast–Bangor (1977–2012)	Botanic; Line and station open
Yorkgate; Station closed	NI Railways; Belfast–Larne / Belfast–Derry (1994–2024)	Botanic; Line and station open
Terminus	Enterprise; Belfast–Dublin	Portadown; Line and station open
Terminus	Enterprise; Belfast–Dublin (Selected historical services before 1995)	Botanic; Line and station open
Terminus	Enterprise; Belfast–Dublin (Selected services)	Lisburn; Line and station open
- NI Railways; Translink; NI railway stations
Route map
Location
- Location within Northern Ireland Location within island of Ireland

Belfast Lanyon Place (formerly Belfast Central) is a railway station serving the city of Belfast in Northern Ireland. Located on East Bridge Street in the Laganside area of central Belfast, it is one of four stations in the city centre, the others being City Hospital, Botanic, and Belfast Grand Central.

The station serves Northern Ireland Railways routes to Derry, Bangor and Larne. Until 2024, Lanyon Place was also the northern terminus of the cross-border Enterprise service to Dublin Connolly, jointly run with Iarnród Éireann.

== Description ==
There are two island platforms at Lanyon Place, each serving two tracks, capable of accommodating trains up to nine coaches long on each side. Platform 1 is usually only used at peak hours, as well as for special services run by the Railway Preservation Society of Ireland. Platform 2 was the Enterprise platform. Platform 3 is the 'southbound platform', normally used for trains to Botanic, City Hospital and Belfast Grand Central with Platform 4 being the 'northbound platform' for trains along the Derry, Larne and Bangor lines.

2.6 million people used the station in 2017.

== History ==
The station was opened as "Belfast Central" on Monday, 12 April 1976 for Bangor bound traffic and Lisburn and Portadown services commenced on Monday, 26 April, despite it being located further from Belfast city centre than Great Victoria Street station. The first station manager was Mr John Johnston. Great Victoria Street and Queen's Quay stations were closed upon the opening of Belfast Central (a new station was built at Great Victoria Street and opened in 1995).

By the 1990s, it became clear that the station's facilities were in need of upgrading. A major refurbishment programme started in 2000 and was completed in 2003.

In February 2018, Translink announced that Belfast Central would undergo a face-lift. This would see the entrance hall and East Bridge Street façade completely redesigned, with the removal of a blast wall from The Troubles era. Inside, the ticket hall would be rebuilt and new retail and dining facilities provided. A Belfast Bikes dock will also be included in the redesigned station.

As part of the redesign, Belfast Central was renamed Lanyon Place on 1 September 2018. This is despite the fact that, strictly speaking, the station is not located there but on East Bridge Street.

The Enterprise train served Lanyon Place for the final time on 2 July 2024. Bus substitution services continued from Lanyon Place until 12 October 2024. On 13 October 2024, the service was transferred to the new Belfast Grand Central Station integrated transport hub.

== Current service ==
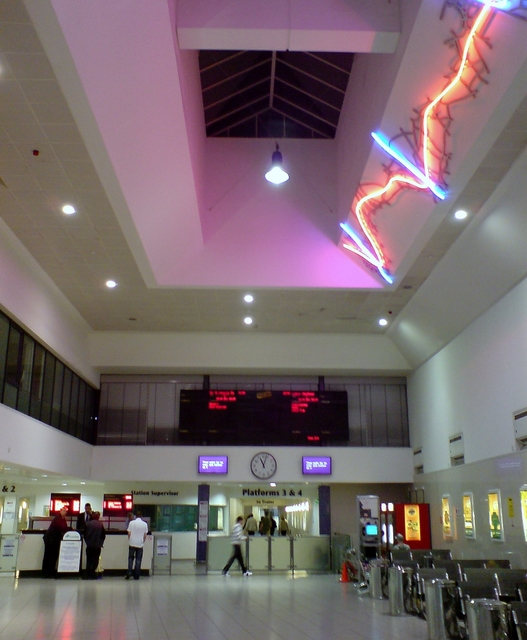
Main hall of Belfast Central (prior to refurbishment as Lanyon Place)

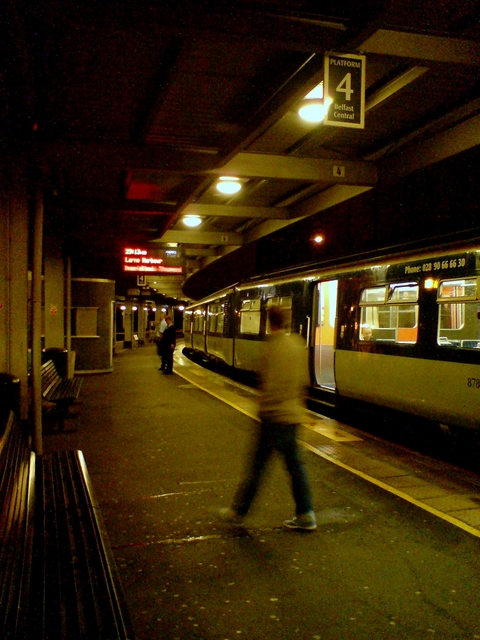
Train departing from Lanyon Place

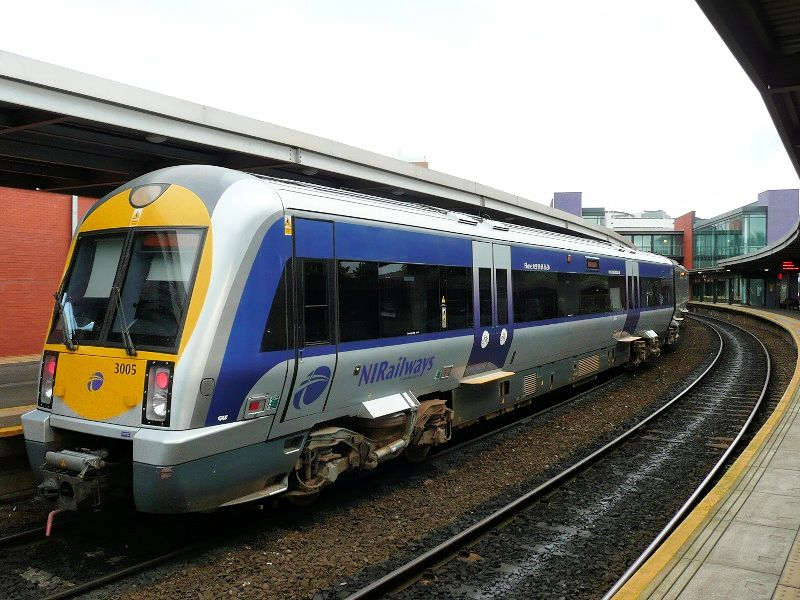
NIR Class 3000 (C3K) train in Lanyon Place

=== Bangor line ===
From Monday to Saturday, there is a half hourly service from Lanyon Place to Bangor in one direction, and to Grand Central in the other. During peak times there are up to 6 trains per hour operating to Bangor with 3 being express services and the other half being slow services stopping at all stations between here and Bangor. The service is reduced to hourly operation in the evenings.

On Sundays, the service reduces to hourly operation between Bangor and Grand Central.

=== Larne line ===
Outbound services run half-hourly on an alternating basis to either Whitehead or through to Larne Harbour, giving an hourly service to stations beyond Whitehead. Extra services at peak times run to Carrickfergus and Larne Town. Almost all inbound services operate to Grand Central, with some peak time trains terminating here.

Saturdays retain a very similar pattern to the weekday service, minus any additional peak-time trains. On Sundays, the service reduces to hourly operation, with the outbound terminus alternating between Whitehead and Larne Harbour as before, giving a two-hourly service to stations beyond Whitehead. All inbound services operate to Grand Central.

=== Derry~Londonderry line ===
All Derry~Londonderry Line trains call at Lanyon Place. During the week, the service runs hourly in each direction between Grand Central and Derry~Londonderry. Certain peak-time or late-night trains will only run as far as Coleraine, or through to Portrush along the Coleraine-Portrush railway line.

On Saturdays, the service is slightly reduced, however operation remains much the same as during the week. On Sundays, the hourly service alternately runs to Derry~Londonderry and Portrush, giving a two-hourly service to stations beyond Coleraine.

== Former services ==
=== Dublin line/ Newry Line ===
Until 2024, the Enterprise service operated from Lanyon Place to Dublin Connolly every two hours. This reduced to five services per day on Sundays. The Enterprise served Lanyon Place for the final time on 2 July 2024, with the line south of Lanyon Place closing for track maintenance the following day. The Enterprise began to operate from Grand Central station on 13 October 2024 along with the Portadown to Bangor line.
