= Carrickfergus railway station =

Railway station in Northern Ireland

Carrickfergus
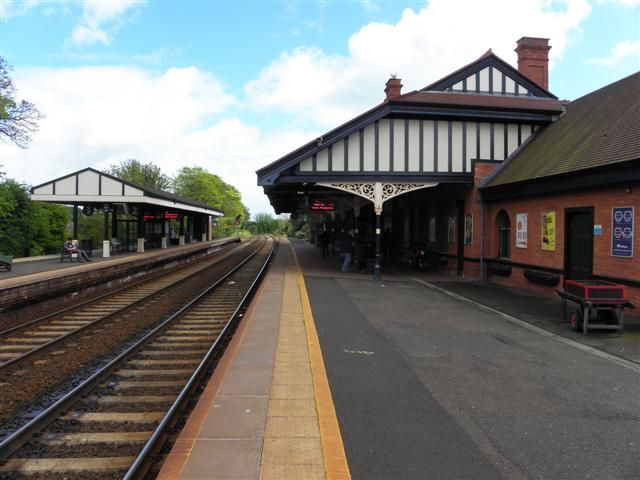
- Platform 1 at Carrickfergus station in 2011.

General information
- Location: Victoria Street, Carrickfergus; County Antrim; Northern Ireland
- Coordinates: 54.717422°N 5.809689°W
- Owner: NI Railways
- Operator: NI Railways
- Line: Larne
- Platforms: 3

Construction
- Structure type: At-grade

Other information
- Station code: CS

Key dates
- 1862: Station opened
- 2001: Station refurbished

Passengers
- 2022/23: 484,439
- 2023/24: ▲624,242
- 2024/25: ▲636,231
- 2025/26: ▲714,697
- NI Railways; Translink; NI railway stations
Route map
(Click to expand)
Location
- Location within Northern Ireland Location within island of Ireland

Carrickfergus railway station serves the centre of Carrickfergus in County Antrim, Northern Ireland. In addition to this, Clipperstown serves the west of the town, and Downshire the east.

== History ==
The station opened on 1 October 1862.

== Service ==
On Mondays to Fridays, there is a half-hourly service to Belfast Grand Central with extra trains at peak times. In the other direction, there is a half-hourly service with the terminus alternating between Whitehead and Larne Harbour. Some peak time trains terminate here, at platform 3, and other peak trains continue to Larne Town.

On Saturdays, the service remains half-hourly, with fewer trains at peak times.

On Sundays, the service reduces to hourly operation in both directions.

Preceding station	NI Railways	Following station
Clipperstown	Northern Ireland Railways; Belfast–Larne line	Downshire
	Historical railways	
Clipperstown; Line and station open	Northern Counties Committee; Belfast-Larne	Barn; Line open, station closed
