= Larne Harbour railway station =

Railway station in Northern Ireland

Larne Harbour
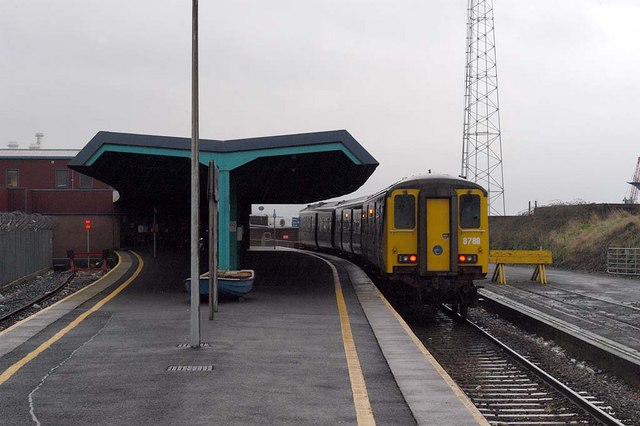

General information
- Other names: Port of Larne Train Station
- Location: Larne Harbour; Larne; County Antrim; BT40 1AJ; Northern Ireland
- Coordinates: 54°50′53″N 5°47′55″W
- System: Terminus Commuter Railway Station
- Owner: NI Railways
- Operator: NI Railways
- Line: Larne
- Platforms: 2
- Tracks: 3

Construction
- Structure type: At-grade
- Parking: 250 spaces

Other information
- Station code: LR
- Fare zone: 3
- Website: translink.co.uk

History
- Electrified: Un-electrified

Key dates
- 1862: Original station opened
- 1965: Goods traffic ceased
- 1985: Current station opened
- 2012: Platforms extended

Passengers
- 2022/23: 16,447
- 2023/24: ▲24,303
- 2024/25: ▲27,191
- 2025/26: ▼26,173
- NI Railways; Translink; NI railway stations
Route map
(Click to expand)
Location
- Location within Northern Ireland Location within island of Ireland

Larne Harbour railway station, Larne, County Antrim, Northern Ireland, serves the ferry port for ferries to Cairnryan. There are also occasional sailings to Douglas, Isle of Man for the Isle of Man TT. Sailings to Cairnryan are operated by conventional ships; there are several crossings a day throughout the year.

The station is adjacent to the passenger terminus for P&O Ferries, conveniently for foot passengers. (This situation is not the case at the Scottish ferry terminal of Cairnryan, where the nearest railway station, Stranraer Harbour, is five miles (8 km) away.)

== Early history ==
The station was opened on 1 October 1862. It was improved in 1890 by Berkeley Deane Wise to a budget of £3,000 (equivalent to £330,000 in 2025), with a double faced platform, one side serving the broad gauge line from Belfast and the other the narrow gauge from Ballymena, and a clock with two minute hands showing both English and Irish time, which was 25 minutes later.

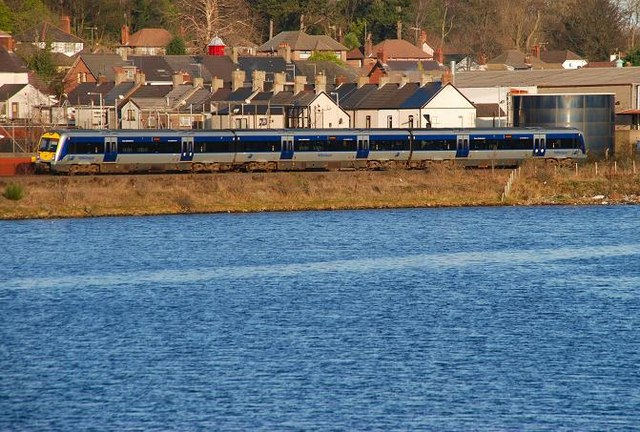
A C3K train running on the Larne Line alongside Larne Lough heading towards Larne Harbour.

== Service ==
This station is the final outbound terminus for services on the Larne Line.

On Mondays to Saturdays there is an hourly service to Belfast Grand Central with extra services at peak times. Some of those peak services start and terminate at the nearby Larne Town station instead. On weekdays the first train leaves here at 6:05 am and the last train arrives at 12:20 am.

On Sundays the service to Belfast Grand Central reduces to operating every two hours.

Preceding station	NI Railways	Following station
Larne Town	Northern Ireland Railways; Belfast–Larne	Terminus
	Ferry services	
Terminus	P&O Ferries; Larne–Cairnryan	Stranraer Harbour or Girvan (via bus link from Cairnryan)
Terminus	Isle of Man Steam Packet Company; Larne–Douglas	Douglas
	Historical railways	
Larne; Line re-aligned, station closed	Northern Counties Committee; Belfast–Larne	Terminus
Larne; Line and station closed	Ballymena and Larne Railway; Ballymena–Larne	Terminus
