= Portrush railway station =

Station in County Antrim, Northern Ireland

Portrush
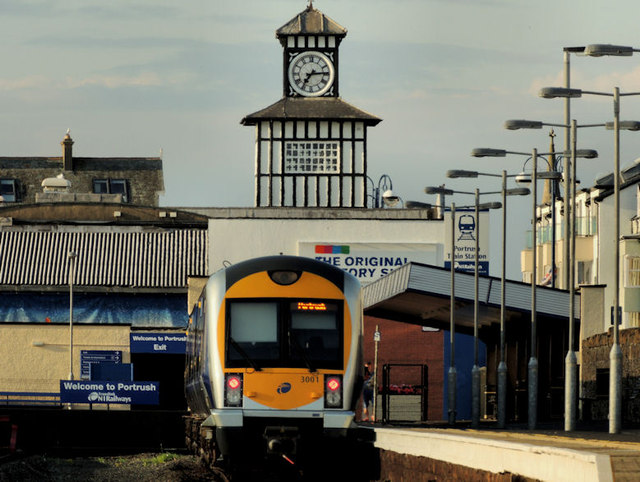
- NIR Class 3000 train at Portrush in 2012

General information
- Location: Eglinton Street, Portrush, BT56 8DZ; County Antrim; Northern Ireland
- Coordinates: 55.202554°N 6.653696°W
- Owner: NI Railways
- Operator: NI Railways
- Line: Coleraine–Portrush
- Platforms: 3
- Tracks: 3

Construction
- Structure type: At-grade
- Parking: No
- Accessible: Step-free access, boarding ramps and accessible toilet facilities
- Architect: Berkeley Deane Wise (1893); Gregory Architects (2018)

Other information
- Station code: PH
- Fare zone: iLink Zone 4 & North West
- Website: translink.co.uk/Portrush

History
- Rebuilt: 1893, 2019
- Original company: Ballymena, Ballymoney, Coleraine and Portrush Junction Railway
- Pre-grouping: Belfast and Northern Counties Railway
- Post-grouping: Northern Counties Committee

Key dates
- 4 December 1855: Opened
- 1893: Rebuilt and enlarged
- 1954: Goods traffic ceased
- 2008: Refurbished
- 2018: Redevelopment commenced
- 25 June 2019: Redeveloped station officially opened

Passengers
- 2022/23: 517,659
- 2023/24: ▲568,569
- 2024/25: ▼533,307
- 2025/26: ▲662,615

Services
| Preceding station | NI Railways | Following station |
|---|---|---|
| Terminus | Coleraine–Portrush railway line | Dhu Varren towards Coleraine or Belfast Grand Central |

Historical railway lines
| Preceding station | Historical railways | Following station |
|---|---|---|
| Terminus | Ballymena, Ballymoney, Coleraine and Portrush Junction Railway; Ballymena–Portrush | Portstewart |
- NI Railways; Translink; NI railway stations
Route map
(Click to expand)
Location
- Location within Northern Ireland Location within island of Ireland

Portrush railway station is the terminus of the Coleraine-Portrush railway line and serves the seaside town of Portrush, County Antrim, Northern Ireland.

== History ==
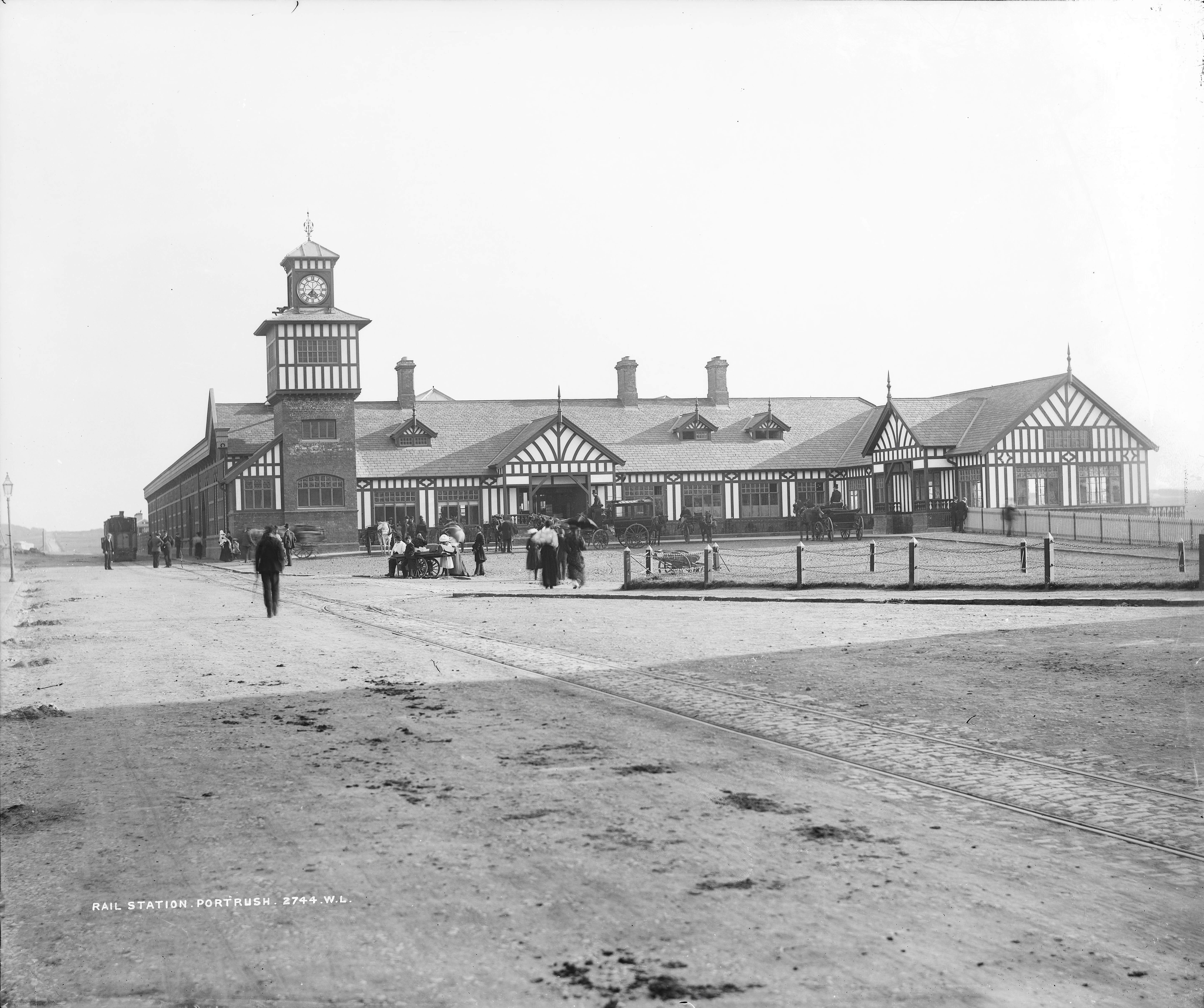
The station in the 1890s, with tramway in foreground

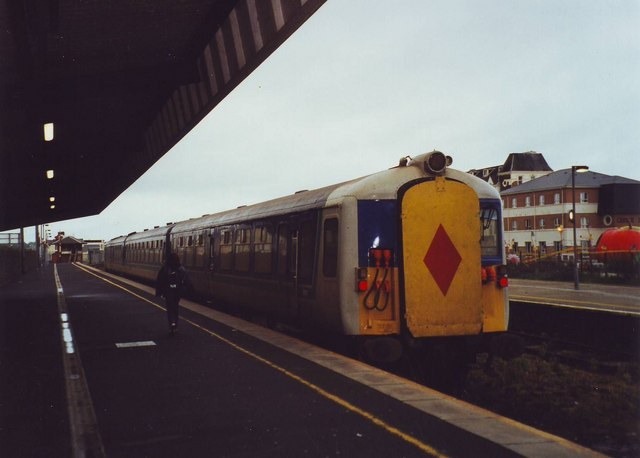
NIR Class 80 train at Portrush in 2000

The station, which is 67¾ miles from Belfast, was opened on 4 December 1855 by the Ballymena, Ballymoney, Coleraine and Portrush Junction Railway. To accommodate excursion and holiday traffic, extensive reconstruction by the Belfast and Northern Counties Railway, under the direction of its engineer and architect Berkeley Deane Wise, was completed in 1893. Three platforms were provided (only one is now in regular use) together with a train shed (demolished) and a station building in a "half-timbered" Mock Tudor style with a clock tower, described by Currie as "certainly one of the most handsome railway buildings in Ireland"; it is now occupied by a retail unit, with a small newer concrete block ticket office behind it serving as the current station building. Goods traffic to the station ceased on 20 September 1954.

The large 1892 grandfather clock from the station was returned to Portrush in 2007 and is displayed in Barry's Amusements complex adjacent to the station. Other survivals from the past are some semaphore signals (of the "somersault" type) and an early water tank.

Formerly the railway owned the Northern Counties Hotel, the largest visitor accommodation in the town. The Giant's Causeway Tramway began in Eglinton Street alongside the station.

A single branch line was built from the station to Portrush harbour in 1866. It closed in 1949. Part of this line is now a pedestrian walkway; a footbridge has replaced the railway's former harbour bridge.

== Modernisation ==
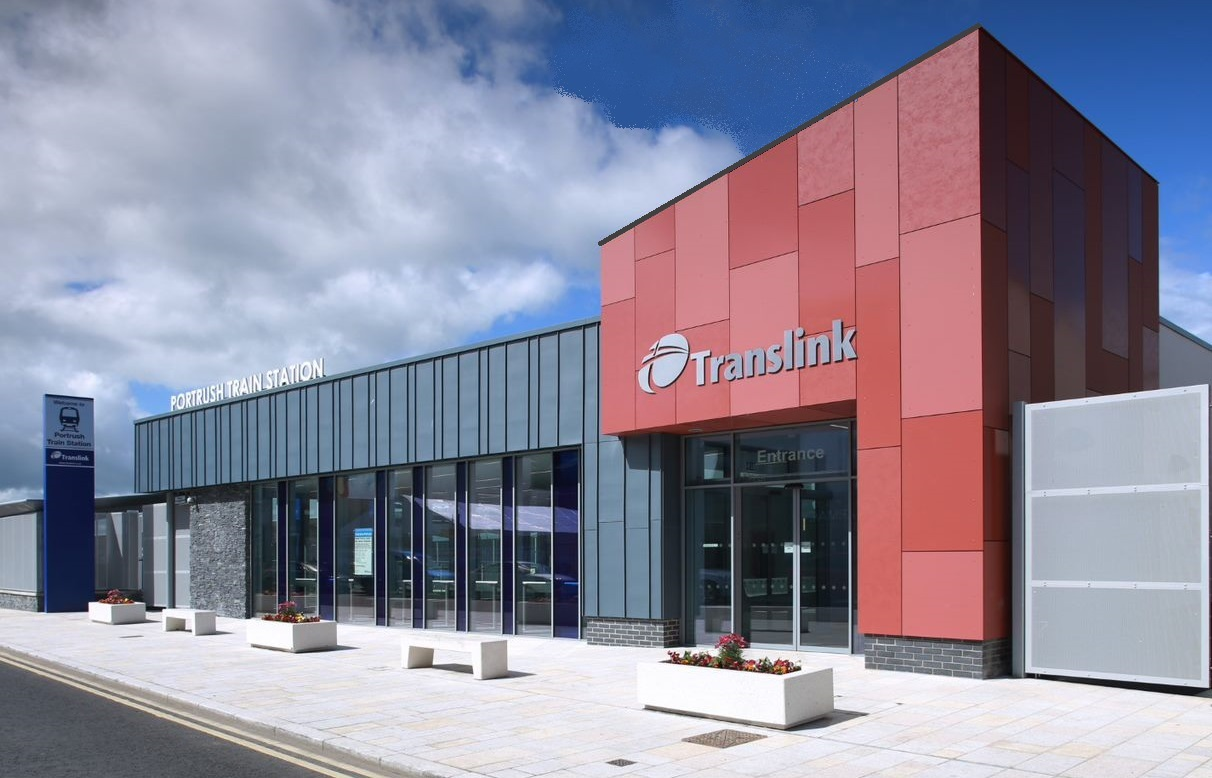
Refurbished Portrush Train station in 2019

In 2018, Graham Construction was appointed as the Principal Contractor to carry out development works to Portrush Station. This formed part of a wider £17 million investment to regenerate Portrush town ahead of The Open golf championship.

The works involved demolition of the existing ticket office in order to replace it with a larger, station building complete with concourse waiting area, staff rooms and public toilets. The platforms were extended to improve and increase commuter access. New steel canopies have been installed to Platform 1 and to central Platforms 2 and 3. The old masonry walls on Eglinton Street were replaced with newly constructed, stone-clad walls and artistic metalwork. Works to the new station commenced in April 2018 and were completed in Spring/Summer 2019 in time for The Open in July 2019.

== Service ==
Monday to Friday, first 2 trains from Portrush are through trains to Belfast Grand Central. The rest of the day, an hourly service operates to Coleraine.

On Saturdays, the first train from Portrush is a through train to Belfast Grand Central. The rest of the day, an hourly service operates to Coleraine railway station.

On Sundays, there is an hourly service to Coleraine railway station, with the service extending to Belfast Grand Central every two hours.

Monday to Sunday, all passengers for Castlerock, Bellarena and Derry~Londonderry railway station must change at Coleraine.

Ulsterbus services connect Portrush to nearby Portstewart and Bushmills.
