= Ballyclare Junction railway station =

Railway station in County Antrim, Northern Ireland

Ballyclare Junction
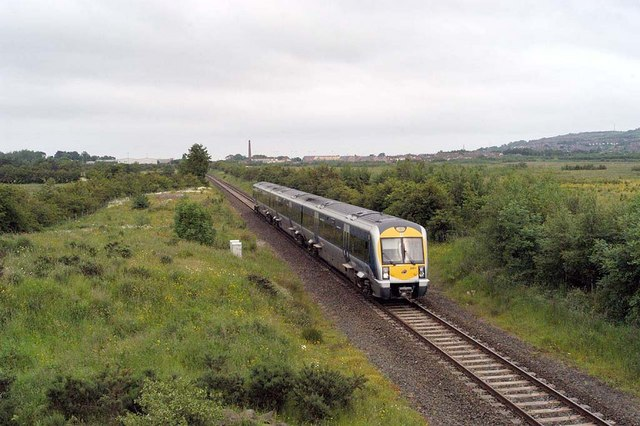
- NIR Class 3000 train passing the site of Ballyclare Junction station in 2005

General information
- Location: Ballyclare, County Antrim; Northern Ireland
- Coordinates: 54.6995°N 5.9685°W

Other information
- Status: Disused

History
- Original company: Belfast and Ballymena Railway
- Pre-grouping: Belfast and Northern Counties Railway
- Post-grouping: Ulster Transport Authority

Key dates
- 1 February 1849: Station opens as Ballynure
- 1 October 1858: Station renamed to Ballynure Road
- 1 September 1875: Station closed
- 1 June 1877: Station reopened
- 3 November 1884: Station renamed to Ballyclare Junction
- 9 September 1961: Station closes
Location

Ballyclare Junction railway station was on the Belfast and Ballymena Railway which ran from Belfast to Ballymena in Northern Ireland. Despite the name, the physical junction for the branch line to Ballyclare was located a short distance along the line in the Antrim direction, at Kingsbog Junction.

== History ==
The station was opened as Ballynure Road by the Belfast and Ballymena Railway on 1 February 1849. It was renamed Ballyclare Junction on 3 November 1884.

The station closed to passengers on 4 December 1961.

Preceding station	NI Railways	Following station
Mossley	Ulster Transport Authority; Belfast-Derry	Doagh
	Historical railways	
Mossley; Line open, station closed	Belfast and Ballymena Railway; Belfast-Ballymena	Ballyrobert; Line open, station closed
