= Doagh railway station (Belfast and Ballymena Railway) =

Railway station in County Antrim, Northern Ireland

Doagh
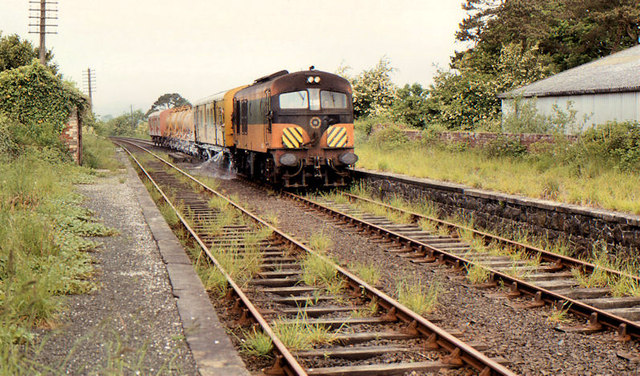
- CIE weed-spraying train passing the remains of Doagh station in 1983

General information
- Location: Doagh, County Antrim; Northern Ireland
- Coordinates: 54.737702°N 6.037959°W

Other information
- Status: Disused

History
- Original company: Belfast and Ballymena Railway
- Pre-grouping: Belfast and Northern Counties Railway
- Post-grouping: Northern Ireland Railways

Key dates
- 11 April 1848: Station opens
- October 1858: Station renamed Ballyclare and Doagh
- 3 November 1884: Station renamed Doagh
- 29 June 1970: Station closes
Location

Doagh railway station served the village of Doagh in County Antrim, Northern Ireland.

== History ==
The station was opened by the Belfast and Ballymena Railway on 11 April 1848.

The station was located to the rear of the current freemasons hall and accessed via ballyclare, by the end of its life, was served by very few trains. The station closed to passengers on 29 June 1970.

Preceding station	NI Railways	Following station
Mossley	Northern Ireland Railways; Belfast-Derry	Templepatrick
	Historical railways	
Ballyrobert; Line open, station closed	Belfast and Ballymena Railway; Belfast-Ballymena	Templepatrick; Line open, station closed
