= Ballyrobert railway station =

Railway station in County Antrim, Northern Ireland

Coordinates: 54.70820°N 5.99967°W

Ballyrobert

General information
- Location: Ballyrobert, County Antrim; Northern Ireland

Other information
- Status: Disused

History
- Original company: Belfast and Northern Counties Railway
- Pre-grouping: Northern Counties Committee

Key dates
- 1 July 1905: Station opens
- 1 June 1920: Station closes

Ballyrobert railway station served the village of Ballyrobert in County Antrim, Northern Ireland.

== History ==
The station was opened by the Belfast and Ballymena Railway on 1 July 1905.

The station was comparatively short-lived, and closed to passengers on 1 June 1920.

Preceding station	Historical railways	Following station
Ballyclare Junction; Line open, station closed	Belfast and Ballymena Railway; Belfast-Ballymena	Doagh; Line open, station closed
