= Monkstown railway station (Northern Ireland) =

Railway station in County Antrim, Northern Ireland

Monkstown
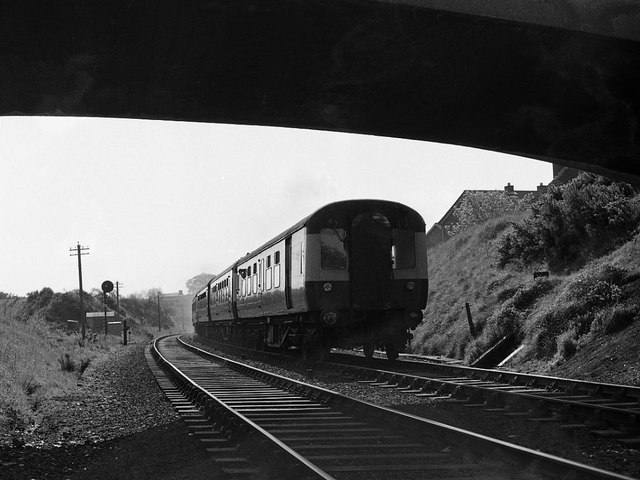
- Train at Monkstown station (1975)

General information
- Location: Monkstown, County Antrim; Northern Ireland
- Coordinates: 54.693412°N 5.917965°W
- Platforms: 2

Other information
- Status: Disused

History
- Original company: Belfast and Northern Counties Railway
- Pre-grouping: Belfast and Northern Counties Railway
- Post-grouping: Northern Ireland Railways

Key dates
- 1 July 1905: Station opens
- 21 February 1981: Station closes
Location

Monkstown railway station (also known as Monkstown Halt) served the village of Monkstown in County Antrim, Northern Ireland.

== History ==
The station was opened by the Belfast and Northern Counties Railway on 1 July 1905.

It closed along with the rest of the Bleach Green-Antrim line in 1978, but re-opened again for a short period in 1980 when York Road-Antrim stopping services were resumed. The station closed to passengers on 21 February 1981 when the line was once again mothballed. The line has since re-opened in 2001, however Monkstown station has remained closed.

Preceding station	NI Railways	Following station
Whiteabbey	Northern Ireland Railways; Belfast-Derry	Mossley
	Disused railways	
Greenisland	Ulster Transport Authority; Belfast/Larne-Derry via Greenisland	Mossley
	Historical railways	
Whiteabbey	Belfast and Ballymena Railway; Belfast York Road-Ballymena	Mossley
