= CxK =

Family of multiple unit trains produced by CAF

CxK (train)
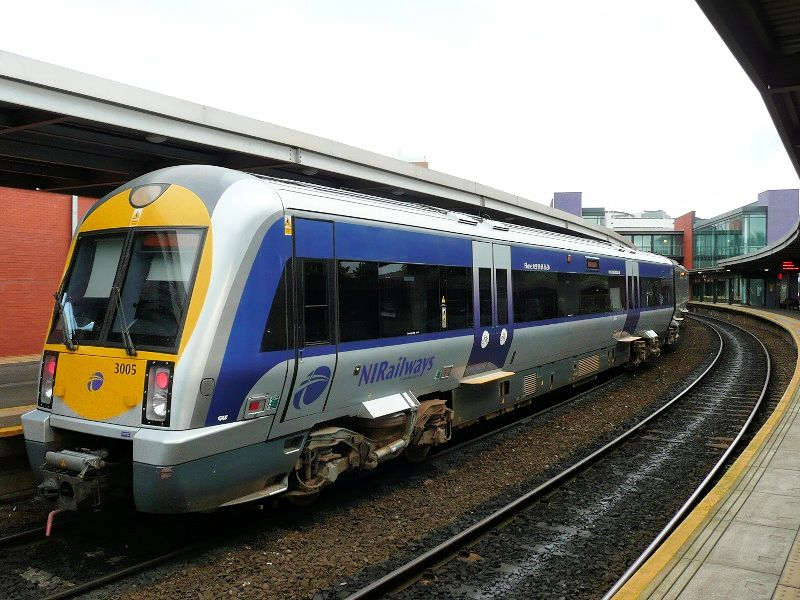
- A Class 3000 at Belfast Lanyon Place.
- In service: 2003–present
- Manufacturer: CAF
- Number built: DMU: 72 units; EMU: 95 units
- Operators: NI Railways; Iarnród Éireann; Auckland One Rail

Specifications
- Maximum speed: DMU: 120–145 km/h (75–90 mph); EMU: 110 km/h (68 mph)
- Electric system: EMU: 25 kV 50 Hz AC
- Track gauge: DMU: 1,600 mm (5 ft 3 in); EMU: 1,067 mm (3 ft 6 in)

CxK is an unofficial name given to a family of multiple unit trains produced by CAF for Ireland and Auckland. There are four types in operation, and they are the main suburban and commuter trains in Ireland. The name derives from NI Railways "C3K" and "C4K" classes.

== Northern Ireland ==
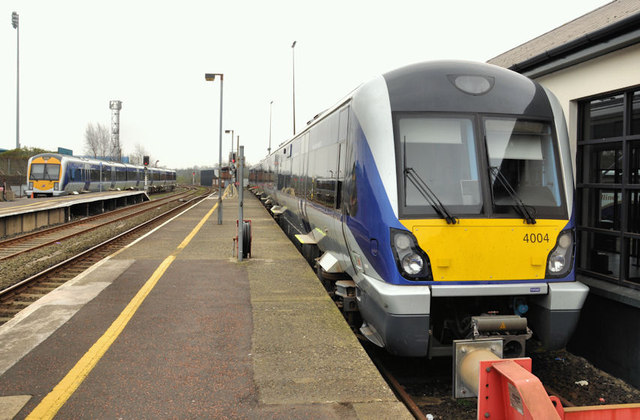
A C4K unit at Coleraine, with a C3K unit in the background

NI Railways, the state-owned rail operator in Northern Ireland, has fully replaced its fleet of DEMUs with CxK types.

=== Class 3000 ===
The Class 3000 was the first new train type purchased by NIR for two decades, to replace the increasingly obsolete NIR Class 80 units that had been in service since the mid-1970s. The £80m order, the largest in NIR's history at that point, was signed in 2002, with the first unit delivered in 2004. The 23 three-car units enabled NIR to withdraw most Class 80 units. It is the main passenger train type in Northern Ireland, and operates on most routes. The first six units have CAWS to allow operation in the Republic of Ireland.

=== Class 4000 ===
The Class 4000 is a follow-on from the C3K. Purchased in 2009, with the first unit delivered in 2011, the 20 three-car units replaced the 13 remaining Class 80 and Class 450 sets, allowing for major service enhancements. NI Railways has an option to purchase 20 trailers to lengthen these units. In 2018, NI Railways announced a £66million order to purchase 21 new intermediate coaches to lengthen 7 of their Class 4000 units from 3 to 6 cars to help relieve capacity constraints on the Derry/Londonderry and Portadown Lines. The first 3 carriages arrived in March 2021, with all units entering service by January 2022.

== Republic of Ireland ==
=== 29000 Class ===
The 29000 Class is the primary commuter train type operated by Iarnród Éireann, the state rail operator in the Republic of Ireland. Originally Class 2900, they are four-car units primarily used on commuter services around Dublin. The first batch of 20 units was delivered in 2002–2003, a further nine in 2005.

== New Zealand ==
=== AM class ===
The 72 Auckland three-car AM class EMUs carry 373 passengers, and were delivered in three batches, the first batch over 2013-2015, the second batch over 2019-2020, and the third batch over 2024-2026.

The third batch of 23 EMUs are currently being introduced into service. As of 9 April 2026, 22 out of 23 Batch 3 EMUs had entered service, with the remaining unit undergoing final testing. The third batch were ordered as part of the new City Rail Link project, due to open in the 2nd half of 2026.

The AM class EMUs run on 25kV overhead wire, and have a top speed of 110 km/h (68 mph). They often run as 3-car sets off-peak, and 6-car sets (2 3-car sets coupled) during peak on the Auckland Metro Network.

The AM class use ETCS Level 1 as their primary train protection system. They are currently the only type in New Zealand operating under ETCS. This allows the AM class to operate under Automatic Train Operation (ATO), although this is currently only in the testing stage.

== Gallery ==
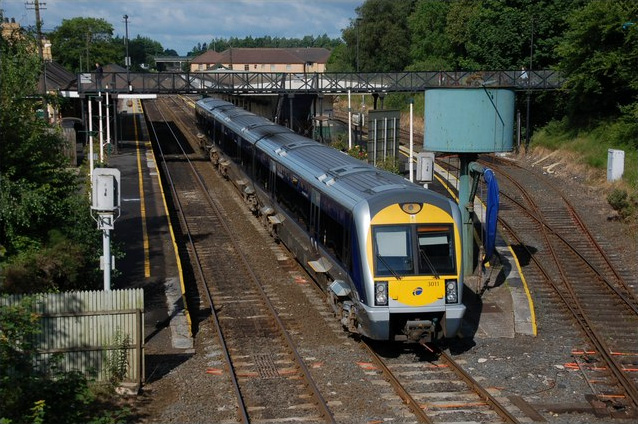
Class 3000 at Lisburn

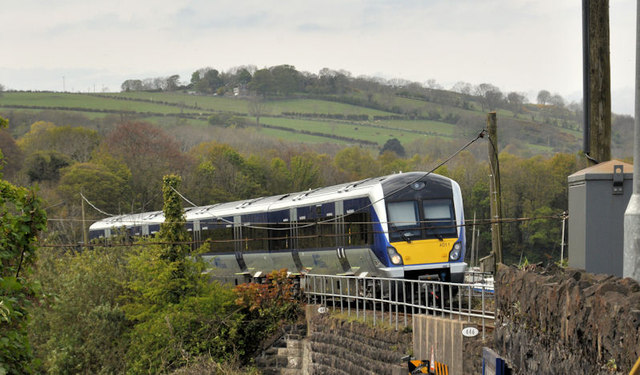
Class 4000 approaching Magheramorne

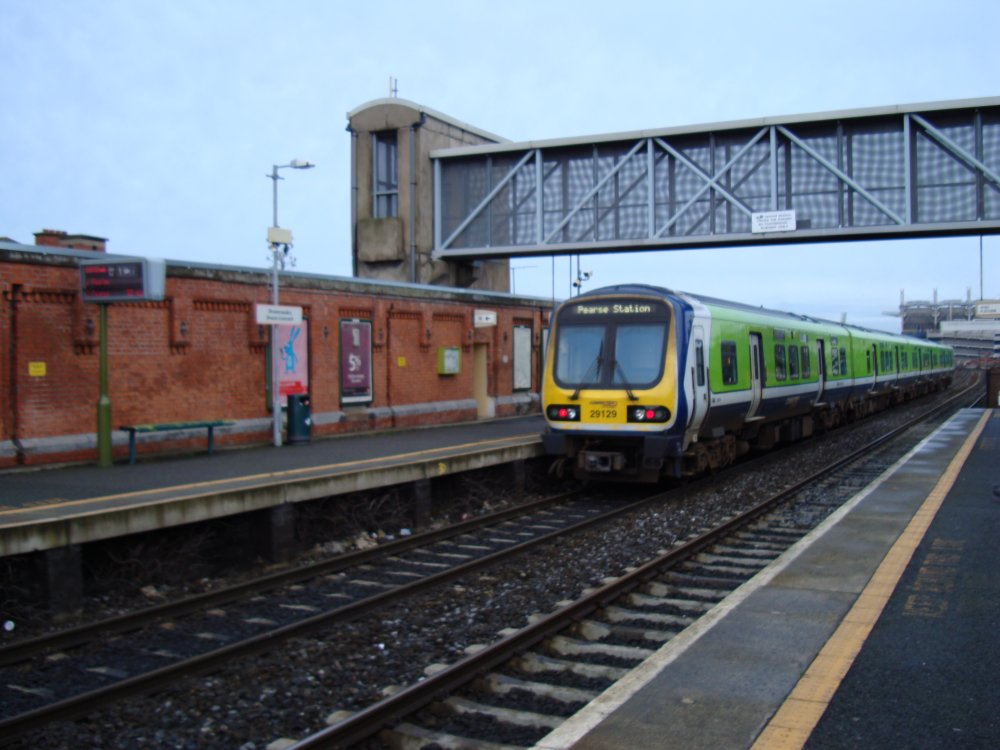
29000 Class departing Drumcondra
