= Mossley railway station (Northern Ireland) =

Railway station in Mossley, Northern Ireland

Mossley
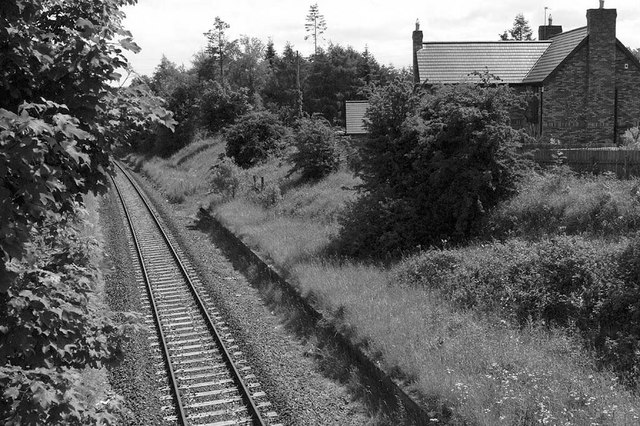
- The remains of Mossley Station Down Platform, looking towards Belfast.

General information
- Location: Mossley, County Antrim; Northern Ireland
- Coordinates: 54.695403°N 5.939984°W

Other information
- Status: Disused

History
- Opened: 1 May 1899; 126 years ago
- Closed: 21 February 1982; 43 years ago
- Original company: Belfast and Northern Counties Railway
- Pre-grouping: Belfast and Northern Counties Railway
- Post-grouping: Northern Ireland Railways
Location

Mossley railway station served the town of Mossley in County Antrim, Northern Ireland.

== History ==
The station was opened by the Belfast and Northern Counties Railway on 1 May 1899.

It was closed along with the rest of the Bleach Green-Antrim line in 1978, but re-opened for a short time in 1980 when the line was used for stopping services from York Road to Antrim. The station closed to passengers on 21 February 1982 when the line was once again mothballed. The line has since been re-opened to passenger use, but this station has been replaced by a new one at Mossley West.

Preceding station	NI Railways	Following station
Whiteabbey	Northern Ireland Railways; Belfast-Derry	Mossley West
	Historical railways	
Monkstown	Belfast and Ballymena Railway; Belfast York Road-Ballymena	Ballyclare Junction
