= Bleach Green =

Railway junction in Northern Ireland

Coordinates: 54.67778°N 5.90334°W

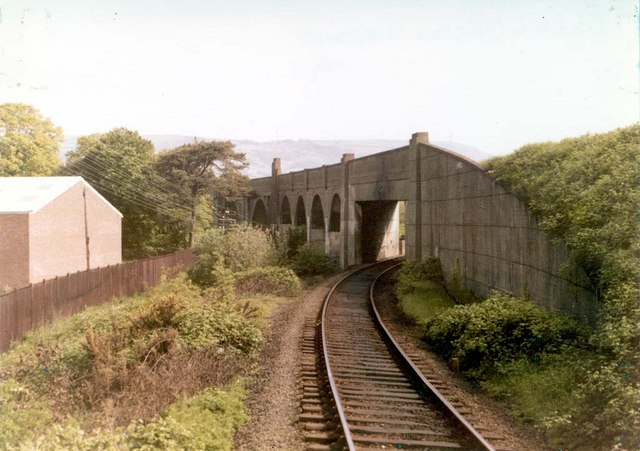
Bleach Green, as seen from a train on the Larne-bound line. The 'burrowing' nature of the junction can be clearly seen, with the Derry line crossing over top.

Bleach Green is a railway junction located in Newtownabbey where the Belfast–Larne line diverges from the Belfast–Derry line. The Bleach Green Junction is the only burrowing junction in the whole of Ireland.

== History ==
Bleach Green railway station opened in 1925 and closed in 1977. Today no trace remains of the halt, though the Larne-bound platform survived until the Antrim line was re-opened on 10th June 2001. The Junction lies 3/4 of a mile to the North of Whiteabbey Station.

The Viaducts being on the Greenisland Loop line were referred to as the "Greenisland Viaducts" and were used in poster promotion campaign by London Midland and Scottish Railways in 1934.

== Viaduct ==
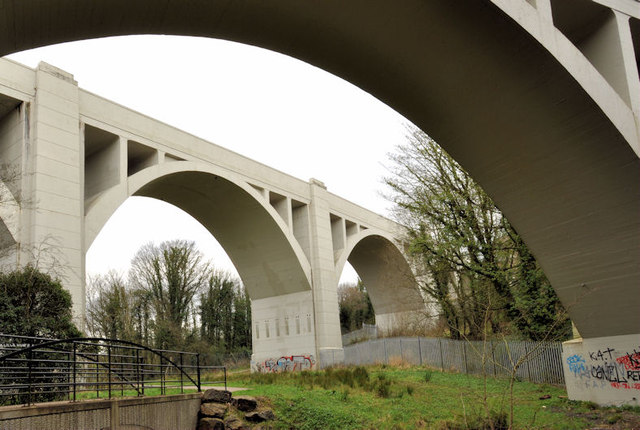
Bleach Green Viaduct

There is a viaduct located at Bleach Green, which was completed in 1933 to allow trains to run between Belfast York Road Station and Ballymena without having to reverse at Greenisland (then Carrickfergus Junction). It was designed by Freeman Wills Crofts, shortly before he retired from Engineering to become a full time author. The viaduct was repainted and the junction relaid in 2001 for the reopening of the railway line between Belfast and Antrim.

Three smaller concrete arches carry the lines over Glenville Road. The one carrying the Larne-bound line was completed in 1931, the one carrying the lines to and from Derry in 1932, and the one carrying the line from Larne to Belfast in 1933.
