= Knockagh Monument =

War memorial in County Antrim, Northern Ireland

Coordinates: 54.7112°N 5.8793°W

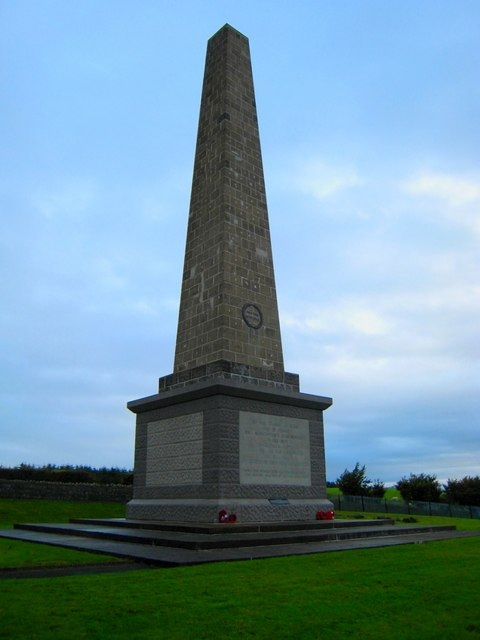
View of the Knockagh Monument, facing north-east.

The Knockagh Monument is a war memorial in County Antrim, Northern Ireland. It is located on top of Knockagh Hill, above the village of Greenisland with a panoramic view of the city of Belfast.

== Features ==
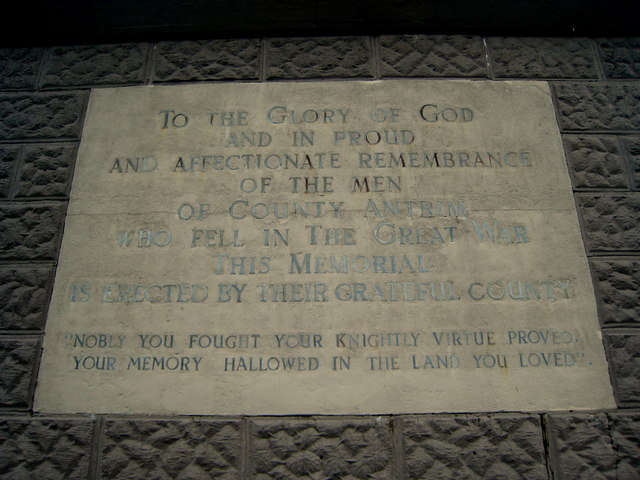
The plaque on the base of the monument.

The site is 390m (1230 feet) above sea level and is the largest war memorial in Northern Ireland. The monument is a 110-foot (34 m)-high basalt obelisk and is a replica of the Wellington Monument in Phoenix Park, Dublin, although is exactly half the height.

The Monument's inscription was adapted from the hymn “O Valiant Hearts" by John S. Arkwright. It reads:

“NOBLY YOU FOUGHT, YOUR KNIGHTLY VIRTUE PROVED
YOUR MEMORY HALLOWED IN THE LAND YOU LOVED.”

== History ==
A committee was set up with Mr. Henry Barton, the High Sheriff of County Antrim, as secretary to raise £25,000 to erect an obelisk in local basalt, with bronze panels listing the names of all those from Co. Antrim who had died in the Great War. The foundation stone was laid on 7 October 1922, but financial difficulties delayed work for a decade. Following Mr Barton's death in 1935, Antrim Rural District Council were asked to adopt the monument and oversee its completion. It was eventually completed in 1936.

Following the Second World War the memorial was dedicated to the fallen of both wars. It was refurbished in 1985 and again in 2006, taking three months and with all 10 Local Councils in County Antrim at the time contributing £1,500 to the total cost of £50,000 of work, although it is sited on what was Carrickfergus Borough Council's ground, now part of Mid and East Antrim Borough Council. On 5 November 2006, the refurbished memorial was unveiled by the Lord Lieutenant of County Antrim, Lord O’Neill and rededicated by Rev. Canon E. J. Moore, T.D., M.A.
