= Alec Mackie (Irish footballer) =

Irish footballer (1903–1984)

Personal information
- Full name: John Alexander Mackie
- Date of birth: 23 February 1903
- Place of birth: Monkstown, County Antrim, Ireland
- Date of death: June 1984 (aged 81)
- Height: 5 ft 9 in (1.75 m)
- Position: Right back

Senior career*
Years	Team	Apps	(Gls)
- Monkstown
19??–1922	Forth River		
1922–1928	Arsenal	108	(0)
1928–1936	Portsmouth	257	(2)
1936–1938	Northampton Town	19	(0)
1938	Sittingbourne		

International career
1923–1935	Ireland (IFA)	3	(0)
- * Club domestic league appearances and goals

John Alexander Mackie (23 February 1903 – June 1984) was an Irish footballer who played as a right-back for various clubs, including Arsenal and Portsmouth in the English Football League.

== Career ==
Born in Monkstown, County Antrim, Mackie started out at Monkstown and Forth River in Belfast, before being spotted by Arsenal in 1922.

It is suggested in many reports that Mackie demanded a pet monkey in place of a signing-on fee, a request Arsenal managed to satisfy thanks to chairman Sir Henry Norris's contacts in international trade. However, a re-analysis of the sources of this story in 2014 suggests the story is fanciful.

Mackie was a young, strong right back, and made his debut on 9 December 1922 against Birmingham City. He soon became a regular in the Arsenal side, making 23 league appearances that season and 31 the next. He also made his debut for Ireland, against Wales on 14 April 1923. However, he became injured early on in 1924–25 and missed most of that season. Although Mackie would return to first-team football, managing 35 league appearances in 1925–26, future Arsenal skipper Tom Parker joined in spring 1926 and soon ousted Mackie from the side altogether.

Mackie played two more seasons for Arsenal, mostly in the reserves, before leaving for Portsmouth in 1928. In all, he made 119 appearances for Arsenal, scoring one goal. At Portsmouth, Mackie became a stalwart for the next seven seasons; he made over 250 league appearances for Pompey, and played in two FA Cup Finals – against Bolton Wanderers in 1929 and Manchester City in 1934, losing both. He also won two more caps for Ireland. He left Portsmouth in 1936, and finished his career at non-league Northampton Town and then Sittingbourne. He died in 1984 at the age of 81.

== Honours ==
Portsmouth

- FA Cup runner-up: 1928–29, 1933–34
