= Whiteabbey railway station =

Railway station in Northern Ireland

Whiteabbey
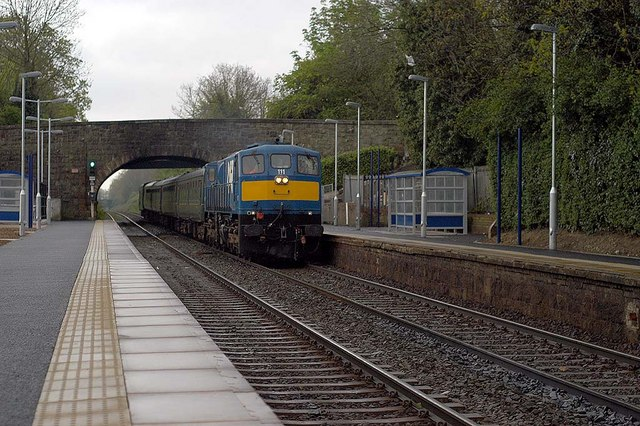
- Whiteabbey railway station in 2008

General information
- Location: Station Road, Whiteabbey, Newtownabbey, BT37 0AW; County Antrim; Northern Ireland
- Coordinates: 54°40′22″N 5°54′16″W
- System: Commuter rail
- Owner: NI Railways
- Operator: NI Railways
- Lines: Derry ~ Londonderry Line; Larne Line
- Platforms: 2
- Tracks: 2
- Train operators: NI Railways

Construction
- Structure type: At-grade
- Parking: 113 spaces (including 6 accessible spaces)
- Cycle facilities: 10 spaces
- Accessible: yes

Other information
- Status: Operational
- Station code: WY
- Fare zone: iLink Zone 3
- Website: www.translink.co.uk/Whiteabbey

History
- Original company: Belfast and Ballymena Railway

Key dates
- 11 April 1848: Opened
- 2008: Refurbished

Passengers
- 2022/23: 284,964
- 2023/24: ▲362,235
- 2024/25: ▼352,820
- 2025/26: ▲400,769

Services
Preceding station	NI Railways	Following station
Jordanstown towards Carrickfergus, Whitehead, Larne Town or Larne Harbour	Larne Line	York Street towards Belfast Grand Central
Mossley West towards Coleraine, Portrush or Derry~Londonderry	Derry ~ Londonderry Line Limited services	York Street towards Belfast Grand Central

Historical railways
Preceding station	Historical railways	Following station
Greenisland; Line and station open	Belfast and Ballymena Railway; York Road–Ballymena (1848–1860)	Whitehouse; Line open, station closed
Jordanstown; Line and station open	Belfast and Ballymena Railway; York Road–Carrickfergus (1848–1860)	Whitehouse; Line open, station closed
Greenisland; Line and station open	Belfast and Northern Counties Railway; York Road–Ballymena (1860–1903)	Whitehouse; Line open, station closed
Jordanstown; Line and station open	Belfast and Northern Counties Railway; York Road–Carrickfergus and Larne (1860–1903)	Whitehouse; Line open, station closed
Monkstown; Line open, station closed	Northern Counties Committee; York Road–Ballymena via Greenisland (1903–1934)	Whitehouse; Line open, station closed
Jordanstown; Line and station open	Northern Counties Committee; York Road–Larne (1903–1934)	Whitehouse; Line open, station closed
Monkstown; Line open, station closed	Northern Counties Committee; York Road–Ballymena via Bleach Green (1934–1949)	Whitehouse; Line open, station closed
Bleach Green; Line open, station closed	Northern Counties Committee; York Road–Larne (1934–1949)	Whitehouse; Line open, station closed
Monkstown; Line open, station closed	Ulster Transport Authority; York Road–Ballymena (1949–1967)	Whitehouse; Line open, station closed
Bleach Green; Line open, station closed	Ulster Transport Authority; York Road–Larne (1949–1967)	Whitehouse; Line open, station closed
Route map
(Click to expand)
Location
- Location within Northern Ireland Location within island of Ireland

Whiteabbey Railway Station serves the village of Whiteabbey in Newtownabbey, Northern Ireland.

== History ==
The station was opened by the Belfast and Ballymena Railway on 11 April 1848.

The station buildings were erected in 1863–1864, and the waiting room on the down platform was built in the 1890s. These buildings have since been demolished and replaced with basic NIR shelters.

After Whiteabbey, the next station down the Larne line used to be Bleach Green Halt, but this was closed in May 1977. Close to the Bleach Green Viaducts.

== Service ==
It is the first station outside Belfast on the Larne Line. On weekdays, there is a half-hourly service to Belfast Grand Central with extra trains at peak times. In the other direction, there is a half-hourly service with the terminus alternating between Whitehead and Larne Harbour every half an hour, with additional services to Carrickfergus and Larne Town at peak times.

The first train out on weekdays is the 06:15 to Whitehead and last train in is at 23:10.

On Saturdays, there are fewer peak time trains, but the service remains half-hourly. On Sundays, there is an hourly service on the Larne Line.

Although technically on the Belfast-Derry railway line, Whiteabbey only sees one weekday morning service from Coleraine, one weekday morning service from Derry~Londonderry, and two weekday evening services to Coleraine calling. No other Belfast-Derry services call at Whiteabbey outside of special circumstances.

== Facilities ==
At Whiteabbey there are 2 carparks, one at each platform. The station could be considered accessible to those who are mobility impaired, with steps and ramps.

There are benches and shelters on each platform.

At the end of the Belfast platform, there is a footpath (not signposted) that runs alongside the railway to Dillon's Avenue. The residential street has access to the main road through Whiteabbey.
