= NIR Class 4000 =

Northern Irish diesel multiple unit trains

Northern Ireland Railways Class 4000 "C4K"
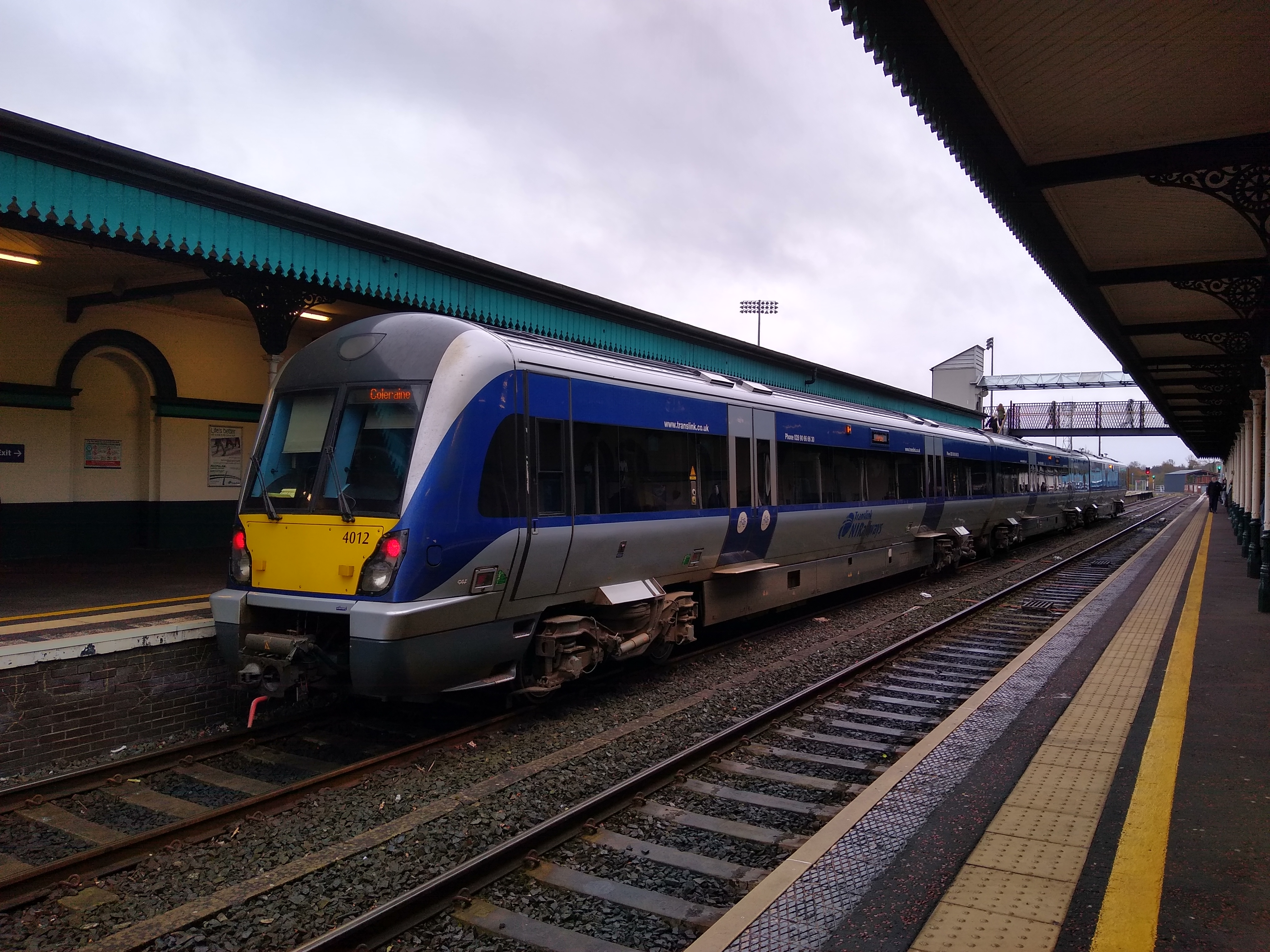
- Class 4000 DMU 4012 at Coleraine railway station, 2021

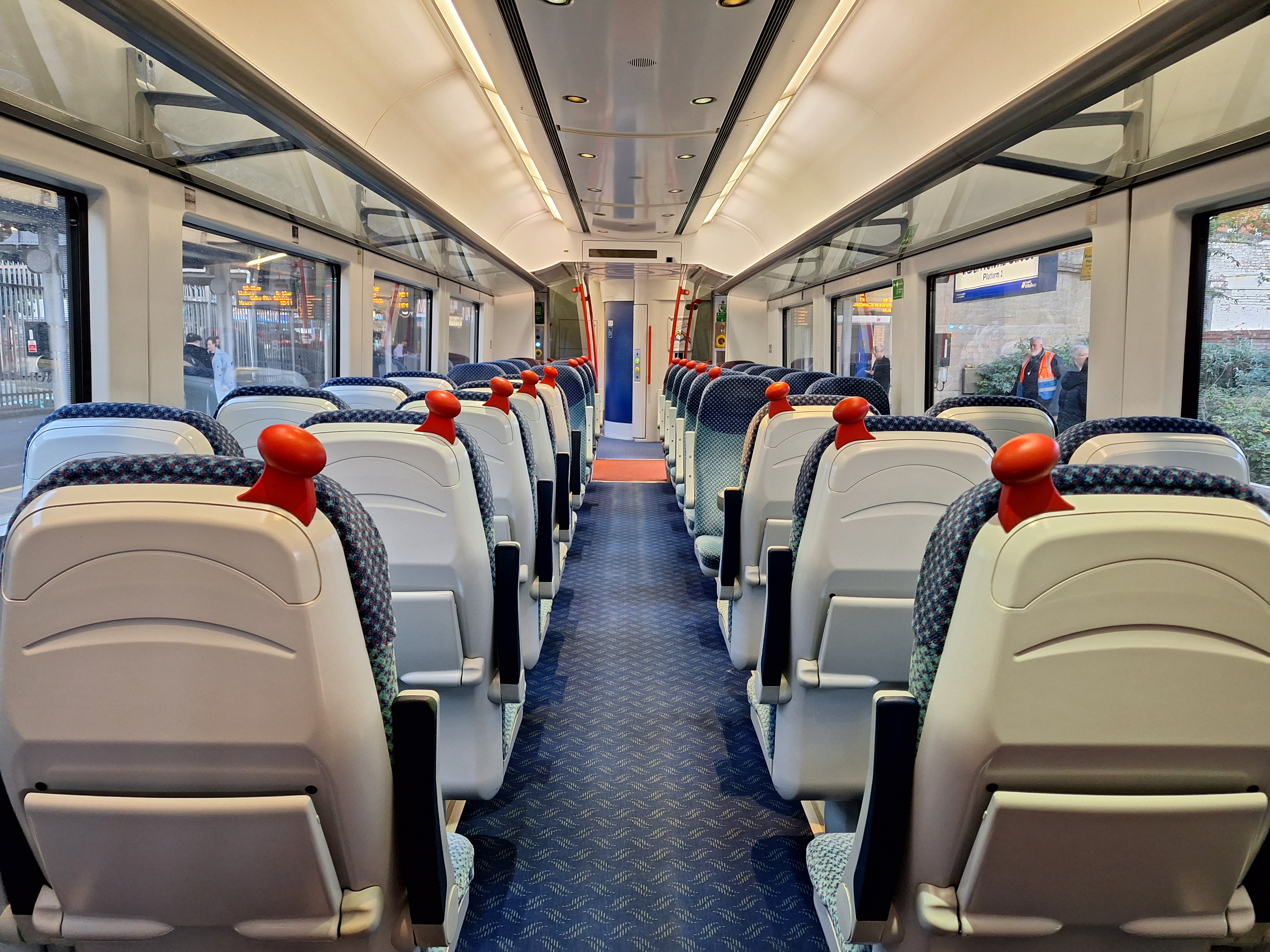
- Interior view of car 4513 of set 4013
- In service: 29 September 2011–present
- Manufacturer: CAF
- Family name: CxK
- Replaced: Class 450 and Class 80
- Entered service: 2011–2012
- Number built: 20 sets (81 cars in total, 40 DM cars, 41 intermediates)
- Formation: 13 3-car sets; 7 6-car sets
- Fleet numbers: 4001-4013 (3-car); 4014-4020 (6-car)
- Capacity: 212 seated (3-car); 442 seated (6-car)
- Operator: NI Railways

Specifications
- Maximum speed: 145 km/h (90 mph)
- Prime mover: MTU 6H 1800 R84 (one per car)
- Engine type: Inline-6 turbo-diesel
- Displacement: 12.8 L (780 cu in) per engine
- Power output: 390 kW (520 hp) per engine
- Transmission: ZF Ecomat-Rail 6 speed; ZF Reversing final drive
- Safety systems: AWS, TPWS
- Track gauge: 1,600 mm (5 ft 3 in)

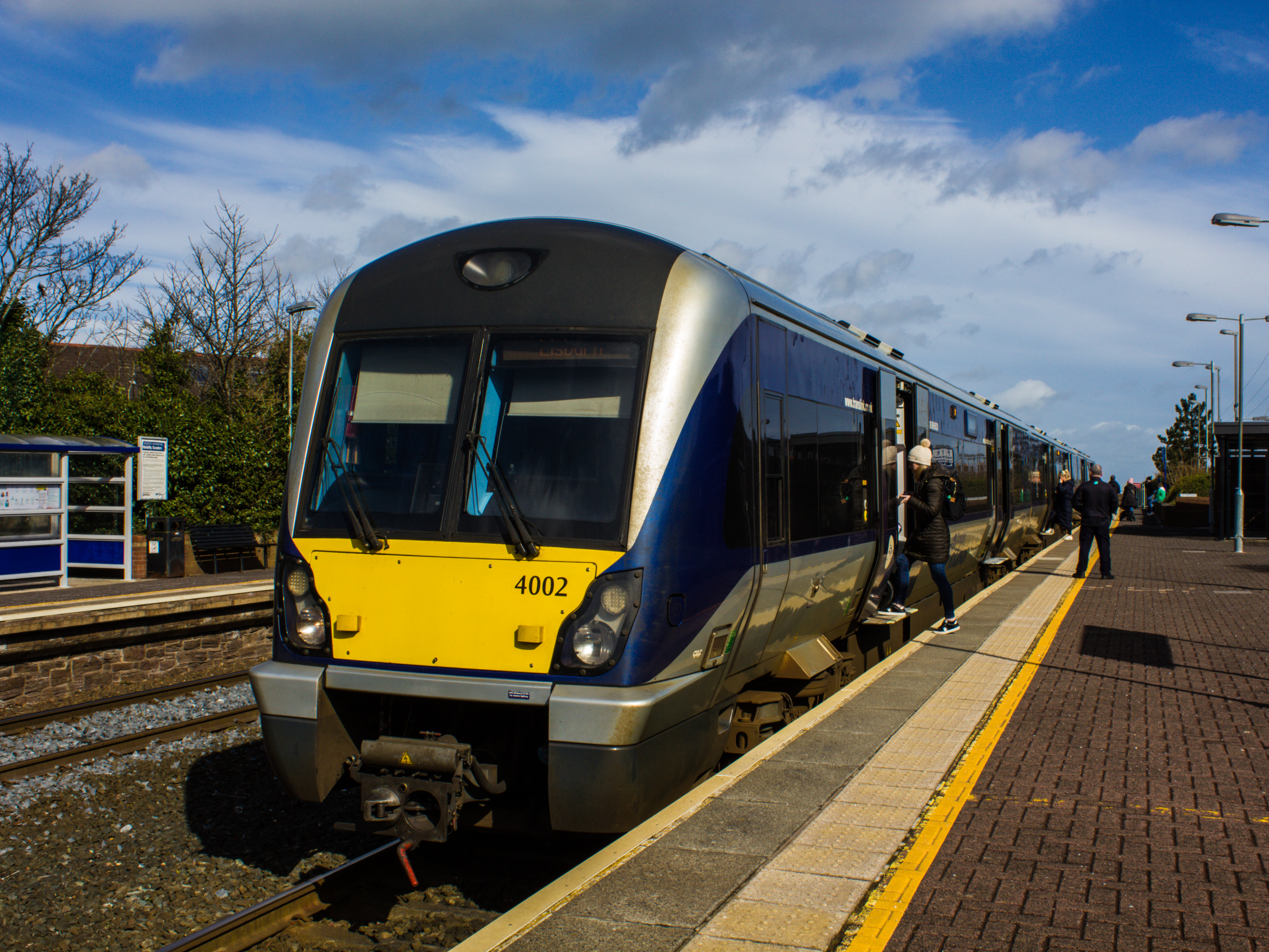
NIR C4k no. 4002 at Holywood station

The Class 4000 is a type of diesel multiple unit (DMU) in service with Northern Ireland Railways. The fleet was procured to replace outdated rolling stock, particularly Class 80 and Class 450 trains, increasing capacity and allowing longer trains to operate. The 20 trains were built by CAF, which already had previously supplied the Class 3000 units. The Class 4000 trains entered service in 2011, with significant differences from the Class 3000 fleet, such as increased seating capacity and improved fuel economy. In 2018, 21 additional vehicles were ordered to further extend train lengths and the first extended train entered service in 2021.

== History ==
Prior to 2000, the NIR rolling stock consisted of a mixture of diesel multiple unit types that had entered service between 15 and 25 years previously. The main type was the Class 80, based on the Mark 2b bodyshell, 22 3-car and 4-car units built in two batches between 1973 and 1979. Additional capacity was provided with the Class 450, nine 3-car units that entered service in 1985 based on the Mark 3 bodyshell. Chronic underinvestment in the railway meant that by the millennium these were the newest domestic trains. By 2000 it was estimated that the network required investment of £183 million to bring it up to basic safety standards.

=== New trains ===
Recognising that the railways serve an important role in the growth of the local economy, the devolved Northern Ireland Assembly granted funding for improvements in December 2000 following the report of the Railways Task Force. Included was £80 million for rolling stock, the largest order in the history of NIR. The result was the Class 3000 DMU from CAF in Spain, 23 three-car units used to replace the increasingly outdated Class 80. They entered service between 2004 and 2005. This was a like-for-like replacement meaning that older rolling stock had to be retained, and NIR could not introduce the service enhancements it desired.

=== "New Trains Two" ===
The expanding economy led to increasing pressure to improve the rail network, with recommendations made in a debate in the Northern Ireland Assembly in May 2007. Among these was the purchase of rolling stock to replace the remaining Class 80 and Class 450 trains. Translink instituted the "New Trains 2010" (later renamed "New Trains Two") proposal for new trains, and decided that it needed to improve its service frequency to go with the associated infrastructure improvements, which would mean expanding the fleet. The proposal was that up to 20 trains would be purchased, which would replace the Class 450 and 80 units and expand the fleet by up to seven trains. The go-ahead was given on the publication of the draft budget of the Department for Regional Development, which allocated £137 million over three years to Translink, including for 20 trains.

Translink issued the invitation to tender (ITT) in June 2008. Three firm offers were received: Bombardier Transportation offered the Class 172 Turbostar being built for operation on the British network; Hyundai Rotem a variant of the 22000 Class ICR purchased by Iarnród Éireann (ruled out because of NIR's desire to have units with 1/3 and 2/3 spaced doors); and CAF a variant of the Class 3000 units. In March 2009 CAF was awarded the contract for 20 three-car trains, with an option for 20 additional intermediate carriages. The first train was delivered in March 2011 and after testing it entered service in September 2011. The final train was delivered to Belfast in July 2012.

=== Extra carriages ===
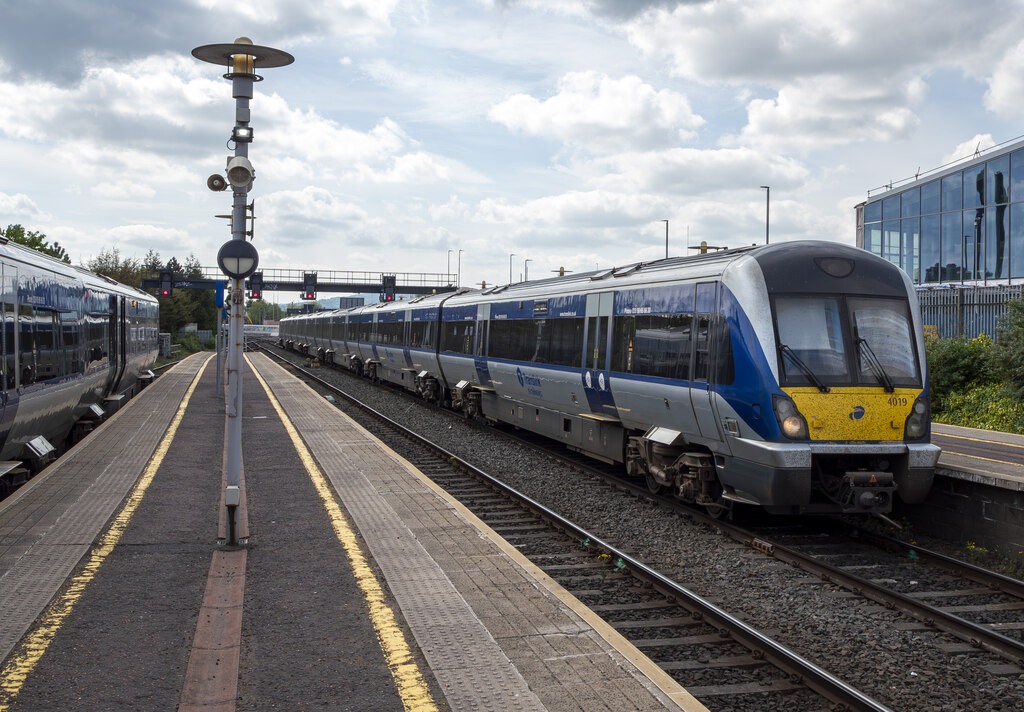
Extended train 4019 at Great Victoria Street station

In 2018 Translink took up an option in the original order for 21 additional intermediate carriages, at a cost of £50 million, in order to extend seven trains to six cars long. The first new carriage was delivered in March 2021 and the first extended train entered service in September 2021, with all six expected to be complete by September 2022.

Many three-car units have also been refurbished with new carpets, new seating and USB charging points at tables.

=== Timetable ===
The timetable for the introduction was released at the same time as the ITT:

- June 2008 – Invitation to Tender
- Wednesday 25 March 2009 – Contracts signed
- June 2010 – Construction of first train begins
- Monday 14 March 2011 – Delivery of first train
- Thursday 29 September 2011 – First train enters passenger service
- Tuesday 3 July 2012 – Final train arrives in Belfast
- Wednesday 19 September 2012 – Final train entered service
- Thursday 6 December 2018 – Order signed with CAF for an additional 21 Class 4000 carriages
- September 2021 – First six-car train entered service

== Specification ==
Although the trains are externally similar to the C3K fleet, internally they have significant differences. Each three-car train has a seating capacity of 212, with fewer table bays and extra standing room. They have one toilet compared to the C3K's two. They have a new traction system, with an MTU 390kW engine providing power for both traction and auxiliary generators. With a train being four tonnes lighter than a C3K unit, fuel economy is improved.

== Usage ==
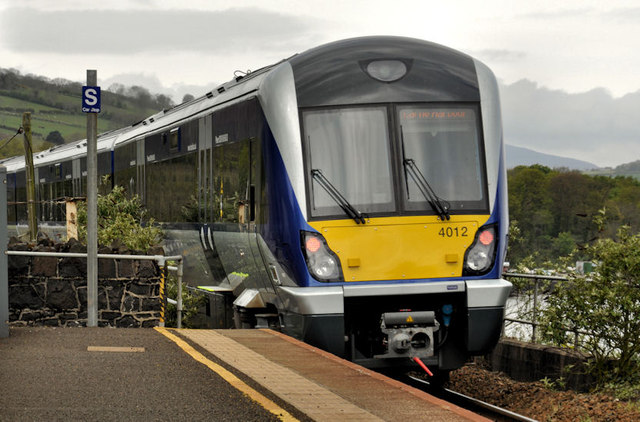
Class 4000 departing Magheramorne

The 20 trains have replaced the 13 remaining trains of Class 80 and Class 450. Of the seven extra sets, NIR has earmarked five for increasing capacity by running in six-car formations, with the other two planned to improve service frequency on the Derry-Londonderry Line once renovation work has been completed and a new crossing loop laid.

== Fleet details ==
Class	Operator	No. Built	Year built	Cars per Set	Unit nos.	In service	Notes
Class 4000	NI Railways	20	2010–2021	3	4001–4013	13	
Class 4000	NI Railways	20	2010–2021	6	4014–4020	7	New carriages entered service in September 2021
