= Monkstown, County Antrim =

- electoral ward and townland
- Coordinates: 54.68478°N 5.89505°W

Monkstown (Irish: Baile na Manach) is a townland (of 811 acres) and electoral ward in County Antrim, Northern Ireland. It is within the urban area of Newtownabbey and the Antrim and Newtownabbey Borough Council area. The townland was previously called Ballynamanagh (from Irish Baile na Manach 'townland of the monks') It is also situated in the civil parish of Carnmoney and the historic barony of Belfast Lower.

Monkstown is said to be the burial place of Fergus Mor Mac Eirc, king of Dal Riata. which suggests a religious house was established in the 5th century CE. It possibly became a grange- a farm that was managed by a monastery, and was possibly associated with the monastery at Woodburn in Carrickfergus. The modern housing estate of Monkstown began construction around 1960 and was mixed Catholic and protestant, at the beginning of the troubles it losts its entire catholic residency by 1971. In recent years it has become increasingly mixed with a significant Polish and Lithuanian community.

== Railways ==
Monkstown railway station is currently closed on the Belfast-Derry railway line run by Northern Ireland Railways.

== Education ==
Schools and colleges which serve the area include Abbey Community College, Hollybank Primary School and University of Ulster.

== Sport ==
The local association football clubs, 18th Newtownabbey F.C. and Nortel F.C., play in the Northern Amateur Football League.

== Notable people ==
- Alec Mackie (1903–1984), footballer
- Jim Hagan (born 1956), former professional footballer and football club manager
- Michael Smith, professional footballer
