= Greenisland railway station =

Railway station in Northern Ireland

Greenisland
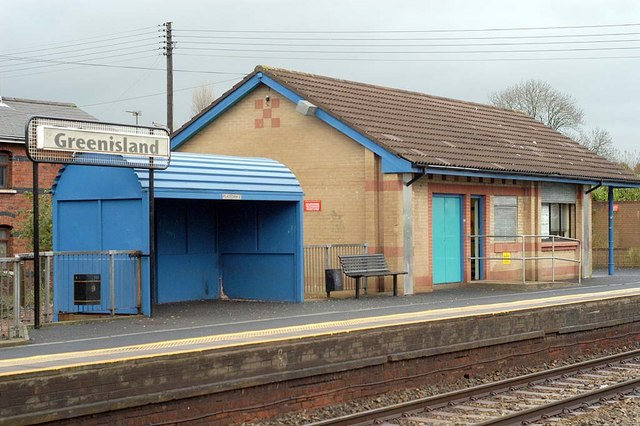

General information
- Location: Greenisland; Northern Ireland
- Coordinates: 54°42′1″N 5°52′24″W
- Owner: NI Railways
- Operator: NI Railways
- Line: Larne
- Platforms: 2
- Tracks: 2

Construction
- Structure type: At-grade

Other information
- Station code: GD

Key dates
- 1848: Opened as Carrickfergus Junction
- 1893: Renamed to Greenisland
- 2008: Station refurbished

Passengers
- 2022/23: 227,825
- 2023/24: ▲289,058
- 2024/25: ▲293,393
- 2025/26: ▲313,013
- NI Railways; Translink; NI railway stations
Route map
(Click to expand)
Location
- Location within Northern Ireland Location within island of Ireland

Greenisland railway station serves Greenisland in County Antrim, Northern Ireland. The station opened on 11 April 1848 as Carrickfergus Junction. It was renamed on 10 January 1893. The station used to be larger, with a third platform, but this was removed after the closure of the spur to the Derry~Londonderry Line. The station building is staffed from 7am to 3pm. A park and ride facility was built in 2009.

== History ==
Originally, services to stations on the Derry~Londonderry Line would travel from York Road to Greenisland, then reverse and travel to the Derry~Londonderry Line by a spur to Monkstown. It had long recognized that the need for Main Line trains to reverse like this at Greenisland was undesirable. Various plans for a direct line bypassing Greenisland had been proposed over the years, but the engineering problems faced by having to cross Valentine's Glen near Whiteabbey and surmount Mossley Col had precluded these. Construction on such a scheme (the Greenisland Loop Line, from Bleach Green to Monkstown) eventually started on 1 January 1931. It opened in 1934.

This involved creating a new junction at Bleach Green where the Larne and Loop Lines diverged. The former mainline from Greenisland Junction was singled and joined the new Main Line at a new connection, Mossley Junction, to the east of Mossley station. The old mainline became known as the "Back Line". The ruling gradient on the Loop Line was 1 in 75 which could only be achieved by excavating and lowering a section of the existing Main Line near Mossley station. The new lines were carried over Valentine's Glen on imposing ferroconcrete viaducts. The smaller of these curved to the east from Bleach Green Junction as a burrowing junction passing under a skew span of the larger Main Line viaduct which curved westwards. The old masonry Main Line viaduct was retained to carry what had become the up Larne Line.

A strike by Irish locomotive men in 1933 delayed completion, and it was not until 22 January 1934 that the new lines opened for regular service.

Part of the program included resignalling the lines between Belfast, Greenisland, and Mossley Junction with automatic colour light signals. A new signal cabin was built at Greenisland to control train movements over the triangle formed by the Loop Line, Larne Line, and the Back Line.

Although the distance covered by the Loop Line was only two miles less than by the old route, eliminating the reversal at Greenisland saved as much as fifteen minutes allowing services to be accelerated. Some Main Line trains were divided at Ballyclare Junction, with coaches for Larne Harbour being detached and worked over the Back Line to Greenisland while the main part of the train continued to Belfast.

== Service ==
On weekdays, there is a half-hourly service to Belfast Grand Central with extra trains at peak times. In the other direction, there is a half-hourly service with the terminus alternating between Whitehead and Larne Harbour every half an hour, with extra services to Carrickfergus and Larne Town at peak times.

On Saturdays, the service remains half-hourly, with fewer peak time services.

On Sundays, the service reduces to hourly operation in both directions.

Preceding station	NI Railways	Following station
Jordanstown	Northern Ireland Railways; Belfast-Larne Line	Trooperslane
	Disused railways	
Trooperslane	Ulster Transport Authority; Belfast-Derry via Greenisland	Monkstown
	Historical railways	
Jordanstown; Line and station open	Northern Counties Committee; Belfast-Larne	Trooperslane; Line and station open
