= Whitehouse railway station (Northern Ireland) =

Railway station in County Antrim, Northern Ireland

Whitehouse

General information
- Location: Whitehouse Park, Newtownabbey, County Antrim; Northern Ireland
- Coordinates: 54.656906°N 5.908763°W

Other information
- Status: Disused

History
- Original company: Belfast and Ballymena Railway
- Pre-grouping: Belfast and Northern Counties Railway
- Post-grouping: Ulster Transport Authority

Key dates
- 11 April 1848: Station opens
- June 1906: Station relocated
- 20 September 1954: Station closes
Location

Whitehouse railway station was on the Belfast and Ballymena Railway which ran from Belfast to Ballymena in Northern Ireland.

== History ==
The station was opened by the Belfast and Ballymena Railway on 11 April 1848.

The station closed to passengers on 20 September 1954.

| Preceding station | NI Railways | Following station |
|---|---|---|
| York Road | Ulster Transport Authority; Belfast-Larne | Whiteabbey |
| | Historical railways | |
| Greencastle | Belfast and Ballymena Railway; Belfast York Road-Ballymena | Whiteabbey |
