= Greenisland =

Town near Belfast, Northern Ireland

Coordinates: 54.695°N 5.857°W

Greenisland: Irish: Inis Glas
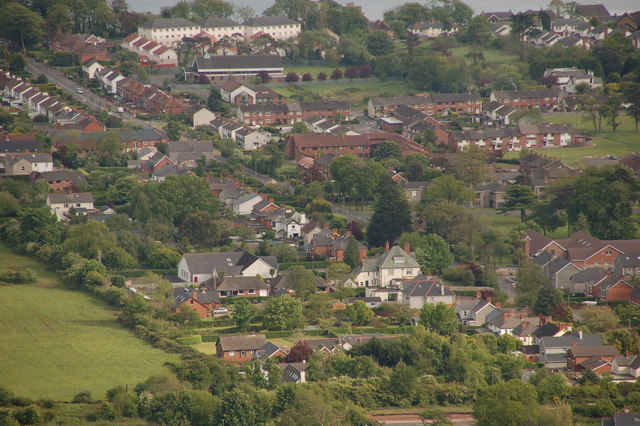
- Greenisland, as viewed from the Knockagh Monument

- Location within Northern Ireland
- Population: 5,486 (2011 Census)
- District: Carrickfergus
- County: County Antrim
- Country: Northern Ireland
- Sovereign state: United Kingdom
- Post town: CARRICKFERGUS
- Postcode district: BT38
- Dialling code: 028
- UK Parliament: East Antrim

Greenisland is a town in County Antrim, Northern Ireland. It lies 7 miles north-east of Belfast and 3 miles south-west of Carrickfergus. The town is on the coast of Belfast Lough and is named after a tiny islet to the west, the Green Island.

It is a semi-rural community located at the foot of Carn Hill, upon which stands the Knockagh Monument, a war memorial for those from County Antrim who died in the first and second world wars.

The town has two distinct areas, known locally as Upper Greenisland and Lower Greenisland after the upper Station Road and lower Station Road around which two parts are respectively located. Upper Greenisland stretches from Upper Road (B90) to the railway station at the bottom of Upper Station Road, includes Greenisland Primary School and features predominantly middle-class demographics and housing. Lower Greenisland runs from the railway station, down Station Road and ends at Shore Road (part of the A2 road). It features a large, predominantly Protestant working-class housing estate built during the 1950s and 1960s and includes Greenisland Library, Greenisland Community Centre, a number of churches, a small shopping parade at Glassillan Court and Silverstream Primary School. The village in its entirety stretches from the foot of the hill to the shore of Belfast Lough.

== History ==
Originally, the area now known as Greenisland was merely an unnamed area of the town of Carrickfergus with the Silverstream river, now the western boundary of Greenisland, marking the westernmost boundary of the large town. Today, roadsigns indicate that the river, which now flows through the grounds of Belfast High School, is the exact boundary between the Carrickfergus and Newtownabbey boroughs. From 1602 to 1606 the "freemen", leading citizens of Carrickfergus, obtained the right to redistribute this area of land from the Crown, renaming the area the West Division - a name which remains legal today.

Farmland was distributed in strips from Knockagh Hill, to the shore of Belfast Lough and lanes were constructed to provide access to the farms and their houses, including important residences such as Castle Lugg. The most notable of these was Longfield Lane, which was eventually widened and surfaced to provide access to the railway station, becoming the Station Road. Many of the lanes also remain in their original narrow state, such as Neill's Lane and Windfield Lane both of which run north from the Shore Road on either side of Greenisland.

In the 1800s, following the growth of Belfast towards the end of the 18th century, several bathing lodges used for summer recreation were established in the area. One such lodge existed until 2020 as the "Ravenhill Nursing Home", operated by the Northern Health and Social Care Trust. During this period, Bassett's directory of 1888 notes that the area was "devoted entirely to handsome residences occupied for the greater part by gentlemen engaged in commercial and professional pursuits in Belfast".

The Belfast-to-Ballymena railway line was opened in 1845, which travelled through the area, providing one of the first transport links to the town from both Belfast and Carrickfergus. The village was finally given the official name of Greenisland in 1893 when the Greenisland railway station was constructed in its present site. Improvements in transport and a growth in prosperity led to more semi-detached and terraced houses in the area immediately surrounding the railway station.

In 1859, the Christian Revival that swept Ulster arrived in Greenisland and an open-air service was held in the field below Longfield Farm (now known locally as Johnstone Farm) which is still standing on the Station Road. By 1860 the interdenominational Ebenezer Hall was built for worshippers on the Shore Road. This was then followed in 1912 when the Presbyterian Knockagh Hall was built on the Upper Road. Neither of these buildings survive, but the congregations of these two churches remain. With Greenisland Ebenezer Church of the Nazarene now in Longfield Gardens and Greenisland Presbyterian Church on the Upper Road. Over the years they have been joined by several other churches as Greenisland has grown.

Greenisland Primary School replaced a school in Trooperslane in 1938, when it was realised that children had to walk two miles to Trooperslane and back every day. On the opening day, pupils arrived at the Trooperslane school and then walked to the new school carrying armfuls of books, jars of ink and other learning materials.

During World War II, the new school's headmaster, as an Army reservist, was called into action. Soon after, an air-raid shelter was built in the playground and gas masks were placed under desks, where the pupils would store their bags. Village residents formed a Home Guard and Civil Defence Post and air-raid drills became regular free 'entertainment' in the evenings. Stirrup pumps were issued to put out fires and proved very useful for watering gardens during the summer. The name on the outside of the school was covered during the war so that any German parachutists landing in Greenisland would be disorientated, not knowing where they were.

In Easter 1941, when a German plane was reported to have flown up the Lough towards Belfast, the anti-aircraft battery on Neill's Lane opened fire. It was the only occasion during the war that necessitated the air-raid shelters in Greenisland. The guns did not bring down any aircraft and only managed to crack some windows in the village. However, it was soon realised that a full-scale attack had been waged on the city of Belfast (today known as the Belfast Blitz, the greatest loss of life outside London during the Blitz) and the village's Air Raid Precautions volunteers disappeared into Belfast for several days to help with the recovery.

== Local landmarks ==
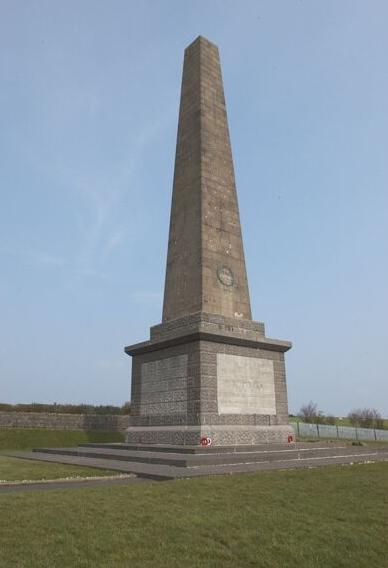
The Knockagh Monument, which overlooks Greenisland

The Knockagh Monument, a basalt obelisk erected as a memorial to the citizens of County Antrim who died during World War I and World War II. It sits at the summit of Carn Hill known locally as "Knockagh Hill", overlooking the village and is the most notable landmark of the surrounding area.

Castle Lugg is owned by the National Trust. The tower was described in the OS memoirs as "a square tower... nothing now remains but a portion of the N wall 27ft long & 25ft high - with a very small portion of the E side attached to it...There is no tradition or local record to throw any light on the origin, history or destruction of this castle". A small excavation was carried out at the site in 1980, but failed to establish a precise date of layout of the structure; documentary evidence suggest it existed by 1570. It is still much as it was when described in 1839, with the remains of the N wall, 8m long x 1.2m thick x c.5m high & a fragment of the E wall surviving at the NE corner. Two modern walls extend S from the E & W sides of the N wall & formed part of a forge.

== Shops and services ==
Greenisland has a number of shops and services which include: grocery shops and newsagents, a petrol filling station, a butcher's shop, a golf club, a hair salon and a barber's shop, a bakery, a dental practice and doctors' surgery, a chemist, a number of takeaway food outlets and a nursing home formerly known as The Knockagh Lodge, an off-licence, car sales, a cafe and two children's nurseries.

The area is also served by the local NEELB Library, and has a community centre, youth centre and Scout hall.

== Transport ==
=== Rail ===
Greenisland railway station, opened on 11 April 1848, provides direct rail links in both the Belfast and Larne directions, from around 5am until 11pm. The vast majority of train services from the Belfast and Larne directions stop at Greenisland, with the exception of occasional express Belfast to Carrickfergus services.

=== Bus ===
A majority of Ulsterbus Belfast and Carrickfergus/Whitehead bus services take a ten-minute detour into the Greenisland estate before continuing to their destination, providing the village with frequent transport links in each direction.

=== Road ===
There have been multiple attempts, since the 1970s, for the A2 Shore Road bottleneck to be removed and a dual carriageway to be built. Proposals began to re-emerge around 2005 for the introduction of a multimillion-pound dual carriageway along the A2. In preparation for this, public consultations were conducted and relevant properties purchased. Conor Murphy, the then Regional Development Minister, stated in June 2010 that subject to "finances being available, delivery is expected to start in 2011-12, and the project should be completed in 2013". This was then further delayed until finances could be found. In January 2013, a contract for the widening of the A2 shore road was awarded to Graham Construction. Work began in March 2013 and was opened to traffic on 28 September 2015.

== Education ==
- Greenisland Primary School is the primary education establishment in the village, located on the Upper Station Road.
- Silverstream Primary School is the second primary school in the area, and is located in the estate area in the south of Greenisland.
- Belfast High School is a grammar school located to the west of the village.
- The Jordanstown campus of the University of Ulster is less than a mile from Greenisland.

== Sports clubs ==
Greenisland has a number of sports clubs and facilities including Greenisland Golf Club, Greenisland Bowling Green, Greenisland War Memorial Sports Club (GWMSC), Greenisland Ladies Hockey Club, Greenisland Boys Football Club, Knockagh View Equestrian Centre, Knockagh Wrestling Club (operated by Dave Finlay Sr.)

== Politics ==
Greenisland was part of Carrickfergus Borough Council but is now part of the much larger Mid and East Antrim Borough Council and forms part of the Knockagh district electoral area. It is also in the East Antrim Westminster and Assembly constituencies.

== Demography ==
On census day 2011 (27 March 2011), there were 5,486 people living in Greenisland, an increase of 8.6% on the Census 2001 figure of 5,050. Of these:

- 19.1% were aged under 16 years and 17.4% were aged 65 and over
- 48.8% of the population were male and 51.2% were female
- 11.1% were from a Catholic background and 77.6% were from a Protestant or other Christian background.
- 4.2% of people aged 16–74 were unemployed.

== Notable people ==
- Maurice Field (born 1964), rugby union player
- Robert James Johnstone (1872–1938), physician and politician
- William Edward Wilson (1851–1908), astronomer
- Jonny Evans (born 1988), footballer for Manchester United

== See also ==
- List of towns and villages in Northern Ireland
- List of localities in Northern Ireland by population
- List of places in County Antrim
