= Greencastle railway station =

Railway station in County Antrim, Northern Ireland

Greencastle

General information
- Location: Greencastle, Newtownabbey, County Antrim; Northern Ireland
- Coordinates: 54.645714°N 5.917742°W

Other information
- Status: Disused

History
- Original company: Belfast and Ballymena Railway
- Pre-grouping: Belfast and Northern Counties Railway
- Post-grouping: Belfast and Northern Counties Railway

Key dates
- 11 April 1848: Station opens
- June 1906: Station relocated
- 20 September 1954: Station closes
Location

Greencastle railway station was on the Belfast and Ballymena Railway which ran from Belfast to Ballymena in Northern Ireland.

== History ==
The station was opened by the Belfast and Ballymena Railway on 11 April 1848.

The station closed to passengers on 20 September 1954.

Preceding station	Historical railways	Following station
York Road	Belfast and Ballymena Railway; Belfast York Road-Ballymena	Whitehouse
