= Jordanstown railway station =

Railway station in County Antrim, Northern Ireland

Jordanstown
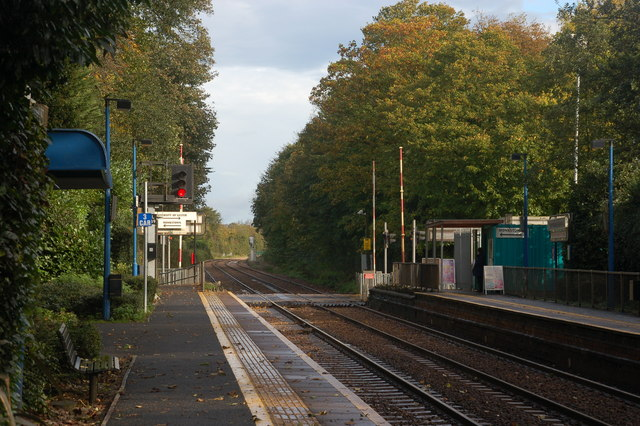
- Jordanstown station in 2006

General information
- Location: Jordanstown; Northern Ireland
- Coordinates: 54°41′14″N 5°53′44″W
- Owner: NI Railways
- Operator: NI Railways
- Line: Larne
- Platforms: 2
- Tracks: 2

Construction
- Structure type: At-grade

Other information
- Station code: JN

Key dates
- 1853: Station opened
- 2008: Station refurbished

Passengers
- 2022/23: 357,325
- 2023/24: ▲426,418
- 2024/25: ▼375,411
- 2025/26: ▲436,141
- NI Railways; Translink; NI railway stations
Route map
(Click to expand)
Location
- Location within Northern Ireland Location within island of Ireland

Jordanstown railway station serves Jordanstown and the University of Ulster in Newtownabbey, Northern Ireland. A park and ride facility for the station has been proposed to ease congestion on the main Jordanstown Road.

The station was opened on 1 February 1853. The station buildings were demolished in the 1980s and replaced by modest shelters. Prior to this, the station was staffed permanently and had a manually operated level crossing. Today, the level crossing is automatic, and the station is only staffed on the Belfast-bound platform at peak times.

== Service ==
On Mondays to Fridays, there is a half-hourly service to Belfast Grand Central with extra trains at peak times. In the other direction, there is a half-hourly service with the terminus alternating between Whitehead and Larne Harbour every half an hour, with extra services to Carrickfergus and Larne Town at peak times.

On Saturdays, the service remains half-hourly, with fewer trains at peak times.

On Sundays, the service reduces to hourly operation in both directions.

| Preceding station | NI Railways | Following station |
|---|---|---|
| Whiteabbey | Northern Ireland Railways; Belfast-Larne Line | Greenisland |
| | Historical railways | |
| Bleach Green; Line open, station closed | Northern Counties Committee; Belfast-Larne | Greenisland; Line and station open |
