= NIR Class 3000 =

Class of 23 three-car diesel multiple units

Northern Ireland Railways Class 3000 "C3K"
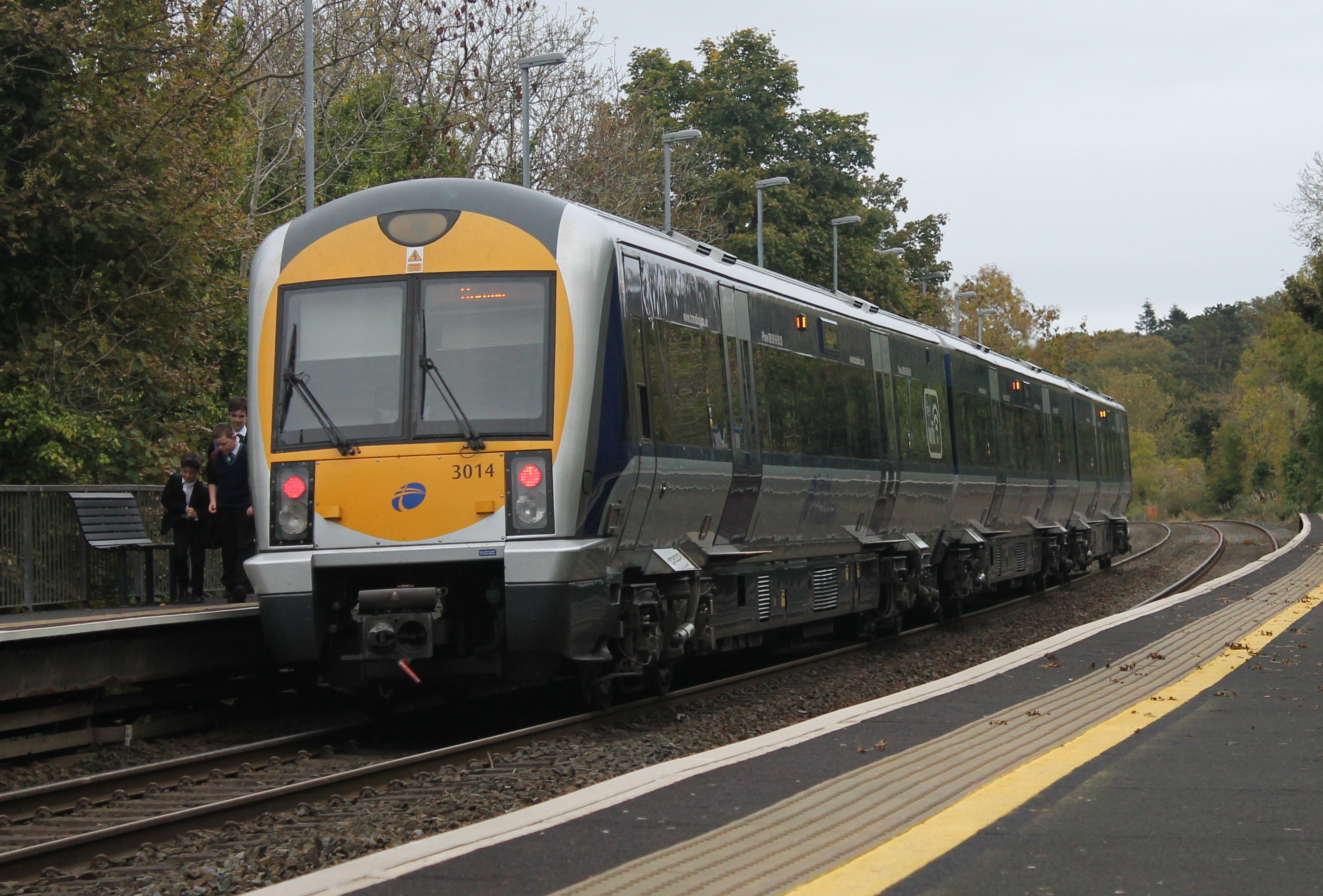
- 3000 Class DMU 3014 at Seahill in 2015

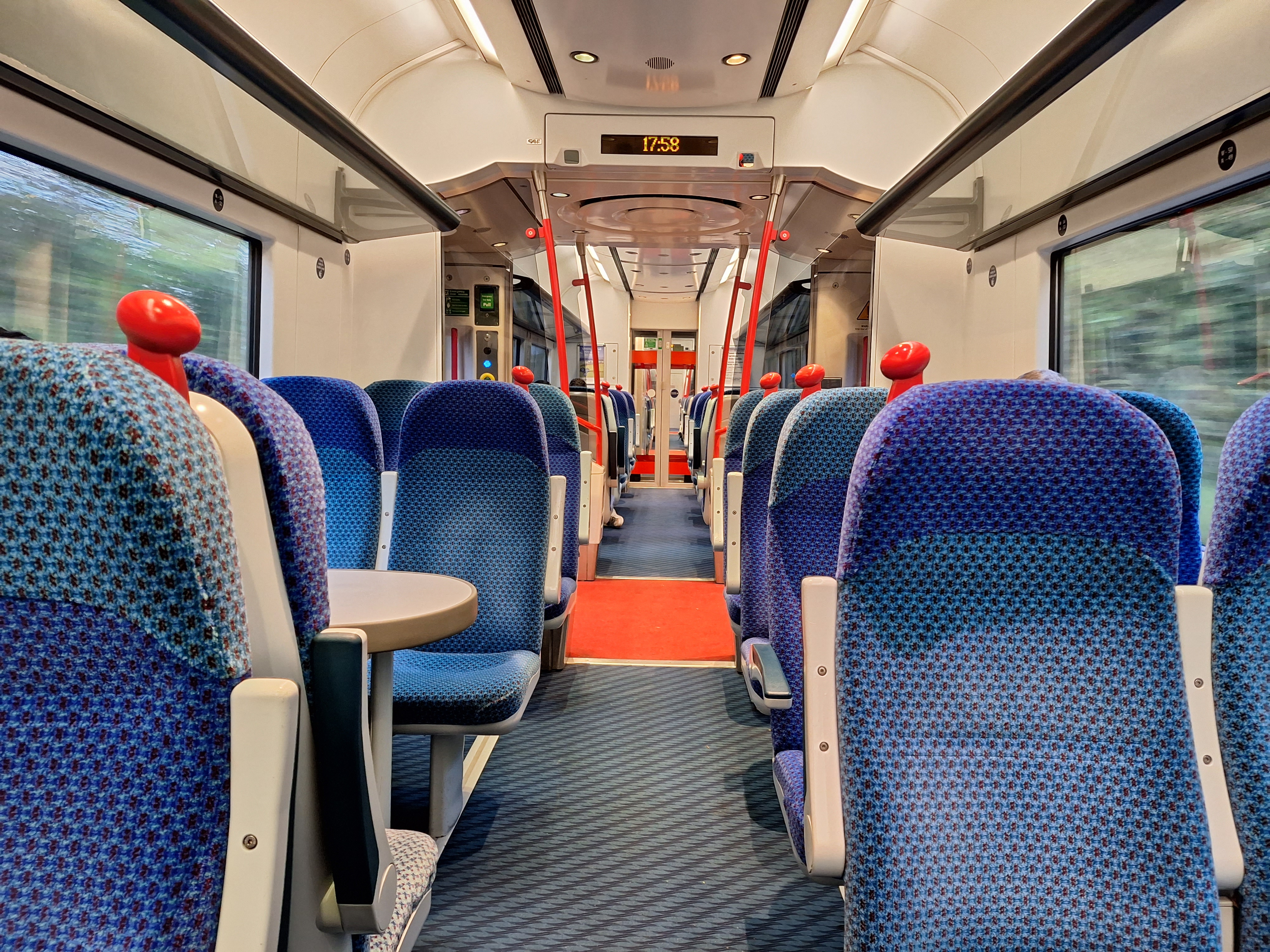
- Refurbished interior of car 3509 of set 3009
- In service: 2005–present
- Manufacturer: CAF
- Family name: CxK
- Constructed: 2004–2005
- Number built: 23 sets
- Formation: 3-car sets
- Fleet numbers: 3001–3023
- Capacity: 201 seated, 280 standing passengers
- Operator: NI Railways

Specifications
- Maximum speed: 145 km/h (90 mph)
- Prime mover: MAN D2876 LUH03
- Safety systems: AWS, TPWS, CAWS (3001-3006)
- Track gauge: 1,600 mm (5 ft 3 in)

The 3000 Class (C3K class) is a class of diesel multiple unit in service with NI Railways.

== History ==
At the beginning of the 21st century, the majority of rail services in Northern Ireland continued to be operated using Class 80 DEMUs, which had been in service since the mid-1970s, and were becoming increasingly harder to maintain. NIR had not procured new rolling stock since 1994, when, in conjunction with Iarnród Éireann, it purchased locomotives and coaches for the Enterprise service.

As part of a major investment programme in the railways in Northern Ireland, NI Railways placed an order totalling £80 million, the largest single investment in rolling stock ever made by NIR, with CAF for 23 3-car DMUs in 2002.

The new trains entered service in 2004 and 2005, gradually replacing most of the existing 80 Class units on the network (the main exception being services between Belfast and Larne, which were still provided by the Class 450 DMUs). The trains are capable of speeds of up to 145 km/h (90 mph), with 201 seats. (including 15 on tip-up seats) and have standing room for 280 passengers crush laden. The sets are numbered 3001-3023. All vehicles are powered. The individual cars are 3301 to 3323, 3501 to 3523 and 3401 to 3423. The end vehicles on each unit have cabs. 3001 is formed 3301-3501-3401 up to 3023 being formed 3323-3523-3423.

The first six units (3001-3006) are fitted with CAWS and communication equipment compatible with the rail network in the Republic of Ireland. This enables these units to be used as required on cross-border services.

== Accidents and incidents ==
- On Thursday 2 August 2007, unit 3014 hit a tractor, killing the tractor driver, and severely damaging the front of the train (3414).
- On Thursday 4 February 2016, two 3000 Class units formed a train that struck an excavator bucket on the line at Knockmore Junction, County Antrim whilst travelling at 60 miles per hour (97 km/h). The leading vehicle (3413) was severely damaged and a passenger was injured. The unit 3013 was returned to revenue service in November 2018.
- On Friday 9 August 2019, No. 3019 hit a tree just south of Antrim, damaging the front of the train (3419).
- On Wednesday 18 December 2019, No. 3006 hit a tree near Mossley West, severely damaging the leading vehicle, 3406.
- On Tuesday 14 May 2024, No. 3008 hit a tree on a Derry~Londonderry service.
- On Saturday 7 December 2024, No. 3022 hit a tree near Jordanstown while on a service to Larne.

== Refurbishment ==
Phase 1 of the refurbishment programme was begun during the financial year 2009/10 and cost an estimated £1.2 million. At the time, the trains were approximately 5–6 years old. By the time this was completed, the 20 new Class 4000 units were already coming into service. The refurbishment involved re-liverying the trains in the refreshed corporate branding. NI Railways also begun refurbishing its 3000 Class in November 2018, and completed all the twenty-three 3000's by 2021.

== Fleet details ==
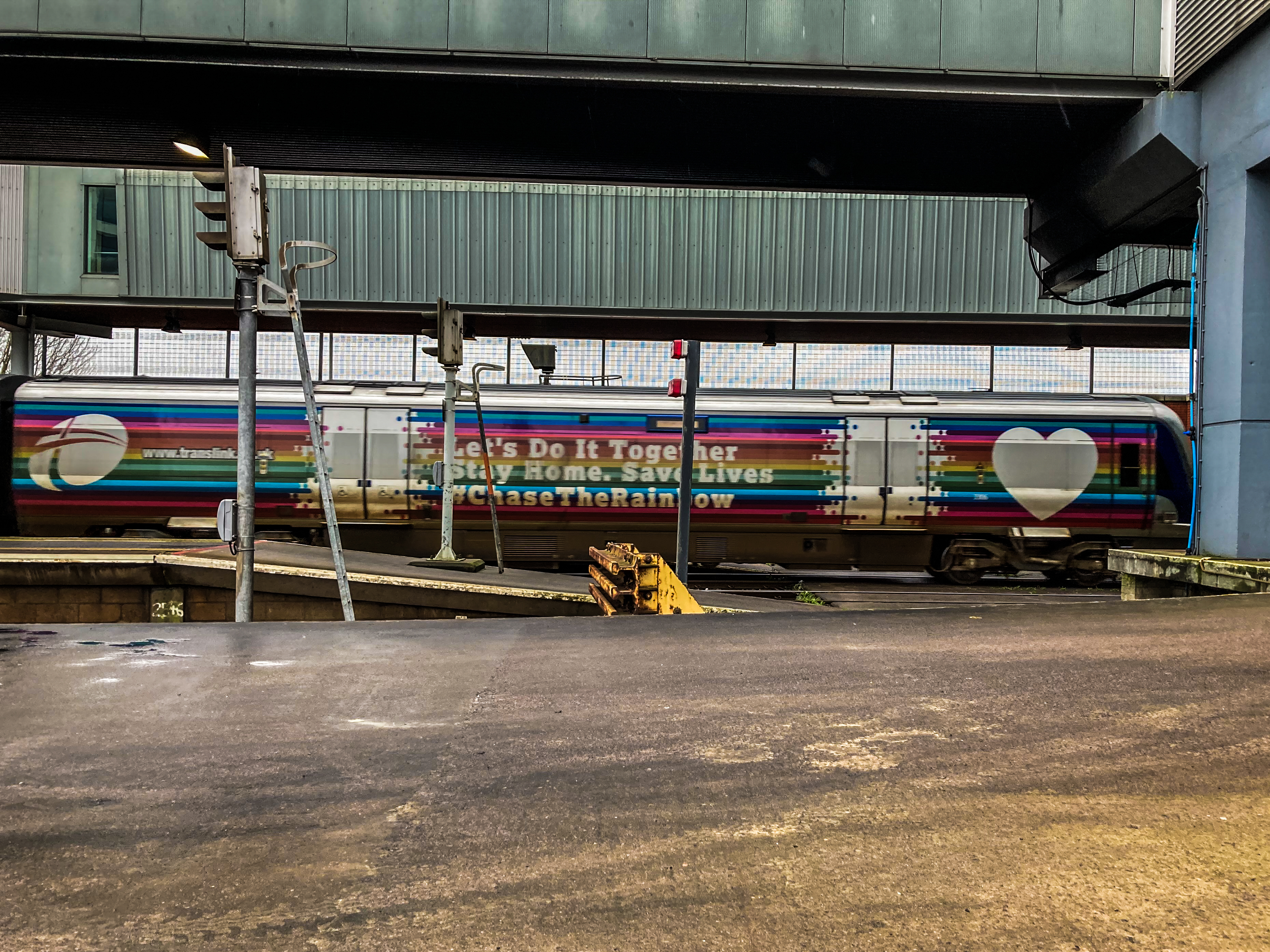
3006 and 3021 were painted into 'trainbow' liveries in 2020.

Class	Operator	No. Built	Year built	Cars per Set	Unit nos.	Notes
3000 Class	NI Railways	6	2004-2005	3	3001 - 3006	Fitted with CAWS for use on IÉ
3000 Class	NI Railways	17	2004-2005	3	3007 - 3023	

== Gallery ==
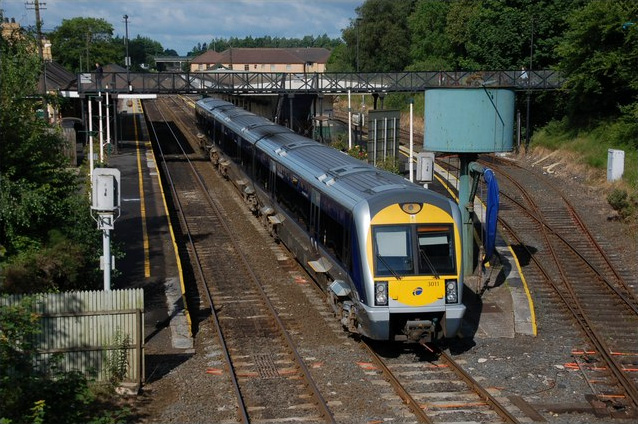
3011 pulls out of Lisburn on a Bangor service in 2007

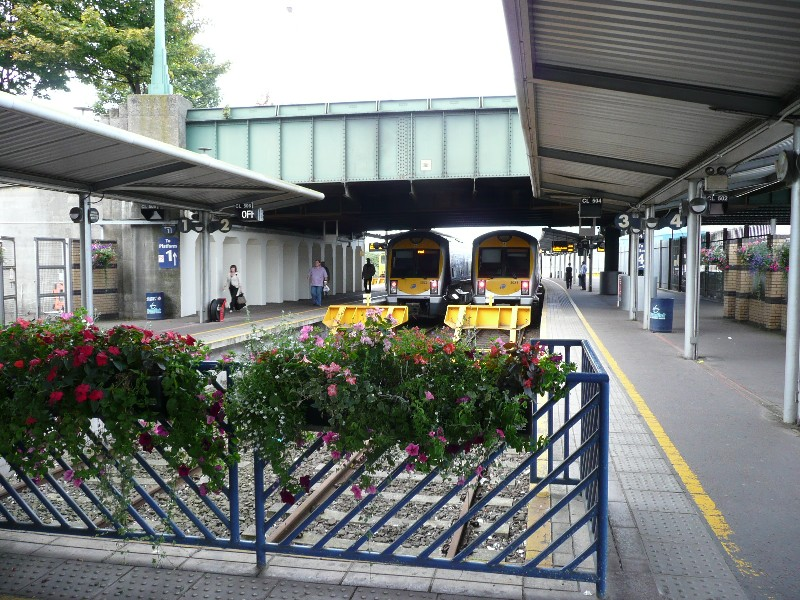
Two 3000 Class units stand at Belfast Great Victoria Street both for Larne and Portadown in 2011

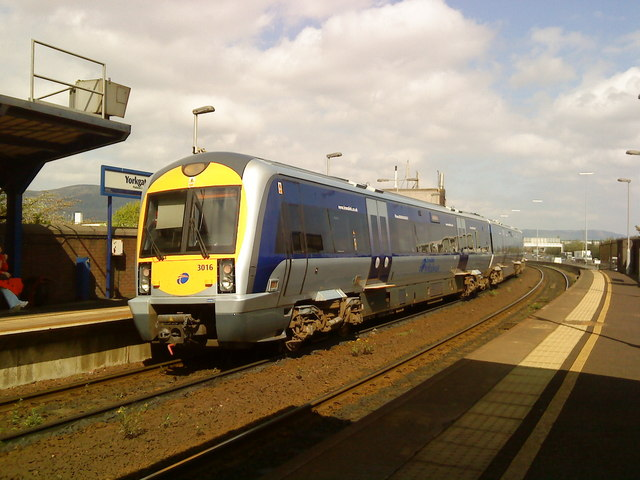
The 12.52 to Derry~Londonderry leaves Yorkgate railway station on a Whitehead Bound service in 2006

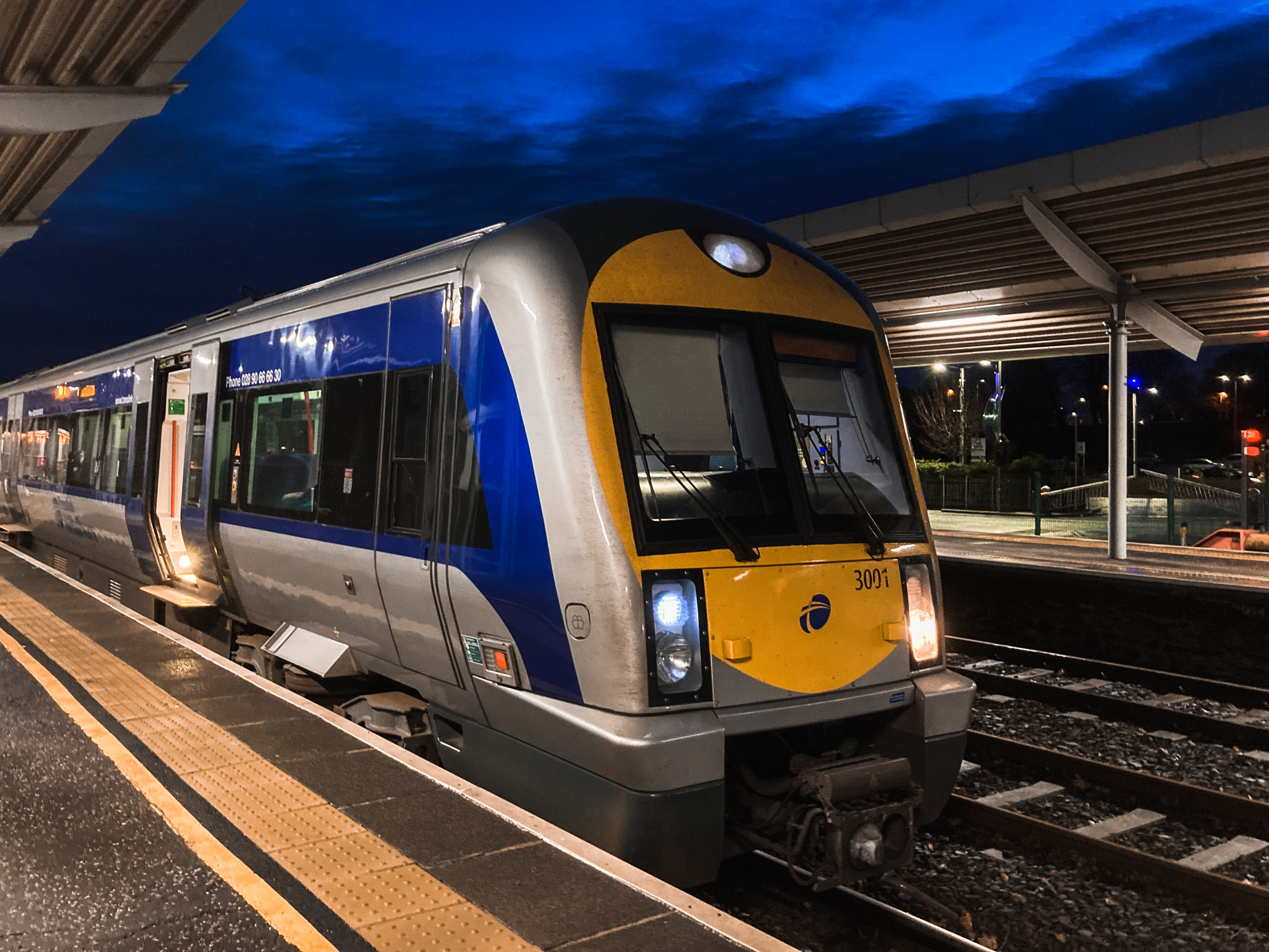
3001 at Bangor railway station in 2021
