= Bleach Green railway station =

Former railway station in Northern Ireland

Coordinates: 54.676°N 5.901°W

Bleach Green
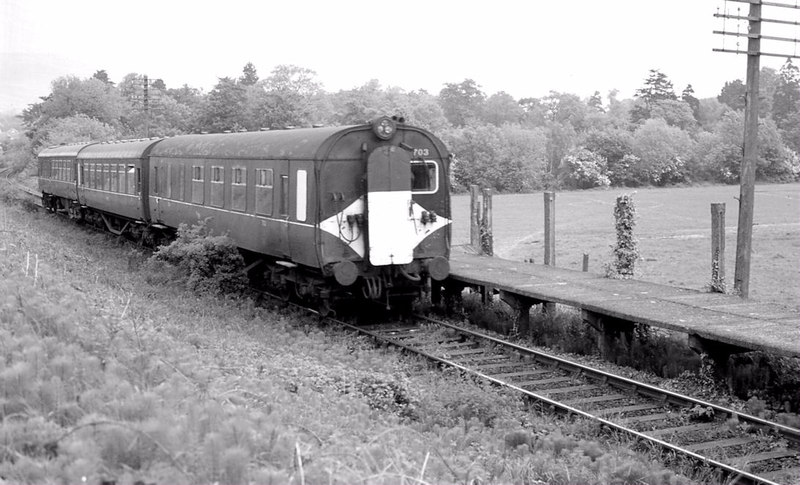
- The remains of the station in 1983

General information
- Location: Whiteabbey, County Antrim; Northern Ireland
- Owner: Northern Counties Committee; Ulster Transport Authority
- Platforms: 2

Other information
- Status: Disused

History
- Opened: 1 June 1925
- Closed: 8 May 1977
Location
- Location within Northern Ireland

Bleach Green (also known as Bleach Green Halt) is a former station operated by Northern Ireland Railways in the village of Whiteabbey, County Antrim, Northern Ireland.

The station sat near the viaducts at the junction of the Belfast-Larne railway line and Belfast-Derry railway line, but only had platforms on the line to Larne. The station originally opened in 1925. It closed in 1932 while construction work was underway on Bleach Green junction and reopened in 1934 on a new site. The station finally closed on 8 May 1977. Today, owing to later development work and track relaying, little trace of the station remains aside from space in the trackside vegetation where the platforms once were.

Preceding station	NI Railways	Following station
Whiteabbey	Northern Ireland Railways; Belfast-Larne	Jordanstown
