= Ballyrobert =

Village in County Antrim, Northern Ireland

Coordinates: 54.713962°N 6.001883°W

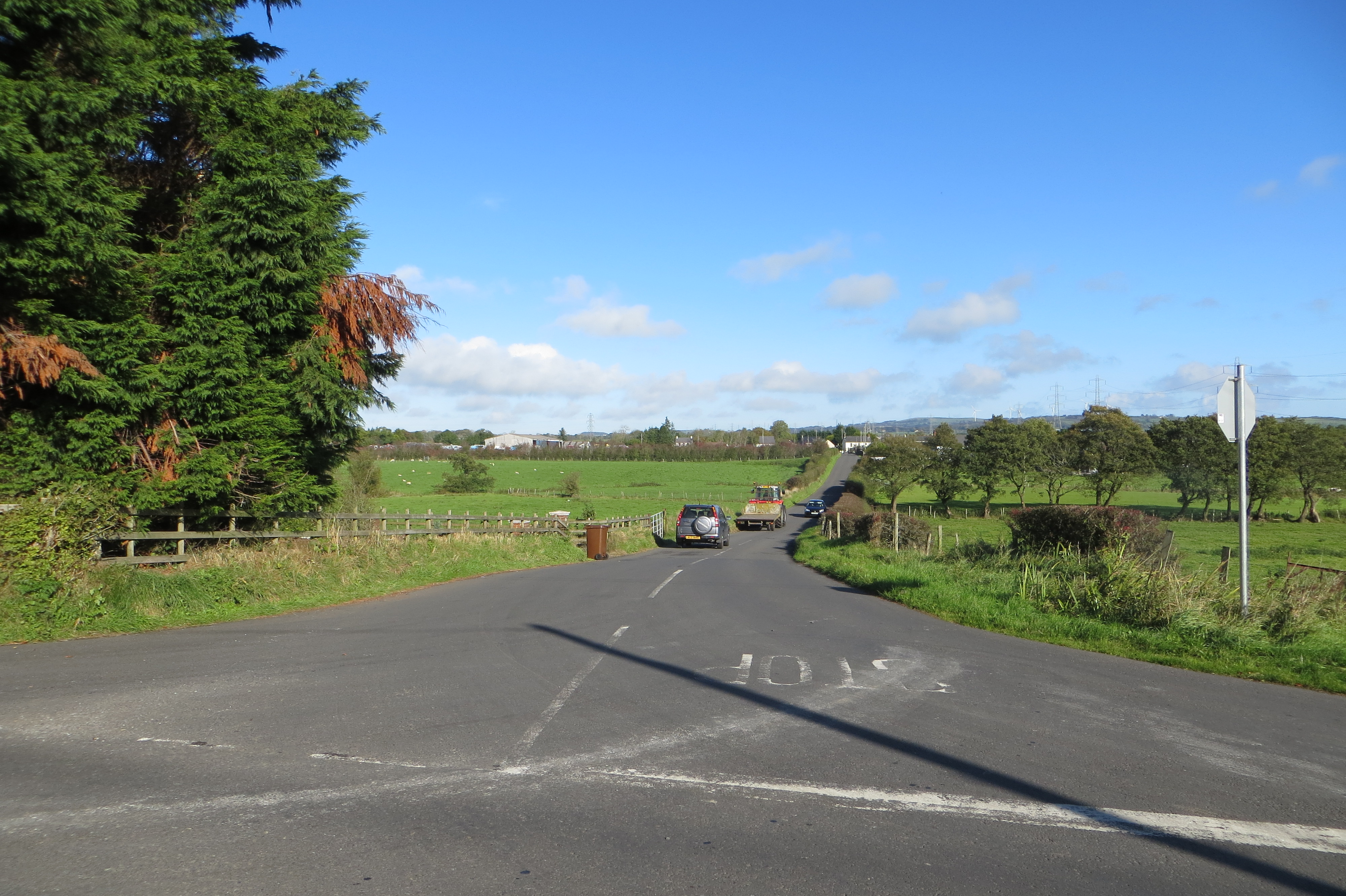
Looking towards Ballyrobert village along Springwell Road

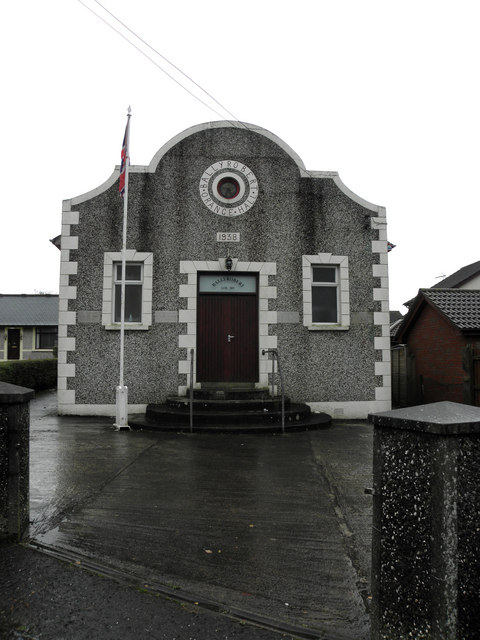
Ballyrobert Orange Hall

Ballyrobert (from Irish Baile Riobaird) is a small village in County Antrim, Northern Ireland. It is about 4 km (2.5 mi) south of Ballyclare and has developed around the junction of the Ballyrobert Road and the Mossley Road/The Longshot. It had a population of 587 people in the 2001 census. It was within the Newtownabbey Borough Council area which became the Antrim and Newtownabbey Borough Council in 2015.

== Demographics ==
Ballyrobert is classified as a small village by the Northern Ireland Statistics and Research Agency (NISRA) (i.e. with population between 500 and 1,000 people). As of the 2001 census, there were 587 people living in Ballyrobert. Of these:

- 23.6% were aged under 16 years and 14.6% were aged 60 and over
- 50.9% of the population were male and 49.1% were female
- 4.4% were from a Catholic background and 93.5% were from a Protestant background
- 1.7% of people aged 16–74 were unemployed

== Schools ==
The local school in Ballyrobert, the Thompson Primary School, is for both males and females aged between 4 and 12 years.

== See also ==
- List of towns and villages in Northern Ireland
