= Continuous Automatic Warning System =

Warning system for train drivers used in Ireland

The Continuous Automatic Warning System (CAWS) is a form of cab signalling and train protection system used in Ireland to help train drivers observe and obey lineside signals.

CAWS has been in use on Iarnród Éireann diesel trains since 1984. All NIR trains operating cross-border must also be fitted with CAWS. Coded track circuits, which form the basis of the system (see below), are installed on all Dublin Suburban and Intercity routes to Cork, Limerick, and Athlone and as far as the border on the Belfast line.

This system is of American origin, being originally supplied by US&S, then a division of Westinghouse Air Brake Company (WABCO). Current equipment is supplied by SASIB, a division of Alstom.

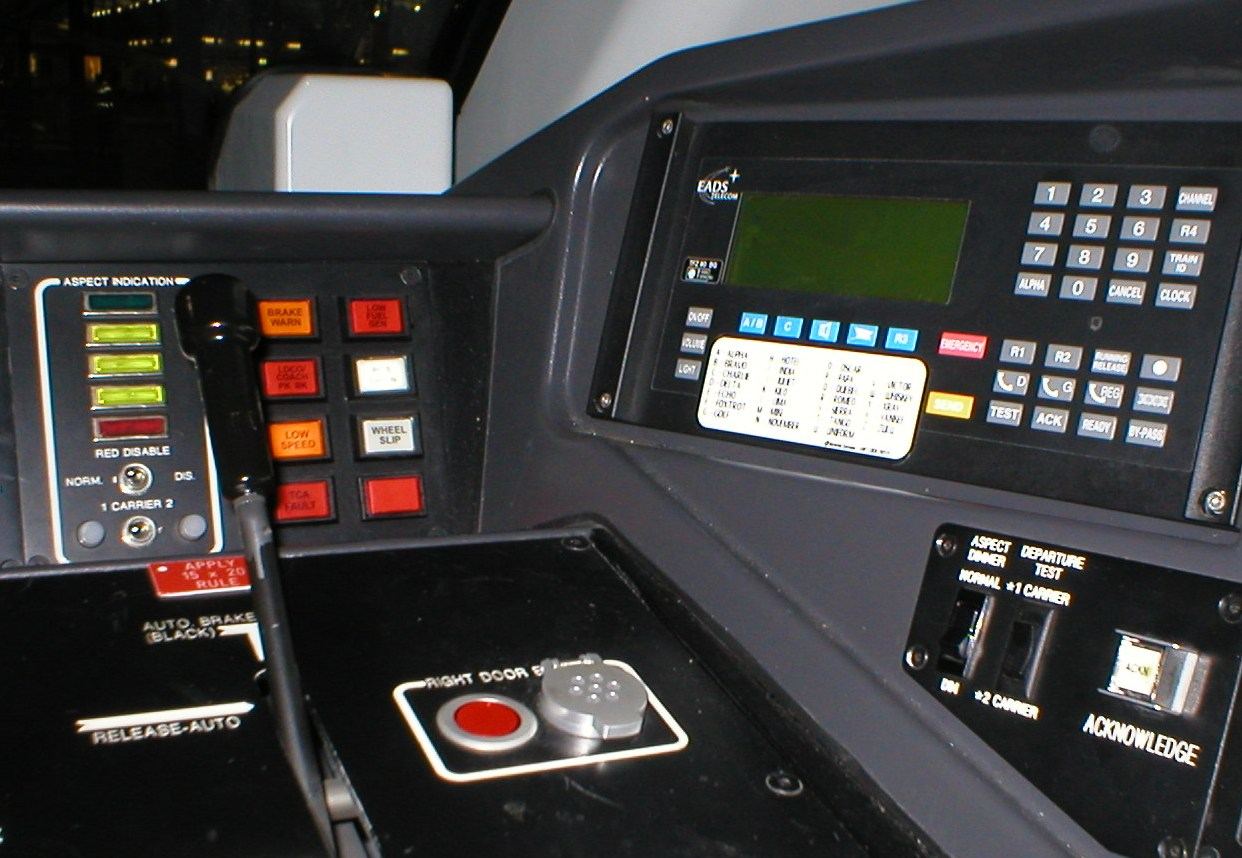
CAWS ADU on left, Acknowledge & Pre-departure test switches on right

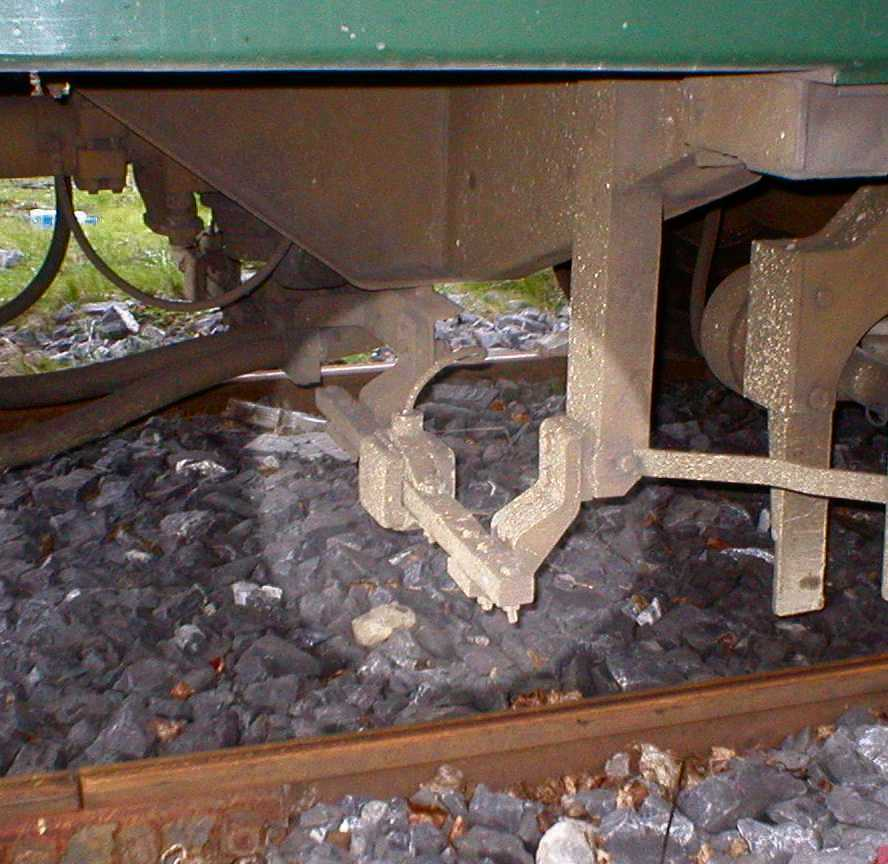
CAWS/ATP pick-up coil

== Principles of operation ==
CAWS repeats the aspects shown by the lineside colour light signals on an aspect display unit (ADU) inside the driver's cab. The ADU continuously displays the aspect that was shown by the previous signal until updated about 350 metres before the next signal. The ADU then displays the aspect shown by that signal.

A change of ADU display to a less restrictive aspect (e.g., double yellow to green) is termed an upgrade, while a change to a more restrictive aspect (e.g., single yellow to red) is called a downgrade. Any change of ADU display is accompanied by an audible indication. A momentary audible ‘warble’ sound indicates an upgrade. A downgrade is accompanied by a continuous audible tone and the illumination of the Acknowledge Switch that must be pressed by the driver within seven seconds to prevent an automatic brake application occurring for one minute. This is not recoverable until the time has expired. Acknowledgement by the driver within the first seven seconds immediately silences the tone.

== Technical details ==
The system consists of coded track circuits and on-board equipment. The coded track circuits transmit information about the signal aspect to the on-board equipment via two pick-up coils mounted on the front of the train, one over each rail.

The 50 Hz carrier signal is modulated with pulsed square wave codes according to the signal aspect. No code is generated for a red aspect. The system is therefore fail-safe, since loss of code will result in a red indication on the ADU.

- Codes: 50, 120 and 180 cpm (cycles per minute).
  - Translated by the CAWS as Yellow, Double Yellow and Green.

In electrified DART areas, a different carrier frequency of 83.3 Hz is used to avoid interference from 50 Hz power line frequency. There is also a greater range of codes because they also control the automatic train protection on the DART units.

- Codes: 50, 75, 120, 180, 270 and 420 cpm.
  - Translated by the CAWS as Yellow, Green, Yellow, Green, Double Yellow and Green.
  - Translated by the DART ATP as 29 km/h, 30 km/h, 50 km/h, 50 km/h, 75 km/h and 100 km/h speed limits.

Diesel drivers have to select the appropriate carrier frequency when moving to or from an electrified area. "Carrier 1" (50 Hz) is used in non-electrified areas and "Carrier 2" (83.3 Hz) is used in electrified areas.

== Advantages ==
Because CAWS is a continuous system, an upgrade can occur anywhere between signals. The driver may then accelerate in the knowledge that the signal ahead has changed to a better aspect, even though it may not yet be visible. Similarly, the driver can quickly act upon an unexpected downgrade, which may be the result of the signalman having returned the signal ahead to red in an emergency.

== Disadvantages ==
Since CAWS is dependent on track circuits for its operation, it cannot be applied where axle counters are used for train detection (i.e., "mini-CTC" areas) without the additional cost.

CAWS does not act in the event of a signal being passed at danger if the Red aspect has been acknowledged.

== See also ==
- Automatic Train Protection
- Automatic Warning System
- Pulse code cab signaling
