= Belfast–Derry line =

Northern Irish railway line

Derry~Londonderry Line
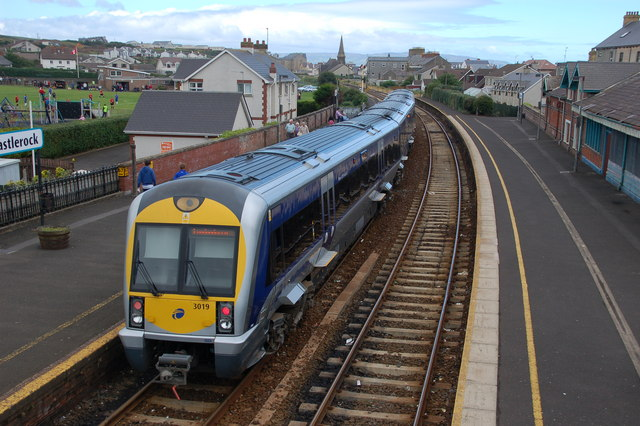
- NI Railways Class 3000 at Castlerock

Overview
- Status: Operational
- Owner: Translink
- Locale: Northern Ireland
- Termini: Belfast Grand Central; Derry~Londonderry / Coleraine
- Stations: 15

Service
- Type: Heavy rail; Commuter rail
- System: NI Railways
- Services: Belfast-Derry; Belfast-Coleraine
- Operator: NI Railways
- Rolling stock: Class 3000 (C3K); Class 4000 (C4K)
- Ridership: 4,578,499 (2023/24)

Technical
- Number of tracks: Double track from Belfast to Monkstown; Single line; with passing loops from Monkstown to Derry~Londonderry
- Track gauge: 1,600 mm (5 ft 3 in) Irish gauge
- Electrification: Un-electrified
- Operating speed: 90 mph (140 km/h)
Route map
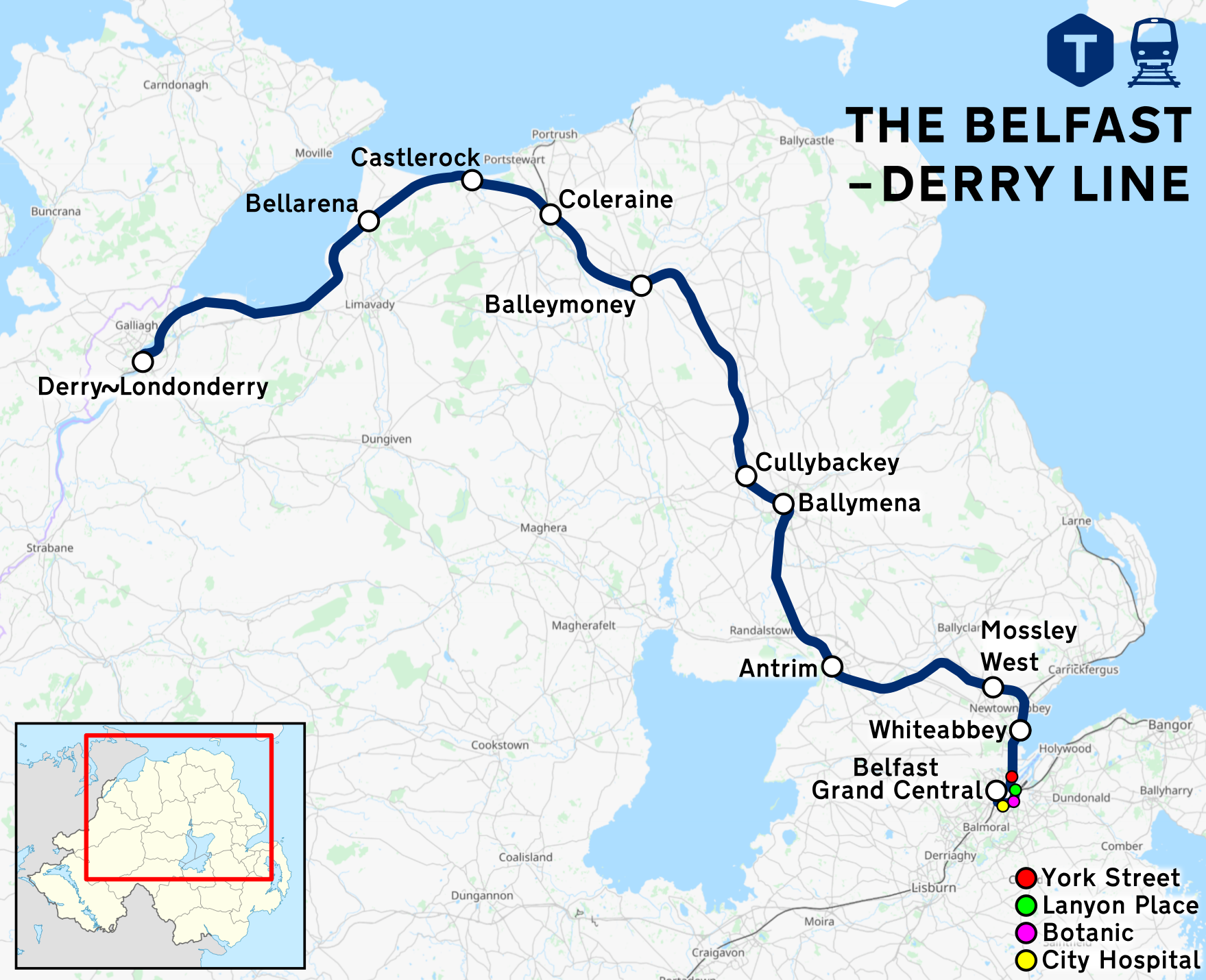
(Click to expand)

The Belfast–Derry line (referred to as the Derry~Londonderry Line by NI Railways) is an intercity railway line, running from Belfast to Derry in Northern Ireland. It is the westernmost railway line in the United Kingdom. Like all other railway lines in Northern Ireland, it is not electrified and all trains are diesel-powered.

== Route ==
The line links Belfast, Northern Ireland's capital city, with Derry, the second largest city via large rural towns such as Ballymena, Coleraine and Antrim. The line is double-track on the short section it shares with the Belfast–Larne line, but is composed primarily of single track from Monkstown to Derry with passing points at Templepatrick, Antrim, Magherabeg, Ballymena, Killagan, Ballymoney, Coleraine and Bellarena.

The line is the busiest single track railway line in the United Kingdom, carrying over 4 million passengers per annum. Michael Palin has described the line as one of the most beautiful rail journeys in the world.

=== Belfast Grand Central-York Street ===
The railway line begins at Belfast Grand Central Station, located near the city centre of Belfast, the line diverges onto two tracks at Westlink Junction, running alongside the Bangor and Larne Lines to City Hospital and Botanic. After leaving Botanic the line reaches Belfast Lanyon Place, a major interchange station which opened in 1976.

The Bangor Line diverges shortly after leaving Lanyon Place, with services to Derry and Larne crossing the Dargan Bridge, also known as the 'Cross Harbour Link' which opened in 1994. Previously between 1978 and 2001, the line between the Bleach Green viaduct and Antrim was closed, and services to Derry operated via Crumlin, Glenavy, Ballinderry and Lisburn. A skeleton service continued on the Lisburn–Antrim line until 2003, when the line and its stations were closed. This section of railway is now used solely for driver training or other operational requirements e.g. special services to major events.

The Dargan Bridge is single track, with a passing loop located on the west bank of the Lagan, just before arriving into York Street which opened in 2024 replacing Yorkgate station.

=== York Street-Antrim ===
To the north of the station is York Road maintenance Depot, where most NIR and Enterprise units are maintained. It is also home to the NIR Class 111s.

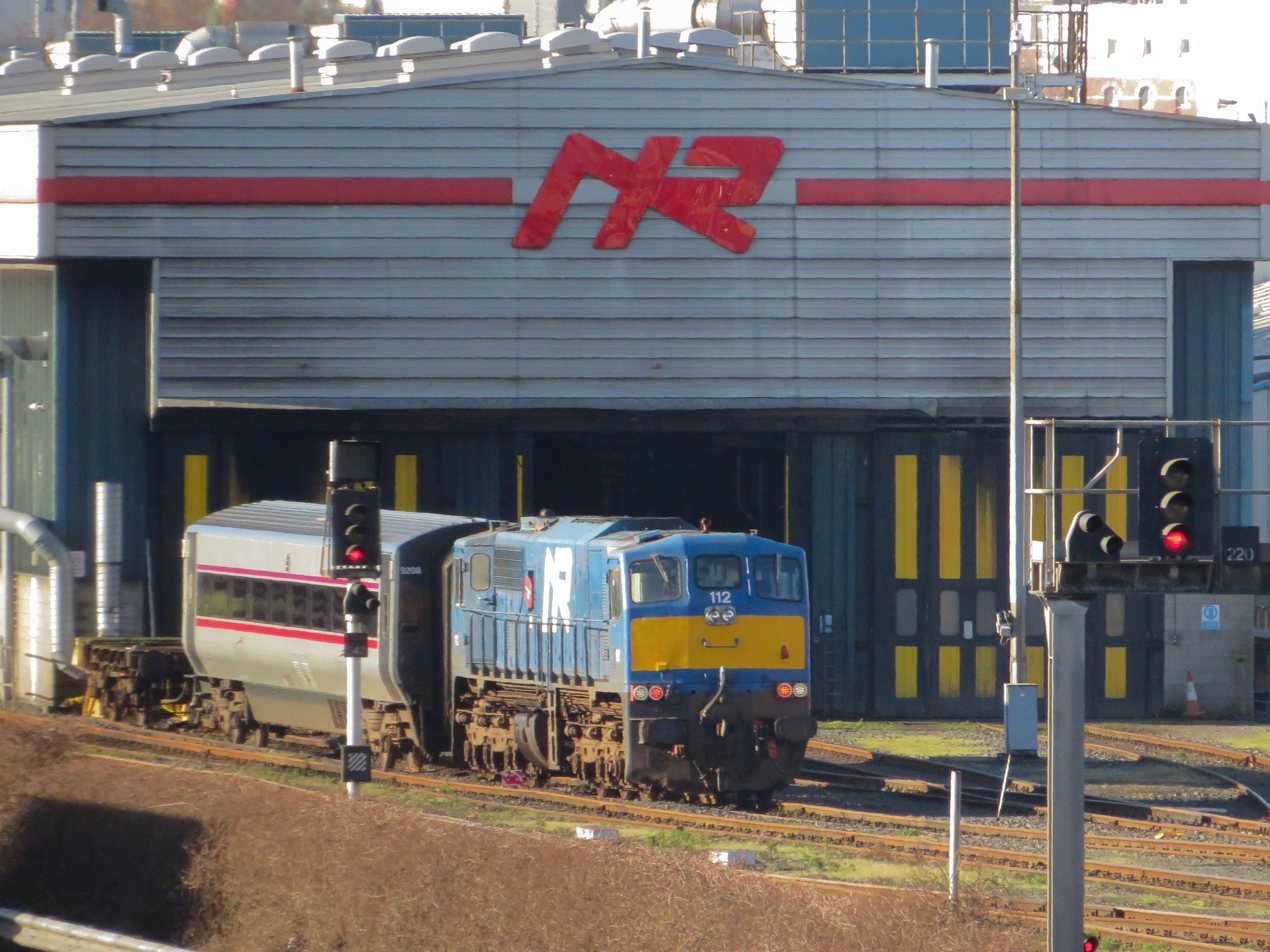
York Road Depot (2017)

Heading north is the Fortwilliam Traincare Depot, which opened in 2005 to maintain the new C3K and C4K diesel units.

Although technically on the line, Whiteabbey only sees one weekday morning service from Coleraine, one weekday morning service from Derry~Londonderry, and two weekday evening services to Coleraine calling. No other Belfast-Derry services call at Whiteabbey outside of special circumstances. NI Railways refrain from allowing more services to stop at Whiteabbey to help reduce journey times to Derry/Londonderry.

At the Bleach Green Viaduct, the Larne line diverges to Jordanstown, with services to Derry-Londonderry continuing northwards on a single track line. There is however a passing loop at Monkstown, shortly before reaching Mossley West. This station was opened in 2001 when services were restored to the Bleach Green-Antrim section of the line.

On the single-track section between Mossley West and Antrim, the line reaches its maximum operational speed of 90mph. On the approach to Antrim the former Lisburn-Antrim line diverges to the left. Antrim station still retains the original bay platform for the Lisburn-Antrim line, but this has been shortened to give more space to the adjacent bus station. The possibility of reopening the Lisburn-Antrim line as part of a circular route, with a halt at Aldergrove for Belfast International Airport, has been discussed. Antrim underwent a major refurbishment in 2008 to become an integrated bus and rail hub. In total, the station has 4 platforms - two of which are in regular use, and two of which are disused.

=== Antrim-Coleraine ===
The line from Antrim to Coleraine is single-track, with passing loops at Magherabeg, Ballymena, Killagan and Ballymoney. The maximum operational speed on this section of the line is 70mph.

Ballymena opened in 1848, however the current building dates back to 1982 during a modernisation programme by NI Railways. The station serves as a passing point on the line and as an integrated 'Bus-Rail Hub'. The line continues to head north, stopping at the village of Cullybackey, before continuing to the town of Ballymoney.

Ballymoney station opened in 1855. The station was rebuilt between 1901 and 1902 to designs by Berkeley Deane Wise in a Cottage style. The cast ironwork forming the station canopy was provided by MacFarlane's Saracen Foundry of Glasgow, and the cast iron footbridge was provided by the Sun Foundry of George Smith and Company in Glasgow. The station also served as the southern terminus of the narrow gauge Ballycastle Railway, which closed in 1950. The line continues north to Coleraine, the station was opened by the Ballymena, Ballymoney, Coleraine and Portrush Junction Railway on 4 December 1855 to designs by the architect Charles Lanyon. A similar range of buildings was provided on the east side of the tracks in the 1880s. The shared train and bus station building has a distinctive rotunda with a high arched entrance, by GM Design Associates. The line has two platforms, with three sidings, which typically hold trains during the night to operate early morning through services to Belfast Grand Central. It also serves as an interchange for the Portrush line.

=== Coleraine-Derry/Londonderry ===
Leaving Coleraine, the Portrush Line diverges to the right, with services to Derry/Londonderry continuing over a bascule bridge over the River Bann. The line continues through to Castlerock, the station opened on 18 July 1853 and was built to a design by the architect Charles Lanyon. It comprised a single-storey red brick on the 'up' platform. There is a modern two storey addition to this in a similar style.

As part of works to upgrade the Coleraine-Derry railway line, the passing loop at Castlerock station was discontinued and replaced with a new loop at Bellarena. The station signal box, which was the last full-time mechanical signal box on the NIR network and the last to use block tokens, was subsequently closed on 2 November 2016. The down platform, despite receiving a complete refurbishment two years prior, has now been taken out of service and the track lifted. All services calling at Castlerock now use the former up platform. Just after Castlerock station there are two tunnels created during an event known as the Great Blast in October 1845. Castlerock tunnel is 668 yards (611 m) long and is the longest operational railway tunnel in Northern Ireland. After passing through a short opening trains pass through the shorter Downhill tunnel which is 301 yards (275 m) in length.

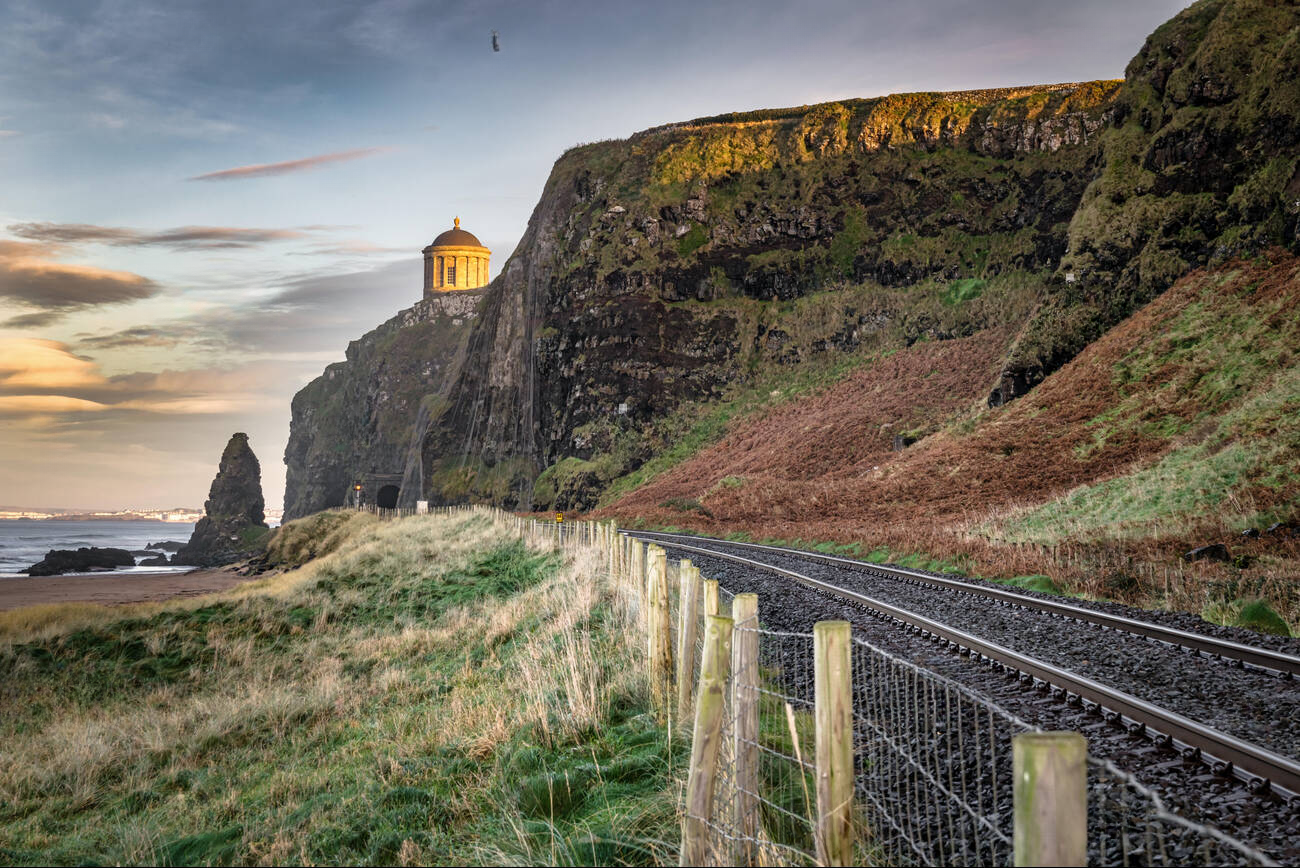
Downhill Strand, with Mussenden Temple standing in the background (2025)

Upon exiting the Downhill tunnel, the line passes along Downhill beach, with Michael Palin describing the section of track between Coleraine-Derry as ''one of the most beautiful rail journeys in the world''. The line passes below Mussenden Temple, Perched on the cliffs overlooking Downhill Strand. The temple was built in 1785 and forms part of the Downhill Demesne. Over the years the erosion of the cliff face at Downhill has brought Mussenden Temple ever closer to the edge, and in 1997 the National Trust carried out cliff stabilisation work to prevent the loss of the building.

The line runs along the Umbra Nature Reserve before reaching Bellarena station. In late 2015, work started on a new station at Bellarena, replacing the original 1853 station with one on a new site located on the other side of the adjacent level crossing. The new station opened to traffic on Monday 21 March 2016. Unlike the old station, the new station has two platforms, with a new passing loop replacing the one originally at Castlerock railway station. The original station features are still in existence and can easily be seen from the new station. The line follows Lough Foyle, passing City of Derry Airport, Foyle Bridge and The Peace Bridge before winding into Derry-Londonderry, the northwestern terminus of the line.

=== Derry/Londonderry ===
The original Londonderry Waterside Station was opened on 29 December 1852 by Steven Alfred John Campbell, a well-known banker of the time. It was rebuilt into the current building by the Belfast & Northern Counties Railway in 1874.

As a result of a series of closures of the other lines, Waterside was the only station to have survived closure by 1965. Services were reduced and the track layout was severely rationalised. The station name was changed to Londonderry, as the suffix Waterside became redundant upon closure of the city's two other railway termini. Although this is the station's official name the platform signs at the station read Derry~Londonderry while the destination signs on Northern Ireland Railways trains read Derry/Londonderry. The station was damaged in two terrorist attacks in the 1970s forcing it to be closed on 24 February 1980. A third station of the same name replaced the larger terminus in 1980.

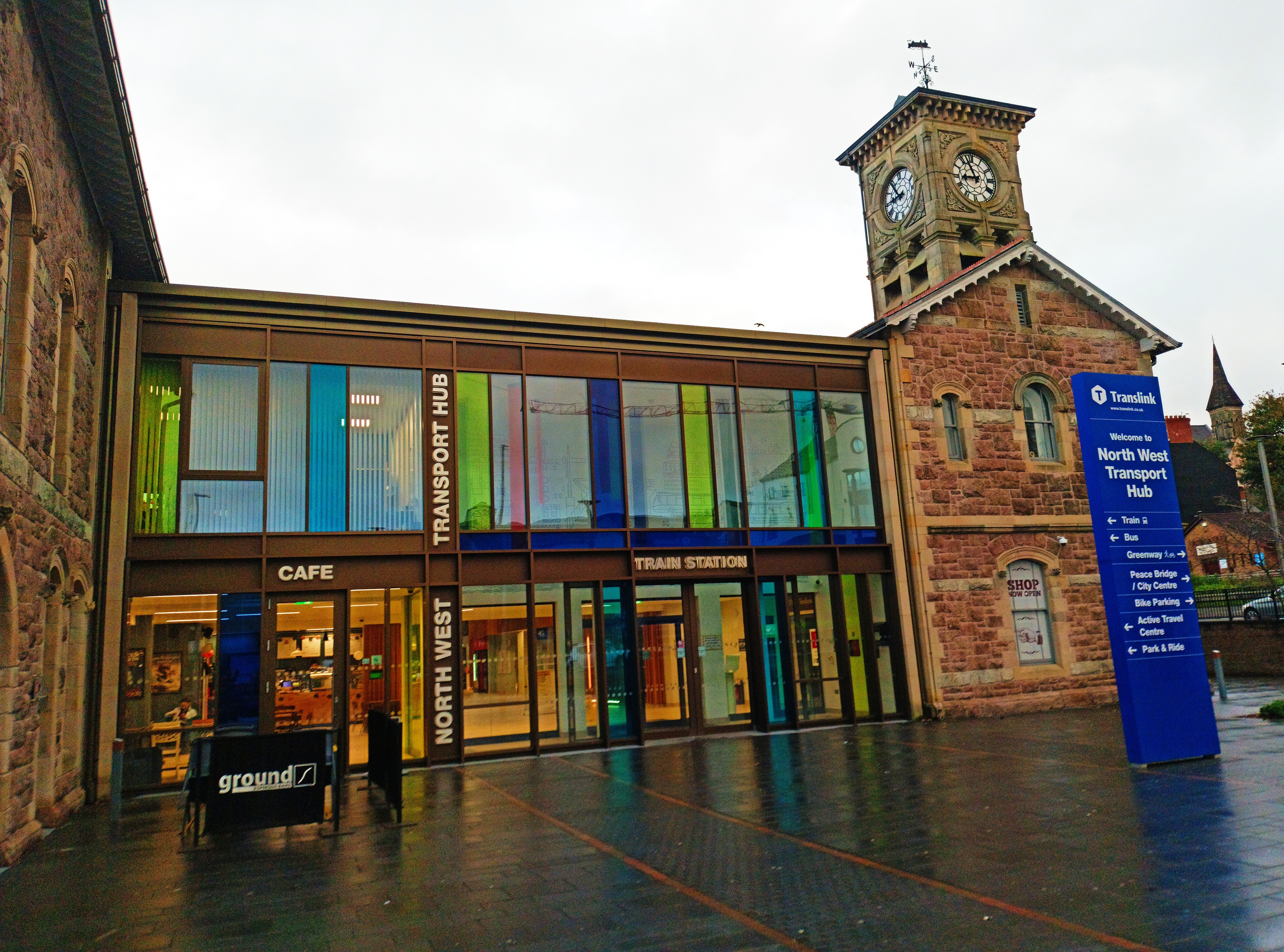
Derry~Londonderry Train Station, the northwestern terminus of the line

On 6 October 2016, Translink confirmed that the railway would be returning to the former BNCR Waterside station which will be used as a new transport hub for the city. The 1980 station closed on 8 October 2019 to allow the completion of work on the new station on the former site just to the north.

The new station is part of the North West Transport Hub and is on the site of the old Waterside Station. It opened for rail traffic on 21 October 2019, with the 1980s station being demolished on 5–6 December 2019.

Derry/Londonderry has the longest platforms on the NIR Network, at 258.3 metres in length

== Current service ==
Weekday and Saturday services on the line operate hourly from Belfast Grand Central to Derry~Londonderry (and vice versa), with most trains running the full route. On weekdays (Monday–Friday), 20 northbound trains per day (tpd) operate between Belfast Grand Central and Coleraine, with 16 continuing to Derry~Londonderry. Southbound, 19 tpd run from Coleraine to Belfast Grand Central, including 16 originating in Derry~Londonderry and one final late service terminating at Belfast Lanyon Place. On Saturdays, 16 northbound tpd run to Coleraine, with 15 extending to Derry~Londonderry and one additional early-morning service starting at Coleraine for Derry~Londonderry. Southbound, 16 tpd depart Coleraine for Belfast, including 15 from Derry~Londonderry and one final evening service from Derry~Londonderry terminating at Coleraine. Late-night and peak-time services on weekdays and Saturdays occasionally start or terminate at Coleraine or Lanyon Place to manage demand. An hourly shuttle connects Portrush to the main line at Coleraine.

On Sundays, services from Belfast Grand Central operate hourly but alternate destinations every hour between Derry~Londonderry and Portrush, resulting in a two-hourly service for stations beyond Coleraine. 13 tpd run northbound to Coleraine, with 6 extending to Derry~Londonderry, while southbound services mirror this pattern

== Timetable Discrimination ==
Many lobby groups and local politicians in the city of Derry have accused Translink of 'timetable discrimination', with Derry/Londonderry receiving 2400 fewer services compared to the town of Coleraine every year, despite the fact that Derry has 70,000 more people than Coleraine. Into the West identified six issues that could be easily rectified and which, with the exception of issue 2, could be fixed by timetabling changes without the need for any track improvements or infrastructural investment.

== Upgrade and future ==
In 2011, it was planned to reduce services on the Coleraine to Derry~Londonderry section to five services, in each direction on weekdays, to facilitate safety improvement works during refurbishment of the line due to commence in 2012, but the £75 million that it was to cost was unavailable. This led to fears that the line would be permanently closed. Regional Development minister Danny Kennedy relocated funding from the A5 dualling project to the railway upgrade project, allowing for a 3-phase upgrade.

Phase 1 saw the line close for nine months to completely relay two sections (Coleraine to Castlerock; and Eglinton to Derry), extending the life of the remaining section by converting the jointed track to continuous welded rail, elimination of wet spots, and essential bridge repairs. This was completed by 2013, and timetable changes resulted in a morning train reaching Derry before 9 a.m. for the first time since Northern Ireland Railways took control of the network in the 1960s.

Phase 2 saw the passing loop removed and the 'down' track lifted at Castlerock, replaced with a new loop further down the line at Bellarena halt. New signalling was introduced, and the signal boxes at Castlerock and Waterside, Derry closed, with the line operating under absolute block. An hourly service between Belfast and Derry was introduced in 2017.

Phase 3 will include rail renewal between Castlerock and Eglinton, the introduction of a 90 mph (140 km/h) line speed between Castlerock and Derry and other works, however funding for this part of the project is doubtful for the foreseeable future.

Other future plans for the Derry line include the reinstatement of the double line from Antrim to Ballymena, and the doubling of the track from Monkstown to Templepatrick. The route terminus in Derry was relocated in 2019 when the former Belfast and Northern Counties Railway Waterside station reopened, replacing the 1980 terminus.

== Railway engineering feature ==
Coleraine has a bascule bridge for the railway over the navigable River Bann. Just after Castlerock station there are two tunnels created during an event known as the Great Blast in October 1845. Castlerock tunnel is 668 yards (611 m) long and is the longest operational railway tunnel in Northern Ireland. After passing through a short opening trains pass through the shorter Downhill tunnel which is 301 yards (275 m) in length.

== Signalling ==
Signalling on the line from Belfast Grand Central to Slaught level crossing (just south of Ballymena station) is controlled by the Belfast Lanyon Place control terminal. From Kellswater South, the signalling and level crossings are controlled by the Coleraine signal cabin. Following the signalling upgrade in 2016, the line north of Coleraine is no longer controlled by electric token, instead being centralised in the Coleraine signal box. The signal boxes at Castlerock and Waterside, which previously controlled the token system, have now been closed. The whole of the Belfast to Derry line is now controlled by colour light signals, the last semaphore signals at Castlerock station being removed after the 2016 signalling upgrade.

The signal box at Coleraine will be moved to Lanyon Place upon completion of the Belfast Hub project.

== Rolling stock ==
Due to capacity issues on the line, Northern Ireland Railways announced they would be purchasing 21 extra carriages from Spanish manufacturer CAF. These units entered service in 2021. The line is typically served by 6 car Class 4000 sets, however, 3 car Class 3000s and Class 4000s sometimes operate on the line.
