= Eden, County Antrim =

Coordinates: 54.72895°N 005.77451°W

Eden
- Location within Northern Ireland
- Population: 1,995 (Eden 2 Super Output Area – 2001 Census)
- District: Mid and East Antrim
- County: County Antrim
- Country: Northern Ireland
- Sovereign state: United Kingdom
- Post town: CARRICKFERGUS
- Postcode district: BT38
- Dialling code: 028
- UK Parliament: East Antrim
- NI Assembly: East Antrim

Eden is a residential settlement on the eastern edge of Carrickfergus in County Antrim, Northern Ireland, located within a larger electoral ward area of the same name. It is intersected by the Larne Road, a small section of the extensive Antrim Coast Road that connects Carrickfergus to Whitehead and the major ferry port of Larne.

== Community projects ==
In April 2008, Carrickfergus Borough Council established the Eden Allotments, a five hectare allotment site intended to be a hub of community activity as well as promoting gardening activities and 'home-grown' cultivation of vegetables. It has been highly publicised in local newspapers and has received praise from local government for its environmentally friendly aims. It is currently believed to be the largest allotment site on the island of Ireland.

== Education ==
Eden is served by Eden Primary School. The school is located on a 3.4-acre plot of land within residential Eden and takes children from a larger surrounding catchment area which includes Carrickfergus and occasionally Whitehead.

== Transport ==
Eden was served by Eden railway station until 1977, when NI Railways nationalised their services and closed many railway stations, including nearby Kilroot railway station. There is now no station between Downshire and Whitehead.

== Notable residents ==
- International footballer Willie Irvine (and most likely his brother Bobby) was born in Eden before moving to the Sunnylands estate in Carrickfergus.

== See also ==
- Carrickfergus
- List of villages in Northern Ireland
