= Carrickfergus Sailing Club =

UK yacht club

Coordinates: 54.7105°N 5.8099°W

Carrickfergus Sailing Club is a sailing club in Carrickfergus, Northern Ireland on the north shore of Belfast Lough. The club was founded in 1866 as Carrickfergus Amateur Rowing Club. The clubhouse moved from the building on stilts beside Carrickfergus Harbour to its current location beside Carrickfergus Marina in 1984. It is one of several clubs that form the Belfast Lough Yachting Conference.

In June 2012, the clubhouse was destroyed by a fire thought to have been caused by an electrical fault. A new clubhouse was opened in July 2014.

== Racing ==
The club runs races primarily for IRC, PY, White Sail, Flying Fifteen, Squib and Ruffian 23 classes. Several racing series are run throughout the year - from March to late October.

There are several other one-day and two-day events for cruisers throughout the season. These include the Castle Cup, Menagerie Race and the Mid Lough Open (the latter run in association with Royal Ulster and Ballyholme Yacht Clubs).

The club also hosts open regional and national level events for various classes. This has previously included events involving Flying Fifteen, Squib, Topper, Mirror, J/24 and Ruffian 23 classes.
