= Belfast Lough =

Large, intertidal sea inlet on the east coast of Northern Ireland

Belfast Lough Loch Lao (Irish) Bilfawst Loch (Ulster-Scots)
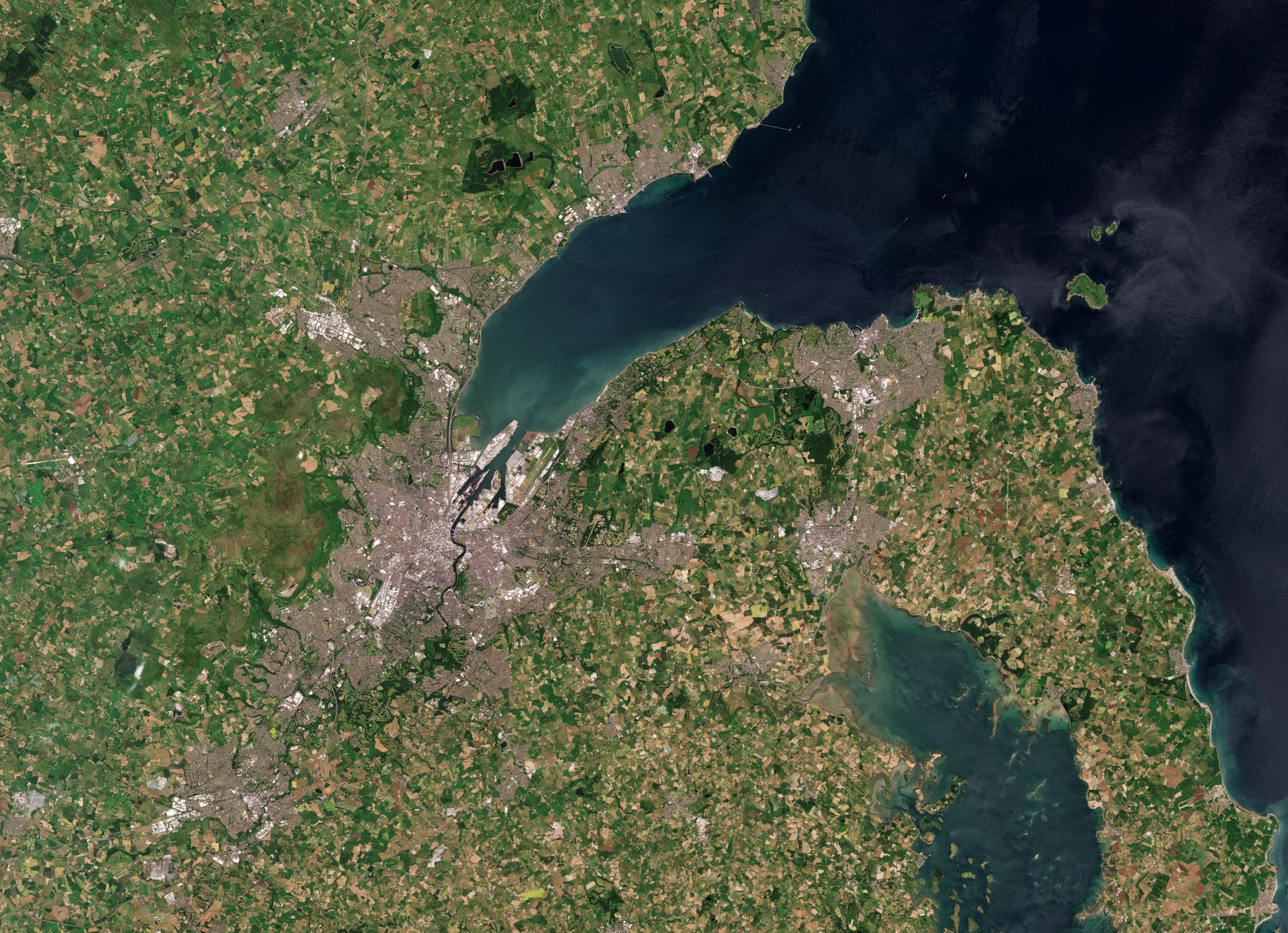
- Satellite photo

- Location within Greater Belfast
- Location: Northern Ireland
- Coordinates: 54.691°N 5.785°W

Ramsar Wetland
- Designated: 5 August 1998
- Reference no.: 958

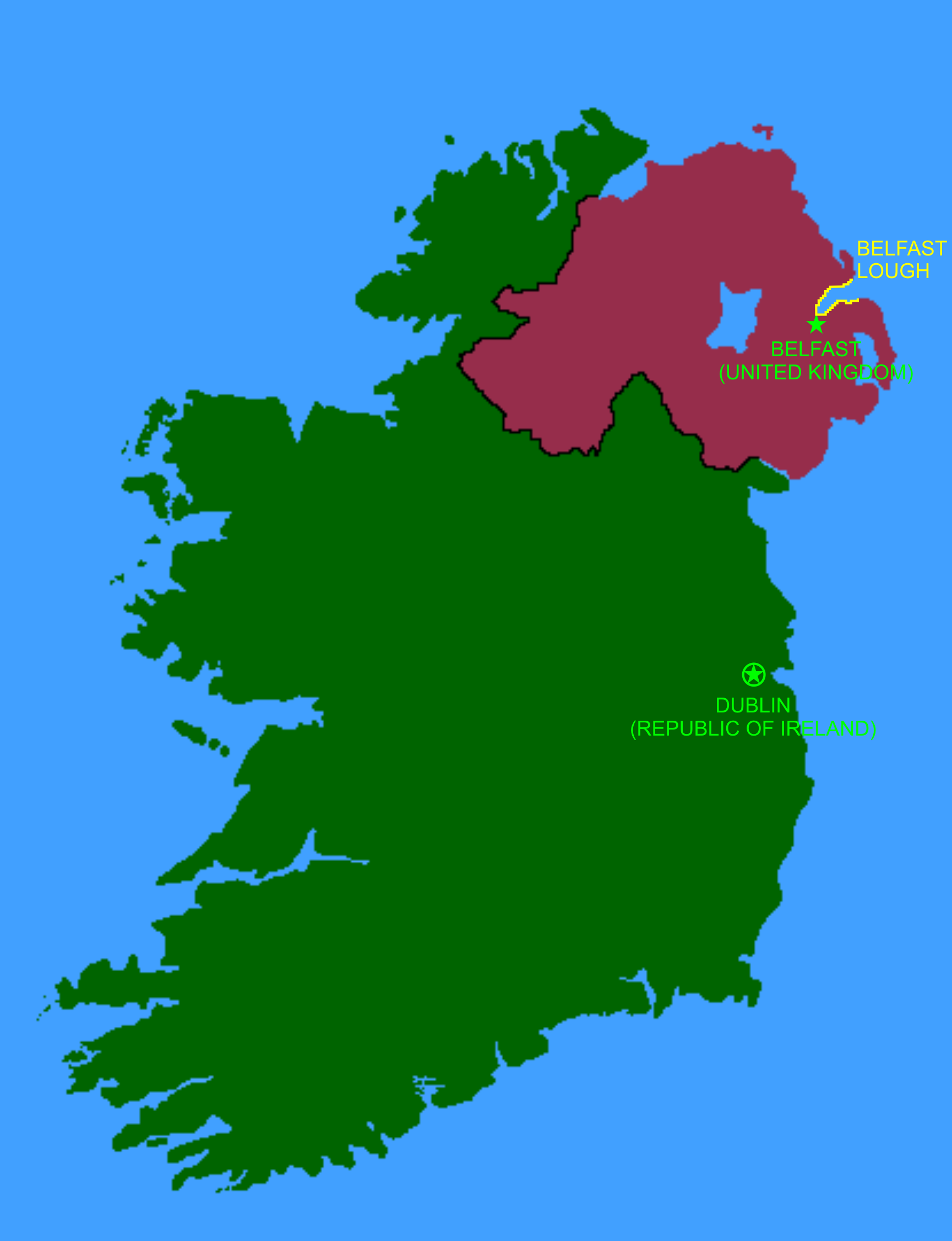
The island of Ireland, with the Republic of Ireland in green, Northern Ireland (UK) in magenta, and Belfast Lough in yellow.

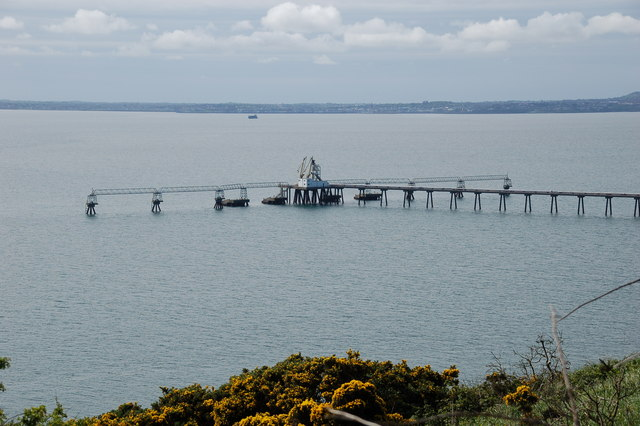
The jetty at Cloghan Point is used to off-load oil from tankers, for use at the nearby Kilroot power station.

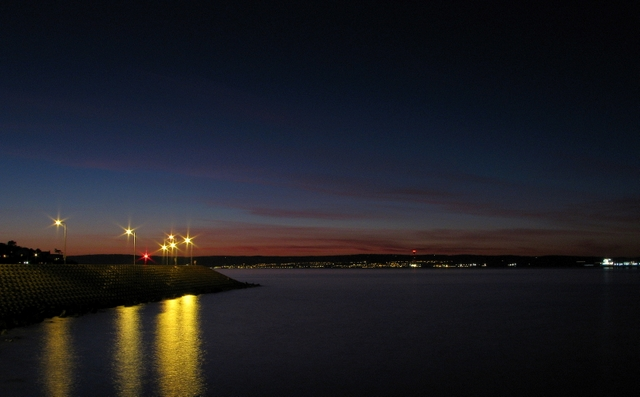
Sunset over Belfast Lough, viewed from Bangor.

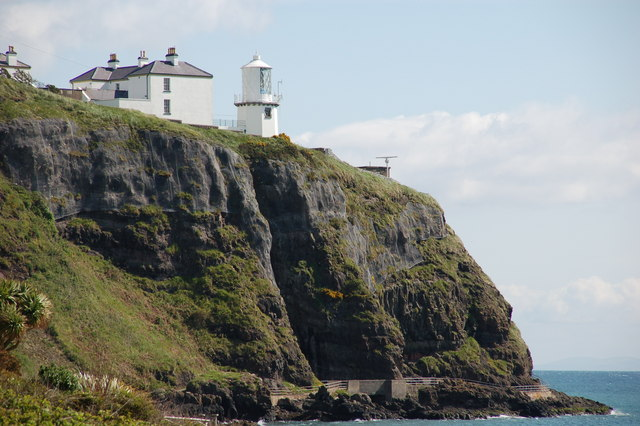
Blackhead Lighthouse is one of three lighthouses in Belfast Lough.

Belfast Lough is a large sea inlet on the east coast of Northern Ireland. At its head is the city and port of Belfast, which sits at the mouth of the River Lagan. The lough opens into the North Channel and connects Belfast to the Irish Sea.

Belfast Lough is a long, wide and deep expanse of water, virtually free of strong tides. The inner part of the lough comprises a series of mudflats and lagoons. The outer lough is restricted to mainly rocky shores with some small sandy bays. The outer boundary of the lough is a line joining Orlock Point and Blackhead.

The main coastal towns are Bangor on the southern shore (County Down) and Carrickfergus on the northern shore (County Antrim). Other coastal settlements include Holywood, Helen's Bay, Greenisland and Whitehead.

== Name ==
Belfast Lough is known in Irish as Loch Lao, which was Anglicised as 'Lough Lee'. Earlier spellings include Loch Laoigh and Loch Laigh. This name means "sea inlet of the calf". The River Lagan, which flows into it, was also historically known as the Lao. It is believed that the lough and river were named after a "bovine goddess". In the 2nd century, the Greek geographer Ptolemy referred to it as the Logia.

Before Belfast grew into a city, the lough was known in English as 'Carrickfergus Bay'. In Ulster-Scots it is called Bilfawst Loch or Craigfergus Loch.

== History ==
In 1689 during the War of the Two Kings the Williamite expeditionary force under Marshal Schomberg landed at Bangor, after the lough had been cleared of French shipping by George Rooke. Schomberg occupied the towns of Bangor and Belfast, before successfully laying siege to Carrickfergus. The following year William III also used the lough as a safe anchorage when he arrived in Ireland with reinforcements for Schomberg in the run-up to the victory over the Jacobite army at the Battle of the Boyne.

== Wildlife ==
=== Nature reserve ===
The "inner lough" was made an Area of Special Scientific Interest (ASSI) in 1987. Recorded wildlife includes Crepidula fornicata Lamarck (Slipper Limpet).

=== Ramsar site ===
The Belfast Lough Ramsar site (wetlands of international importance designated under the Ramsar Convention), is 432.14 hectares in area, at latitude 54 38 00 N and longitude 05 54 00 W. It was designated a Ramsar site on 5 August 1998.

In the outer lough, the Ramsar boundary entirely coincides with that of Outer Belfast Lough Area of Special Scientific Interest but within the immediate harbour area the boundary has been redrawn to take into account permitted port related development and landfill which has taken place since the Inner Belfast Lough Area of Special Scientific Interest was declared in 1987. Marine areas below mean low water are not included. The Ramsar boundary entirely coincides with that of the Belfast Lough Special Protection Area. The site qualifies under Criterion 3c of the Ramsar Convention by regularly supporting internationally important numbers of common redshank in winter. The site also regularly supports nationally important numbers of common shelduck, Eurasian oystercatcher, purple sandpiper, dunlin, black-tailed godwit, bar-tailed godwit, Eurasian curlew and ruddy turnstone. In recent years, Otters have been seen more regularly on the lough shores.

== Sailing ==
Popular for sailing, the lough has three marinas: one at Bangor, one at Carrickfergus and a third located at Titanic Quarter. Belfast docks at the head of a lough contain the famous shipbuilder of the RMS Titanic fame, Harland & Wolff, who are no longer building ships for the foreseeable future and has shed most of its workforce and diversified into repairing and refitting large tankers and oilrigs. Coastguard offices for the lough, although referred to as Belfast Coastguard, are in the town of Bangor by the marina. In 1912, the RMS Titanic sailed down the lough from Belfast to the Irish Sea for its sea trials.

The lough hosts two Royal Yacht Clubs. These include the Royal North of Ireland Yacht Club, at Cultra just outside Holywood, and the Royal Ulster, which is based from Bangor. There are also several other sailing clubs around the lough, many of which are members of the Belfast Lough Yachting Conference.

The lough has 30 square miles (78 km^{2}) of open water and enough coastline to make short inshore races day-long affairs. Three main arteries serve the lough close to Belfast: the Herdman Channel on the County Antrim coast side; the Victoria Channel, the central and longest route; and the Musgrave Channel on the County Down side.

== Railway ==
The Belfast-Larne railway line skirts the north shore particularly from Carrickfergus and then Downshire to Whitehead and northwards then alongside Larne Lough to Larne Harbour. Trains connect Belfast Grand Central and Belfast Lanyon Place to Larne Harbour.

The Belfast-Bangor railway line skirts the south shore at Holywood railway station to Marino railway station and Cultra railway station. Trains connect Belfast Grand Central; and Belfast Lanyon Place to Bangor.

Cultra railway station is the home of the Ulster Folk and Transport Museum.

== See also ==
- List of Irish lochs and loughs
- List of Ramsar sites in Northern Ireland
