= St Nicholas School =

St Nicholas School may refer to:

- Saint Nicholas School, Essex, England
- St. Nicholas Grammar School, Middlesex, England
- Old St Nicholas School, Leipzig, Germany
- Saint Nicholas High School, Bangladesh
- CHIJ Saint Nicholas Girls' School, Ang Mo Kio, Singapore
- St Nicholas School Canterbury

== See also ==
- St Nicholas Catholic High School
- St. Nicholas of Tolentine High School
- St Nicholas' School, Hampshire, England
- St. Nicholas' Primary School (disambiguation)
- St. Nicholas High School (Houston, Texas), closed in 1967
