= Clipperstown railway station =

Railway station in Northern Ireland

Clipperstown

General information
- Location: Carrickfergus; Northern Ireland
- Coordinates: 54°43′3″N 5°48′59″W
- Owner: NI Railways
- Operator: NI Railways
- Line: Larne
- Platforms: 2
- Tracks: 2

Construction
- Structure type: At-grade

Other information
- Station code: CP

Key dates
- 1925: Station opened
- 2008: Station refurbished

Passengers
- 2022/23: 139,764
- 2023/24: ▲167,340
- 2024/25: ▲171,410
- 2025/26: ▼170,718
- NI Railways; Translink; NI railway stations
Route map
(Click to expand)
Location
- Location within Northern Ireland Location within island of Ireland

Clipperstown railway station serves the west of Carrickfergus in County Antrim, Northern Ireland.

Clipperstown station is within walking distance of (and clearly visible from) the larger Carrickfergus station, however road connections between the two are much more complicated. The timetable allows two minutes for the train to travel from Clipperstown to Carrickfergus.

The station was opened on 1 April 1925.

== Service ==
On Mondays to Fridays, there is a half-hourly service to Belfast Grand Central with extra trains at peak times. In the other direction, there is a half-hourly service to Whitehead. Every hour trains operate to Larne Harbour, with extra services to Carrickfergus and Larne Town at peak times.

On Saturdays, the service remains half-hourly, with fewer trains at peak times.

On Sundays, the service reduces to an hourly operation in both directions.

Preceding station	NI Railways	Following station
Trooperslane	Northern Ireland Railways; Belfast-Larne Line	Carrickfergus
	Historical railways	
Mount; Line open, station closed	Northern Counties Committee; Belfast-Larne	Carrickfergus; Line and station open
