= Belfast Lough Yachting Conference =

Belfast Lough Yachting Conference (BLYC) is a group that encompasses the yacht clubs on Belfast Lough and Larne Lough in Northern Ireland. Its primary aim is to look after scheduling the regattas that each club host, to try to prevent clashing events. Member clubs within the conference include:

- Ballyholme Yacht Club (founded 1920)
- Belfast Lough Sailibility (founded 2001)
- Carrickfergus Sailing Club (founded 1866)
- Cockle Island Boat Club (founded 1974)
- County Antrim Yacht Club (founded 1902)
- Donaghadee Sailing Club (founded 1970)
- East Antrim Boat Club (founded 1950)
- Holywood Yacht Club (oldest yacht club on Belfast Lough; founded in 1862 at Holywood, County Down)
- Royal North of Ireland Yacht Club (founded 1899; renamed in 1902)
- Royal Ulster Yacht Club (founded 1866)
