= Gillian Arnold =

Gillian Arnold may refer to:

- Gillian Arnold (artist) (born 1971), Northern Irish botanical artist
- Gillian Arnold (technologist), British IT leader
- Polly Perkins (born Gillian Arnold, 1943), British actress, singer and writer
