= Kilroot railway station =

Former railway station in Northern Ireland

Coordinates: 54.732°N 5.751°W

Kilroot
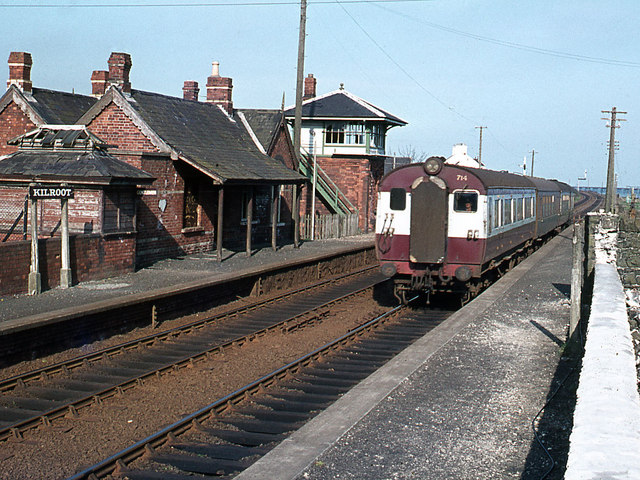
- Kilroot station in 1974.

General information
- Location: Kilroot, Carrickfergus Borough Council; Northern Ireland
- Platforms: 2

Other information
- Status: Disused

History
- Pre-grouping: Ulster Transport Authority

Key dates
- 1 October 1862: Station opened
- 9 May 1977: Station closed
Location

Kilroot was a station located in the village of Kilroot, close to the town of Carrickfergus, in Northern Ireland.

At one time it was the last in a tight cluster of stations, each located almost one minute from the other, from Mount railway station through to the halt at Kilroot.

The station closed in 1977 when Northern Ireland Railways services were cut back. It has now been dismantled, and all traces were lost whenever Kilroot power station was constructed in the late 1970s.

Preceding station	NI Railways	Following station
Eden	Northern Ireland Railways; Belfast-Larne	Whitehead
	Historical railways	
Eden; Line open, station closed	Northern Counties Committee; Belfast-Larne	Whitehead; Line and station open
