= Trooperslane railway station =

Railway station in Northern Ireland

Trooperslane
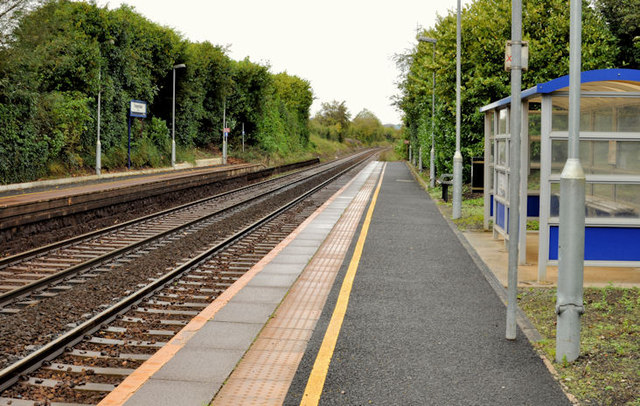
- Trooperslane halt in 2011

General information
- Location: Trooperslane; Northern Ireland
- Coordinates: 54.710059°N 5.849477°W
- Owner: NI Railways
- Operator: NI Railways
- Line: Larne
- Platforms: 2
- Tracks: 2

Construction
- Structure type: At-grade

Other information
- Station code: TE

Key dates
- 1848: Station opened
- 2008: Station refurbished

Passengers
- 2022/23: 50,501
- 2023/24: ▲84,535
- 2024/25: ▲102,816
- 2025/26: ▲119,229
- NI Railways; Translink; NI railway stations
Route map
(Click to expand)
Location
- Location within Northern Ireland Location within island of Ireland

Trooperslane railway station serves the hamlet of Trooperslane in County Antrim, Northern Ireland.

A park and ride facility is located at the station.

The station was opened on 11 April 1848.

For many years it was served only by peak-time services on Mondays to Saturdays. On a trial basis in the 1990s, one service each way made a request stop on a Sunday, however this was not a success.

When Northern Ireland Railways introduced a new clock-face timetable in the mid-2000s, the station once again saw a regular service seven days a week, with nearly all trains serving the station. Trooperslane also has a level crossing, supervised by closed-circuit television.

== Service ==
On Mondays to Fridays, there is a half-hourly service to Belfast Grand Central with extra trains at peak times. In the other direction, there is a half-hourly service with the terminus alternating between Whitehead and Larne Harbour every half an hour, with extra services to Carrickfergus and Larne Town at peak times.

On Saturdays, the service remains half-hourly, with fewer trains at peak times.

On Sundays, the service reduces to hourly operation in both directions.

Preceding station	NI Railways	Following station
Greenisland	Northern Ireland Railways; Belfast–Larne line	Clipperstown
	Historical railways	
Greenisland; Line and station open	Northern Counties Committee; Belfast-Larne	Mount; Line open, station closed
