= Carrickfergus FM =

Carrickfergus; Northern Ireland
- Frequencies: Usually 107.6FM & Internet

Links
- Website: http://www.carrickfergusfm.co.uk

Carrickfergus FM is a Restricted Service Licence community radio station which broadcasts bi-annually in the town of Carrickfergus, Northern Ireland during the Christmas and Summer periods. The station was launched in June 2005, and was set up by a committee of local traders and two commercial radio presenters who had many years experience in running and operating RSL's.

The community station is primarily for the residents of the Borough of Carrickfergus but also broadcasts to a large online audience and combines a mix of professional radio presenters with new talent from the local area. It currently is the longest running short-term radio station in Northern Ireland.

In 2006, Carrickfergus FM received a Certificate at the Carrickfergus Business Awards in the "Best Community Initiative" category and is an active part of the community, providing entertainment at numerous functions, including the "Special Olympics party" at the Castle Green, the Christmas Tree Light Switch On and the Girl Guides Centenary Festival in years gone by as well as throwing an on-air promotion party for Carrick Rangers after they won the Championship in the 2010/2011 season. The team provided exclusive radio coverage of Armed Forces Day 2012 in the town and have professionally recorded and produced a DVD which will go on sale to raise funds for local armed forces charities.

Carrickfergus FM's reputation within the borough is such that it has attracted several celebrity interviews, recently including the likes of former Eurovision winner Niamh Kavanagh , ex-Premier League footballer Michael Hughes , X Factor's Eoghan Quigg and highly acclaimed broadcasters George Jones, Hendi & John Rosborough amongst others.

In recent years the station has become renowned for fun features, perhaps none more so than the annual Bagger of the Year competition which has attracted attention from major multi-national retailers and local corner shops alike.

== Presenters ==
Current Presenters and Team

- Michael Clarke
- Donagh McKeown
- Justin Macartney
- Maurice Taggart
- Sam McFerran
- Patrick Smyth
- Sean Brown
- David Gabbie
- Andrew Hammill
- Caitlyn McCaigue
- Ed Canning
- Aaron Anderson (ando)
- Stewart Harper

Past presenters

- Kenny Tosh
- Phil West
- Bill Smyth
- Colin Kennedy (CK the DJ)
- Mal Reynolds
- Alan Jenkins
- Lorraine Lee
- Sarah-Jayne Cassells
- Andrew Frazier
- Lewis McAdam
- Lauren Mulvenny
- Mark Horner
- Aaron Anderson (ando)
