= Ruffian 23 =

Keelboat designed by Billy Brown

The Ruffian 23 is a 23-foot keelboat designed by Billy Brown in Portaferry in the early 1970s. Over 200 yachts were built during the 1970s and early 1980s by 'Weatherly Yachts', a company established by Billy Brown and his brother 'Dickie', initially in Portaferry, and later in Dublin and then in Baltimore Co. Cork. Fleets exist racing today in Dublin Bay, Carrickfergus, Hong Kong, Clew Bay and Wicklow
