= Carrickfergus Waterfront =

Area of Carrickfergus, Belfast Lough, UK

Coordinates: 54.710°N 5.817°W

Carrickfergus Waterfront is an area of Carrickfergus situated on the north shore of Belfast Lough, which includes two harbour facilities, several restaurants and bars and promenade areas.

The waterfront area is mainly composed of two harbour facilities, a harbour and a marina. Both harbours feature rugged rubble stone breakwaters, designed to absorb energy from heavy swells.

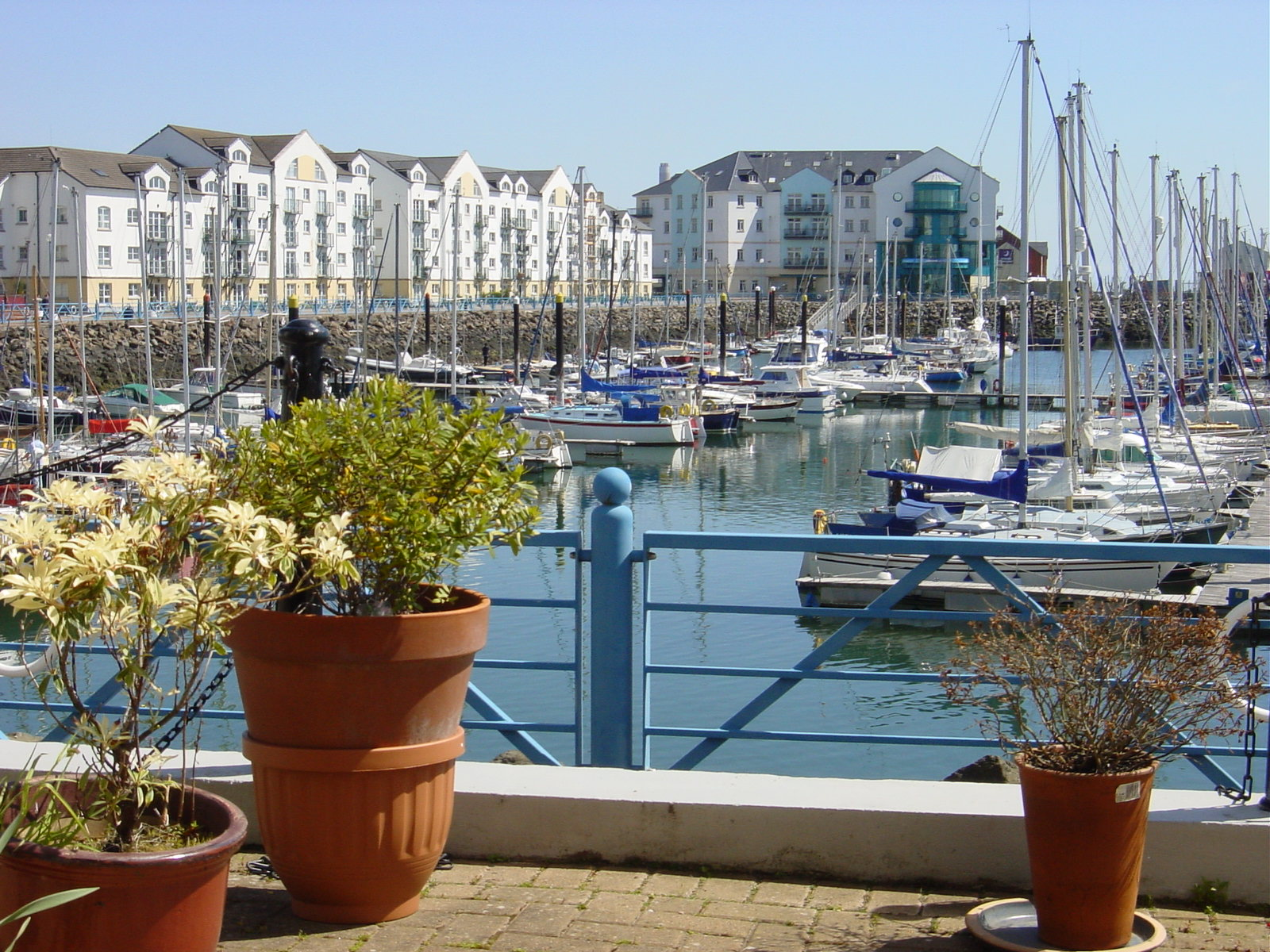
View on the Carrickfergus Marina

== Harbour ==
The harbour is a 12th-century Norman harbour, made during the construction of Carrickfergus Castle, built in 1127. It is split into two sections, the larger section being closer to the mouth of the harbour and the smaller inner section being used primarily for less frequently used boats, and featuring a slipway. The promenade from the castle grounds to the other side of the harbour was refurbished during 2008/2009 along with the promenade along the Marine Highway.

The harbour features a 258-metre quay which is commonly used for walking and for fishing.

== Marina ==
200 metres west of the harbour is Carrickfergus Marina, a purpose-built marina basin opened in 1985.

It has 300 berths and offers individual access to water and electricity. The complex also provides lifting equipment.

The marina is located close to several restaurants, a children's play facility/park, a six-screen cinema, a supermarket, the Carrickfergus Sailing Club and The Windrose - a bar/restaurant overlooking the marina.

During 2004/2005, the "Harbour Point" was built in the area between the harbour and marina. The building has a restaurant as well as a bar/lounge on the ground floor and a nightclub on the floor above. During the same time period, several other establishments were built surrounding the harbour, including a restaurant a Premier Inn.
