= Barn railway station =

Former railway station in Northern Ireland

Coordinates: 54°43′09″N 5°47′59″W

Barn
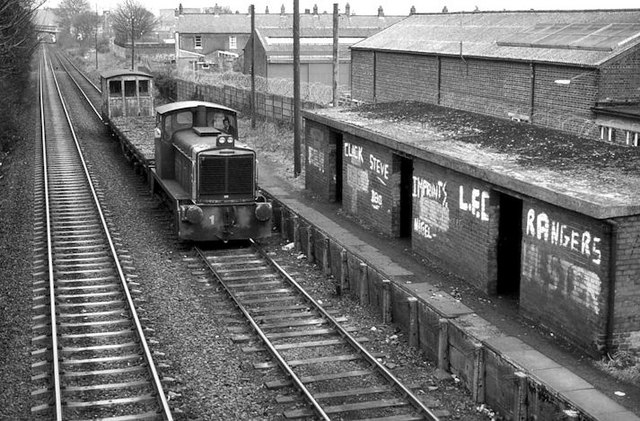
- The remains of Barn halt in 1984

General information
- Location: Taylors Avenue, Carrickfergus, Carrickfergus Borough Council; Northern Ireland
- Platforms: 2

Other information
- Status: Disused

History
- Pre-grouping: Ulster Transport Authority

Key dates
- 1 April 1925: Station opened
- 9 May 1977: Station closed
Location

Barn (also known as Barn Halt) was a station located in the town of Carrickfergus in Northern Ireland. At one time it was part of a tight cluster of stations in the Carrickfergus area, each located one minute from the other.

The station closed in 1977 when Northern Ireland Railways services were cut back. All remnants of the station were cleared away during track re-laying in 1997, however its old footbridge still remains in use as a pedestrian crossing over the railway line..

Preceding station	NI Railways	Following station
Carrickfergus	Northern Ireland Railways; Belfast-Larne	Downshire
	Historical railways	
Carrickfergus; Line and station open	Northern Counties Committee; Belfast-Larne	Downshire; Line and station open
