= St. Nicholas' Primary School =

St. Nicholas' or St. Nicholas Primary School may refer to one of a number of schools:

- St Nicholas Church Of England Primary School, Shepperton, Surrey, England
- St. Nicholas' Primary School, Carrickfergus, County Antrim, Northern Ireland
- St Nicholas Primary School, Kingston-upon-Hull, England
- St. Nicholas' CE Primary School, Alcester, Warwickshire, England
