= Daniel Cambridge =

Irish Victoria Cross recipient (1820-1882)

Daniel Cambridge VC
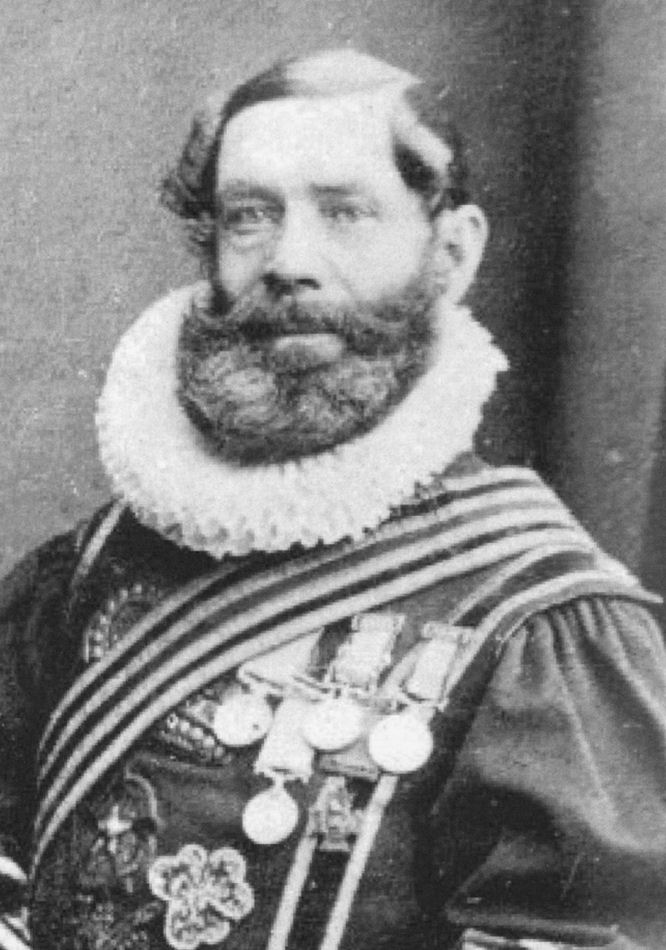
- Yeoman Daniel Cambridge VC
- Born: 27 March 1820; Carrickfergus, County Antrim, Ireland
- Died: 4 June 1882 (aged 62); Plumstead, London, England
- Military career
- Allegiance: United Kingdom
- Branch: British Army
- Service years: 1839–1871
- Rank: Master Gunner
- Units: Royal Artillery
- Conflicts: Crimean War
- Awards: Victoria Cross
- Other work: Yeoman of the Guard

Daniel Cambridge VC (27 March 1820 – 4 June 1882) born in Carrickfergus, County Antrim, Ireland, was an Irish recipient of the Victoria Cross, the highest and most prestigious award for gallantry in the face of the enemy that can be awarded to British and Commonwealth forces.

Cambridge was 35 years old and a Bombardier in the Royal Regiment of Artillery, British Army when he carried out the actions during the Crimean War for which he was awarded the Victoria Cross.

On 8 September 1855 at Sebastopol, Crimea, Cambridge volunteered for the spiking party on the assault on the Redan. He remained with the party after being severely wounded twice, but had refused to leave until the general retirement was ordered, and even then he repeatedly went back into the open to carry wounded men to safety. In the latter part of the day, he sprang forward to bring in another wounded man. While carrying the helpless infantryman to the safety of the trench Daniel was seen to stagger. Subsequently, Daniel was found to have been shot a third time, in his right jaw, and, incapacitated, he took no further part in the action.

== Background ==
Cambridge was born in Carrickfergus, County Antrim, Ireland, on 27 June 1820 to Archibald Cambridge and Bridget, formerly Murray.

Attesting in Lisburn, County Antrim, on 20 June 1839 he gave his occupation as labourer and he is recorded as being 5 feet 8 inches tall with a fresh complexion, dark grey eyes and brown hair. He enlisted four days later as a Driver and Gunner in the 4th Battalion, Royal Regiment of Artillery, on 24 June 1839. He served with the 2nd Company, 4th Battalion, in Malta (1841–1847) and was then posted to Canada with the 7th Battalion in 1848.

On 28 August 1849 he married Ann Bigham, an Irish lass, whose parents were James Bigham and Ann, formerly Young, in Notre-Dame de Québec, Canada East.

On 21 November 1853 Cambridge's posting to Canada came to an end and he and Ann, now expecting their first child, found themselves on the way to England and the Royal Arsenal, Woolwich, the home of the Royal Artillery.

== Crimea ==
In March 1854 Britain and France declared war on Russia, beginning the Crimean War, and Cambridge briefly reverted to the 4th Battalion in Woolwich, Kent, before transferring to the 8th Company, 11th Battalion the following month. In June he embarked with his regiment for the Crimea, passing through Scutari and Varna and disembarked on the Crimean Peninsula with the siege train on 19 September 1854.

On 8 October 1854 the besiegement of Sebastopol by sea and land began and on 17 October Sebastopol was bombarded by 126 British and French guns. Cambridge took part in the defeat of the Russians at Inkerman on 5 November and then returned to Sebastopol.

On 3 April 1855, Gunner and Driver Daniel Cambridge was promoted to Bombardier, according to his record of service preserved in WO 10/2231 at the National Archives, Kew, London.

On 9 April Sebastopol was again bombarded with 501 Allied guns, 101 of them British. Sebastopol was bombarded for the third time on 6 June 1855 and Mamelon and the Quarries were captured by the Allies. The 17 and 18 June saw the fourth bombardment of Sebastopol followed by the first assaults on the Malakov and Redan. The 17 August saw the fifth bombardment of Sebastopol with 600 Allied guns, which lasted for four days.

The sixth and final bombardment, which began on 5 September with 775 Allied guns, lasted for three days. On 8 September Cambridge accepted Capt. Davis' invitation to join the spiking party for the British assault on the Redan. The French assaulted the Malakov, which they took by surprise without loss, the Russians being at dinner. But the British were cut down by the Russian's murderous fire from the Redan into the Quarries. As the Artillerymen's spiking party were unable to spike the Russian guns the Gunners helped and carried as many of the wounded infantrymen to safety as they could. The despatches relating to the incident record him as being severely wounded.

Explosions were heard during the night and a small party advanced to find the Redan deserted. On the following day, 9 September 1855, the Russian army retired by a bridge of boats to the north to evacuate the south side of Sebastopol and their navy sank all their ships of war in the harbour, which signalled Russia's capitulation.

On 29 January 1856, in a final futile act, Russian guns bombarded Sebastopol and on 1 February Russia accepted preliminary peace terms in Vienna. On 25 February the Congress of Paris convened to begin peace negotiations and the Armistice was signed on 29 February.

Cambridge returned with his regiment to Woolwich in March and on 30 March final peace was agreed, the Treaty of Paris was signed and the Congress of Paris was concluded.

On 21 April 1856 Cambridge was promoted Serjeant with 7th Company, 11th Battalion.

A copy of the original hand-written citation sent to the Adjutant-General of the Forces on 19 December 1856 can be found in a manuscript book (MS C1,171E.) in the Library of the Royal Artillery and states:

Serjeant Daniel Cambridge No. 8 Co 11th Battn recommended by Lt Col Strange CB

Served as a volunteer at the assault on the Redan

8 Sept – Early in the day he was wounded in the leg but did not on that account leave the Assaulting Party though recommended to do so – At a subsequent part of the day he went out in front of the advanced trench in the Quarries under a heavy fire in order to bring in a wounded man, in performing which service he was severely wounded a 2nd time, having been shot through the jaw.

Where performed – Assault of Redan 8 Sept 55

By whom vouched: Lt Col Strange, Capt. G Davis

Lieutenant Colonel H. F. Strange CB commanded his company, and Captain Gronow Davis commanded the spiking party. Capt. Gronow Davis also received the Victoria Cross for his actions at the Redan on 8 September 1855.

In April 1857 Cambridge was promoted to quarter master serjeant.

The London Gazette of 23 June 1857 announced the award of the Victoria Cross to Serjeant Daniel Cambridge, and gave the citation as follows:

For having volunteered for the spiking party at the assault on the Redan, 8 September 1855, and continuing therewith, after being severely wounded; and for having, in the after part of the same day, gone out in front of the advanced trench, under a heavy fire, to bring in a wounded man, in performing which service, he was himself severely wounded a second time.

Shortly after Cambridge also received the Al Valore Militare, the Sardinian Military Medal of Valour, for which the citation read:

Served in the trenches throughout the whole of the siege of Sebastopol. Formed one of the spiking party on the 8th September, 1855, on which occasion he was severely wounded. Was noted for his cool and intrepid conduct under fire. This non-commissioned officer has received the Victoria Cross.

Cambridge was the twenty-second of the original sixty two medal recipients who received the Cross from Queen Victoria at the first VC Investiture in Hyde Park on 26 June 1857.

== Later life ==
Later in 1857 Daniel was promoted to Master Gunner with the 8th Coastal Battery, Athlone, County Roscommon, Ireland. On 21 February 1862 Daniel was posted to Fort Tarbert, County Kerry, Ireland.

In 1861 Cambridge received the Long Service and Good Conduct Medal for 22 years of military service.

On 12 July 1865 Daniel wrote to JA Brown, author of "England's Artillerymen", from Fort Tarbert, County Kerry:

... I was three times wounded on 8th September. However, it is very little difference now although I suffer from my wounds and still will from what doctors say until my last. I was twice wounded when asked to retire to the rear but that I did by all means declined to do although hard pressed to do so by several officers. But finding I had the strength to stand another chance I advanced a third time with the 3rd Buffs when I received a gunshot wound in my right jaw and by the assistance of several doctors I have at present got 185 bits of bone out of my jaw. And I can assure you that I suffer very much from my head. I may say all over.

Cambridge was pensioned as a Master Gunner after completing thirty-two years' service on 27 June 1871. In that same year Cambridge was appointed to the sovereign's bodyguard the Yeomen of the Guard.

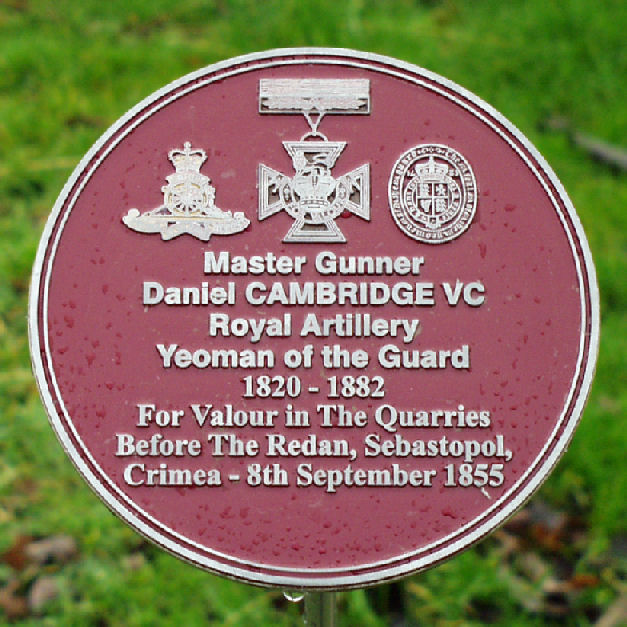

The other medals he wore with his Victoria Cross are the British Crimean War medal (with clasps Inkerman and Sebastopol). Long Service and Good Conduct Medal, Sardinian Al Valore Militare and Turkish Crimean War medal (Sardinian Issue).

Cambridge died from the wounds received in the Crimean War on 4 June 1882 at 57 Frederick Place, Plumstead, aged 62 years, and was survived by his wife, Ann, formerly Bigham, and their children William (born in Woolwich in 1854), Mary (Athlone 1857), Agnes (Athlone 1859), Daniel (Athlone 1861), Catherine (Tarbert 1865) and Elizabeth (Tarbert 1865).

== Medal ==
His Victoria Cross is displayed at the Royal Artillery Museum, in Woolwich, London.

== Medal entitlement ==
- Victoria Cross
- Crimea Medal with clasps Inkerman and Sebastopol
- Long Service and Good Conduct Medal
- Sardinian Al Valore Militare
- Turkish Crimea Medal (Sardinian Issue)
