= Carrickfergus Town Hall =

Municipal Building in Carrickfergus, Northern Ireland

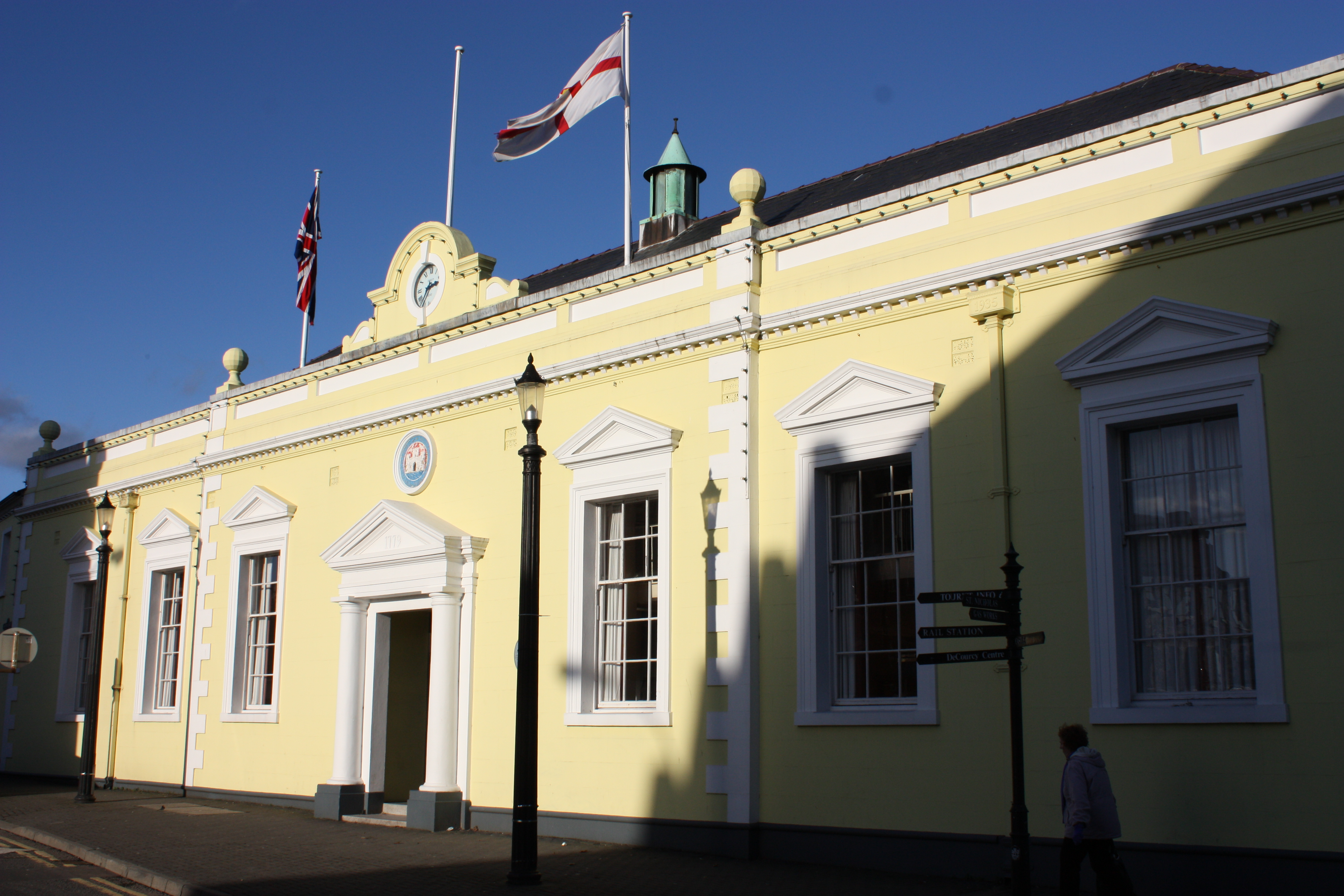
- Carrickfergus Town Hall

- Shown in Northern Ireland
- 54.7157°N 5.8053°W
- Location: Joymount, Carrickfergus

History
- Built: 1779

Site notes
- Architect: Richard Drew
- Architectural style: Georgian style

Listed Building – Grade B+
- Official name: Carrickfergus Borough Council Town Hall, Joymount, Carrickfergus, County Antrim
- Designated: 25 February 1976
- Reference no.: HB 22/08/008

Carrickfergus Town Hall is a municipal structure in Joymount in Carrickfergus, County Antrim, Northern Ireland. The town hall, which was the headquarters of Carrickfergus Borough Council, is a Grade B+ listed building.

== History ==
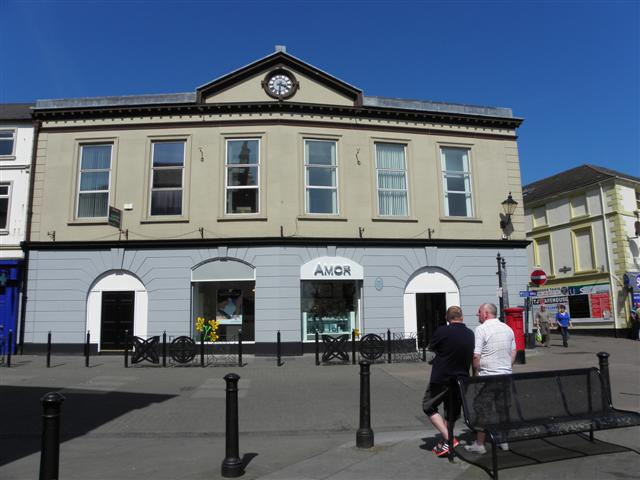
The former market house in Carrrickfergus, which served as the local council offices until 1935

The site selected for the town hall had previously been occupied by a Franciscan friary, which was established in 1248 but disestablished during the Dissolution of the Monasteries in the 1540s. The site was then occupied by a manor house known as Joymount, which was commissioned by the then Lord Deputy of Ireland, Lord Chichester, in 1618. In the 1760s, the Grand Jury of County Antrim, who were based at Castle Worraigh, an ageing stone tower in the middle of the High Street, decided to procure a new courthouse for the county and the old manor house was demolished in 1768 to make way for the new building.

The new building was designed by Richard Drew in the Georgian style, built in brick with white stucco and was completed in 1779. The design involved a symmetrical main frontage with seven bays facing onto the street; the central section of three bays, which slightly projected forward, featured a doorway flanked by Doric order columns supporting an entablature and a pediment with the date of completion in the tympanum. The other bays contained aediculed sash windows and, at roof level, there was a modillioned cornice and, in the middle, a shaped gable containing a clock.

The building served as the venue for some important judicial hearings including the trial of United Irishman, William Orr, for a breach of the Insurrection Act on 14 October 1797; despite extensive evidence of his innocence, he was found guilty and hanged.

The courthouse was extended in 1819: the structure to the north which was accessed through an entrance known as the Hanging Gate was used as a prison. Executions took place at the Hanging Gate: the last person to be hanged there was a soldier, Private John Cordery of the 66th Regiment of Foot, who, at a trial in the courthouse in 1844, was found guilty of murdering a sergeant, who had apparently been bullying him. In the late 19th century the prison was converted for use as a militia barracks.

The borough council, which had previously met in the market house in the Market Place, acquired the courthouse and converted it for use as its town hall in 1935: the interior of the building was remodelled in an Art Deco style at that time. The building continued to serve as the meeting place of the enlarged Carrickfergus Borough Council after it was formed in 1973. During the flag protests in December 2012, angry loyalist protesters disrupted a meeting of the council and threatened councillors. The building ceased to be the local seat of government following the formation of the enlarged Mid and East Antrim Borough Council at Ballymena in April 2015. The exterior of the building was comprehensively redecorated to a scheme designed by Consarc Architects in 2020.

== See also ==
- List of Grade B+ listed buildings in County Antrim
