= Eden railway station =

Former railway station in Northern Ireland

Coordinates: 54.728°N 5.763°W

Eden

General information
- Location: Eden, Carrickfergus, Carrickfergus Borough Council; Northern Ireland
- Platforms: 2

Other information
- Status: Disused

History
- Pre-grouping: Ulster Transport Authority

Key dates
- 1 April 1925: Station opened
- 9 May 1977: Station closed
Location

Eden (also known as Eden Halt) was a station located in the townland of Eden, in and around the town of Carrickfergus in Northern Ireland. At one time it formed part of a tight cluster of stations, each located almost one minute from the other, from Mount through to Kilroot.

The station closed in 1977 when Northern Ireland Railways rationalised their services. It has now been dismantled.

Eden Halt is the title of a book by Ross Skelton.

Preceding station	NI Railways	Following station
Downshire	Northern Ireland Railways; Belfast-Larne	Kilroot
	Historical railways	
Downshire; Line and station open	Northern Counties Committee; Belfast-Larne	Kilroot; Line open, station closed
