= St Nicholas' Primary School, Carrickfergus =

School in County Antrim, Northern Ireland

Coordinates: 54.714°N 5.815°W

St. Nicholas' Primary School is a Catholic Maintained primary school located in Carrickfergus, County Antrim, Northern Ireland.

== History ==
The school origins date back to Mount Saint Nicholas National School, an inter-denominational national school, which opened in 1871, formerly located in the current school/chapel car park. In 1910, St. Nicholas' Boys and St. Nicholas' Girls Primary Schools, replaced the national school, whose building was subsequently used by Mount St. Nicholas playgroup until the 1990s.

In 1959 the school building was refurbished, helping to accommodate the growing Catholic population in the town. This population growth is largely attributed to the industrialisation of the town in the mid 20th century, with the town becoming a hub for the textiles industries, which attracted employees from Belfast and further afield, to settle in the town. This population growth resulted in the formation of St. Nicholas' High School in Carrickfergus, which opened its doors in September 1969.

In September 1992, the school amalgamated to form St. Nicholas' Primary School. This accommodated both boys and girls, in the same class, for the first time in the primary school's history. This date also coincided with the closure of the St. Colman's Catholic Primary School, Greenisland, resulting in an immediate influx of pupils from this area to St. Nicholas' P.S.

Work began on building a new school in the former playground of the old St. Nicholas' P.S., which was completed and opened by September 1996, and officially opened and blessed by Patrick Walsh (Bishop) in March 1998. The new school has eight classrooms, one of which is used as a playroom for younger children, and a multi purpose gymnasium in which P.E., assembly and after-school clubs occur.

In the 1990s, the school numbers have declined rapidly, with an enrolment of circa 100 pupils but since then has started to grow again with the arrival of Lithuanian and Polish families in the town.

== Initiatives ==
The school is involved in various initiatives including Shared Education and the Comenius programme. It has partner schools not only in Carrickfergus and Northern Ireland but also internationally in Spain and Germany. It is also a host school for the British Council.

== Awards ==
The school has received a range of awards including the Green Flag through the Eco-Schools Programme, the Rights-Respecting School Foundation Award and the Sustrans Bronze School Mark.

In 2022, the school was ranked first out of twenty primary schools in the Carrickfergus area by the School Guide star rating.
