= Royal Ulster Yacht Club =

Yacht club in Northern Ireland

- Burgee

- Ensign
- Short name: RUYC
- Founded: 1866
- Location: Bangor, County Down, Northern Ireland
- Website: http://www.ruyc.co.uk

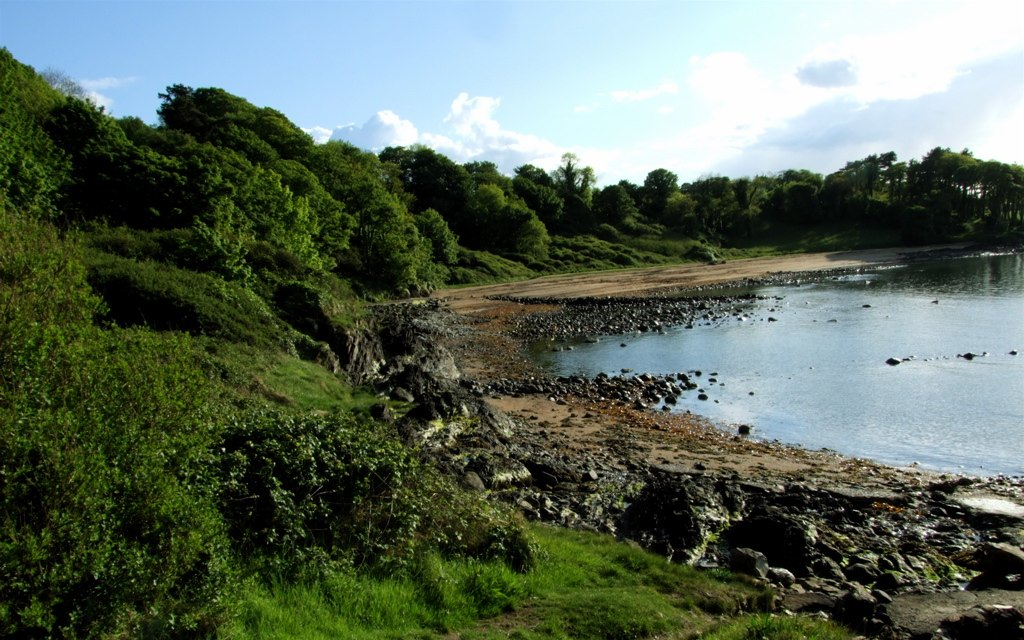
Bangor's coastline.

The Royal Ulster Yacht Club is located in Bangor, County Down, Northern Ireland, on the south shore of Belfast Lough.

== History ==
The club was established in 1866 as the Ulster Yacht Club, on the impetus of Frederick Hamilton-Temple-Blackwood, 1st Marquess of Dufferin and Ava. In 1869 it received a royal warrant. The land for the clubhouse was purchased in 1897 and built by architect Vincent Craig (brother of the 1st Lord Craigavon).

The boating grocer, Sir Thomas Lipton, being blackballed from the Royal Yacht Squadron, launched his America's Cup bid from the RUYC in 1898. Lipton continued to sail from the Royal Ulster until 1929; his legacy being the Lipton Room.

RUYC was visited by the Queen and the Duke of Edinburgh in 1961, with the Duke competing in the regatta. The Duke returned to the club in 2006.

Until 2022, the club's patron was Queen Elizabeth II (a position she held since 1953) and the commodore is Prince Richard, Duke of Gloucester. In late 2023, a new patron had not yet been appointed.

The club is part of the Belfast Lough Yachting Conference.
