= Carrickfergus =

Town in County Antrim, Northern Ireland

Coordinates: 54°42′49″N 05°48′27″W

Carrickfergus: Irish: Carraig Fhearghais; Scots: Carrick or Craigfergus
- Town
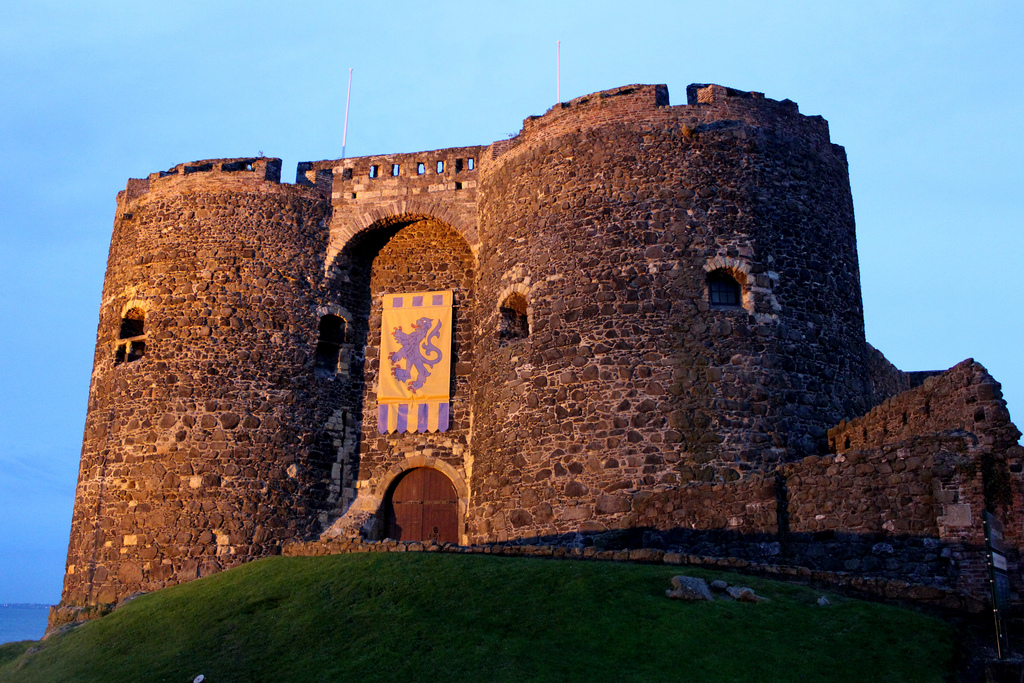
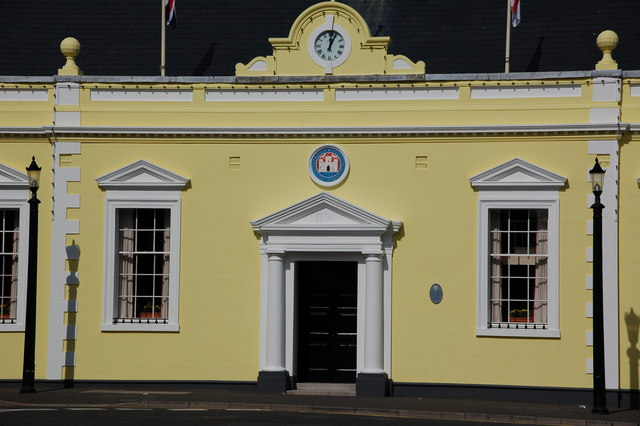
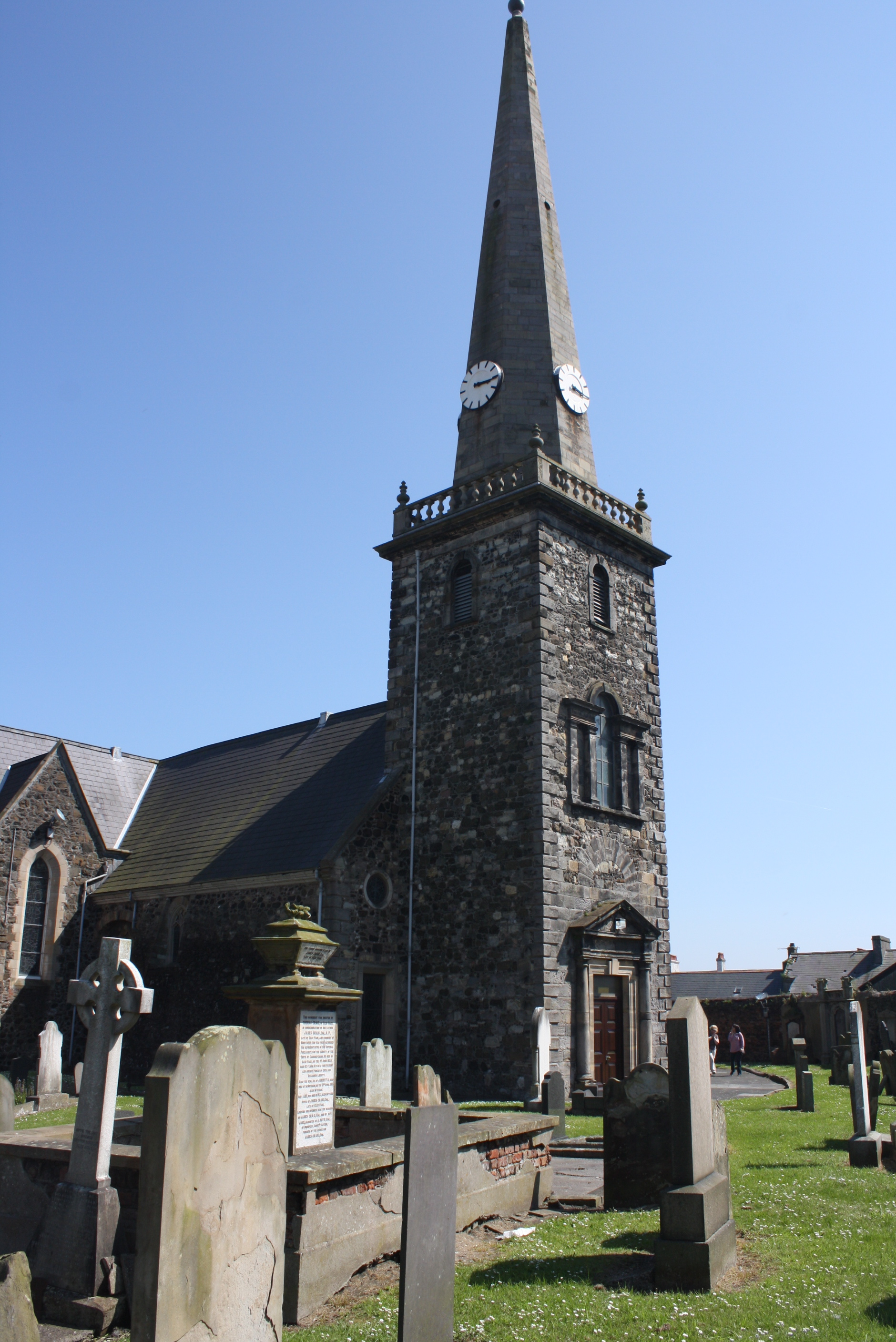
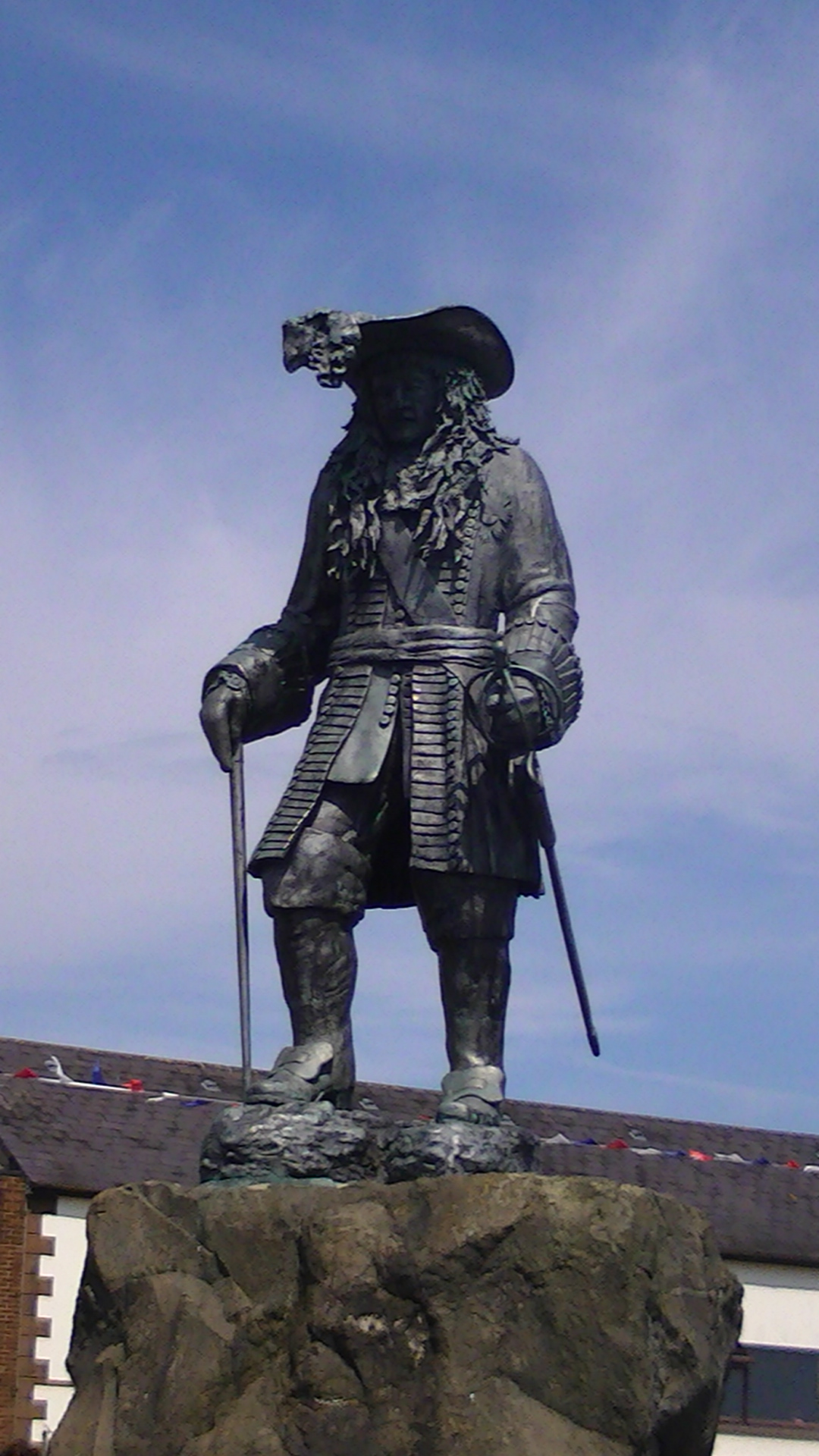
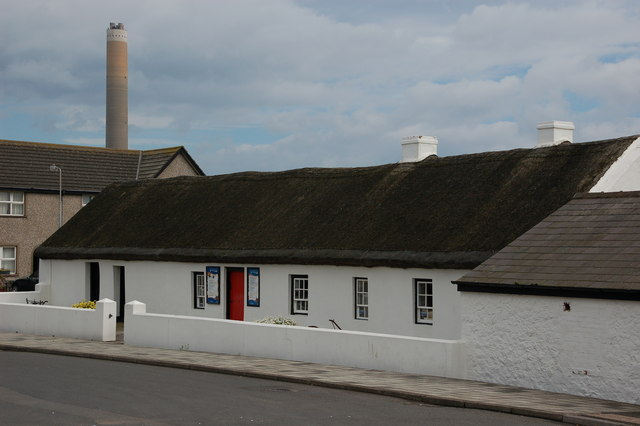
- Top: Carrickfergus Castle, Middle: Carrickfergus Town Hall, St Nicholas' Church, Bottom: William III statue, Andrew Jackson cottage

- Location within Northern Ireland
- Population: 28,141 (2021 census)
  - Belfast: 11 miles (18 km)
- District: Mid and East Antrim
- County: County Antrim
- Country: Northern Ireland
- Sovereign state: United Kingdom
- Post town: CARRICKFERGUS
- Postcode district: BT38
- Dialling code: 028 93
- Police: Northern Ireland
- Fire: Northern Ireland
- Ambulance: Northern Ireland
- UK Parliament: East Antrim
- NI Assembly: East Antrim

Carrickfergus (from Irish Carraig Fhearghais [ˌkaɾˠəc ˈaɾˠəgəʃ, ˌkaɾˠəɟ ˈaɾˠiːʃ], meaning "Fergus' rock") is a historic coastal town in County Antrim, Northern Ireland. It sits on the north shore of Belfast Lough, 11 miles (18 km) from Belfast. The town had a population of 28,141 at the 2021 census. It is County Antrim's oldest town and one of the oldest towns in Ireland as a whole.

Carrickfergus Castle, built in the late 12th century at the behest of Anglo-Norman knight John de Courcy, was the capital of the Earldom of Ulster. After the earldom's collapse, it remained the only English outpost in Ulster for the next four centuries. Carrickfergus was the administrative centre for Carrickfergus Borough Council, before this was amalgamated into the Mid and East Antrim Borough Council in 2015, and forms part of the Belfast Metropolitan Area. It is also a townland of 65 acres, a civil parish and a barony.

== History ==
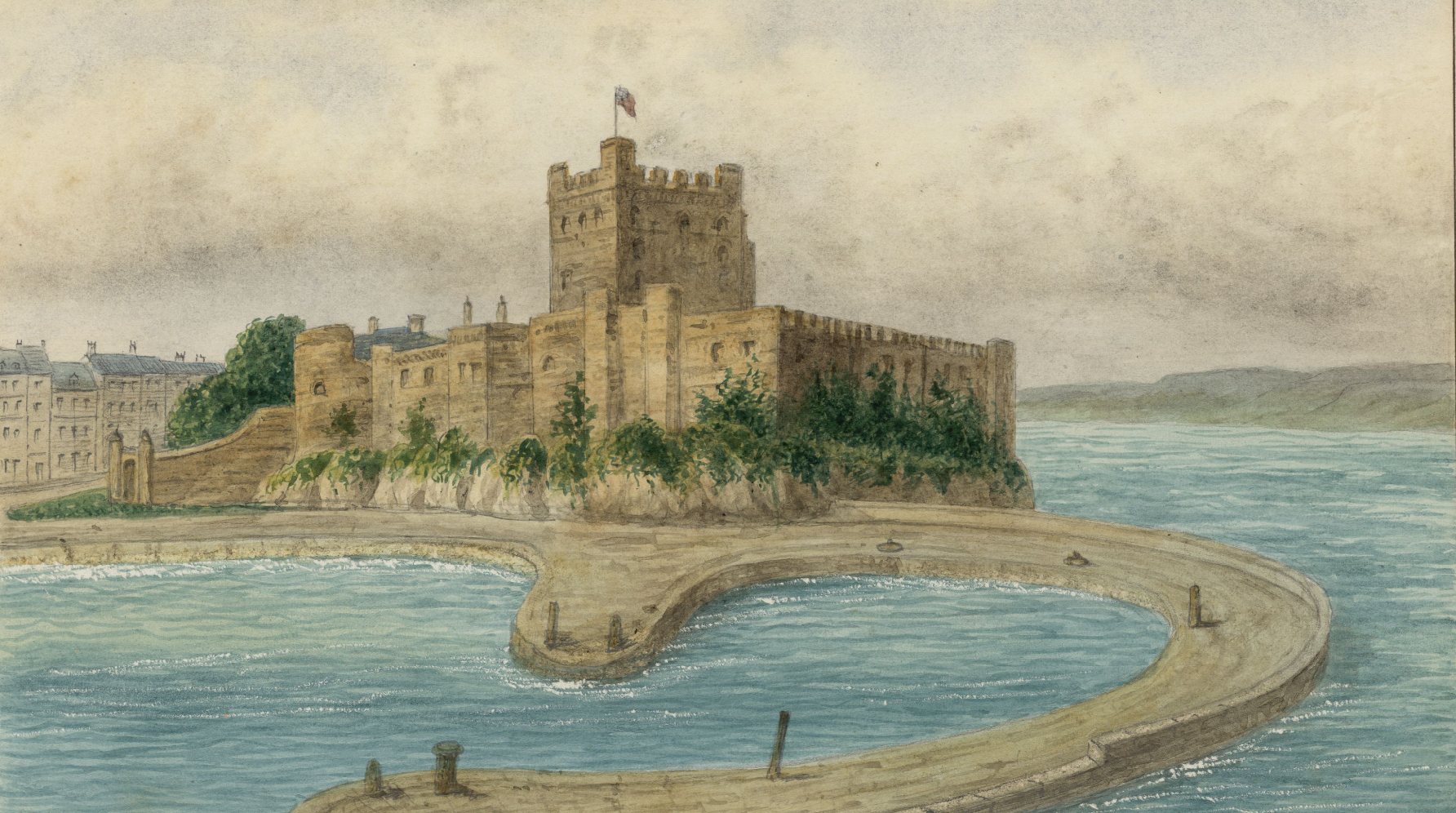
Castle and dock of Carrickfergus in 1830

=== Middle Ages ===
The town is said to take its name from Fergus Mór (Fergus the Great), the legendary king of Dál Riata. According to one tale, his ship ran aground on a rock by the shore, which became known as "Carraig Fhearghais" – the rock of Fergus.

As an urban settlement, Carrickfergus far pre-dates the capital city Belfast and was for a lengthy period both larger and more prominent than the nearby city. Belfast Lough itself was known as Carrickfergus Bay well into the 17th century. The historical walled town originally occupied an area of around 97,000 square metres, which now comprises the town centre, bordered by Albert Road to the west, the Marine Highway to the south, Shaftesbury Park to the north and Joymount Presbyterian Church grounds to the east. Segments of the town wall are still visible in various parts of the town and in various states of preservation. Archaeological excavations close to the walls' foundations have yielded many artefacts that have helped historians piece together a picture of the lives of the 12th and 13th century inhabitants.

Carrickfergus became an inhabited town shortly after 1170, when Anglo-Norman knight John de Courcy invaded Ulster, established his headquarters in the area and built Carrickfergus Castle on the "rock of Fergus" in 1177. The castle, which is the most prominent landmark of Carrickfergus, is widely known as one of the best-preserved Norman castles in Ireland.

Sometime between 1203 and 1205, De Courcy was expelled from Ulster by Hugh de Lacy, as authorised by King John. De Lacy oversaw the final construction of the castle, which included the gatehouse, drum towers and outer ward. It was at this time that he established the nearby St Nicholas' Church. De Lacy was relieved of his command of the town in 1210, when King John himself arrived and placed the castle under royal authority. De Lacy eventually regained his title of Earl of Ulster in 1227, however the castle and its walled town were captured several more times following his death (in 1242). The forces of Edward de Bruce captured the town in 1315 and the castle in 1316 before his death in battle in 1318. The town was largely destroyed by the Scots in 1402.

=== Early modern era ===
The Battle of Carrickfergus, part of the Nine Years War, took place in and around the town in November 1597. It was fought between the crown forces of Queen Elizabeth I and the Scots clan of MacDonnell, and resulted in a defeat for the English. A contemporary Elizabethan illustration of Carrickfergus shows ten tower-houses, as well as terraces of single-storey houses, some detached cottages and 70 or more Irish beehive-type huts in the town.

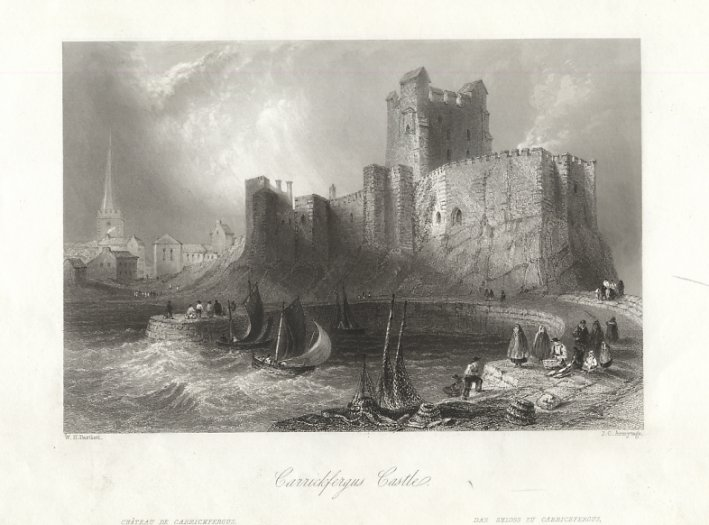
A drawing of Carrickfergus Castle circa 1840.

Sir Arthur Chichester was appointed by the Earl of Essex to govern the castle and town in 1599 and was responsible for the plantation of English and Scottish peoples in the town, as well as the building of the town wall.

In 1642, during the Irish Confederate Wars the Presbytery of Carrickfergus, the first in Ireland, was set up by chaplains with the Covenanter Army in Ireland.

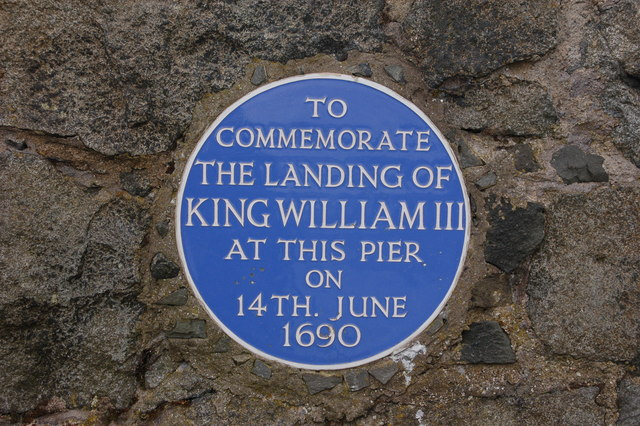
A plaque at the harbour commemorates the landing of William of Orange in the town in 1690.

Nevertheless, the decaying castle withstood several days of siege by the forces of William of Orange in 1689, before surrendering on 28 August. William himself subsequently landed at Carrickfergus on 14 June 1690.

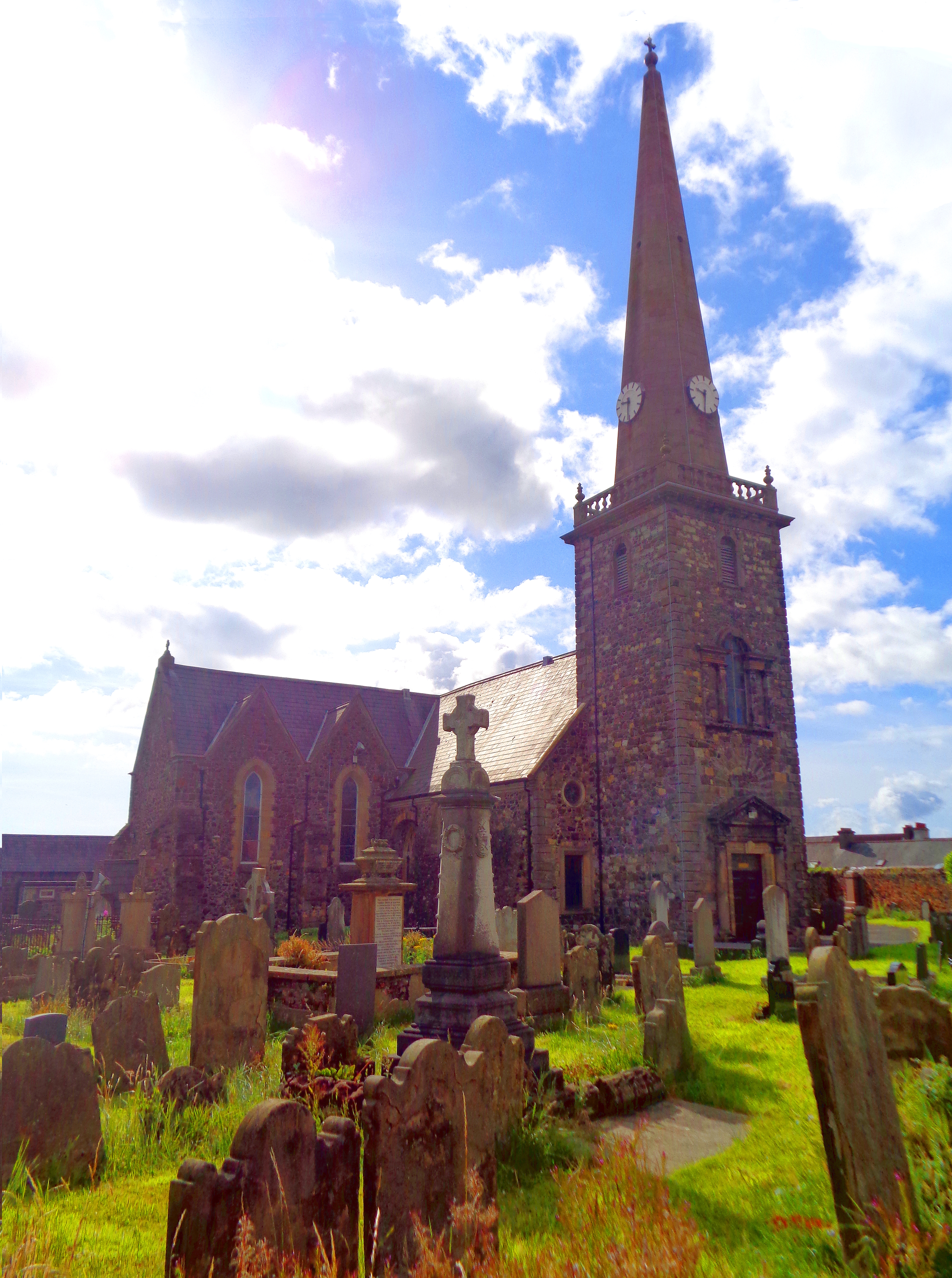
St Nicholas' Church in the town of Carrickfergus

During the Seven Years' War, in February 1760, the whole town was briefly captured and held to ransom by French troops landed from Francois Thurot's naval squadron, after the defenders ran out of ammunition. In 1711 Carrickfergus was the scene of the last witchcraft trial in Ireland. Eight women were charged with bewitching a young girl, and were convicted, despite a strong indication from one of the judges that the jury should acquit. They were sentenced to a year in prison and four sessions in the pillory.

In April 1778, during the American War of Independence, John Paul Jones, in command of the American ship Ranger, attempted to capture a British Royal Navy sloop of war, HMS Drake, moored at Carrickfergus. Having failed, he returned a few days later and challenged Drake to a fight out in the North Channel which the Americans won decisively.

During the 1790s there was considerable support in the Carrickfergus area for the United Irishmen. On 14 October 1797 William Orr was hanged in the town following what was widely regarded as a show trial held in Carrickfergus Courthouse (now the Town Hall) and in 1798 United Irish founder Henry Joy McCracken was captured on the outskirts of the town while trying to escape to America.

=== Modern era ===
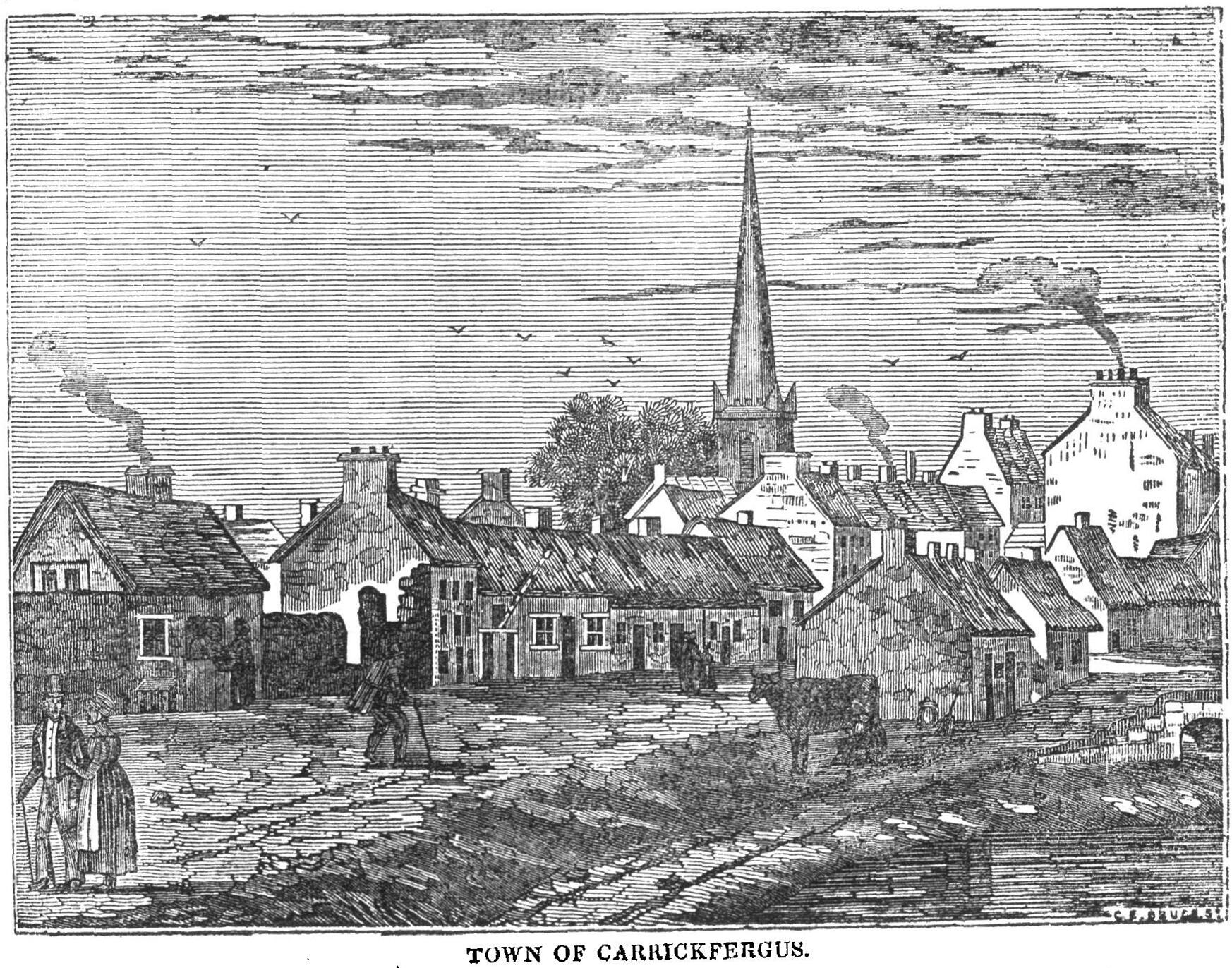
Town of Carrickfergus, 1835, Dublin Penny Journal

In 1912 the people of Carrickfergus turned out in their thousands to watch as the RMS Titanic made its first ever journey up the lough from its construction dock in Belfast. The famous passenger liner was anchored overnight just off the coast of Carrickfergus, before continuing on its journey.

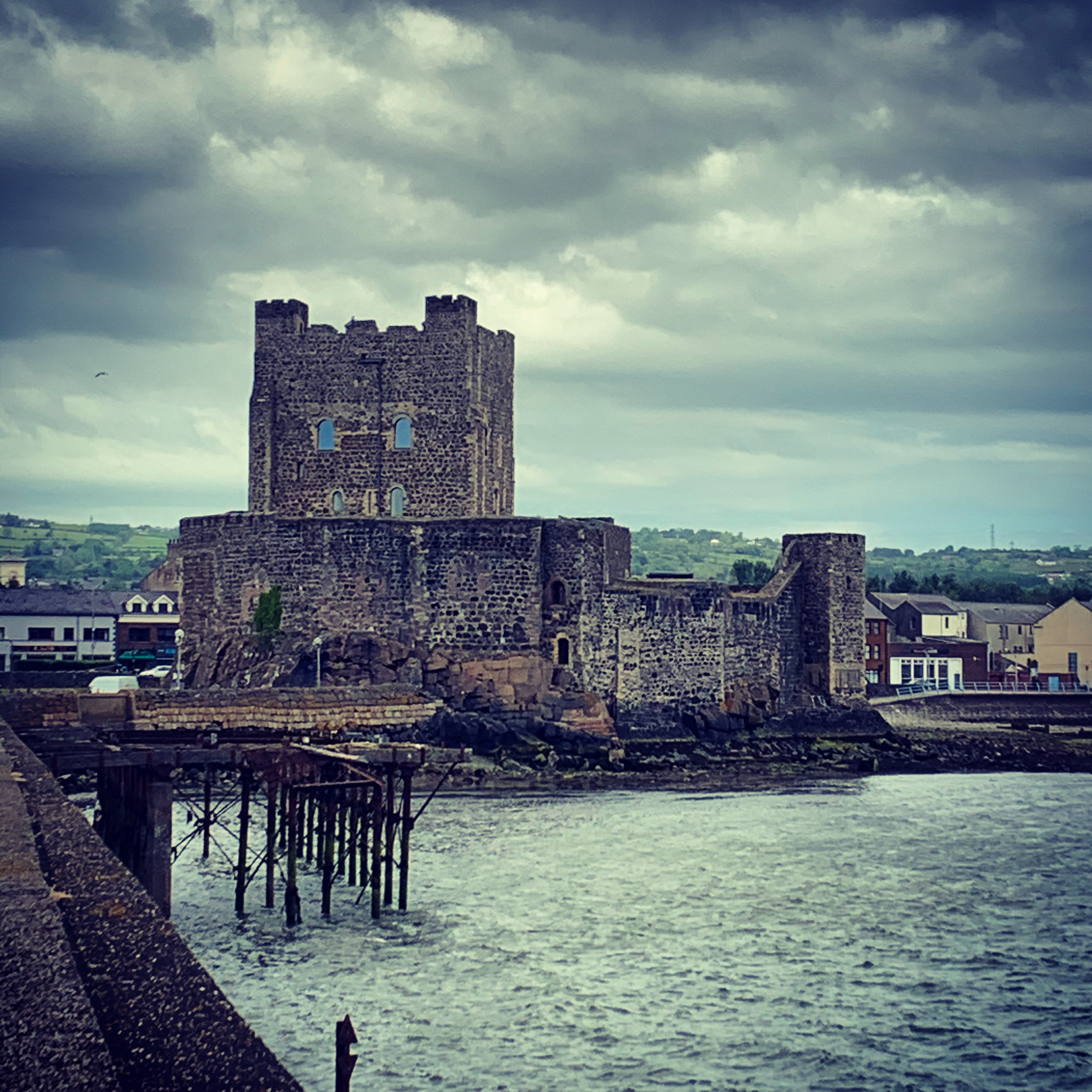
View of Carrickfergus Castle from the dock, June 2020.

During World War II, Northern Ireland was an important military base for United States Naval and Air Operations and a training ground for American G.I.s. The First Battalions of the elite US Rangers were activated and based in Sunnylands Camp for their initial training. The US Rangers Centre in nearby Boneybefore pays homage to this period in history. It is rumoured that Italian and German POWs were held in the town, the Italians in a camp at Sullatober mill, and Germans at Sunnylands.

In the 1970s, the town became an important centre for the textile industry. An ICI man-made fibres factory was opened at Kilroot and was followed by the Rothman's cigarette factory. Courtaulds operated a large rayon works there until the 1980s.

In 1981, Kilroot power station opened and is the largest power station in Northern Ireland.

On 8 September 2007, Carrickfergus was the Northern Irish host for the Last Night at the Proms, featuring Alison Balsom, Alfie Boe, and Ulster conductor Kenneth Montgomery.

The British peerage title of Baron Carrickfergus, which had become extinct in 1883, was bestowed upon Prince William on his wedding day in 2011. He visited the town with Catherine, Princess of Wales in October 2022.

==== The Troubles ====
Throughout the course of The Troubles, there was a paramilitary presence in the town, namely the Ulster Volunteer Force and Ulster Defence Association. Census figures show that the Catholic population of Carrickfergus declined from 16.2% in 1971 to 9.56% in 2011.

== Carrickfergus in song and poetry ==
The town is the subject of the classic Irish folk song "Carrickfergus", a 19th-century translation of an Irish-language song (Do Bhí Bean Uasal) from Munster, which begins with the words, "I wish I was in Carrickfergus".

Scottish Gaelic poet Alasdair mac Mhaighstir Alasdair's immram poem Birlinn Chloinne Raghnaill ("The Birlinn of Clanranald"), describes the sea voyage of a Highland war galley from Loch Eynort, in South Uist, to Carrickfergus. Alan Riach, who has translated the poem into English, has praised the genius of its 18th-century author and how brilliantly he emulated both Homer and Virgil in telling his tale of men against the sea. Riach has also alleged that, in addition to being an immortal work of Scottish Gaelic literature, The Birlinn of Clanranald, is, "one of the great poems of world literature."

== Demography ==
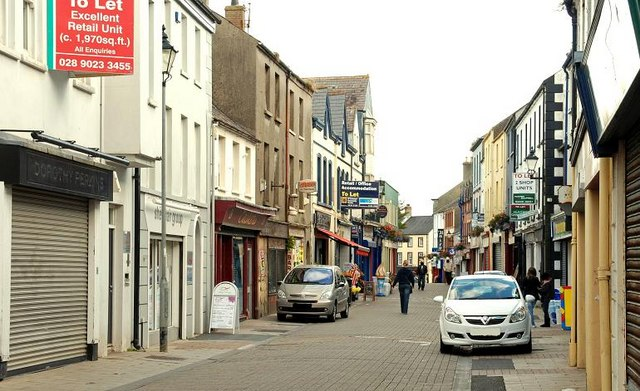
West Street

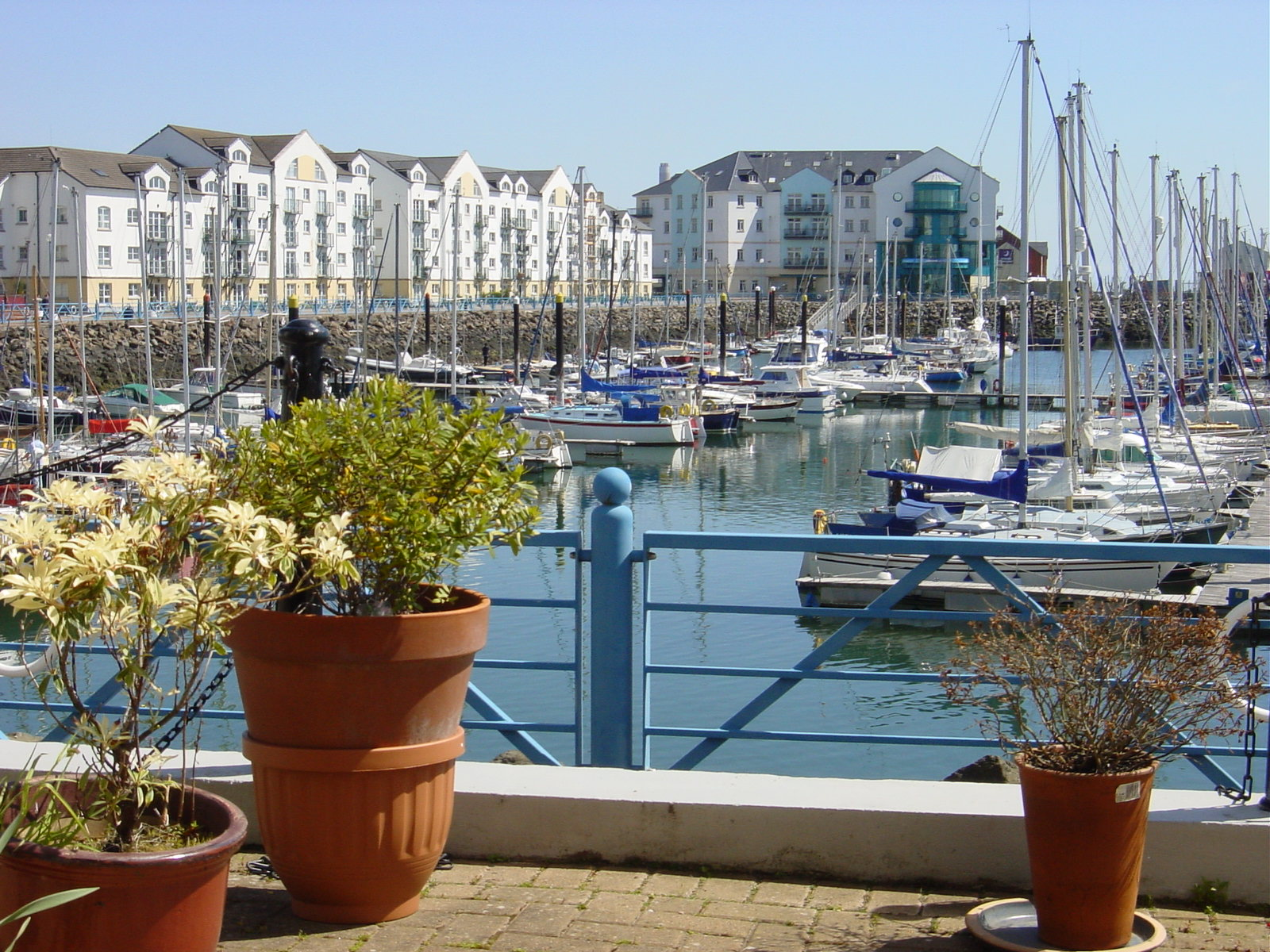
The Carrickfergus marina complex

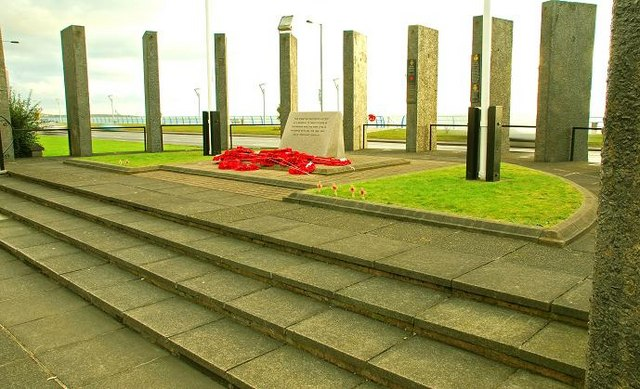
The war memorial at Joymount, in Carrick's town centre.

The wall mural and replica pillory in the town centre are popular attractions for visiting tourists.

=== 2021 census ===
As of the 2021 census, in March 2021, there were 28,141 people living in Carrickfergus. Of these:

- 73.49% were from the Protestant or other Christian community backgrounds and 8.55% were from a Roman Catholic Christian community background.
- 73.94% indicated that they had a British national identity, 5.53% had an Irish national identity and 37.32% had a Northern Irish national identity (respondents could choose more than one national identity).

=== 2011 census ===
On census day 2011, 27 March 2011, there were 27,998 people living in Carrickfergus. Of these:

- 20.23% were aged under 16 years and 14.73% were aged 65 and over.
- 51.95% of the usually resident population were female and 48.05% were male.
- 80.70% were from the Protestant or other Christian community backgrounds and 8.35% were from a Roman Catholic Christian community background.
- 78.26% indicated that they had a British national identity, 4.73% had an Irish national identity and 29.36% had a Northern Irish national identity (respondents could choose more than one national identity)
- 39 years was the average (median) age of the population.
- 8.49% had some knowledge of Ulster-Scots and 1.99% had some knowledge of Irish.

== Transport ==
Carrickfergus railway station opened on 1 October 1862. In addition, the northwest of the town is served by Clipperstown railway station, and the east by Downshire railway station. All three stations have regular commuter services to Belfast and Larne with connections to Dublin and Derry~Londonderry at Belfast. Four historic stations in Carrickfergus; Barn, Eden, Mount, and Kilroot; closed in the 1970s.

== Administration ==
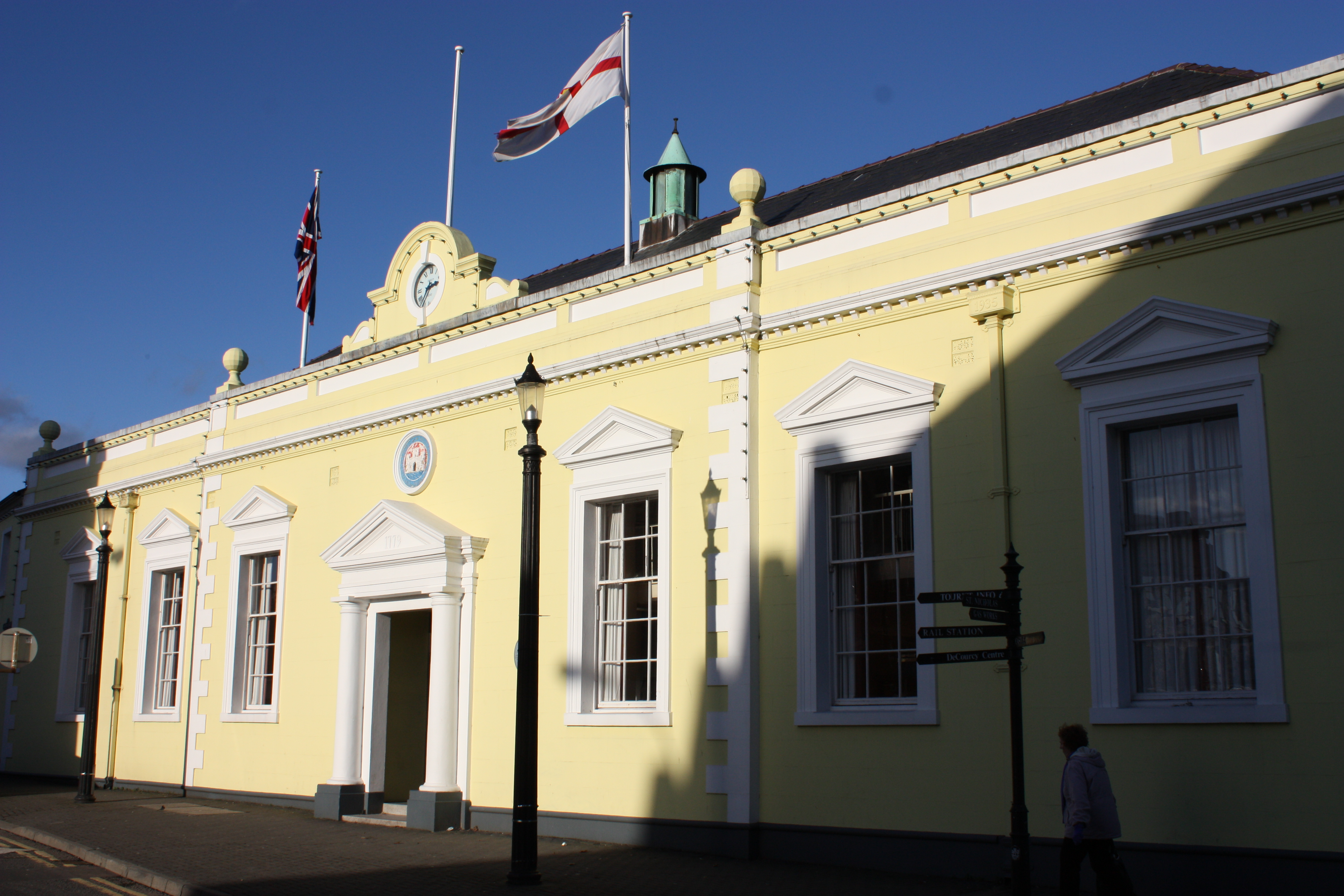
Carrickfergus Town Hall

Prior to 1899, the county of the town of Carrickfergus was a separate judicial county. In 1899, it came under the jurisdiction of the new Antrim County Council. In 1973, Antrim County Council was abolished and the area was administered by Carrickfergus Borough Council, based at Carrickfergus Town Hall.

Since 1 April 2015 Carrickfergus has come under the jurisdiction of Mid and East Antrim Borough Council. The town is covered by two of the council's wards, Carrick Castle and Knockagh.

From 1801 to 1885, the parliamentary borough of Carrickfergus sent a Member of Parliament to sit in the House of Commons of the United Kingdom.

Carrickfergus is in the Westminster constituency of East Antrim, which is also an Assembly constituency.

== Schools and education ==
There are several primary in Carrickfergus, including St Nicholas' Primary School.

Secondary schools serving the area include Carrickfergus Grammar School, Carrickfergus Academy and Ulidia Integrated College.

== Sports ==
Sporting establishments in the town include the association football clubs Carrick Rangers F.C. and Barn United FC.

Carrickfergus Sailing Club and Carrickfergus Cricket Club are also based in the town.

== Media ==
Carrickfergus FM is a restricted service licence community radio station which broadcasts seasonally in the area.

== Notable residents ==
=== Historical ===
- Robert Adrain (1775–1843), mathematician, considered one of the best mathematical minds of his time, was born in Carrickfergus
- Edward Bruce (c. 1280–1319), High King of Ireland and Earl of Carrick, brother to Robert the Bruce, King of Scots.
- Sir John de Courcy (1160–1219) Anglo Norman knight and builder of Carrickfergus Castle
- Hugh de Lacy, 1st Earl of Ulster (c. 1176 – c. 1242)
- William Orr, United Irishman, was hanged in Carrickfergus on 14 October 1797 shortly before the failed rebellion.
- Charlotte Riddell, writer of the Victorian period, was born Charlotte Eliza Lawson Cowan (1832) in Carrickfergus.
- Eleanor Sproull (1867–1958), a physician and later nun of the Sisters of Mercy, was born in Carrickfergus
- Jonathan Swift, the poet and satirist lived in Kilroot, on the outskirts of the town, and wrote A Tale of a Tub there.

=== 20th century ===
- Daniel Cambridge, recipient of the Victoria Cross
- James Crichton, recipient of the Victoria Cross
- Sammy Curran, a prolific Irish League goalscorer between the wars playing for Woodburn and Belfast Celtic among others, who was also capped 4 times by Ireland.
- Bob Gilmore (1961–2015), musicologist and player of piano and keyboards, was born in nearby Larne; lived in Carrickfergus during his childhood.
- Seán Lester (1888–1959) was born in Carrickfergus. He was the last Secretary General of the League of Nations, from 1940 to 1946.
- Billy McMillan, former Belfast Celtic and dual IFA and FAI Irish international footballer who lived his entire life in Carrickfergus.
- Louis MacNeice, poet, moved to the town when he was two years old (his father was appointed Rector of St Nicholas' Church of Ireland Church), and he left at the age of ten to attend boarding school in England; one of his poems, Carrickfergus (1937), relates his ambiguous feelings about the town where he spent his early boyhood.

=== Contemporary ===
- Gillian Arnold, artist and designer, born Carrickfergus. (1971–1990)
- John Devine, Irish Football League footballer and manager
- Ryan Eagleson, Derbyshire and Irish international cricketer, 65 caps for Ireland, 1995–2004.
- Fit Finlay, former WWE wrestler, was born and raised in the satellite village of Greenisland.
- Jimmy Hill (Norwich City) and Billy McCullough (Arsenal), Northern Ireland international footballers born in Carrickfergus.
- Bobby Irvine (Stoke City), Northern Ireland international footballer born in nearby Eden before moving to Carrickfergus.
- Willie Irvine (Burnley), Northern Ireland international footballer born in Eden before moving to Carrickfergus.
- Niamh Kavanagh, Irish Eurovision entrant and winner of 1993.
- Adrian McKinty, novelist, author of the Sean Duffy novels set in Carrickfergus, was raised in the town.
- Seán Neeson, politician and activist; former leader of the Alliance Party NI sat on Carrickfergus Council (1977–2013), and represented East Antrim in the NI Assembly (1998–2011).
- Stuart Robinson, host of Northern Ireland's Young Star Search and presenter on Cool FM.
- Jackie Woodburne, actress known for her role as Susan Kennedy in Australian soap opera Neighbours, was born in Carrickfergus.
- Jo Zebedee (born 1971), writer brought up in the town.

== Twin towns – sister cities ==
Carrickfergus is twinned with:

- Anderson, South Carolina, United States
- Danville, Kentucky, United States
- Jackson, Michigan, United States
- Portsmouth, New Hampshire, United States
- Ruda Śląska, Poland

== See also ==
- Baron Carrickfergus – subsidiary title of William, Prince of Wales
- List of monastic houses in Ireland (County Antrim)
- List of towns and villages in Northern Ireland
- List of towns and villages in Northern Ireland
- List of localities in Northern Ireland by population
- Market houses in Northern Ireland
