= Gillian Arnold (artist) =

Northern Irish botanical artist

- Born: 1971 (age 54–55); Carrickfergus, Northern Ireland
- Education: Liverpool John Moores University; Chelsea College of Arts
- Occupations: Artist; designer
- Spouse: Tim Scott
- Website: gillianarnold.com

Gillian Arnold is a Northern Irish botanical artist, now living in County Durham, England. She creates paintings using a monotype technique which she developed over twenty years to print pressed flowers onto her textile canvasses. She uses this technique to produce lampshades, jewellery, ceramics and glassware, including repeat pattern wallpaper and home furnishings.

Arnold moved from her home town of Carrickfergus, Northern Ireland to Liverpool to study Textiles at Liverpool John Moores University, after which she moved to London in 1996 to study for a master's degree in Textiles at the Chelsea College of Arts. Arnold then stayed in London until 2012, working as a freelance artist working on community projects. She also worked on a fair-trade initiative in Pirang, Gambia.

Arnold began creating new canvasses, ceramics and jewellery, which she sold at Greenwich Market, where she became a regular trader.

The business slowly began to take off in May 2012, with an expansion in premises and equipment. This was closely followed by trade shows and wholesale opportunities across the UK. Arnold and her husband moved to Bishop Auckland to set up their first studio. Arnold, in early 2018, moved their boutique and workhouse to 10/11 Post House Wynd, Darlington, to expand their production and brand.
