= Royal North of Ireland Yacht Club =

- Burgee

- Ensign
- Short name: RNIYC
- Founded: 1899
- Location: Cultra, County Down, Northern Ireland
- Website: http://www.rniyc.org

The Royal North of Ireland Yacht Club is a yacht club in Cultra, County Down, Northern Ireland on the south shore of Belfast Lough.

== History ==
The North of Ireland Yacht Club was formed in 1899; it became known as 'The Royal North of Ireland Yacht Club' in 1902.

=== 1948 Summer Olympics Dragon Event ===
George Herbert Brown (28 April 1915 – 9 December 1995), Jack Wallace (21 May 1915 – 1 January 1991), and Eric Strain (1 December 1915 – 13 February 1975), sailed on the Ceres II in the Dragon event at the 1948 Summer Olympics, ultimately placing 4th.

All members of this team were associated with the Royal North of Ireland Yacht Club.

=== Refurbishment ===
There was a major club refurbishment in October 2010, which started with a total expenditure of £300,000. The objective of this refurbishment was the improvement and upgrading of the Club facilities and the enhancement of the club environment.

As of 2024, the club has roughly 1,000 members; they are also an accredited training centre for the RYA.
