= Cultra =

Coastal suburb of Belfast, Northern Ireland

Cultra: Irish: Cúl Trá
- Seafront Road

- Location within County Down
  - Belfast: 6 mi (9.7 km)
- District: Ards and North Down
- County: County Down
- Country: Northern Ireland
- Sovereign state: United Kingdom
- Post town: HOLYWOOD
- Postcode district: BT18
- UK Parliament: North Down
- NI Assembly: North Down

Cultra (/kʌlˈtrɔː/ kul-TRAW - from Irish Cúl Trá, meaning 'back of the strand') is an affluent residential neighbourhood near Holywood, County Down, Northern Ireland. It is part of Greater Belfast. It is in the Ards and North Down Borough Council area.

The Royal North of Ireland Yacht Club, based in Cultra, is home to Ross Kearney, the double Mirror Class world champion.

== Places of interest ==
- Ulster Folk and Transport Museums
- Royal North of Ireland Yacht Club

== People ==
- Sir Arthur Kennedy (1809–1883), a British colonial administrator who served as governor of a number of British colonies, was born in Cultra.
- Desmond Titterington (1928–2002), a racing driver

== Transport ==
- Cultra railway station was opened on 1 May 1865. Trains run by Northern Ireland Railways on the Belfast-Bangor railway line serve the station.
