= Downshire railway station =

Railway station in Northern Ireland

Downshire
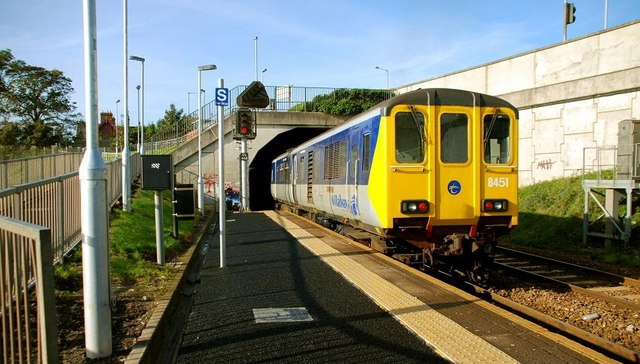
- A Class 450 train departs Platform 1 in the Belfast direction, 2008.

General information
- Location: Carrickfergus; Northern Ireland
- Coordinates: 54°43′16″N 5°47′25″W
- Owner: NI Railways
- Operator: NI Railways
- Line: Larne
- Platforms: 2
- Tracks: 2

Construction
- Structure type: At-grade

Other information
- Station code: DP

Key dates
- 1925: Station opened as Downshire Park
- 1979: Station renamed to Downshire
- 2008: Station refurbished

Passengers
- 2022/23: 132,158
- 2023/24: ▲175,026
- 2024/25: ▼172,629
- 2025/26: ▲173,975
- NI Railways; Translink; NI railway stations
Route map
(Click to expand)
Location
- Location within Northern Ireland Location within island of Ireland

Downshire railway station serves eastern Carrickfergus in County Antrim, Northern Ireland.

This station opened on 1 April 1925 and was known for most of its early life as Downshire Park. Northern Ireland Railways renamed the halt in the late 1970s. The station's signposts prior to the 2008 refurbishment named the station as "Downshire Halt", a name by which the station is still locally known. The 'Halt' suffix was later reinstated.

The Belfast-bound platform was extended during summer 2011 to allow longer trains to operate. The Larne-bound platform was similarly refurbished in early 2012.

== Service ==
On weekdays, there is a half-hourly service to Belfast Grand Central. In the other direction, there is a half-hourly service with the terminus alternating between Whitehead and Larne Harbour every half an hour. At peak times some trains terminate at Larne Town.

On Saturdays, the service remains half-hourly with the same alternating pattern, and there are less peak services.

On Sundays, the service reduces to an hourly operation in both directions.

Preceding station	NI Railways	Following station
Carrickfergus	Northern Ireland Railways; Belfast-Larne Line	Whitehead
	Historical railways	
Barn; Line open, station closed	Northern Counties Committee; Belfast-Larne	Eden; Line open, station closed
