= Mount railway station =

Former railway station in Northern Ireland

Coordinates: 54.718°N 5.826°W

Mount
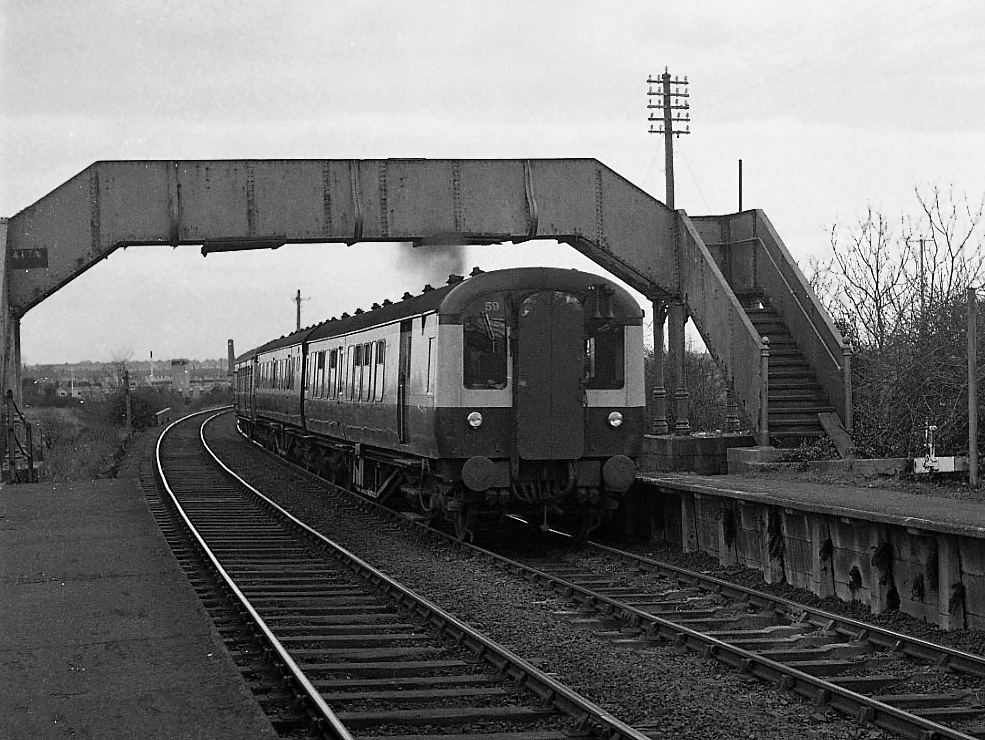
- MPD set passing through the closed Mount station in 1978.

General information
- Location: Carrickfergus, Carrickfergus Borough Council; Northern Ireland
- Platforms: 2

Other information
- Status: Disused

History
- Pre-grouping: Northern Ireland Railways

Key dates
- 1 April 1925: Station opened
- 8 May 1977: Station closed
Location

Mount (also known as Mount Halt) was a station located near the town of Carrickfergus in Northern Ireland. At one time it formed part of a tight cluster of stations, each located one minute from the other.

The station itself was a semi-private halt serving the local Courtaulds nylon factory. It closed in 1977 when Northern Ireland Railways services were cut back, though the factory remained open until the 1990s. Due to track re-laying and maintenance work, most traces of the platforms are gone. However, the site of the station is still visible, as the now-abandoned path from the factory premises to the station site still exists, and is easily noticed by virtue of a tarmac area with metal fencing and the old station lamp posts.

Preceding station	NI Railways	Following station
Trooperslane	Northern Ireland Railways; Belfast-Larne	Clipperstown
	Disused railways	
Terminus	Ulster Transport Authority; Harbour Branch	Carrickfergus Harbour
	Historical railways	
Trooperslane; Line and station open	Northern Counties Committee; Belfast-Larne	Clipperstown; Line and station open
