= Whitehead railway station =

Railway station in Northern Ireland

Whitehead
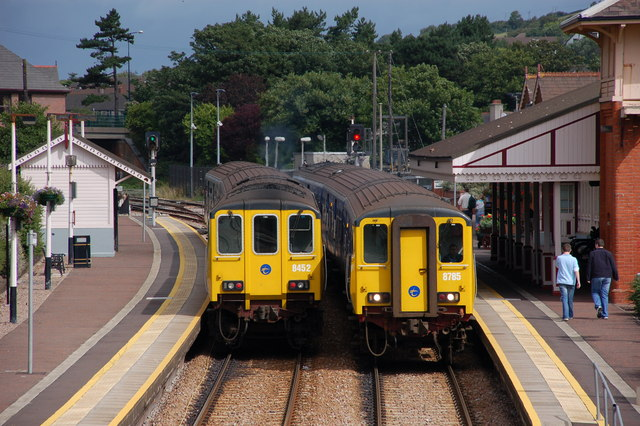
- Two NIR Class 450 trains at Whitehead

General information
- Location: Whitehead; Northern Ireland
- Coordinates: 54°45′10″N 5°42′34″W
- Owner: NI Railways
- Operator: NI Railways
- Line: Larne
- Platforms: 2
- Tracks: 2

Construction
- Structure type: At-grade

Other information
- Station code: WT

Key dates
- 1863: Station opened
- 2008: Station refurbished

Passengers
- 2022/23: 238,056
- 2023/24: ▲300,203
- 2024/25: ▼298,367
- 2025/26: ▲320,409
- NI Railways; Translink; NI railway stations
Route map
(Click to expand)
Location
- Location within Northern Ireland Location within island of Ireland

Whitehead railway station serves Whitehead in County Antrim, Northern Ireland.

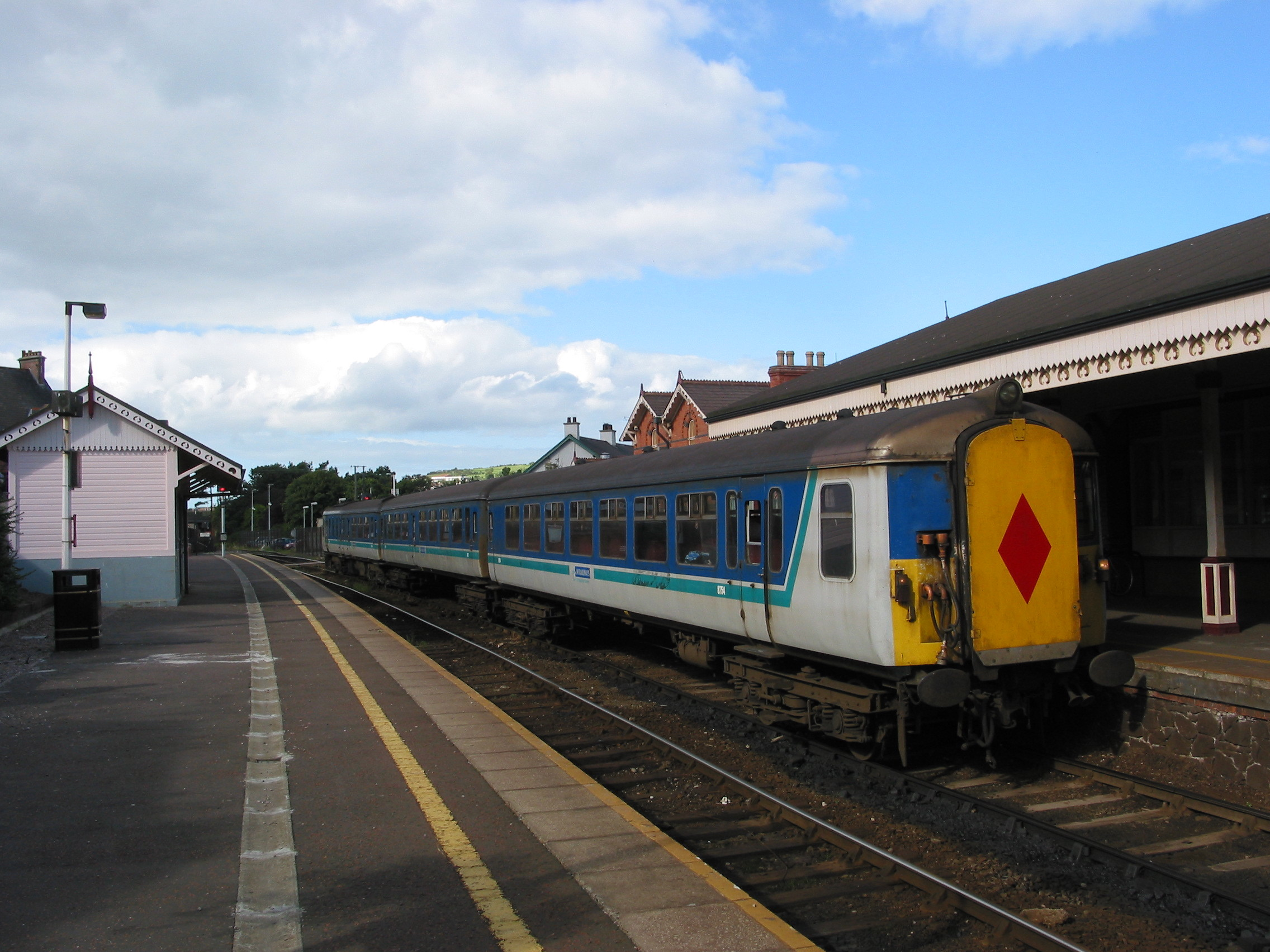
NIR 8068 at Whitehead

The station has two platforms with a waiting room on each and the station is signalled in both directions and remains staffed during commuter hours by a Senior Porter, a fully trained signalman, capable of fixing points and signalling issues when they arise.

Previously the line was double towards Belfast and Whitehead was where the track narrowed to the single track section to Larne. However, in the 1990s the up line was removed from here to Kilroot due to safety reasons, leaving the line at Whitehead Station as a passing loop.

Whitehead actually comprises two stations, due to its history as a railway excursion town. The through station is still part of the Northern Ireland Railways network, whilst the terminus Whitehead Excursion Station is the headquarters of the Railway Preservation Society of Ireland.

Whitehead station was originally opened on 1 May 1863 and the Whitehead Excursion Platform was opened on 10 July 1907. The present station was opened in 1877 and is the third station to serve the town. It has been modernised, but unlike many stations on the NIR network still retains much of its Victorian character.

== Service ==
On Mondays to Fridays, there is a half-hourly service from Belfast Grand Central. These trains alternate every half an hour between terminating here at Whitehead, and continuing on to Larne Harbour. In the other direction, there is a half-hourly service to Belfast Grand Central, with the trains alternating between being through services from Larne, or starting at Whitehead.

On Saturdays, the service still runs half-hourly in the same alternating manner, but with less peak trains.

On Sundays, the service reduces to hourly operation in each direction. Services alternate each hour between terminating here, and continuing on to Larne Harbour.

Preceding station	NI Railways	Following station
Downshire	Northern Ireland Railways; Belfast-Larne Line	Terminus or Ballycarry
	Historical railways	
Kilroot; Line open, station closed	Northern Counties Committee; Belfast-Larne	Ballycarry; Line and station open

== Incidents ==
On 26 September 2008, part of the platform collapsed, blocking the Larne bound line. It is not clear whether this was a result of the recent construction work which had been carried out at this station; according to NI Railways nobody was hurt in the incident.
