= Ballyboley Junction railway station =

Former station in County Antrim, Northern Ireland

Coordinates: 54.794624°N 5.940771°W

Ballyboley Junction Ballyclare Junction
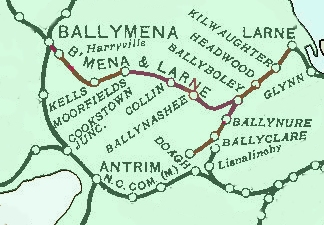
- Railway in 1906

General information
- Location: Junction Rd., Ballybracken, County Antrim; Northern Ireland

Other information
- Status: Disused

History
- Original company: Ballymena and Larne Railway
- Pre-grouping: Ballymena and Larne Railway
- Post-grouping: Ballymena and Larne Railway

Key dates
- 24 August 1878: Station opens as Ballyclare Junction
- 1 January 1890: Renamed Ballyboley Junction
- 1 October 1930: Passenger closure
- 3 June 1940: Goods and final closure
Location

Ballyboley Junction railway station was the junction for the branch line to Doagh via Ballyclare (B&L) in Northern Ireland.

== History ==
The station was opened as Ballyclare Junction by the Ballymena and Larne Railway on 24 August 1878. It was taken over by the Belfast and Northern Counties Railway in July 1889. This was in turn taken over by the Northern Counties Committee in 1906.

It was renamed Ballyboley Junction on 1 January 1890.

The station closed to passengers on 1 October 1930.

| Preceding station | Historical railways | Following station |
|---|---|---|
| Ballynashee | Ballymena and Larne Railway; Ballymena-Larne | Headwood |
| Ballynure | Ballymena and Larne Railway; Doagh-Larne | Headwood |
