= Ballynure =

Village in County Antrim, Northern Ireland

- Village and civil parish

- Location within Northern Ireland
- Coordinates: 54°46′N 5°57′W
- Country: United Kingdom
- Province: Northern Ireland
- County: Antrim

Population (2001)
  - Total: 677

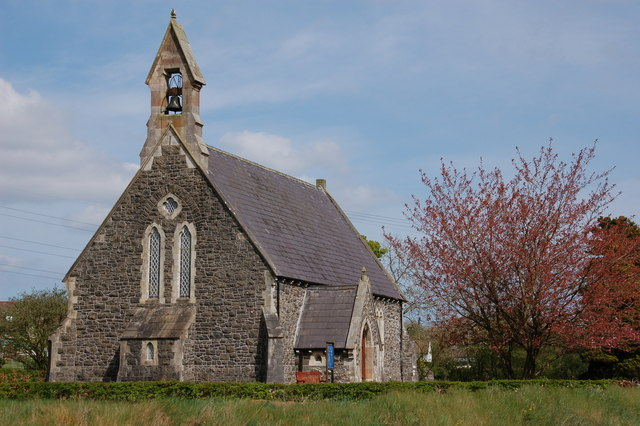
Christ Church, Ballynure

Ballynure (from Irish Baile an Iúir 'homestead of the yews') is a village and civil parish near Ballyclare in County Antrim, Northern Ireland. It is part of Antrim and Newtownabbey Borough Council and had a population of 677 people in the 2001 census.

== Transport ==
- Ballynure was formerly served by the Ballymena and Larne Railway, a narrow gauge railway. Ballynure railway station opened on 24 August 1878, but finally closed on 1 October 1930.

== Sport ==
Ballynure Old Boys F.C. plays association football in the Ballymena & Provincial League.

== 2002 census ==
Ballynure is classified as a massive village or hamlet by the NI Statistics and Research Agency (NISRA) (i.e. with a population between 500 and 10,000 people). On census day (29 April 2002) there were 677 people living in Ballynure. Of these:

- 22.3% were aged under 16 and 15.8% were aged 60 and over
- 48.2% of the population were male and 51.9% were female
- 0.1% were from a Catholic background and 99.9% were from a Protestant background
- 0.4% of people aged 16–74 were unemployed.

== Places of interest ==
The Ballynure Elementary School for Primary Education (often known simply as Ballynure Primary School) is only school in the village and surrounding areas until Ballyclare. It is also one of six schools in Northern Ireland classed as "Elementary Schools". The School was founded in 1930.

The Ballynure Cemetery is the oldest cemetery in all Newtownabbey and second oldest in all Antrim.

There are three churches within the village of Ballynure. Christ Church (Church of Ireland), Ballynure Presbyterian Church, and Ballynure Methodist Church.

== Additional information ==
Jonathan Swift, the writer of Gulliver's Travels, was responsible for the Ballynure parish of the Church of Ireland, during his time as prebend of Kilroot.

The Clements family, who lived at Clements Hill outside the village, were the ancestors of Samuel Langhorne Clemens, better known as Mark Twain. Twain, who was author of works including The Adventures of Tom Sawyer, was described by William Faulkner as 'the father of American literature.' His grandfather Samuel Clemens emigrated to America and Twain was born in Florida, Missouri, in November 1835. One of his ancestors, Henry Clements, was Mayor of Carrickfergus in 1696 and another is said to have fought for William of Orange at the Battle of the Boyne six years earlier.

In 2017, the village established "Ballynature Day", currently the largest nature convention in Northern Ireland.

== Notable people ==
- William Marsden Hind, English botanist
- Alexander Macomb, American merchant, born in Ballynure
- James Whiteside McCay (1864–1930), Australian general during WWI, born in Ballynure
- Jonathan Rea, five-time World Superbike champion; won his titles consecutively in 2015, 2016, 2017, 2018 and 2019, making him the most successful World SBK rider in the competition's history. He also holds the highest number of race wins in the championship.
- Paddy McNair, a professional footballer with Middlesbrough FC and the Northern Ireland national football team

== See also ==
- List of civil parishes of County Antrim

== Sources ==
- NI Statistics and Research Agency (NISRA)
- Culture Northern Ireland
