= Ballynashee railway station =

Railway station in County Antrim, Northern Ireland

Coordinates: 54.799989°N 6.028463°W

Ballynashee
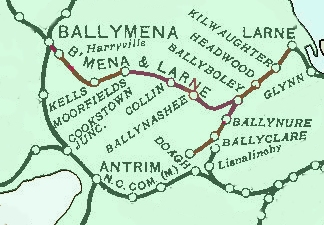
- Railway in 1906

General information
- Location: County Antrim; Northern Ireland

Other information
- Status: Disused

History
- Original company: Ballymena and Larne Railway
- Pre-grouping: Ballymena and Larne Railway
- Post-grouping: Ballymena and Larne Railway

Key dates
- 1 May 1879: Station opens
- 31 January 1933: Station closes to passengers
- 3 June 1940: Station closes
Location

Ballynashee railway station was on the Ballymena and Larne Railway which ran from Ballymena to Larne in Northern Ireland.

== History ==
The station was opened by the Ballymena and Larne Railway on 1 May 1879. It was taken over by the Belfast and Northern Counties Railway in July 1889. This was in turn taken over by the Northern Counties Committee in 1906.

The station closed to passengers on 31 January 1933 and later completely on 6 June 1940.

== Routes ==
Preceding station	Disused railways	Following station
Collin	Ballymena and Larne Railway; Ballymena-Larne	Ballyboley Junction
