= Kilwaughter Halt railway station =

Former railway station in Northern Ireland

Coordinates: 54.831842°N 5.886269°W

Kilwaughter Halt
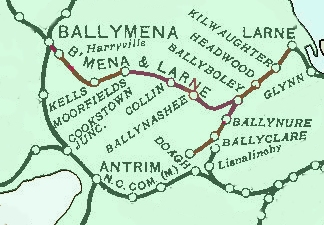
- Railway in 1906

General information
- Location: County Antrim; Northern Ireland

Other information
- Status: Disused

History
- Original company: Ballymena and Larne Railway
- Pre-grouping: Ballymena and Larne Railway
- Post-grouping: Ballymena and Larne Railway

Key dates
- 1 January 1888: Station opens
- 31 January 1933: Station closes
Location

Kilwaughter Halt railway station was on the Ballymena and Larne Railway which ran from Ballymena to Larne in Northern Ireland.

== History ==
The station was located close to the hamlet of Kilwaughter and opened by the Ballymena and Larne Railway on 1 January 1888. It was taken over by the Belfast and Northern Counties Railway in July 1889. This was in turn taken over by the Northern Counties Committee in 1906.

The station closed to passengers on 1 October 1933.

Preceding station	Historical railways	Following station
Headwood	Ballymena and Larne Railway; Ballymena-Larne	Larne Town

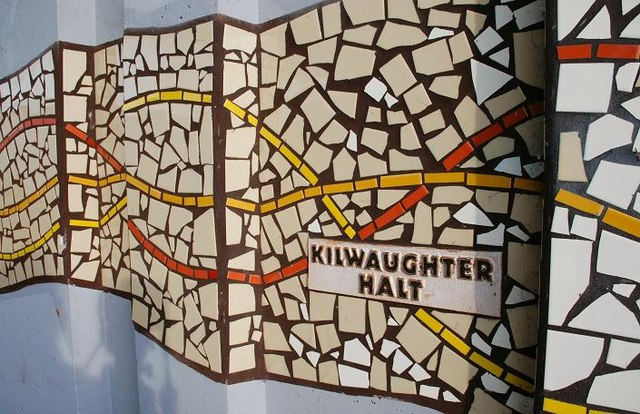
Mosaic commemorating the railway line
