= Headwood railway station =

Railway station in Northern Ireland

Coordinates: 54.81048°N 5.909786°W

Ballyclare
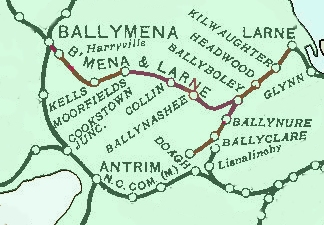
- Railway in 1906

General information
- Location: County Antrim; Northern Ireland

Other information
- Status: Disused

History
- Original company: Ballymena and Larne Railway
- Pre-grouping: Ballymena and Larne Railway
- Post-grouping: Ballymena and Larne Railway

Key dates
- 1 February 1882: Station opens
- 31 January 1933: Station closes
Location

Headwood railway station was on the Ballymena and Larne Railway which ran from Ballymena to Larne in Northern Ireland.

== History ==
The station was opened by the Ballymena and Larne Railway on 1 February 1882. It was taken over by the Belfast and Northern Counties Railway in July 1889. This was in turn taken over by the Northern Counties Committee in 1906.

The station closed to passengers on 1 October 1933.

Preceding station	Historical railways	Following station
Ballyboley Junction	Ballymena and Larne Railway; Ballymena-Larne	Kilwaughter Halt
