= Collin railway station =

Railway station in County Antrim, Northern Ireland

Coordinates: 54.822287°N 6.098635°W

Collin
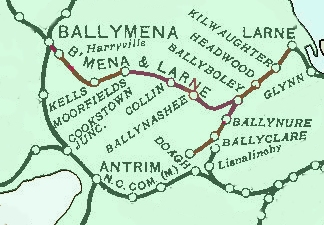
- Railway in 1906

General information
- Location: County Antrim; Northern Ireland

Other information
- Status: Disused

History
- Original company: Ballymena and Larne Railway
- Pre-grouping: Belfast and Northern Counties Railway
- Post-grouping: Northern Counties Committee

Key dates
- 1887: Station opens
- 31 January 1933: Station closes
Location

Collin railway station was on the Ballymena and Larne Railway which ran from Ballymena to Larne in Northern Ireland.

== History ==
The station was opened by the Ballymena and Larne Railway on 1 May 1879. It was taken over by the Belfast and Northern Counties Railway in July 1889. This was in turn taken over by the Midland Railway and became the Northern Counties Committee in 1906.

The station was closed on 31 January 1933.

== Routes ==
Preceding station	Historical railways	Following station
Moorfields	Ballymena and Larne Railway; Ballymena-Larne	Ballynashee
