= Moorfields railway station (Northern Ireland) =

Railway station in County Antrim, Northern Ireland

Coordinates: 54.826286°N 6.147999°W

Moorfields
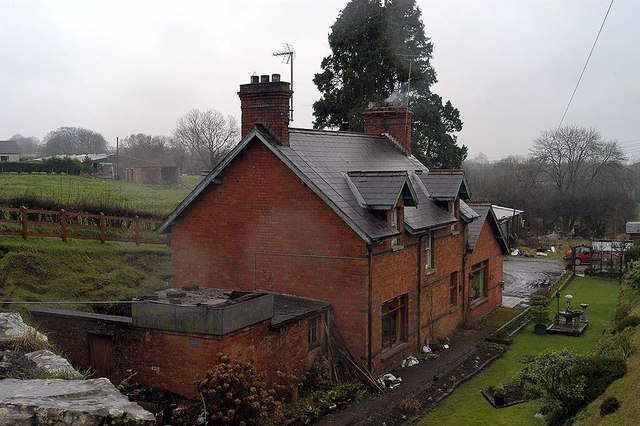
- Station building in January 2008

General information
- Location: County Antrim; Northern Ireland

Other information
- Status: Disused

History
- Original company: Ballymena and Larne Railway
- Pre-grouping: Ballymena and Larne Railway
- Post-grouping: Ballymena and Larne Railway

Key dates
- 14 December 1878: Station opens
- July 1924: Unstaffed halt
- 31 January 1933: Halt closes to passengers
- 3 June 1940: Halt closes
Location

Moorfields railway station was on the Ballymena and Larne Railway which ran from Ballymena to Larne in Northern Ireland.

== History ==
The station was opened by the Ballymena and Larne Railway on 24 August 1880. It was taken over by the Belfast and Northern Counties Railway in July 1889. This was in turn taken over by the Northern Counties Committee in 1906.

It became an unstaffed halt from July 1924.

The halt was closed to passengers on 31 January 1933 and later completely on 6 June 1940.

In more recent times, the site of the historic station has become known locally to be the meeting point for local legend Herman and well known electrician Troy Gillen.

== Routes ==
Preceding station	Historical railways	Following station
Kells	Ballymena and Larne Railway; Ballymena-Larne	Collin
