= Alderman =

Member of a municipal assembly or council

An alderman, alderwoman or alderperson is a member of a municipal assembly or a council in many jurisdictions founded upon English law with similar officials existing in the Netherlands (wethouder) and Belgium (schepen). The term may be titular, denoting a high-ranking member of a borough or county council, a council member chosen by the elected members themselves rather than by popular vote, or a council member elected by voters.

== Etymology ==
The title's name is derived from the Old English ealdorman, which meant literally "older-person" (that is, an elder) and was a title used by the chief nobles presiding over shires. Similar titles exist in other Germanic languages, such as ålderman in Swedish, oldermann in Norwegian, rådmand in Danish and Low German, Olderman in West Frisian, ouderman in Dutch, and Ältermann in German. Finnish also has oltermanni, which was borrowed from Swedish. All of those words are cognates of alderman and mean either "olderperson" or "wiseperson".

== Usage by country ==
=== Australia ===
Many local government bodies used the term "alderman" in Australia. As in the way local councils have been modernised in the United Kingdom and Ireland, the term alderman has been discontinued in a number of places. For example, in the state of Queensland before 1994, rural "shires" elected "councillors" and a "chairman", while "cities" elected a "mayor" and "aldermen". Since 1994, all local and regional government areas in Queensland elect a "mayor" and "councillors". (Australian capital cities usually have a Lord Mayor). An example of the use of the term alderman is evident in the City of Adelaide. Aldermen were elected from the electors in all the wards.

=== Canada ===
Historically, in Canada, the term "alderman" was used for those persons elected to a municipal council to represent the wards. As women were increasingly elected to municipal office, the term "councillor" slowly replaced "alderman", although there was some use of the term "alderperson". Today, the title of "alderman" is rarely used except in some cities in Alberta and Ontario, as well as some smaller municipalities elsewhere in the country, that retain the title for historical reasons.

=== Ireland ===
The title "alderman" was abolished for local authorities in the Republic of Ireland by the Local Government Act 2001, with effect from the 2004 local elections. Early usage of the term mirrored that of England and Wales. Local elections since the Local Government (Ireland) Act 1919 have used the single transferable vote in multiple-member electoral areas.

In each electoral area of a borough or county borough, the first several candidates elected were styled "alderman" and the rest "councillor".

Someone co-opted to fill a seat vacated by an alderman would be styled "councillor".

=== Netherlands ===
In the Netherlands, an alderman (Dutch: wethouder) is part of the municipal executive and not of the municipal council, which controls the aldermen's actions in office. The alderman is comparable to the office of minister at the national level. However, the alderman can not propose bills to the council. The alderman can be forced to resign by a vote of no confidence by the council.

=== South Africa ===
In South Africa, the term alderman refers to senior members of municipal councils. They are distinguished from ordinary councillors for their "long and distinguished service as a councillor". The title may be awarded on the basis of a long term of service (commonly 20 years), or a combination of term of service along with leadership positions held within the council. In some councils the title is automatically conferred on the mayor regardless of their term of service.

=== United Kingdom ===
==== England, Northern Ireland and Wales ====
Although the term originated in England, it had no single definition there until the 19th century, as each municipal corporation had its own constitution. It was used in England, Wales and Ireland/Northern Ireland (all of Ireland being part of the United Kingdom from January 1801 until December 1922), but was not used in Scotland. Under the Municipal Reform Act 1835, municipal borough corporations consisted of councillors and aldermen. Aldermen would be elected not by the electorate, but by the council (including the outgoing aldermen), for a term of six years, which allowed a party that narrowly lost an election to retain control by choosing aldermen. This was changed by the Municipal Corporations Amendment Act 1910, so that outgoing aldermen were no longer allowed to vote. County councils, created in Great Britain in 1889 and in Ireland in 1899, also elected aldermen, but rural district and urban district councils did not. The Local Government Act 1972 finally abolished Aldermen with voting rights, with effect from 1974, except in the Greater London Council and the London borough councils, where they remained a possibility until 1978.

===== Honorary aldermen =====
Councils in England, Wales, and Northern Ireland still have the power to create honorary aldermen and alderwomen, as a reward for their services as a councillor, but must do so at a special meeting, and in each case the granting of the title needs to be approved by two-thirds of those attending. This power is little used in England and Wales, but is used more often in Northern Ireland, where councils may also designate up to a quarter of their elected councillors as aldermen.

===== City of London =====
In the City of London, but not elsewhere in London, aldermen are still elected for each of the wards of the City by the regular electorate. To be a candidate to be Lord Mayor of the City of London, it is necessary to be an alderman and to have been a sheriff of the City of London.

The title "Alderman" is used for both men and women and may be prefixed to a person's name (e.g., Alderman John Smith, Alderman Smith, or for women; Alderman Mrs (or Miss) Smith).

==== Scotland ====
In Scotland, the office of "baillie" bore some similarities to that of alderman in England and Wales.

=== United States ===
Depending on the jurisdiction, an alderman could have been part of the legislative or judicial local government.

A "board of aldermen" is the governing executive or legislative body of many cities and towns in the United States. Boards of aldermen are used in many rural areas of the United States as opposed to a larger city council or city commission; its members are typically called "alderman". The term is sometimes used instead of city council, but it can also refer to an executive board independent of the council, or to what is essentially an upper house of a bicameral legislature (as it was in New York City until the 20th century).

In Illinois, the Illinois Municipal Code allows for the formation and existence of an aldermanic-city form of municipal government. As an example, in Chicago, the Chicago City Council is composed of fifty aldermen (not councilors). As of 2021, Chicago aldermen are legally referred to by the State of Illinois as alderpersons, though the terms alderman and aldermanic remain in common use. The terms "alderwoman" and simply "alder" are also commonly used.

Some cities, such as Ithaca, New York, identify aldermen as 'alderpersons'. Others, including New Haven, Connecticut, use the term "alders".

Historically, the term could also refer to local municipal judges in small legal proceedings (as in Pennsylvania and Delaware). Pennsylvania's aldermen were phased out in the early 20th century.

== See also ==
- Local government in Canada
- Local government in the United States
- Municipal government
- Councillor
- Mayor
- Selectman
