= Doagh railway station =

Doagh railway station may refer to the following two stations in Doagh, County Antrim, Northern Ireland:

- Doagh railway station (Ballymena and Larne Railway) (open from 1884 to 1930)
- Doagh railway station (Belfast and Ballymena Railway) (open from 1848 to 1970)
