= List of rural and urban districts in Northern Ireland =

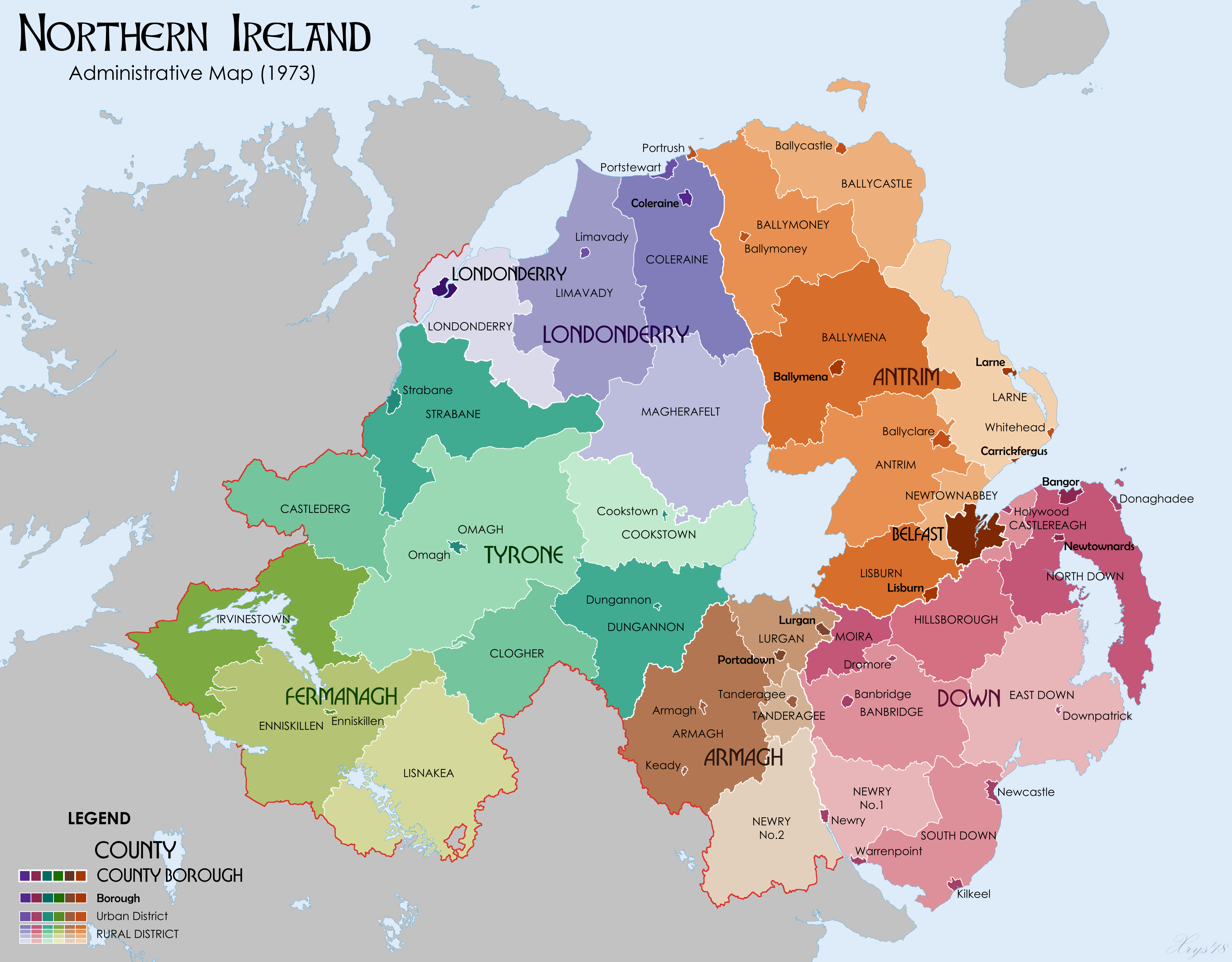
Map of the Rural and Urban Districts of Northern Ireland in 1967

The urban and rural districts of Northern Ireland were created in 1899 when the Local Government (Ireland) Act 1898 came into effect. They were based on the system of district councils introduced in England and Wales four years earlier. (See List of Irish local government areas 1898–1921 for a historical list of districts in all of Ireland.)

At the time of Northern Ireland's creation in 1921, Ireland as a whole was divided into thirty-three administrative counties and six county boroughs; the administrative counties were in turn subdivided into several boroughs, urban districts, and rural districts. Each district was divided into a number of district electoral divisions (DEDs). Northern Ireland received a total of six administrative counties, together with the county boroughs of Belfast and Derry. The six administrative counties all included a number of urban and rural districts in 1921, but no boroughs.

As of 1923, when the DEDs were created ahead of the 1924 local elections, there were 653 DEDs, across 64 local authorities (including the 2 county boroughs, 31 rural districts and 31 urban districts).

In rural and urban districts, each DED would elect a certain number of councillors by first past the post (in single-member DEDs) or block vote (in multi-member DEDs). Except where otherwise stated in the below tables, all DEDs were coterminous with wards. Groups of DEDs also formed county electoral divisions (CEDs), which elected councillors to the county councils, forming an upper tier of government above the urban and rural district councils. By contrast, county boroughs were single-tier bodies, independent of the county councils. The council, whose members were elected by their DEDs, had powers of both a district council and a county council.

== Evolution and reform ==
Urban District Councils could petition for a charter of incorporation, changing the status of the urban district to that of a Borough. The following districts became boroughs in this way:

- Bangor by letters patent dated 30 December 1927, taking effect on 23 January 1928;
- Coleraine by letters patent dated 29 December 1928, taking effect on 23 January 1929;
- Newtownards by letters patent dated 8 November 1937, taking effect on 23 May 1938;
- Ballymena by letters patent dated 21 December 1937, taking effect on 23 May 1939;
- Larne by letters patent dated 15 November 1938, taking effect on 23 May 1939;
- Portadown by letters patent dated 24 July 1947, taking effect on 2 October 1947;
- Enniskillen by letters patent dated 29 April 1949, taking effect on 30 May 1949;
- Carrickfergus by letters patent dated 27 May 1949, taking effect on 1 July 1949;
- Lurgan by letters patent dated 27 May 1949, taking effect on 7 July 1949; and
- Lisburn by letters patent dated 24 March 1964, taking effect on 2 June 1964.

A small number of districts were abolished or created after 1921.

The entire system of local government in Northern Ireland was overhauled by the Local Government Act (Northern Ireland) 1972, which replaced the county boroughs, administrative counties, urban districts, and rural districts with 26 local government districts. The new system came into effect on 1 October 1973.

== County boroughs ==
| Name of county borough | District Electoral Divisions (1923) | Changes between 1921 and 1973 | Successor district(s) in 1973 |
|---|---|---|---|
| Belfast | 15 - Clifton, Court, Cromac, Dock, Duncairn, Falls, Ormeau, Pottinger, St. Anne's, St. George's, Shankill, Smithfield, Victoria, Windsor, Woodvale | | Belfast |
| Londonderry | 5 - Londonderry No. 1 Urban (North ward), Londonderry No. 2 Urban (South ward), Londonderry No. 3 Urban (East ward), Londonderry No. 4 Urban (West ward), Londonderry No. 5 Urban (Waterside ward) | | Londonderry |

== Urban and rural districts by administrative county ==
=== Administrative county of Antrim ===
| Name of district | District Electoral Divisions (1923) | Changes between 1921 and 1973 | Successor district(s) in 1973 |
|---|---|---|---|
| Antrim Rural District | 20 - Antrim Rural, Antrim Urban, Ballyclare Rural, Ballylinny, Ballynadrentagh, Ballyrobin, Cargin, Connor, Craigarogan, Cranfield, Crumlin, Donegore, Dundesert, Kilbride, Randalstown, Rashee, Seacash, Sharvogues, Shilvodan, Templepatrick | | Antrim, Ballymena, Belfast, Lisburn, Newtownabbey |
| Ballycastle Rural District | 15 - Armoy, Ballintoy, Ballycastle Rural, Croagh, Cushendall, Cushleake, Drumtullagh, Dunseverick, Glendun, Glenmakeeran, Glenshesk, Ramoan, Rathlin, Red Bay, The Fair Head | | Moyle |
| Ballycastle Urban District | 2 - Ballycastle North, Ballycastle South | | Moyle |
| Ballyclare Urban District | 1 - Ballyclare Urban | | Newtownabbey |
| Ballymena Rural District | 22 - Ahoghill, Ballyclug, Ballyconnelly, Ballyscullion, Broughshane, Clogh, Cloghogue, Drumanaway, Dundermot, Dunminning, Galgorm, Glenbuck, Glenravill, Glenwhirry, Kells, Kirkinriola, Lisnagarran, Longmore, Newtown Crommelin, Portglenone, Slemish, Toome | | Antrim, Ballymena, Ballymoney |
| Ballymena Urban District | 3 - Ballymena No. 1 Urban (Market Ward), Ballymena No. 2 Urban (Town Ward), Ballymena No. 3 Urban (Harryville Ward) | Reconstituted as a borough in 1939 | Ballymena |
| Ballymoney Rural District | 20 - Ballycregagh, Ballyhoe, Beardiville, Benvardin, Bushmills, Carnmoon, Castlequarter, Corkey, Dervock, Dirraw, Dunloy, Enagh, Killagan, Killoquin Lower, Killoquin Upper, Kilraghts, Portrush Rural, Seacon, Stranocum, The Vow | | Ballymoney, Coleraine, Moyle |
| Ballymoney Urban District | 1 - Ballymoney | | Ballymoney |
| Belfast Rural District | 6 - Ballygomartin, Ballysillan, Carnmoney, Monkstown, Whiteabbey, Whitehouse | Abolished 1 April 1958; divided between Newtownabbey UD and Antrim, Larne and Lisburn RDs | |
| Carrickfergus Urban District | 1 - Carrickfergus Urban | Reconstituted as a borough in 1949 | Carrickfergus |
| Larne Rural District | 13 - Ardclinis, Ballycor, Ballynure, Carncastle, Carrickfergus Rural, Eden, Glenarm, Glencloy, Glynn, Islandmagee, Kilwaughter, Raloo, Templecorran | | Carrickfergus, Larne, Moyle, Newtownabbey |
| Larne Urban District | 5 - Central, Curran, Gardenmore, Inver, Townparks | Reconstituted as a borough in 1939 | Larne |
| Lisburn Rural District | 14 - Aghagallon, Aghalee, Ballinderry, Ballyscolly, Derryaghy, Glenavy, Island Kelly, Knockadona, Legatirriff, Lissue, Magheragall, Magheramesk, Malone and Tullyrusk | | Belfast, Craigavon, Lisburn |
| Lisburn Urban District | 3 - Lisburn Central, Lisburn North, Lisburn South | Reconstituted as a borough in 1964 | Lisburn |
| Newtownabbey Urban District | (from 1958) 7 - Carnmoney, Cavehill, Glengormley, Jordanstown, Whiteabbey, Whitehouse, Whitewell | Created 1 April 1958 | Belfast, Newtownabbey |
| Portrush Urban District | 1 - Portrush Urban | | Coleraine |
| Whitehead Urban District | (from 1927) 1 - Whitehead Urban | Established on 1 April 1927 from part of Larne RD, by virtue of the Whitehead Urban District Order, 1926 | Carrickfergus |
| Totals as of 1923 | 127 District Electoral Divisions | | Antrim, Ballymena, Belfast, Lisburn, Newtownabbey, Carrickfergus, Coleraine, Craigavon, Moyle, Ballymoney, Larne |
| 15 districts (including 7 rural districts and 8 urban districts) | 127 District Electoral Divisions | | Antrim, Ballymena, Belfast, Lisburn, Newtownabbey, Carrickfergus, Coleraine, Craigavon, Moyle, Ballymoney, Larne |

=== County Armagh ===
| Name of district | District Electoral Divisions (1923) | Changes between 1921 and 1973 | Successor district(s) in 1973 |
|---|---|---|---|
| Armagh Rural District | 27 - Aghory, Annaghmore, Armaghbrague, Armagh Rural, Ballyards, Ballymartrun, Brootally, Charlemont, Clady, Crossmore, Derrynoose, Glenanne, Glenaul, Grange, Hamiltons Bawn, Hockley, Keady Rural, Killeen, Killyman, Kilmore, Lisnadill, Loughgall, Markethill, Middletown, Rich Hill, Tullyroan, Tynan | | Armagh, Craigavon, Dungannon |
| Armagh Urban District | 3 - Armagh East, Armagh North, Armagh South | | Armagh |
| Craigavon Urban District | (from 1967) 10 - Breagh, Brownlows Derry, Carrowbrack, Cornakinnegar, Drumcree, Kernan, Lurgan Rural, Montiaghs, Portadown Rural, Tartaraghan | Created in 1967§. All DEDs are identical to those that were in Lurgan Rural District, except for Lurgan Rural DED, part of which was added to Lurgan Urban DED in Lurgan Urban District. | Craigavon |
| Keady Urban District | 1 - Keady Urban | | Armagh |
| Lurgan Rural District | 10 - Breagh, Brownlows Derry, Carrowbrack, Cornakinnegar, Drumcree, Kernan, Lurgan Rural, Montiaghs, Portadown Rural, Tartaraghan | Abolished in 1967§ | |
| Lurgan Urban District | 1 - Lurgan Urban | Reconstituted as a borough in 1949 | Craigavon |
| Newry No. 2 Rural District | 21 - Ballybot, Ballymyre, Belleek, Camlough, Camly, Cloghoge, Creggan Lower, Crossmaglen, Cullyhanna, Dorsy, Forkhill, Jonesborough, Killevy, Lathbirget, Lisleitrim, Mountnorris, Moybane, Mullaghglass, Newtownhamilton, Poyntz Pass, Tullyhappy | | Armagh, Newry and Mourne |
| Portadown Urban District | 3 - Portadown North, Portadown South East, Portadown South West | Reconstituted as a borough in 1947 | Craigavon |
| Tanderagee Rural District | 4 - Ballysheil, Mullaghbrack, Mullahead, Tanderagee Rural | | Armagh, Craigavon |
| Tanderagee Urban District | 1 - Tanderagee Urban | | Armagh |
| Totals as of 1923 | 71 District Electoral Divisions | | Armagh, Newry and Mourne, Craigavon, Dungannon |
| 9 districts (including 4 rural districts and 5 urban districts) | 71 District Electoral Divisions | | Armagh, Newry and Mourne, Craigavon, Dungannon |

§ Lurgan Rural District was abolished on 1 April 1967, and a small part transferred to Lurgan Borough. The rest was assigned to the new Craigavon Urban District, but Craigavon Development Commission rather than Lurgan Rural District Council became Craigavon Urban District Council.

=== Administrative county of Down ===
| Name of district | District Electoral Divisions (1923) | Changes between 1921 and 1973 | Successor district(s) in 1973 |
|---|---|---|---|
| Banbridge Rural District | 20 - Annaclone, Ardtanagh, Balloolymore, Ballybrick, Ballyward, Banbridge Rural, Crossgar, Dromore Rural, Garvaghy, Gilford, Glaskermore, Leitrim, Loughbrickland, Magherally, Moneyslane, Quilly, Scarva, Skeagh, Tirkelly, Tullylish | | Banbridge |
| Banbridge Urban District | 2 - Banbridge East Urban, Banbridge West Urban | | Banbridge |
| Bangor Urban District | 5 - Ballyholme, Castle, Clifton, Dufferin, Princetown | Reconstituted as a borough in 1928 | North Down |
| Castlereagh Rural District | 4 - Ballyhackamore, Castlereagh, Dundonald, Holywood Rural | | Belfast, Castlereagh, North Down |
| Donaghadee Urban District | 1 - Donaghadee Urban | | Ards |
| Downpatrick Urban District | (from 1925) 1 - Downpatrick Urban | Created in 1925 from part of Downpatrick RD, by virtue of the Downpatrick Urban District Order, 1924 | Down |
| Dromore Urban District | 1 - Dromore Urban | | Banbridge |
| East Down Rural District | 25 - Ardglass, Ardkeen, Ballynahinch, Castlewellan, Clough, Crossgar, Downpatrick Rural, Downpatrick Urban, Dundrum, Dunmore, Dunsfort, Hollymount, Inch, Killinchy, Killough, Killyleagh, Kilmore, Leggygowan, Portaferry, Quintin, Raholp, Rossconor, Seaforde, Strangford, Tyrells | Known as Downpatrick Rural District before 1 January 1962 | Ards, Down |
| Hillsborough Rural District | 15 - Annahilt, Ballykeel, Ballymacbrennan, Ballyworfy, Blaris, Breda, Dromara, Drumbeg, Drumbo, Glasdrumman, Hillsborough, Killaney, Maze, Ouley, Saintfield | | Banbridge, Belfast, Castlereagh, Down, Lisburn |
| Holywood Urban District | 1 - Holywood Urban | | North Down |
| Kilkeel Urban District | (from 1937) 1 - Kilkeel Urban | Created in 1937 from part of Kilkeel Rural District, by virtue of the Kilkeel Urban District Order, 1936 | Newry and Mourne |
| Moira Rural District | 7 - Ballyleny, Donaghcloney, Kilmore, Magheralin, Moira, Tullylish, Waringstown | | Banbridge, Craigavon, Lisburn |
| Newcastle Urban District | 1 - Newcastle Urban (divided into two wards, North and South) | | Down |
| Newry Urban District | 3 - Newry North Urban, Newry South Urban, Newry West Urban | | Newry and Mourne |
| Newry No. 1 Rural District | 11 - Clonallan Upper, Clonduff, Crobane, Donaghmore, Drumgalt, Glen, Hilltown, Newry Rural, Ouley, Rathfriland, Warrenpoint | | Banbridge, Newry and Mourne |
| Newtownards Urban District | 5 - Castle, Central, Glen, Scrabo, Victoria | Reconstituted as a borough in 1938 | Ards |
| North Down Rural District (offices in Newtownards) | 16 - Ballygowan, Ballyhalbert, Ballymeglaff, Ballywalter, Bangor Rural, Carrowdore, Comber, Donaghadee Rural, Grey Abbey, Kilmood, Kircubbin, Moneyreagh, Mount Stewart, Newtownards North, Newtownards South, Tullynakill | Known as Newtownards Rural District before 1 August 1954 | Ards, Castlereagh, Down, North Down |
| South Down Rural District (offices in Kilkeel) | 10 - Ballykeel, Bryansford, Fofanny, Greencastle, Kilkeel, Killowen, Maghera, Mourne Park, Mullartown, Rosstrevor | Known as Kilkeel Rural District before 4 July 1966 | Down, Newry and Mourne |
| Warrenpoint Urban District | 2 - Warrenpoint East, Warrenpoint West | | Newry and Mourne |
| Totals as of 1923 | 129 District Electoral Divisions | | Newry and Mourne, Down, Ards, Castlereagh, North Down, Banbridge, Lisburn |
| 17 districts (including 7 rural districts and 10 urban districts) | 129 District Electoral Divisions | | Newry and Mourne, Down, Ards, Castlereagh, North Down, Banbridge, Lisburn |

=== County Fermanagh ===
| Name of district | District Electoral Divisions (1923) | Changes between 1921 and 1973 | Successor district(s) in 1973 |
|---|---|---|---|
| Enniskillen Urban District | 3 - Enniskillen East, Enniskillen North, Enniskillen South | Reconstituted as a borough in 1949; abolished in 1967† | Fermanagh |
| Enniskillen Rural District | 33 - Aghanaglack, Ballycassidy, Ballydoolagh, Ballyreagh, Castlecoole, Clabby, Coolyermer, Cuilcagh, Derrybrusk, Derrylester, Doagh, Drumane, Ely, Enniskillen Rural, Florence Court, Gardenhill, Glenkeel, Gortahurk, Holywell, Imeroo, Inishmore, Killesher, Kinawley, Kinglass, Laragh, Lisbellaw, Lisbofin, Monea, Newporton, Old Barr, Rashalton, Ross, Tempo | Abolished in 1967† | Fermanagh |
| Irvinestown Rural District | 23 - Bellanamallard, Belleek, Brookhill, Castlecaldwell, Church Hill, Clonelly, Drumkeeran, Drumrush, Ederny, Garrison, Glenvannan, Inishmacsaint, Irvinestown, Kesh, Killadeas (Rockfield), Lack, Lattone, Lisnarrick, Magheraculmoney, Mallybreen, Milltown, Roogagh, Tirmacspird | Abolished in 1967† | Fermanagh |
| Lisnaskea Rural District | 30 - Aghakillyrnaud, Aghyoule, Armagh Manor, Belle Isle, Brookeborough, Carnmore, Carrickmacosker, Clonkeelon, Coolnamarrow, Corralongford, Cross, Crum, Deerpark, Derrylea, Derrysteaton, Doon, Dresternan, Drummully, Greenhill, Grogey, Kilmore, Kilturk, Lisnaskea, Magheraveeley, Maguiresbridge, Mullaghfad, Mullnagowan, Newtown Butler, Rosslea, Springtown | Abolished in 1967† | Fermanagh |
| Totals as of 1923 | 89 District Electoral Divisions | | Fermanagh |
| 4 districts (including 3 rural districts and 1 urban district) | 89 District Electoral Divisions | | Fermanagh |

† All district councils in Fermanagh were abolished in 1968, merging with Fermanagh County Council to create a unitary county council.

=== Administrative county of Londonderry ===
| Name of district | District Electoral Divisions (1923) | Changes between 1921 and 1973 | Successor district(s) in 1973 |
|---|---|---|---|
| Coleraine Rural District | 20 - Aghadowey, Agivey, Articlave, Ballylagan, Bannbrook, Bovagh, Downhill, Drumcroon, Garvagh, Glenkeen, Hervey Hill, Kilrea, Knockantern, Letterloan, Portstewart, Ringsend, Slaght, Somerset, Tamlaght, The Grove | | Coleraine, Magherafelt |
| Coleraine Urban District | 1 - Coleraine | Reconstituted as a borough in 1929 | Coleraine |
| Limavady Rural District | 18 - Aghanllcio, Ballykelly, Bellarena, Benone, Druna, Dungiven, Faughanvale, Feeny, Fore Glen, Fruithill, Gelvin, Glenshane, Keady, Lislane, Myroe, Owenreagh, Straw, The Highland | | Limavady |
| Limavady Urban District | 1 - Limavady | | Limavady, Londonderry† |
| Londonderry Rural District | 12 - Ardmore, Ballymullins, Banagher, Bondsglen, Claudy, Eglinton, Glendermot, Liberties Lower, Liberties Upper, Lough Enagh, Tamnaherin, Waterside | Reconstituted as an Urban District in 1969‡ | Londonderry† |
| Magherafelt Rural District | 25 - Ballymoghan, Ballyronan, Bancran, Bellaghy, Brackagh, Slievegallion, Carnamoney, Castle Dawson, Clady, Desertmartin, Draperstown, Gulladuff, Iniscarn, Lissan Upper, Maghera, Magherafelt, Moneyhaw, Moneymore, Rocktown, Salterstown, Sprmghill, Swatragh, The Loop, The Six Towns, Tobermore, Tullykeeran | | Cookstown, Magherafelt |
| Portstewart Urban District | 1 - Portstewart Urban | | Coleraine |
| Totals as of 1923 | 78 District Electoral Divisions | | Cookstown, Magherafelt, Coleraine, Limavady, Londonderry |
| 7 districts (including 4 rural districts and 3 urban district) | 78 District Electoral Divisions | | Cookstown, Magherafelt, Coleraine, Limavady, Londonderry |

† The district is now known as Derry.

‡ In 1969 Londonderry Rural District was redesignated as Londonderry Urban District, its council was abolished, and its municipal governance transferred to the Londonderry Development Commission, which had also replaced the corporation of Londonderry County Borough (which the rural district surrounded).

=== County Tyrone ===
| Name of district | District Electoral Divisions (1923) | Changes between 1921 and 1973 | Successor district(s) in 1973 |
|---|---|---|---|
| Castlederg Rural District | 14 - Bomackatall, Castlebane, Castlederg, Clare, Clunahill, Corgary, Drumquin, Killen, Killeter, Lisnacloon, Listymore, Magheracreggan, Magheranageeragh, West Longfield | | Omagh, Strabane |
| Clogher Rural District | 16 - Aghintain, Augher, Aughnacloy Rural, Aughnacloy Urban, Ballagh, Ballygawley, Cecil, Clogher, Cole, Cullamore, Errigal, Favor Royal, Fivemiletown, Foremass, Killyfaddy, Tullyvar | | Dungannon, Omagh |
| Cookstown Rural District | 16 - Ballyclog, Ballynasollus, Beaghmore, Coagh, Cookstown Rural, Killeenaa, Killycolpy, Lissan Lower, Munterevlin, Oaklands, Oritor, Pomeroy, Stewartstown, The Rock, The Sandholes, Tullaghoge | | Cookstown |
| Cookstown Urban District | 1 - Cookstown Urban | | Cookstown |
| Dungannon Rural District | 19 - Aghnahoe, Altmore, Ballymagran, Benburb, Bernagh, Brantry, Caledon, Castlecaulfield, Clonaneese, Clonavaddy, Crossdernot, Derrygortrevy, Donaghmore, Drumaspil, Meenagh, Minterburn, Mountjoy, Moy, Tullyniskane | | Dungannon |
| Dungannon Urban District | 3 - Dungannon Central, Dungannon East, Dungannon West | | Dungannon |
| Omagh Rural District | 43 - Aghenreie, Beragh, Camderry, Camowen, Carrickmore, Carryglass, Clanabogan, Creggan, Crockanboy, Derrybard, Dervaghroy, Draughton, Dromore, Drumnakilly, Drumquin, Dunbreen, Fallagh, Fallaghearn, Fintona, Glenlark, Gortgranagh, Gortin, Greenan, Killyclogher, Lisnacreaght, Loughmacvory, Loughmuck, Mountfield, Mountjoy Forrest East, Mountjoy Forrest West, Moyle, Mullagharn, Mullaghslin, Omagh Rural, Seskinove, Six Mile Cross, Tattymoyle, Trinamadan, Tullyclunagh, Drumharvey, Kilskeery, Moorfield, Trillick | | Fermanagh, Omagh, Strabane |
| Omagh Urban District | 3 - Omagh North, Omagh South, Omagh West | | Omagh |
| Strabane Rural District | 20 - Altaclady, Ballymagorry, Ballyneaner, Baronscourt, Camus, Churchlands, Douglasburn, Dunnalong, Dunnamanagh, Glenchiel, Glenmornan, Glenroam, Lislea, Loughash, Mountcastle, Mount Hamilton, Newtown Stewart, Plumb Bridge, Stranagalwilly, Umey East | | Strabane |
| Strabane Urban District | 4 - Strabane East Urban, Strabane North Urban, Strabane South Urban, Strabane West Urban | | Strabane |
| Totals as of 1923 | 139 District Electoral Divisions | | Fermanagh, Omagh, Strabane, Dungannon, Cookstown |
| 10 districts (including 6 rural districts and 4 urban district) | 139 District Electoral Divisions | | Fermanagh, Omagh, Strabane, Dungannon, Cookstown |

== Sources ==
- Local Government (Boundaries) Act (Northern Ireland) 1971 (Eliz II 19 & 20 c.9).
- Local Government Act (Northern Ireland) 1972 (Eliz II 20 & 21 c.9).
- Local Government (Boundaries) Order (Northern Ireland) 1972 (S.R. & O. 1972, No. 131).
