= Kells railway station (Northern Ireland) =

Railway station in County Antrim, Northern Ireland

Coordinates: 54.812655°N 6.217721°W

Kells
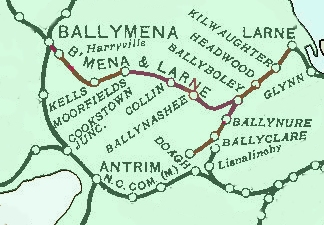
- The line in 1906

General information
- Location: County Antrim; Northern Ireland

Other information
- Status: Disused

History
- Original company: Ballymena and Larne Railway
- Pre-grouping: Ballymena and Larne Railway
- Post-grouping: Ballymena and Larne Railway

Key dates
- 24 August 1880: Station opens
- 31 January 1933: Station closes to passengers
- 3 June 1940: Station closes
Location

Kells railway station was on the Ballymena and Larne Railway which ran from Ballymena to Larne in Northern Ireland.

== History ==
The station was opened by the Ballymena and Larne Railway on 24 August 1880. It was taken over by the Belfast and Northern Counties Railway in July 1889. This was in turn taken over by the Northern Counties Committee in 1906.

The station closed to passengers on 31 January 1933 and later completely on 6 June 1940.

== Routes ==
Preceding station	Historical railways	Following station
Ballymena Harryville	Ballymena and Larne Railway; Ballymena Harryville-Larne 1878-1916	Moorfields
Ballymena	Ballymena and Larne Railway; Ballymena-Larne 1880-1933	Moorfields
