= Larne railway station =

Larne railway station may refer to:

- Larne Harbour railway station
- Larne Town railway station
