= Ballyclare Town Hall =

Municipal building in County Antrim, Northern Ireland

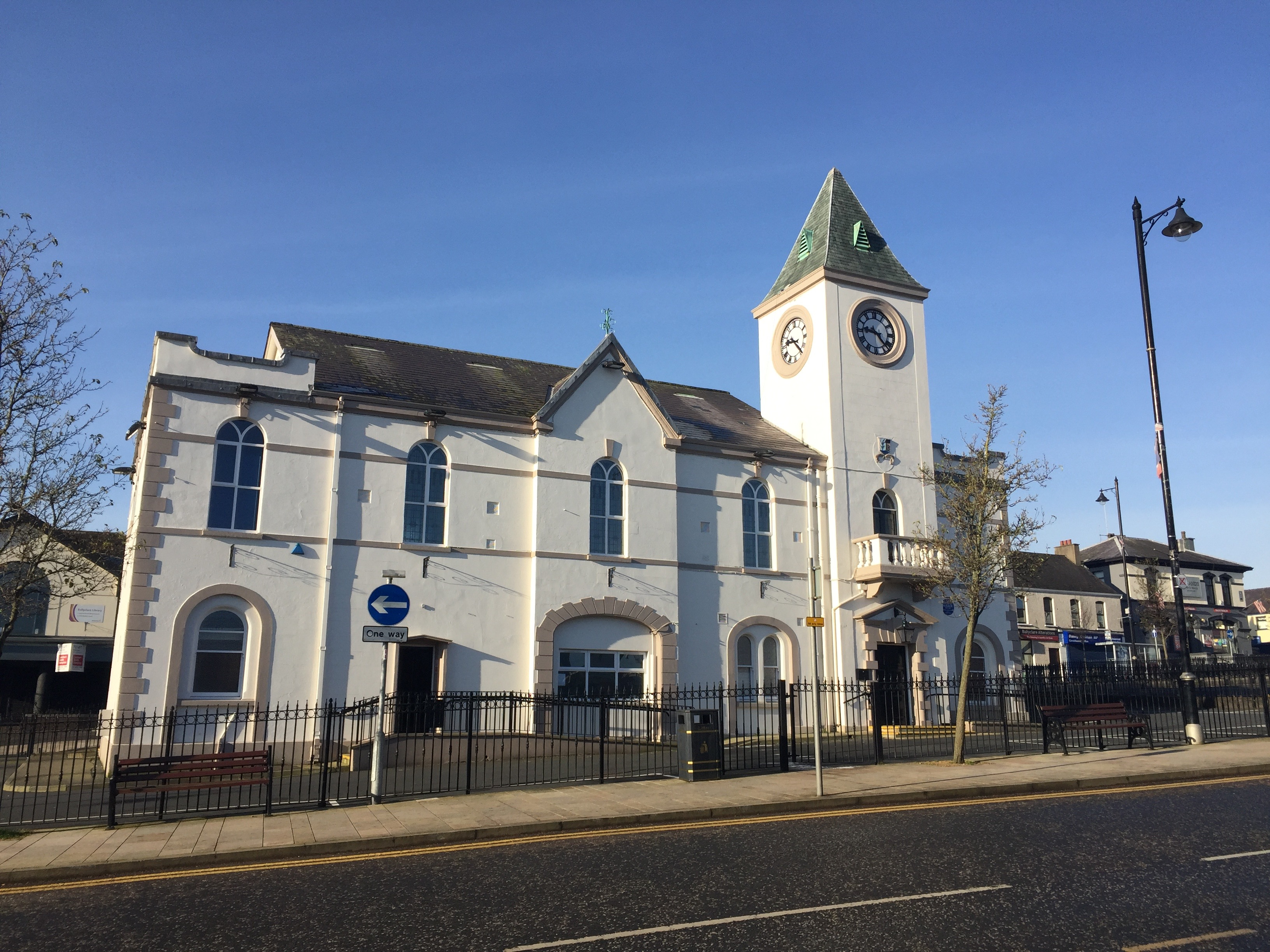
- Ballyclare Town Hall

- Shown in Northern Ireland
- 54.7522°N 6.0013°W
- Location: The Square, Ballyclare

History
- Built: 1855

Site notes
- Architectural style: Neoclassical style

Listed Building – Grade B2
- Official name: Ballyclare Town Hall, Market Square, Ballyclare
- Designated: 4 March 2010
- Reference no.: HB 21/05/004

Ballyclare Town Hall is a municipal structure in The Square, Ballyclare, County Antrim, Northern Ireland. The structure, which is primarily used as an events venue, is a Grade B2 listed building.

== History ==
In the mid-19th century, the Lord Lieutenant of Antrim, the Marquess of Donegall, donated a site, which had previously been used as a rubbish dump, for the purpose of erecting a market hall. A single-storey wooden structure, which was financed by public subscription, was erected on the site in 1855, and an upper floor was constructed to create a forum for public meetings in 1873. The design involved a symmetrical main frontage with three bays facing onto the northeast side of The Square; the central bay, which slightly projected forward and was gabled, featured a wide archway on the ground floor and a round headed window on the first floor; the outer bays were fenestrated by mullioned windows on the ground floor and a round headed window on the first floor.

After the area was advanced to the status of an urban district in 1899, the council leaders decided to take ownership of the building and to enlarge it. The enlarged structure was designed in the neoclassical style, built by W. H. and R. J. Beggs with a stucco finish and was officially opened by the Lord Lieutenant of Belfast, Sir Thomas Dixon, on 23 October 1935. The design involved an additional castellated bay on the left, an additional bay containing a three-stage tower on the right and another additional castellated bay beyond that. The tower, which slightly projected forward and was 18.3 metres (60 ft) high, contained a doorway flanked by banded pilasters supporting an entablature and a pediment in the first stage, a stone balcony supported by brackets with a French door in the second stage and a clock tower with a pyramid-shaped roof in the third stage. Internally, the principal rooms were the new council chamber for the urban district council on the ground floor and the main hall, which had a sprung dance floor, on the first floor.

The building continued to serve as the meeting place of the urban district council for much of the 20th century, but ceased to be the local seat of government after the enlarged Newtownabbey Borough Council was formed in 1973. The town hall continued to be used as an events venue for concerts and theatrical performances, and one of the rooms was fitted out for use as a cinema. The buildings also became an approved venue for wedding and civil partnership ceremonies.

A plaque to commemorate the life of the locally-born Irish novelist, Archibald McIlroy, was installed on the wall of the town hall in October 2011.
