= Larne Town railway station =

Railway station in Northern Ireland

Larne Town
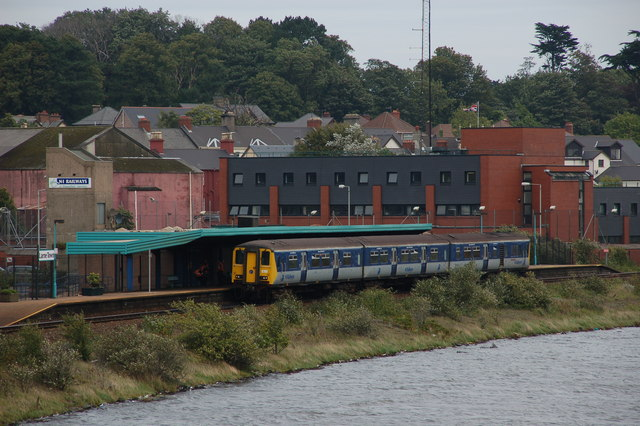
- NIR Class 450 train at Larne Town station in 2006

General information
- Location: Circular Road, Larne; Northern Ireland
- Coordinates: 54°51′01″N 5°48′51″W
- Owner: NI Railways
- Operator: NI Railways
- Line: Larne
- Platforms: 1
- Tracks: 1

Construction
- Structure type: At-grade

Other information
- Station code: LN

Key dates
- 1862: Original station opened
- 1877: B&LR station opened
- 1933: B&LR passenger traffic stopped
- 1950: B&LR station closed
- 1965: Goods traffic stopped
- 1974: Original station closed
- 1974: Current station opened on new alignment

Passengers
- 2022/23: 163,531
- 2023/24: ▲208,562
- 2024/25: ▲213,162
- 2025/26: ▲239,828
- NI Railways; Translink; NI railway stations
Route map
(Click to expand)
Location
- Location within Northern Ireland Location within island of Ireland

Larne Town railway station serves Larne in County Antrim, Northern Ireland. This station opened in 1974, and is one of two stations in the town, the other being Larne Harbour. It is the penultimate stop on the Belfast-Larne railway line.

== History ==
The original station (signposted solely as "Larne") was sited further west than the current station, on land between Circular Road and Larne Lough by the mouth of the Inver River. This station was a larger affair than the current station, with a through platform, bay platform, signalbox and goods yard, and was opened in on 1 October 1862 by the Carrickfergus & Larne Railway.

A small station was also constructed slightly further north by the Ballymena & Larne Railway on (appropriately) Narrow Gauge Road. Although the narrow-gauge B&LR had a link to allow running to Larne Harbour, there was no direct connection to the Irish-gauge C&LR Larne station. Passenger services on the B&LR line ceased in 1933, and the line was closed altogether in 1950. The site of the B&LR station is now buried under the A8 dual carriageway.

In the 1970s, road improvement plans necessitated the closure and re-siting of Larne station. A new track alignment was constructed on reclaimed land further out into Larne Lough, diverging from the original C&LR alignment at a point southeast of the original Larne station, and moving back onto the existing Harbour line at what is now Glynnview Avenue. Larne Town was then constructed as a single-platform station on this new alignment with a small ticket office, opening in June 1974 - the suffix "Town" being added at this time to help distinguish it from Larne Harbour station. The original Larne station was demolished soon after, and no traces of the original station remain today - the old Circular Road site and the original track alignment are now occupied by various retail units and the local bus station.

== Service ==
Mondays to Saturdays there is an hourly service towards Larne Harbour or Belfast Grand Central with extra services at peak times. Some of those peak services start and terminate here rather than Larne Harbour.

On Sundays there is a service every two hours in either direction to Larne Harbour or Belfast Grand Central .

Preceding station	NI Railways	Following station
Glynn	Northern Ireland Railways; Belfast-Larne	Larne Harbour
	Historical railways	
Glynn; Line and station open	Northern Counties Committee; Belfast-Larne	Larne Harbour; Line and station open
Kilwaughter; Line and station closed	Ballymena and Larne Railway; Ballymena-Larne	Larne Harbour; Line closed, station open.

== Gallery ==
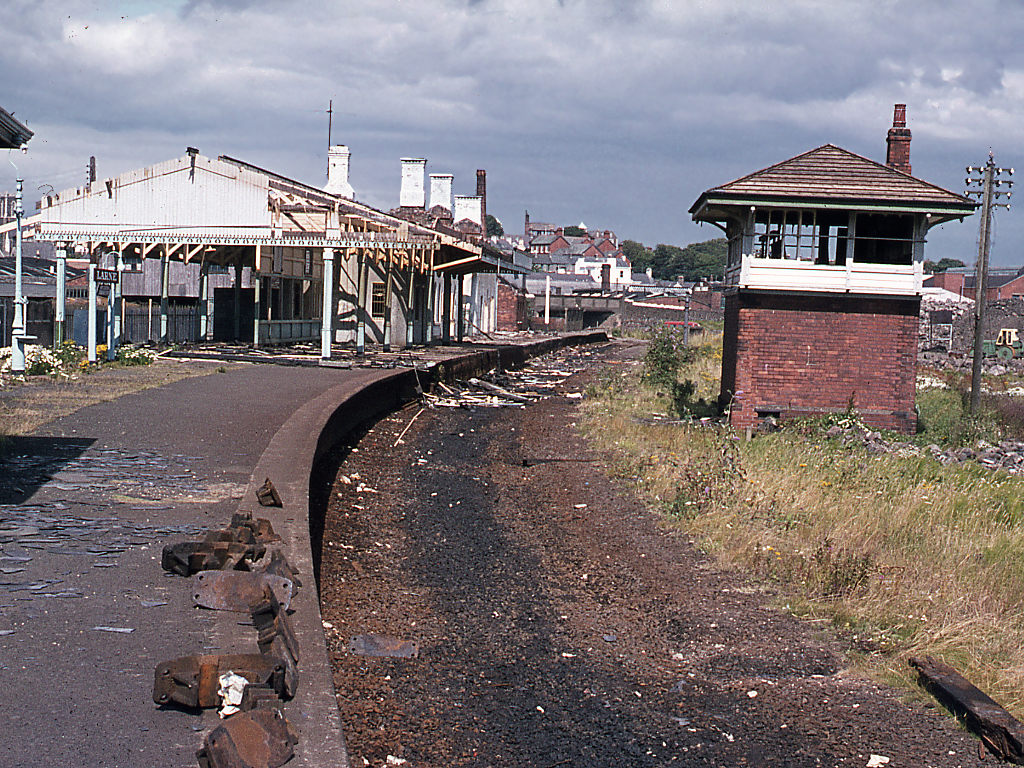
The original Larne station during demolition in 1974.

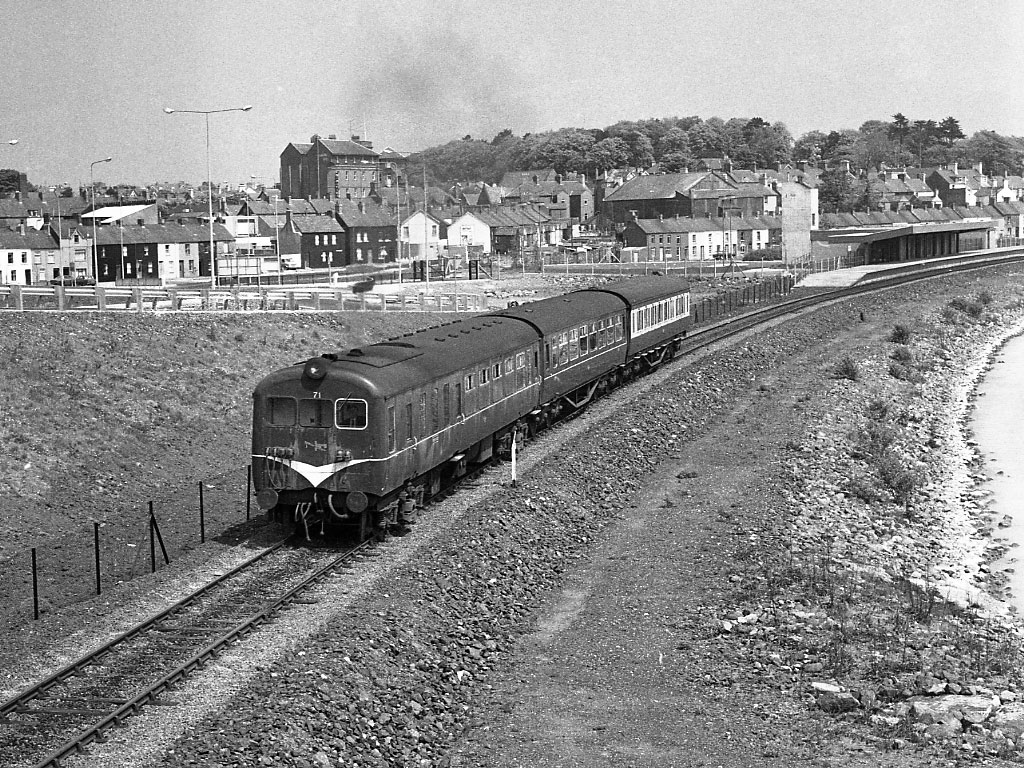
UTA 70 Class train leaving Larne Town in 1977.

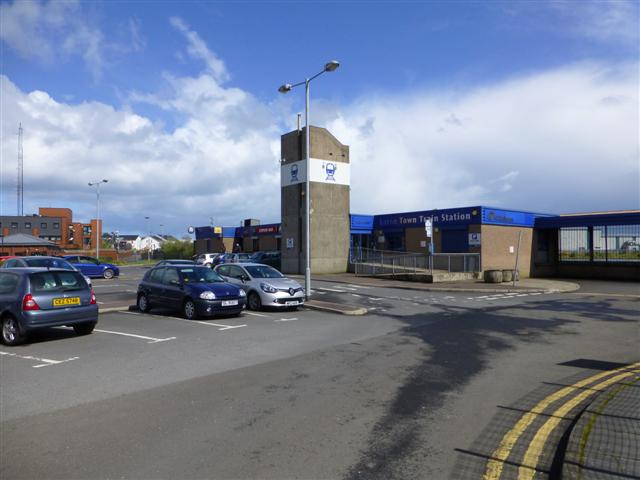
Larne Town station in 2013.
