= List of Irish local government areas 1899–1921 =

The system of local government Ireland, then wholly within the United Kingdom of Great Britain and Ireland, was reformed by the Local Government (Ireland) Act 1898, which came into force in 1899. The new system divided Ireland into the following entities:

At the county level:

- 33 (Note: Tipperary (North Riding) and Tipperary (South Riding) were separate counties during this period) Administrative counties; and
- 6 County boroughs

Within the administrative counties:

- Municipal boroughs, governed by the Municipal Corporations (Ireland) Act 1840;
- Urban districts; and
- Rural districts

Some counties contained rural districts only, with no municipal boroughs or urban districts.

A number of small towns located in rural districts also had town commissioners with limited powers under the Towns Improvement (Ireland) Act 1854.

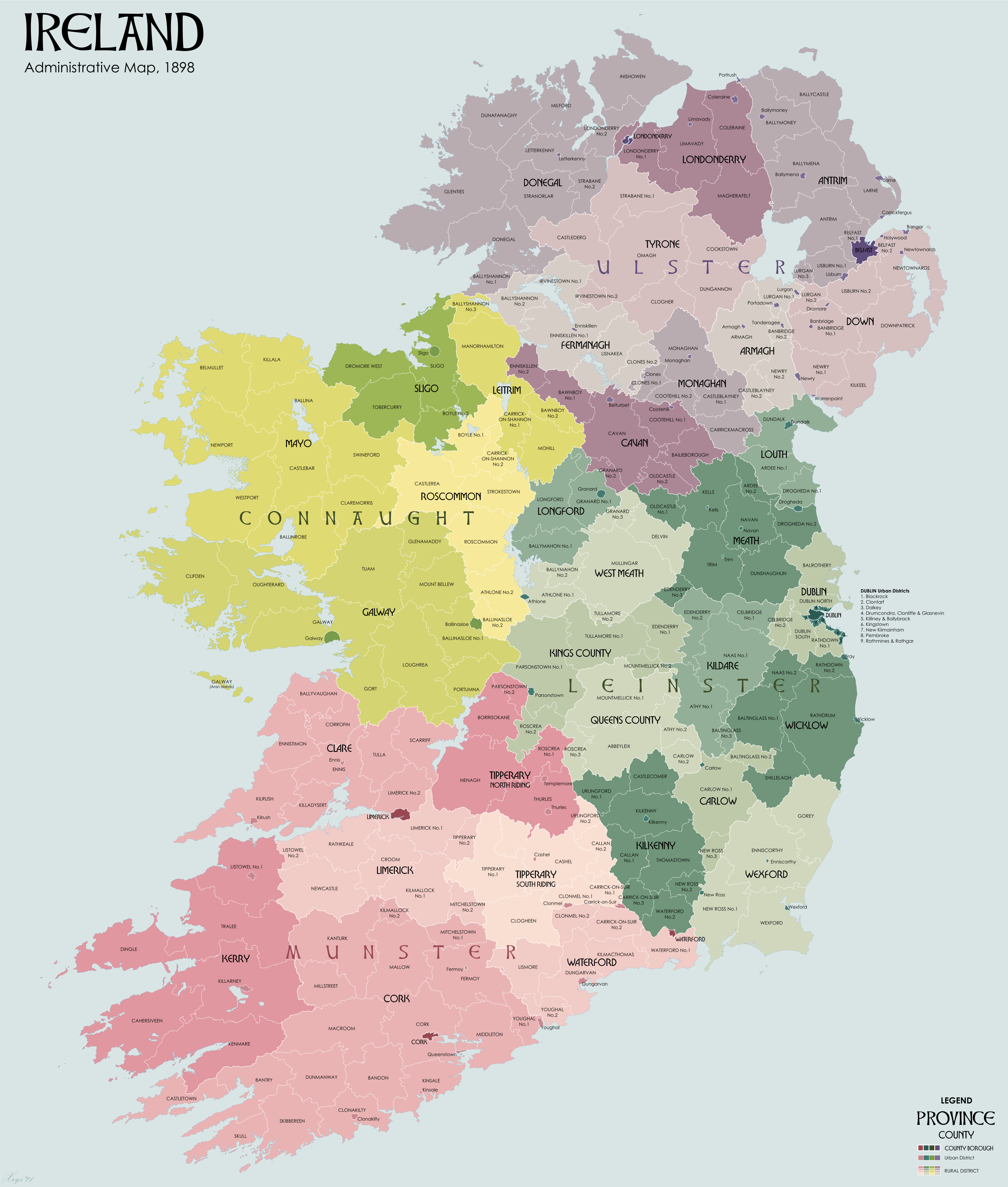
Map of Local Government Areas in 1898

== County boroughs ==
County borough	Electoral areas	Notes
Belfast	Cromac, Duncairn, Falls, Ormeau, Pottinger, St. Anne's, Shankill, Victoria, and Woodvale	
Cork	Centre, North-East, North-West No. 1, North-West No. 2, North-West No. 3, South No. 1, and South No. 2	
Dublin	Dublin No. 1, Dublin No. 2, Dublin No. 3, Dublin No. 4, Dublin No. 5, Dublin No. 6, Dublin No. 7, Dublin No. 8, Dublin No. 9, and Dublin No. 10	Absorbed three urban districts in County Dublin 1900
Limerick	Limerick No. 1, Limerick No. 2, Limerick No. 3, Limerick No. 4, and Limerick No. 5	
Londonderry	East and South, North, Waterside, and West	Commonly called Derry
Waterford	Waterford No. 1, Waterford No. 2, Waterford No. 3, Waterford No. 4, and Waterford No. 5	

== County Antrim ==
Urban district	Electoral areas	Notes
Ballycastle		Established as an Urban District on 1 April 1921 from part of Ballycastle RD
Ballyclare		Established as an Urban District on 1 October 1905
Ballymena	Harryville, Market, and Town Hall	
Ballymoney	Ballymoney North Urban, and Ballymoney South Urban	
Carrickfergus	Carrickfergus Central Urban, Carrickfergus East Urban, and Carrickfergus West Urban	
Larne	Central, Curran, Gardenmore, and Townparks [sic]	
Lisburn	Lisburn Central Urban, Lisburn North Urban, and Lisburn South East [sic] Urban	
Portrush	Portrush East Urban, Portrush North Urban, and Portrush West Urban	
Rural district	Electoral areas	Notes
Aghalee		Briefly known as Lurgan No. 3 Rural District, renamed in 1899.
Antrim	Antrim, Ballyclare Rural, Crumlin, Randalstown, and Templepatrick	
Ballycastle	Ballintoy, Ballycastle, and Cushendall	
Ballymena	Broughshane, Clogh, Galgorm, Kells, and Portglenone	
Ballymoney	Bushmills, Castle Quarter, Dervock, Enagh, and Killoquin	
Belfast	Belfast Rural (sole electoral area)	Originally known as Belfast No. 1 Rural District; renamed in January 1901.
Larne	Carrickfergus Rural, Island Magee, and Kilwaughter	
Lisburn	Aghalee, Glenavy, Knocknadona, and Malone	Briefly known as Lisburn No. 1 Rural District, renamed by March 1900 following renaming of Lisburn No.2 Rural District.

== County Armagh ==
Urban district	Electoral areas	Notes
Armagh	Armagh East Urban, Armagh North Urban, and Armagh South Urban	
Keady	Keady Urban (sole electoral area)	Constituted Urban District 1903
Lurgan	Lurgan North Urban, Lurgan South East Urban, and Lurgan South West Urban	
Portadown	Portadown North Urban, Portadown South East Urban, and Portadown South West Urban	
Tanderagee	Tanderagee Urban (sole electoral area)	
Rural district	Electoral areas	Notes
Armagh	Armagh Rural, Keady Rural, Loughgall, Markethill, and Tynan	
Crossmaglen	Crossmaglen, and Newtown Hamilton	Originally known as Castleblayney No. 2 Rural District; renamed in June 1899 incorporated into Newry No. 2 Rural District on 1 April 1921
Lurgan	Lurgan Rural, Portadown Rural, and Tartaraghan	Originally known as Lurgan No. 1 Rural District; renamed by 1902
Newry No. 2	Camlough, and Poyntz Pass	
Tandragee	Tanderagee Rural (sole electoral area)	Briefly known as Banbridge No. 2 Rural District; renamed Tandragee Rural District in June 1899, sometimes spelt Tanderagee.

== County Carlow ==
Urban district	Electoral areas	Notes
Carlow	Carlow North Urban, Carlow South Urban, and Graiguecullen	
Rural district	Electoral areas	Notes
Baltinglass No. 2	Hacketstown, and Rathvilly	
Carlow	Bagenalstown, Borris, Carlow Rural, Clonegall, Fennagh & Myshall, Leighlinbridge, and Tullow	Originally known as Carlow No. 1 Rural District; renamed by 1912
Idrone	Idrone Rural (sole electoral area)	Originally known as New Ross No. 3 Rural District; renamed 1899

== County Cavan ==
Urban district	Electoral areas	Notes
Belturbet	Belturbet Urban (sole electoral area)	
Cavan	Cavan East Urban, Cavan North West Urban, and Cavan South West [sic]	Created in 1900
Cootehill	Cootehill Urban (sole electoral area)	
Rural district	Electoral areas	Notes
Bailieborough	Bailieborough, Crossbane, and Kingscourt	
Bawnboy	Bawnboy, and Swanlinbar	Originally known as Bawnboy No. 1 Rural District; renamed by 1902
Castlerahan	Castlerahan (sole electoral area)	Originally known as Oldcastle No. 2 Rural District; renamed in 1903.
Cavan	Arvagh, Ballyhaise, Bellananagh, Cavan Rural, Cootehill Rural, Drumcarn, Killeshandra, Kilnaleck, Larah, and Stradone	Absorbed Cootehill No.1 Rural District 1 April 1917
Cootehill No. 1		Absorbed into Cavan Rural District 1 April 1917.
Enniskillen No. 2	Enniskillen No. 2 Rural (sole electoral area)	
Mullaghoran	Mullaghoran Rural (sole electoral area)	Originally known as Granard No. 2 Rural District; renamed between 1902 and 1912

== County Clare ==
Urban district	Electoral areas	Notes
Ennis	Ennis North East Urban, and Ennis South West Urban	
Kilrush	Kilrush East Urban, and Kilrush West Urban	
Rural district	Electoral areas	Notes
Ballyvaghan	Drumcreehy, and Lisdoonvarna	
Corrofin	Corrofin, and Muckanagh	
Ennis	Ennis Rural, Killanniv, Newmarket, and Templemaley	
Ennistymon	Ennistymon, Killilagh, Magherareagh, and Miltown Malbay	
Killadysert	Coolmeen, and Killadysert	
Kilrush	Doonbeg, Kilkee, Kilmihil, Kilrush Rural, Moyarta, and Mullagh	
Limerick No. 2	Mountievers, and O'Briensbridge	
Scariff	Feakle, Killaloe, and Scariff	
Tulla	Caher, Kilkishen, Quinn, and Tulla	

== County Cork ==
Urban district	Electoral areas	Notes
Clonakilty	Clonakilty Urban (sole electoral area)	
Fermoy	Fermoy Central Urban, Fermoy North Urban, and Fermoy South Urban	
Kinsale	Kinsale North Urban, and Kinsale South Urban	
Macroom	Macroom Urban (sole electoral area)	Created in 1901 from part of Macroom Rural District
Mallow	Mallow East Urban, Mallow North West Urban, and Mallow South [sic] Urban	Constituted Urban District 1902
Midleton	Midleton Urban (sole electoral area)	Created in 1900
Passage West		Created in 1921 from part of Cork Rural District, by virtue of an Order made by the Local Government Board for Ireland on 28 June 1921
Queenstown	Queenstown East Urban, and Queenstown West Urban	
Skibbereen	Skibbereen Urban (sole electoral area)	Created in 1900
Youghal	Youghal Central Urban, Youghal North Urban, and Youghal South Urban	
Rural district	Electoral areas	Notes
Bandon	Ballymodan, Bandon, Inishannon, Kilbrittain, Teadies, and Templemartin	
Bantry	Bantry, Bantry Rural, Durrus, and Glengarriff	
Castletown	Castletown Rural (sole electoral area)	
Charleville	Charleville (sole electoral area)	Originally known as Kilmallock No. 2 Rural District; renamed by 1902
Clonakilty	Clonakilty Rural, Rosscarbery, and Timoleague	
Cork	Ballincollig, Bishopstown, Blackrock, Blarney, Queenstown Rural, and Whitechurch	
Dunmanway	Carrigboy, Coolmountain, Dunmanway, and Kinneigh	
Fermoy	Ballyhooly, Ballynoe, Fermoy Rural, Kilworth, and Rathcormack	
Kanturk	Banteer, Boherboy, Kanturk, Knockatooan, Milford, and Newmarket	
Kinsale	Ballinspittle, Ballymartle, Carrigaline, and Kinsale Rural	
Macroom	Clonmoyle, Inchigeelagh, Macloneigh, Rahalisk, and Slievereagh	
Mallow	Buttevant, Doneraile, Kilshannig, and Mallow Rural	
Midleton	Cloyne, Lisgoold, and Midleton Rural	
Millstreet	Cullen, and Drishane	
Mitchelstown No. 1	Kildorrery, and Mitchelstown	
Skibbereen	Aghadown, Castlehaven, Clonkeen, Dromdaleague, and Skibbereen Rural	
Skull	Goleen, and Skull	
Youghal No. 1	Youghal No. 1 Rural (sole electoral area)	

== County Donegal ==
Urban district	Electoral areas	Notes
Buncrana	Buncrana North Urban, and Buncrana South Urban	Created in 1913 from part of Inishowen Rural District
Bundoran	Bundoran North Urban, and Bundoran South Urban	Created in 1914 from part of Ballyshannon Rural District
Letterkenny	Letterkenny Urban (sole electoral area)	
Rural district	Electoral areas	Notes
Ballyshannon	Ballyshannon Rural (sole electoral area)	Originally known as Ballyshannon No. 1 Rural District; renamed March 1902
Donegal	Donegal, Dunkineely, Laghy, and Mountcharles	
Dunfanaghy	Dunfanaghy, and Gortahork	
Glenties	Annagarry, Ardara, Dunglow, Glencolumbkille, Glenties, and Killybegs	
Inishowen	Buncrana Rural, Carndonagh, Malin, and Moville	
Letterkenny	Letterkenny Rural, and Temple Douglas	
Londonderry No. 2	Londonderry No. 2 Rural (sole electoral area)	Absorbed into Inishowen Rural District in 1922
Milford	Carrickart, Fanad, Milford, and Rathmullan	
Strabane No. 2	Castlefinn, and Raphoe	Absorbed into Stranorlar Rural District in 1923
Stranorlar	Cloghan, and Stranorlar	Absorbed Strabane No.2 Rural District in 1923

== County Down ==
Area	Electoral area	Notes
Banbridge	Banbridge East Urban, Banbridge North West Urban, and Banbridge South West Urban	
Bangor	Castle, Clifton, and Dufferin	
Donaghadee	Donaghadee North Urban, and Donaghadee South Urban	Established as an Urban District on 1 January 1906
Dromore	Dromore Urban (sole electoral area)	Created in 1902 (?)
Holywood	Holywood Urban (sole electoral area)	
Newcastle	Newcastle North Urban, and Newcastle South Urban	Established as an Urban District on 1 October 1905
Newry	Newry North Urban, Newry South Urban, and Newry West Urban	
Newtownards	Castle, Central, and Victoria	
Warrenpoint	Warrenpoint East Urban, and Warrenpoint West Urban	
Rural district	Electoral areas	Notes
Banbridge	Banbridge Rural, Dromore Rural, Gilford, Loughbrickland, and Moneyslane	Originally known as Banbridge No. 1 Rural District; renamed 28 February 1901.
Castlereagh	Castlereagh Rural (sole electoral area)	Originally known as Belfast No. 2 Rural District; renamed 13 June 1900.
Downpatrick	Ballynahinch, Castlewellan, Downpatrick, Killyleagh, Portaferry, and Strangford	
Hillsborough	Drumbeg, and Hillsborough	Briefly known as Lisburn No. 2 Rural District; renamed 3 June 1899.
Kilkeel	Kilkeel, and Rostrevor	
Moira	Moira Rural (sole electoral area)	Briefly known as Lurgan No. 2 Rural District; renamed 27 July 1899.
Newry No. 1	Newry Rural, and Rathfriland	
Newtownards	Comber, Grey Abbey, and Newtownards Rural	

== County Dublin ==
Urban district	Electoral areas	Notes
Blackrock	Blackrock No. 1 Urban, Blackrock No. 2 Urban, Booterstown, and Monkstown	
Clontarf		Absorbed by Dublin county borough 1900
Dalkey	Dalkey North Urban, and Dalkey South Urban	
Drumcondra, Clonliffe and Glasnevin		Absorbed by Dublin county borough 1900
Howth	Howth East Urban, and Howth West Urban	Established in 1919
Killiney and Ballybrack	Killiney and Ballybrack North Urban, and Killiney and Ballybrack South Urban	
Kingstown	Glasthule, Kingstown East Urban, Kingstown West Urban, and Monkstown	
New Kilmainham		Absorbed by Dublin county borough 1900
Pembroke	Pembroke East Urban, and Pembroke West Urban	
Rathmines and Rathgar	Rathmines and Rathgar No. 1 East Urban, Rathmines and Rathgar No. 2 East Urban, Rathmines and Rathgar No. 1 West Urban, and Rathmines and Rathgar No. 2 West Urban	
Rural district	Electoral areas	Notes
Balrothery	Balbriggan, Malahide, and Skerries	
Celbridge No. 2	Celbridge No. 2 Rural (sole electoral area)	
North Dublin	North Dublin Rural (sole electoral area)	
Rathdown	Rathdown No. 1 Rural (sole electoral area)	
South Dublin	South Dublin Rural (sole electoral area)	

== County Fermanagh ==
Urban district	Electoral areas	Notes
Enniskillen	Enniskillen East Urban, Enniskillen North Urban, and Enniskillen South Urban	
Rural district	Electoral areas	Notes
Belleek	Belleek Rural (sole electoral area)	Originally known as Ballyshannon No. 2 Rural District; renamed by 1902; incorporated into Irvinestown Rural District on 1 April 1921
Clones No. 2	Clones No. 2 Rural (sole electoral area)	Incorporated into Lisnaskea Rural District on 1 April 1921
Enniskillen	Ely, Enniskillen, Florencecourt, Holywell, Lisbellaw, Newporton, and Tempo	Originally known as Enniskillen No. 1 Rural District; renamed by 1902
Irvinestown	Clonelly, Ederny, and Irvinestown	Originally known as Irvinestown No. 1 Rural District; renamed by 1902
Lisnaskea	Brookeborough, Doon, and Lisnaskea	

== County Galway ==
Urban district	Electoral areas	Notes
Ballinasloe	Ballinasloe North East Urban, Ballinalsoe South East Urban, and Ballinasloe West Urban	
Galway	Galway East Urban, Galway North Urban, Galway South Urban, and Galway West Urban	
Rural district	Electoral areas	Notes
Ballinasloe No. 1	Ballinasloe Rural, Killallaghtan, Kiltormer, and Laurencetown	
Clifden	Clifden, Owengowla, Rinvyle, and Roundstone	
Galway	Clare Galway, Galway Rural, Inishmore, Moycullen, Oranmore, and Spiddle	
Glennamaddy	Glennamaddy, Kilcroan, Raheen, and Toberroe	
Gort	Ardrahan, Ballycahalan, Gort, and Kinvarra	
Loughrea	Athenry, Bullaun, Cappalusk, Kilteskill, Loughrea, Loughrea Rural, and Woodford	
Mountbellew [sic]	Clonbrook, Killeroran, and Mount Bellew [sic]	
Oughterard	Cloonbur, Lettermore, and Oughterard	
Portumna	Drummin, Eyrecourt, and Portumna	
Tuam	Abbey, Belclare, Dunmore, Headford, Hillsbrook, Tuam, and Tuam Rural	

== County Kerry ==
Urban district	Electoral areas	Notes
Killarney	Killarney East Urban, and Killarney West Urban	
Listowel	Listowel East Urban, and Listowel West Urban	
Tralee	Tralee North East Urban, Tralee South East Urban, and Tralee West Urban	
Rural district	Electoral areas	Notes
Caherciveen	Caher, Glanbehy, Loughcurrane, and Portmagee	
Dingle	Ballinvoher, Castlegregory, Dingle, and Ventry	
Kenmare	Ardea, Kenmare, Kilgarvan, and Sneem	
Killarney	Coom, Killarney Rural, Killorglin, Milltown, and Molahiffe	
Listowel	Ballyduff, Ballyhorgan, Killehenny, Lisselton, Listowel Rural, and Tarbert	Originally known as Listowel No. 1 Rural District; renamed between 1901 and 1912
Tralee	Ardfert, Brosna, Castleisland, Kilgarrylander, Ratass, Scartaglin, and Tralee Rural	

== County Kildare ==
Urban district	Electoral areas	Notes
Athy	Athy East Urban, and Athy West Urban	Created in 1900 from part of Athy No. 1 Rural District
Naas	Naas (sole electoral area)	Created in 1900
Rural district	Electoral areas	Notes
Athy No. 1	Athy Rural, Ballitore, Castledermot, Fontstown, Harristown, and Monasterevin	
Baltinglass No. 3		Absorbed into Athy No.1 Rural District some time between 1911 and 1925.
Celbridge No. 1	Celbridge, and Kilcock	
Edenderry No. 2	Cadamstown, Carbury, and Rathangan	
Naas No. 1	Ballymore Eustace, Kilcullen, Kildare, Kilmeage, Naas Rural, and Newbridge	

== County Kilkenny ==
Urban district	Electoral areas	Notes
Kilkenny Borough (City)	Kilkenny No. 1, and Kilkenny No. 2	
Rural district	Electoral areas	Notes
Callan	Callan, and Kilmaganny	Originally known as Callan No. 1 Rural District; renamed by 1901
Carrick-on-Suir No. 3	Carrick-on-Suir No. 3 Rural (sole electoral area)	
Castlecomer	Castlecomer Rural (sole electoral area)	
Ida	Ida Rural (sole electoral area)	Briefly known as New Ross No. 2 Rural District; renamed 1899.
Kilkenny	Freshford, Kilkenny Rural, and Tiscoffin	
Thomastown	Graiguenamanagh, Inistioge, Knocktopher, Thomastown, and Woolengrange	
Urlingford No. 1	Balleen, and Urlingford	
Waterford No. 2	Dunkitt, and Kilmakevoge	

== King's County ==
Urban district	Electoral areas	Notes
Birr	Birr North East Urban, Birr South East Urban, and Birr West Urban	
Tullamore	Tullamore East Urban, and Tullamore West Urban	Created in 1900
Rural district	Electoral areas	Notes
Birr No. 1	Banagher, Birr Rural, Clonmacnoise, Ferbane, Frankford, and Kinnity	
Clonygowan		Originally known as Mountmellick No. 2 Rural District; renamed between 1901 and 1912; absorbed into Tullamore Rural District by 1925.
Edenderry No. 1	Ballyburley, Clonbulloge, and Edenderry	
Roscrea No. 2	Mountheaton, and Shinrone	
Tullamore	Clara, Clonygowan, Killoughy, Philipstown, and Tullamore Rural	Originally known as Tullamore No. 1 Rural District; renamed between 1901 and 1912

== County Leitrim ==
Rural district	Electoral areas	Notes
Ballinamore	Ballinamore, and Newtowngore	Originally known as Bawnboy No. 2 Rural District; renamed by 1902
Carrick-on-Shannon No. 1	Carrick-on-Shannon, Drumreilly, and Drumshanbo	
Kinlough	Kinlough Rural (sole electoral area)	Originally known as Ballyshannon No. 3 Rural District; renamed by 1902
Manorhamilton	Drumahaire, Drumkeeran, Lurganboy, Manorhamilton, and Munakill	
Mohill	Carrigallen, Drumod, Mohill, Rinn, and Rowan	

== County Limerick ==
Rural district	Electoral areas	Notes
Croom	Adare, Castletown, and Croom	
Glin	Glin (sole electoral area)	Originally known as Listowel No. 2 Rural District; renamed by 1902
Kilmallock	Bruff, Bruree, Hospital, Kilfinnane, and Kilmallock	Originally known as Kilmallock No. 1 Rural District; renamed between 1901 and 1912
Limerick No. 1	Caherconlish, Cappamore, Castleconnell, and Limerick Rural	
Mitchelstown No. 2	Mitchelstown No. 2 Rural (sole electoral area)	
Newcastle	Abbeyfeale, Ardagh, Broadford, Monagay, and Newcastle	
Rathkeale	Askeaton, Pallaskenry, Rathkeale, Rathkeale Rural, and Shanagolden	
Tipperary No. 2	Tipperary No. 2 Rural (sole electoral area)	

== County Londonderry ==
Urban district	Electoral areas	Notes
Coleraine	Coleraine North East Urban, Coleraine South East Urban, and Coleraine West Urban	
Limavady	Limavady Urban (sole electoral area)	
Portstewart	Portstewart East Urban, and Portstewart West Urban	Established as an Urban District on 1 April 1916 from part of Coleraine RD
Rural district	Electoral areas	Notes
Coleraine	Aghadowey, Articlave, Garvagh, Kilrea, and Knockantern	
Limavady	Ballykelly, Bellarena, Dungiven, and Fruithill	
Londonderry No. 1	Claudy, Eglinton, and Waterside	
Magherafelt	Bellaghy, Draperstown, Maghera, Magherafelt, and Moneymore	

== County Longford ==
Urban district	Electoral areas	Notes
Granard	Granard Urban (sole electoral area)	
Longford	Longford North West Urban, and Longford South East Urban	Created in 1900
Rural district	Electoral areas	Notes
Ballymahon	Ballymahon, and Kilglass	Originally known as Ballymahon No. 1 Rural District; renamed between 1901 and 1912
Granard No. 1	Ballinalee, Columbkille, Edgeworthstown, and Granard Rural	
Longford	Ballinamuck, Drumlish, Killashee, and Longford Rural	

== County Louth ==
Urban district	Electoral areas	Notes
Drogheda Borough	Duleek Gate, St. Lawrence Gate, and West Gate	
Dundalk	Dundalk Middle Urban, Dundalk North Urban, Dundalk South Urban, and Seatown	
Rural district	Electoral areas	Notes
Ardee No. 1	Ardee, Castlebellingham, and Dunleer	
Dundalk	Carlingford, Dromiskin, and Dundalk Rural	
Louth	Louth Rural (sole electoral area)	Originally known as Drogheda No. 1 Rural District; renamed between 1901 and 1912

== County Mayo ==
Urban district	Electoral areas	Notes
Ballina	Ardnaree, Ballina North West Urban, and Ballina South West Urban	Created in 1900
Castlebar	Castlebar East Urban, and Castlebar West Urban	Created in 1900
Westport	Westport East Urban, Westport South Urban, and Westport West Urban	Created in 1900
Rural district	Electoral areas	Notes
Ballina	Ballina Rural, Ballycastle, Crossmolina, Killala, and Mount Falcon	
Ballinrobe	Ballinrobe, Cappaghduff, Cong, and Hollymount	
Belmullet	Bangor, Belmullet, and Knocknalower	
Castlebar	Bellavary, Castlebar Rural, Clonkeen, and Pontoon	
Claremorris	Ballyhaunis, Ballindine, and Claremorris	
Killala		Absorbed into Ballina Rural District some time between 1911 and 1925.
Swineford	Kilkelly, Kiltamagh, Meelick, Sonnagh, and Swineford	
Westport	Achill, Ballycroy, Islandeady, Louisburgh, Newport, and Westport Rural	

== County Meath ==
Urban district	Electoral areas	Notes
Kells	Kells North Urban, and Kells South Urban	
Navan	Navan North Urban, and Navan South Urban	
Trim	Trim Urban (sole electoral area)	
Rural district	Electoral areas	Notes
Ardee No. 2	Ardee No. 2 Rural (sole electoral area)	
Dunshaughlin	Dunboyne, and Dunshaughlin	
Edenderry No. 3		Absorbed into Trim Rural District in 1920
Kells	Kells Rural, Kilskeer, Moynalty, and Nobber	
Meath	Meath Rural (sole electoral area)	Originally known as Drogheda No. 2 Rural District; renamed between 1901 and 1912
Navan	Castletown, Navan Rural, and Painestown	
Oldcastle	Oldcastle (sole electoral area)	Originally known as Oldcastle No. 1 Rural District; renamed in 1903.
Trim	Athboy, Ballyboggan, Innfield, Summerhill, and Trim Rural	Absorbed Edenderry No.3 Rural District in 1920

== County Monaghan ==
Urban district	Electoral areas	Notes
Carrickmacross	Carrickmacross Urban (sole electoral area)	Created in 1900
Castleblayney	Castleblayney Urban (sole electoral area)	Created in 1900
Clones	Clones Urban (sole electoral area)	
Monaghan	Monaghan East Urban, and Monaghan West Urban	
Rural district	Electoral areas	Notes
Carrickmacross	Carrickmacross Rural, and Donaghmoyne	
Castleblayney	Ballybay, and Castleblayney Rural	Originally known as Castleblayney No. 1 Rural District; renamed by 1902
Clones No. 1	Clones Rural, and Dawsongrove	
Cootehill No. 2		
Monaghan	Castleshane, Emyvale, Kilmore, Monaghan Rural, and Scotstown	

== Queen's County ==
Rural district	Electoral areas	Notes
Abbeyleix	Abbeyleix, Ballinakill, Ballyroan, Castletown, Durrow, and Rathdowney	
Athy No. 2	Ballylynan, and Stradbally	
Mountmelick [sic]	Ballybrittas, Clonaslee, Coolrain, Emo, Maryborough, Mountmellick [sic], and Mountrath	Originally known as Mountmelick [sic] No. 1 Rural District; renamed by 1902
Roscrea No. 3	Roscrea No. 3 Rural (sole electoral area)	
Slievemargy	Slievemargy Rural (sole electoral area)	Originally known as Carlow No. 2 Rural District; renamed by 1902

== County Roscommon ==
Rural district	Electoral areas	Notes
Athlone No. 2	Athlone West Rural, Creagh, Dysart, and Kiltoom	
Ballinasloe No. 2		Absorbed into Athlone No. 2 Rural District some time between 1911 and 1925.
Boyle No. 1	Boyle, Boyle Rural, Croghan, and Keadew	
Carrick-on-Shannon No. 2	Aughrim, and Danesfort	Officially absorbed into Boyle No. 1 Rural District in 1923. Order to amalgamate issued by Ministry for Local Government in February 1923, council refused to obey and continued to operate outside of Free State supervision until the abolition of rural district councils in 1925.
Castlerea	Ballaghaderreen, Ballinlough, Castlerea, and Frenchpark	
Roscommon	Athleague, Cams, Drumdaff, and Roscommon	
Strokestown	Elphin, Roosky, Strokestown, and Tulsk	Absorbed into Roscommon Rural District some time between 1911 and 1925.

== County Sligo ==
Urban district	Electoral areas	Notes
Sligo Borough	Sligo East, Sligo North, and Sligo West	
Rural district	Electoral areas	Notes
Boyle	Ballymote, Carney, Cliffony, Collooney, Knockaree, and Riverstown	Originally known as Sligo Rural District (?)
Boyle No. 2	Coolavin, Kilmactranny, and Templevanny	
Dromore West	Castleconor, Dromor, and Skreen	
Tobercurry	Achonry, Aclaire, Coolaney, and Tobercurry	

== Tipperary (North Riding) ==
Urban district	Electoral areas	Notes
Nenagh		Created in 1900
Templemore	Templemore East Urban, Templemore North West Urban, Templemore South [sic] Urban	
Thurles	Thurles North Urban, and Thurles South Urban	
Rural district	Electoral areas	Notes
Birr No. 2		Absorbed into Borrisokane Rural District some time between 1911 and 1925.
Borrisokane	Borrisokane, Clougjordan, Riverstown, and Terryglass	
Nenagh	Ballina, Birdhill, Kilmore, Latteragh, Nenagh Rural, and Newport	
Roscrea No. 1	Bourney, and Roscrea	
Thurles	Borrisoleigh, Holycross, Littleton, Templetuohy, and Thurles Rural	

== Tipperary (South Riding) ==
Urban district	Electoral areas	Notes
Clonmel Borough	St. Mary's North, St. Mary's South, St. Patrick's, and St. Peter's	
Carrick-on-Suir	Carrick-on-Suir East Urban, Carrick-on-Suir West Urban, and Carrickbeg	
Cashel	Cashel East Urban, Cashel North West Urban, and Cashel South West Urban	
Tipperary	Tipperary East Urban, and Tipperary West Urban	Created in 1900
Rural district	Electoral areas	Notes
Carrick-on-Suir No. 1	Carrick-on-Suir No. 1 Rural (sole electoral area)	
Cashel	Cashel Rural, Fethard, Killenaule, Kilpatrick, and Tullamain	
Clogheen	Ardfinnan, Caher, and Clogheen	
Clonmel No. 1	Clonmel No. 1 Rural (sole electoral area)	
Gortnahoe		Originally known as Urlingford No. 2 Rural District; renamed between 1901 and 1912; absorbed into Slievardagh Rural District 1 April 1920.
Slievardagh	Ballingarry, Kilcooly, and Mullinahone	Briefly known as Callan No. 2 Rural District; renamed 1899.
Tipperary No. 1	Bansha, Cappagh, Emly, Golden, and Tipperary Rural	

== County Tyrone ==
Urban district	Electoral areas	Notes
Cookstown	Cookstown North Urban, and Cookstown South Urban	Created in 1900
Dungannon	Dungannon Centre Urban, Dungannon East Urban, and Dungannon West Urban	Created in 1900
Omagh	Omagh North Urban, Omagh South Urban, and Omagh West Urban	Created in 1900
Strabane	Strabane North Urban, and Strabane South Urban	Created in 1900
Rural district	Electoral areas	Notes
Castlederg	Castlederg, Clare, and Killeter	
Clogher	Augher, Aughnacloy, Ballygawley, Clogher, and Fivemiletown	
Cookstown	Coagh, Cookstown Rural, Pomeroy, and Stewartstown	
Dungannon	Caledon, Clonavaddy, Donaghmore, Moy, and Tullyniskan	
Omagh	Carrickmore, Dromore, Drumquin, Fintona, Gortin, Mountjoy, Omagh Rural, Six Mile Cross, and Trillick	
Strabane No. 1	Altaclady, Camus, Dunnamanagh, Newtown Stewart, and Plumb Bridge	
Trillick		Originally known as Irvinestown No. 2 Rural District; renamed by 1902; incorporated into Omagh RD on 1 April 1920

== County Waterford ==
Urban district	Electoral areas	Notes
Dungarvan	Abbeyside, Dungarvan Central Urban, and Dungarvan South West Urban	
Rural district	Electoral areas	Notes
Carrick-on-Suir No. 2	Portlaw, and Rathgormuck	
Clonmel No. 2	Clonmel No. 2 Rural	
Dungarvan	Dungarvan Rural, Ringville, Seskinan, and Whitechurch	
Kilmacthomas	Comeragh, Gardenmorris, and Kilmacthomas	
Lismore	Ballyduff, Cappoquin, Lismore, and Tallow	
Waterford No. 1	Kilmeadan, Tramore, Waterford Rural, and Woodstown	
Youghal No. 2	Youghal No. 2 Rural (sole electoral area)	

== County Westmeath ==
Urban district	Electoral areas	Notes
Athlone	Athlone East Urban, and Athlone West Urban	
Rural district	Electoral areas	Notes
Athlone No. 1	Athlone East Rural, Glassan, and Moate	
Ballymore	Ballymore (sole electoral area)	Originally known as Ballymahon No. 2 Rural District; renamed between 1901 and 1912
Coole	Coole (sole electoral area)	Originally known as Granard No. 3 Rural District; renamed between 1901 and 1912
Delvin	Clonarney, Delvin, Fore, and Kinturk	
Kilbeggan		Originally known as Tullamore No. 2 Rural District; renamed between 1901 and 1912; absorbed into Mullingar Rural District by 1925.
Mullingar	Castletown, Clonfad, Enniscoffey, Kilbeggan, Killucan, Knockdrin, Mullingar, Mullingar Rural, Multyfarnham, and Rathconrath	

== County Wexford ==
Urban district	Electoral areas	Notes
Wexford Borough	Wexford No. 1, Wexford No. 2, and Wexford No. 3	
Enniscorthy	Enniscorthy East Urban, Enniscorthy North West Urban, and Enniscorthy South West Urban	
New Ross	New Ross North East Urban, and New Ross South West Urban	
Rural district	Electoral areas	Notes
Enniscorthy	Ballyhuskard, Clonroche, Enniscorthy Rural, Ferns, Killann, and Newtownbarry	
Gorey	Coolgreany, Gorey, Gorey Rural, Kilcomb, and Monamolin	
New Ross	Carrigbyrne, Fethard, New Ross Rural, and Old Ross	Originally known as New Ross No. 1 Rural District; renamed by 1902
Wexford	Ardcavan, Bannow, Bridgetown, Rosslare, Tagmon, and Wexford Rural	

== County Wicklow ==
Urban district	Electoral areas	Notes
Arklow	Arklow East Urban, and Arklow West Urban	Constituted an Urban District 1 October 1909
Bray	Bray East Urban, Bray West Urban, and Little Bray	
Wicklow	Abbey, Castle, and Kilmartin	
Rural district	Electoral areas	Notes
Baltinglass No. 1	Baltinglass, Blessington, Dunlavin, and Rathdangan	
Naas No. 2		Absorbed into Baltinglass No. 1 Rural District on 1 April 1920
Rathdown No. 2	Rathdown No. 2 Rural (sole electoral area)	
Rathdrum	Arklow Rural, Dunganstown, Glendalough, Newcastle, Rathdrum, and Wicklow Rural	
Shillelagh	Coolattin, Killinure, and Tinahely	

== See also ==
- List of rural and urban districts in Northern Ireland (1921—1972)

== Sources ==
- "Alphabetical index to the county districts of Ireland". Census of Ireland, 1901: General topographical index. Command papers. Vol. Cd.2071. Dublin: HMSO. 1904. pp. 1040–1042.
- "Supplement to the alphabetical index to the county districts". Supplement to the general topographical index of Ireland. Command papers. Vol. Cd.6756. Dublin: HMSO. 1913. p. 17.
- Local Government Board for Ireland 27th Annual Report, 1900: (Containing Various Orders Made Modifying Boundaries Under the Local Government Act 1898 ). Command papers. Vol. C.9480. Dublin: HMSO. 1900. pp. 1–1022.
- Department of Industry and Commerce (1928). "Table 9. Population, Area and Valuation of Urban and Rural Districts and of all Towns with a Population of 1,500 Inhabitants or over, Showing Particulars of Town and Village Population and of the Number of Persons per 100 Acres" (PDF). Census of Population 1926. Vol. 1 — Population, Area and Valuation of each DED and each larger Unit of Area. Dublin: Stationery Office. pp. 19–29.
