= Ballyclare railway station =

Railway station in County Antrim, Northern Ireland

Coordinates: 54.751454°N 5.99751°W

Ballyclare
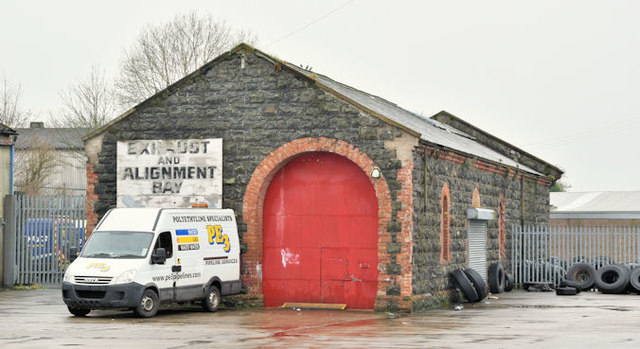
- The former goods shed, which is now a tyre store under Modern Tyres.

General information
- Location: Ballyclare, County Antrim; Northern Ireland

Other information
- Status: Disused

History
- Original company: Ballymena and Larne Railway
- Pre-grouping: Belfast and Northern Counties Railway
- Post-grouping: Northern Counties Committee

Key dates
- 24 August 1878: Station opens
- 1 October 1930: Station closes to passengers
- 3 July 1950: Station closes
Location

Ballyclare railway station was on the Ballymena and Larne Railway which ran from Ballymena to Larne in Northern Ireland.

== History ==
The station was opened by the Ballymena and Larne Railway on 24 August 1878. It was taken over by the Belfast and Northern Counties Railway in July 1889. This was in turn taken over by the Midland Railway, becoming the Northern Counties Committee in 1906.

The station closed to passengers on 1 October 1930 and then completely on 3 July 1950.

The building was demolished altogether in 2004 and was replaced with a similarly shaped and styled building. The site of the station is also where a Modern Tyres store is now located. A shed in their yard was said to be a rebuild of the old railway shed.

== Routes ==
Preceding station	Historical railways	Following station
Doagh	Ballymena and Larne Railway; Doagh-Larne	Ballynure
