= Kilwaughter =

Village in County Antrim, Northern Ireland

Coordinates: 54°49′59″N 5°53′26″W

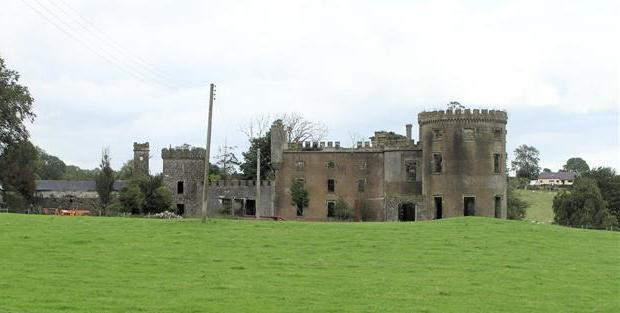
Kilwaughter Castle

Kilwaughter (Irish: Cill Uachtair) is a small village in County Antrim, Northern Ireland, near the town of Larne. It is in an electoral ward situated within the Mid and East Antrim Borough Council area. Kilwaughter is a rural village or hamlet. The village is in a civil parish of the same name.

Kilwaughter is the home of Kilwaughter Castle, built by John Nash between 1803 and 1807, for the Agnew family. Located on the site of an older 17th-century tower, the castle is situated in the hills, about 3 miles southwest of Larne. Seized by the government during WWII, Kilwaughter Castle was used to house soldiers in the 1940s. These soldiers were members of the American 644th Tank Destroyer Battalion and based here during preparations for the D-Day Landings. The castle remained uninhabited from that time and fell into disrepair - with collapsed floors and a collapsed roof. It is privately owned and not open to the public. As of 2017, a charitable trust was reportedly being formed to "stop further deterioration of the castle".

In addition to the still imposing castle, the landscape around Kilwaughter now finds itself marked by industry with a number of quarries operating in the local area.

== See also ==
- Kilwaughter Halt railway station
- List of villages in Northern Ireland
- List of civil parishes of County Antrim
