= Ballyclare =

Town in County Antrim, Northern Ireland

Coordinates: 54.751°N 5.999°W

Ballyclare: Irish: Bealach Cláir; Scots: Bellyclare
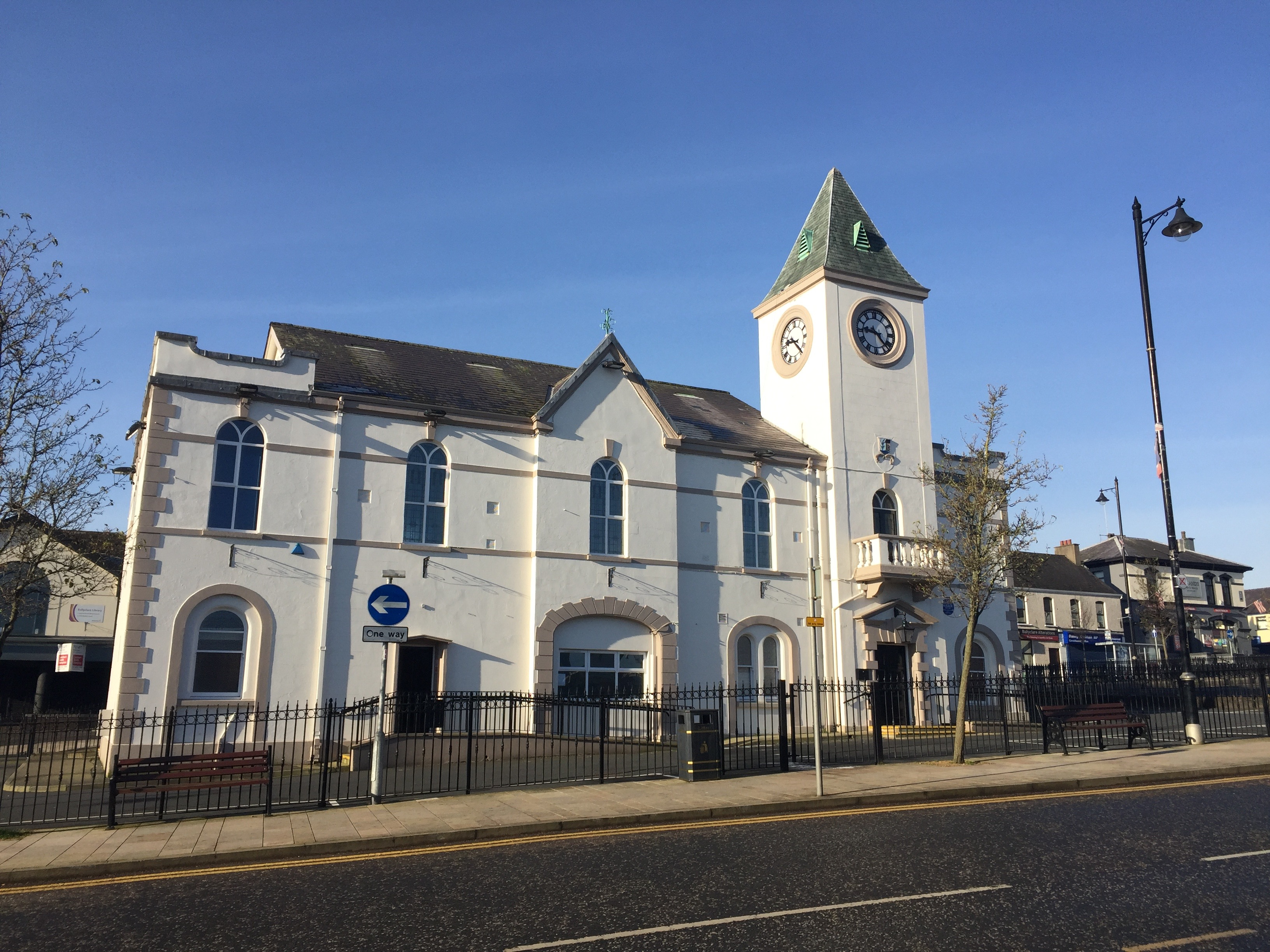
- Ballyclare Town Hall

- Location within Northern Ireland
- Population: 10,850 (2021 census)
- Irish grid reference: J312903
  - Belfast: 13 miles (21 km)
- District: Antrim and Newtownabbey
- County: County Antrim
- Country: Northern Ireland
- Sovereign state: United Kingdom
- Post town: BALLYCLARE
- Postcode district: BT39
- Dialling code: 028
- Police: Northern Ireland
- Fire: Northern Ireland
- Ambulance: Northern Ireland
- UK Parliament: South Antrim
- NI Assembly: South Antrim

Ballyclare (from Irish Bealach Cláir, meaning 'pass of the plain') is a market town in County Antrim, Northern Ireland. It is located within the Antrim and Newtownabbey Borough Council area, approximately 13 miles (21 km) north-northwest of Belfast. The town had a population of 10,850 according to the 2021 census. It is the principal settlement in the Ballyclare District Electoral Area.

It sits on the river Six Mile Water. The town probably owes its origins to its being a crossing point of the river, the strategic importance of which is shown by existence of a small Norman motte on the south side of the river and presently located in the War Memorial Park. The broad main street dates from the 17th century. In the centre of the town is the Market Square with the Town Hall. The town grew in the 19th century with the coming of the railway and it became an important industrial town with a large paper mill in the South West of the town and a large Linen Bleach Green. These factories gave their names to the roads leading to them, the Mill Road and the Green Road, but have been closed for some time. It is now a local service centre with a significant dormitory role in relation to Belfast. It is the main focus within the rural area for shopping, education and recreation. To the north is the remnant of Craig Hill, which once provided a wooded backdrop but is now covered with modern housing. Much of the Craig Hill has been quarried for its basalt.

== History ==
People have lived in Ballyclare for six thousand years. The earliest evidence of people in this area is a hoard of flint arrow heads found when houses were being built north of the river in November 1968. There were a total of thirty-nine flints discovered – some perfectly finished and others are blank indicating an 'industry' and trading here near the river crossing over four thousand years ago.

When the Normans built the castle at Carrickfergus they placed a line of outposts along the river which was then called the "Ollar" – River of the Rushes. In time the soldiers making the journey from Carrickfergus to Antrim reached the river at this spot when they had travelled six miles so began to call the Ollar the Six Mile Water. One of these mottes is close by the river in the War Memorial Park in Ballyclare. There are two on opposite sides of the river at Doagh and one at Antrim. The village grew after the Plantation of Ulster and was granted permission by King George II in 1756 to hold two fairs each year making it an important market centre.

At the same time as the Pilgrim Fathers landed in what is now the United States, Ballyclare was settled by Scots planters. Jonathan Swift preached in Ballyclare and it was from the town that the families of Mark Twain, Sam Houston and General Alexander Macomb left for America. The people of Ballyclare and the surrounding villages played a part in the Irish Rebellion of 1798, and fought in the Battle of Antrim. At the beginning of the 20th century Ballyclare was a growing industrial town with an urban district council and became the largest paper producer in Ireland.

As part of the 1947 Grand Prix season, which constituted the first full season of the FIA's Formula One motor racing, the 1947 Ulster Trophy race took place at Ballyclare.

== Climate ==
Climate data for Killylane, Elevation: 250 m (820 ft), 1991–2020 normals
Month	Jan	Feb	Mar	Apr	May	Jun	Jul	Aug	Sep	Oct	Nov	Dec	Year
Mean daily maximum °C (°F)	5.8 (42.4)	6.2 (43.2)	8.0 (46.4)	10.5 (50.9)	13.5 (56.3)	15.9 (60.6)	17.4 (63.3)	17.1 (62.8)	15.0 (59.0)	11.4 (52.5)	8.2 (46.8)	6.2 (43.2)	11.3 (52.3)
Daily mean °C (°F)	3.5 (38.3)	3.7 (38.7)	5.1 (41.2)	7.0 (44.6)	9.7 (49.5)	12.3 (54.1)	13.9 (57.0)	13.7 (56.7)	11.9 (53.4)	8.8 (47.8)	5.8 (42.4)	3.9 (39.0)	8.3 (46.9)
Mean daily minimum °C (°F)	1.3 (34.3)	1.2 (34.2)	2.2 (36.0)	3.6 (38.5)	5.9 (42.6)	8.6 (47.5)	10.4 (50.7)	10.3 (50.5)	8.8 (47.8)	6.2 (43.2)	3.4 (38.1)	1.6 (34.9)	5.3 (41.5)
Average precipitation mm (inches)	122.0 (4.80)	97.7 (3.85)	100.9 (3.97)	87.3 (3.44)	85.8 (3.38)	89.2 (3.51)	103.7 (4.08)	114.1 (4.49)	107.0 (4.21)	138.1 (5.44)	144.8 (5.70)	131.8 (5.19)	1,322.3 (52.06)
Average precipitation days (≥ 1.0 mm)	18.2	15.6	15.7	13.6	13.3	13.3	15.6	16.2	14.7	17.1	19.0	18.3	190.5
Mean monthly sunshine hours	42.5	56.5	91.0	144.0	181.7	148.3	140.5	134.6	110.0	71.5	33.6	38.3	1,192.3
Source: Met Office

== Demography ==
As of the 2021 census, there were 10,850 people living in Ballyclare (4,614 households), an increase of 9% on the 2011 census population of 9,953.

In the 2021 census the demographics of the town was as follows:

- 78.86% (8,556) belong to or were brought up in a 'Protestant and Other Christian (including Christian related)' religion, 5.35% (581) belong to or were brought up in the Catholic denomination, 0.98% (106) belong to or were brought up in 'Other religions' and 14.8% (1,606) had no religious background
- 72.23% (7,837) indicated that they had a British national identity, 41.22% (4,472) had a Northern Irish national identity and 4.73% (530) had an Irish national identity (respondents could indicate more than one national identity)
- 16.62% (1,803) had some knowledge of Ulster-Scots and 1.71% (185) had some knowledge of Irish (Gaelic)

In the 2011 census the demographics of the town was as follows:

- 21.64% were aged under 16 years and 14.89% were aged 65 and over
- 52.16% of the usually resident population were female and 47.84% were male
- 85.72% belong to or were brought up in a 'Protestant and Other Christian (including Christian related)' religion and 5.36% belong to or were brought up in the Catholic denomination
- 77.35% indicated that they had a British national identity, 32.53% had a Northern Irish national identity and 4.45% had an Irish national identity (respondents could indicate more than one national identity)
- 37 years was the average (median) age of the population;
- 15.03% had some knowledge of Ulster-Scots and 1.91% had some knowledge of Irish (Gaelic)

The population has grown significantly over the last 40 years from 1,999 in 1971 to 8,654 in 2001 to 9,953 in 2011 and 10,850 in 2021, an increase of 443%.

== Notable buildings ==
- Ballyclare Town Hall developed out of the old Market House which was a 3–bay, 2–storey building built about 1855. It was later extended and developed with a clock tower being added. The clock has only three faces, with no face on the western side.
- The oldest buildings in the town are the Old Presbyterian Church (established 1642) in the Main Street and its former Manse on the Mill Road (a private dwelling since 1979), the Old Manse was used as a school during the 1800s and also had the church lawn tennis court located behind it. The Manse had been remodelled at times in its history retaining some Georgian interior detailing, mainly in the hallway. However renovations in the 1990s revealed that the stone building retains some early worked woodwork including joists dating to possibly the 17th century.
- The Ballyclare Primary School building was originally built in 1880 and has been extended several times since. The 1880 school house as a 1920s extension, a 1950s extension and a 2006 mobile classrooms addition. There are also two large post-primary schools, a grammar school on the Rashee Road and called Ballyclare High School, and a state Secondary School with access from the Doagh Road and Avondale Drive.

== Culture ==
=== Literature ===
Archibald McIlroy's novel When Lint Was in the Bell is a light-hearted, lightly fictionalised chronicle of life in 19th-century Ballyclare. A Ballyclare native, born c. 1860, Mr. McIlroy was lost in the sinking of the RMS Lusitania in 1915.

=== Music ===
There are two musical ensembles in the town: the Ballyclare Male Choir (founded in 1933) and the Ballyclare Victoria Flute Band (founded 1919). The Major Sinclair Memorial Pipe Band is also based in the town and has participated in Royal Scottish Pipe Band Association (RSPBA) competitions. The Clare Chorale is a mixed voice community choir based in Ballyclare.

=== Fair ===
The annual Ballyclare May Fair occurs, on a Tuesday in May, as part of a week of festivities. The tradition stems from a grant by King George II to hold two yearly fairs, although only the May fair now survives. The event began as a local horse fair, but representatives of cavalry regiments came from all over Europe to buy there as the reputation of the fair spread. The fair's heyday ended with World War I, but it is still a traditional event in the town.

== Notable people ==
- Andy Cairns, guitarist and vocalist in the band Therapy? is from Ballyclare.
- Gareth Maybin, European Tour golfer, is from the town.
- Willie John McBride, a former Ireland and British & Irish Lions rugby captain, is a resident of the town.
- Paddy McNair, a professional footballer with Middlesbrough FC and the Northern Ireland national football team, was a Ballyclare Secondary School.
- Jonathan Rea, six time world superbike champion, is a native of Ballyclare.
- Tommy Wright, a former Northern Ireland national football team goalkeeper and manager of St Johnstone and of Kilmarnock.

== Transport ==
=== Road ===
Roads leading into Ballyclare's town centre include the Hillhead Road from the south, the Doagh Road from the west and the Rashee, Ballyeaston and Ballycorr Roads from the north and north east. Car parking available in the town centre ranges from surface-level parking to free and paid on-street parking.

=== Rail ===
Ballyclare had a narrow gauge rail link to Larne and a broad gauge connection to Belfast. Neither of these have been in use since 1950. Ballyclare railway station on the narrow gauge Ballymena and Larne Railway opened on 24 August 1878, closed to passenger traffic on 1 October 1930, goods traffic on 3 June 1940 and finally altogether on 3 July 1950. The station on the broad gauge Northern Counties Committee railway line opened on 3 November 1884, closed for passenger traffic on 1 January 1938, goods traffic on 2 May 1938 and finally altogether on the same date as its narrow gauge counterpart in 1950. The building was demolished altogether in 2004.

== Education ==
There are two primary schools in the town (Ballyclare Primary School and Fairview Primary School). The local post-primary schools include Ballyclare High School and Ballyclare Secondary School.

== Sport ==
- Ballyclare Comrades F.C., based at Dixon Park plays in the NIFL Championship.
- Ballyclare Rugby Football Club, formed on 20 May 1949. The community based club is based at "The Cloughan" on the Doagh Road and offers rugby for all. 4 Senior Teams, 3 Youth Teams, a thriving Mini Rugby Section, Ladies Rugby and Clare Hares (Special Needs).
- Templepatrick Cricket Club also plays at the Cloughan.
