= Ballymena and Larne Railway =

Railway line in Northern Ireland

Coordinates: 54.855°N 5.811°W

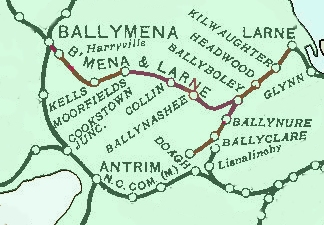
The line in 1906

The Ballymena and Larne Railway was a 3 ft (914 mm) narrow gauge railway in County Antrim, Northern Ireland. The first part opened in July 1877 and regular passenger services began in August 1878, the first on the Irish 3 ft (914 mm) gauge railways. Passenger services ended in 1933 and the last part of the railway closed in 1950.

== Routes ==
From east to west, the railway ran for 32 miles (51 km) between Larne and Ballymena via Kilwaughter, Headwood, Ballyboley, Ballynashee, Collin, Moorfields, Kells and Harryville. A branch line operated from Ballyboley to Doagh via Ballynure and Ballyclare. From Larne, the line rose for 12 miles (19 km) to a summit of 660 feet (200 m) at Ballynashee. The gradient was, in places, as steep as 1 in 36. The line operated both passenger and goods traffic; transport of locally mined iron ore was the main reason for the construction of the line.

== Early years ==
Belfast and Northern Counties and Ballymena and Larne Railway Companies Amalgamation Act 1889
- Act of Parliament
- Parliament of the United Kingdom
- Long title: An Act for amalgamating the Ballymena and Larne Railway Company with the Belfast and Northern Counties Railway Company.
- Citation: 52 & 53 Vict. c. xcvii

Dates
- Royal assent: 26 July 1889

Text of statute as originally enacted

The line between Larne and Ballyclare opened in 1877. The line between Ballyboley and Ballymena opened in August 1878. The railway originally terminated at Harryville on the outskirts of Ballymena; in 1880 it was extended to Ballymena's main line Belfast and Northern Counties Railway (B&NCR) station, where it also made a connection with the Ballymena, Cushendall and Red Bay Railway. The extension from Ballyclare to Doagh opened in 1884. The line's original steam locomotives were built by Beyer, Peacock & Company of Manchester to a design similar to those built for the Isle of Man Railway. By the late 1880s the County Antrim iron ore industry was in decline. The railway experienced financial difficulties and was taken over by the B&NCR in July 1889 by the Belfast and Northern Counties and Ballymena and Larne Railway Companies Amalgamation Act 1889 (52 & 53 Vict. c. xcvii).

== Later years ==
The B&NCR was itself taken over by the Midland Railway (of England) in 1903, which in turn became part of the London, Midland & Scottish Railway (LMS) in 1923. The Midland and the LMS operated its lines in Northern Ireland through its Northern Counties Committee (NCC). Following the takeover, the parent companies were able to invest in new locomotives and equipment. Following World War I, the line experienced a further decline in mineral traffic and increasing road competition. Nevertheless, the LMS invested in new carriages for the line in 1928. These carriages were arguably the most comfortable and modern ever built for an Irish narrow gauge line, including steam heating, electric lighting, lavatories and corridor connections between the coaches. The steamer expresses took 60 minutes from Ballymena to Larne with one stop and 64 minutes eastbound with three stops.

In early 1933 the railway system in Northern Ireland was severely disrupted by a strike. The management announced that passenger services would not resume. The strike also saw the closure of the Castlederg and Victoria Bridge Tramway. Passenger services between Ballyclare and Doagh had already ended in October 1930. Goods trains between Ballymena and Ballyboley Junction ended in 1940. The 12 mile long Larne to Ballyclare railway remained open until 3 July 1950, when the Ulster Transport Authority (which took over the LMS/NCC in 1949) closed the remaining part of the line. This followed the closure of a paper mill at Ballyclare, which had supplied much of the line's remaining freight traffic. The UTA also closed the Ballycastle Railway on the same day.

== See also ==
- List of narrow-gauge railways in Ireland
- Ballycastle Railway
- Ballymena, Cushendall and Red Bay Railway
- Castlederg and Victoria Bridge Tramway
- Cavan and Leitrim Railway
- Clogher Valley Railway
- County Donegal Railways Joint Committee
- List of heritage railways in Northern Ireland
- Londonderry and Lough Swilly Railway
