= Dundalk railway works =

Railway works in Dundalk, Ireland

Dundalk Railway Works
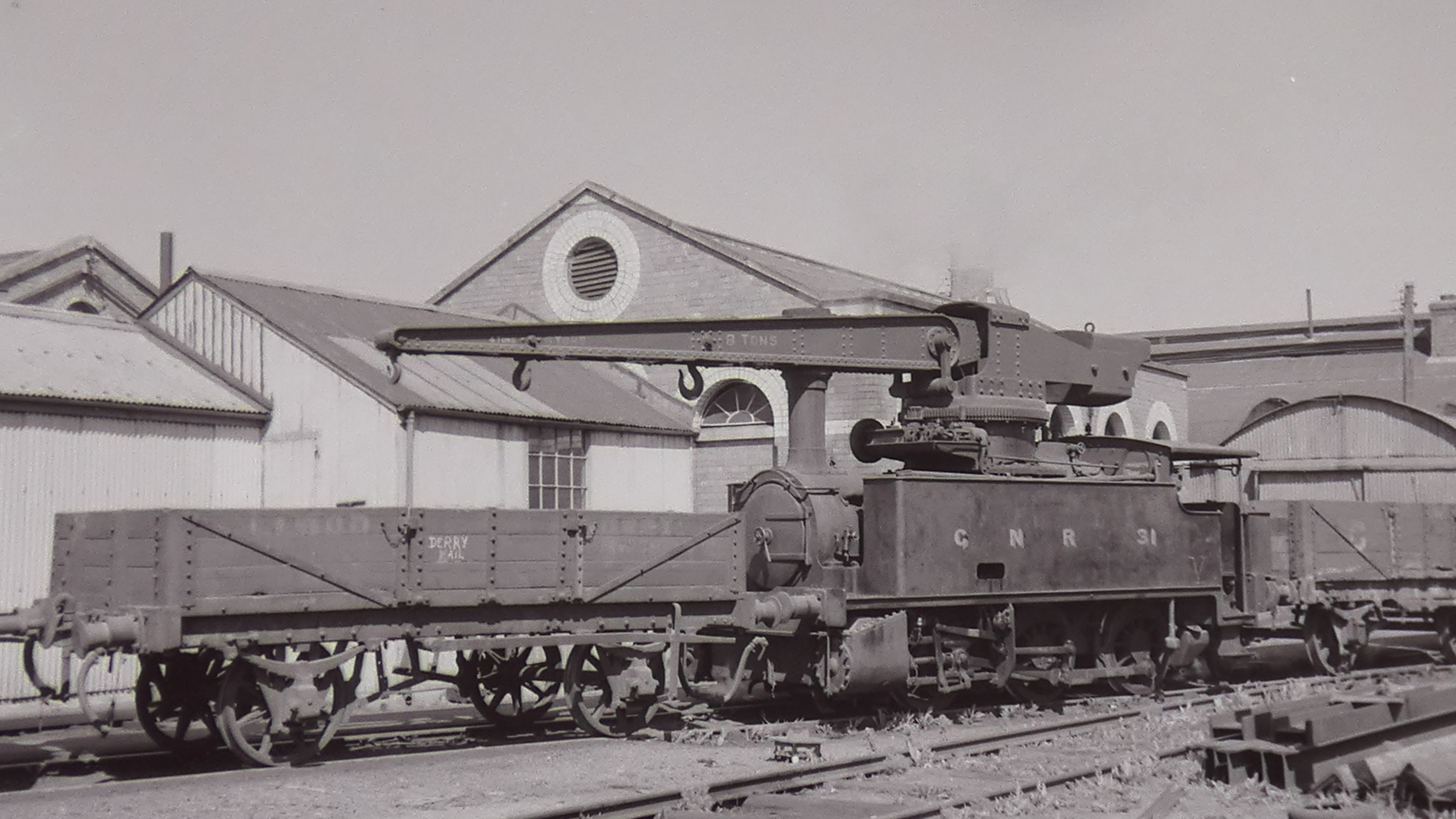
- Steam crane, with the GNR's Dundalk works in the background, in 1955
- Interactive map of Dundalk Railway Works

Location
- Location: Ardee Road, Dundalk, County Louth
- Coordinates: 53.9959°N 6.4119°W

Characteristics
- Type: Locomotive, Steam, Diesel, DMU, Carriage, Freight
- Routes served: Dublin-Belfast Line

History
- Opened: October 1881
- Closed: 1958
- Original: Great Northern Railway

Dundalk railway works, also known as the Great Northern Railway Locomotive Carriage and Wagon Works, was a railway maintenance facility operated initially by the Great Northern Railway (GNR) in Dundalk, County Louth, Ireland. The GNR works at Dundalk was responsible for the company's fleet of road and rail vehicles, carriages, buses, locomotives and wagons. The railway works, which was established in October 1881, closed on 1 October 1958. It was located just south of Dundalk Clarke Railway Station.

== History ==
The Great Northern Railway (GNR) was formed in 1876. Dundalk, which is located almost halfway along the Dublin to Belfast mainline, was chosen by the GNR as the location for its railway works. Opened in October 1881, a number of the site's buildings were designed by the GNR chief engineer William Hemingway Mills.

The works was involved in the maintenance, overhaul and rebuild of the GNR's fleet of road and rail vehicles, including railway carriages, locomotives, buses and wagons. Among the vehicles developed at the works was the Howden–Meredith railbus, developed by works managers George Howden and R. W. Meredith.

Under leadership of James Park, two 32-ton freight locomotives "Class A" were built in 1882. Between 1885 and 1893, ten 4-4-0 "Class J" locomotives were built. Charles Clifford took over management of the works in 1895. He oversaw the production of six 2-4-2T "JT Class" locomotives, named Sutton, Howth, Aster, Crow, Viola and Tulip. "Class S" locomotives was Clifford's final design. "VS Class" locomotives were the last steam engines produced in the works. These were numbered 206-210, and named Boyne, Erne, Foyle, Lagan and Liffey. In 1938, "Class S" and "S2" were rebuilt and renewed. The works also produces many road vehicles including fifty-three Gardiner buses from 1937 to 1942, and nine Regent buses in 1953.

In 1950, GNR introduced twenty new Diesel-Mechanical AEC railcars. These railcars could operate with up to two unpowered intermediate coaches, which were built in GNR Dundalk Works. In 1954, the GNR Board placed an order for twenty-six railcars, and the contract was given to British United Traction (BUT). The underframes, and structural elements were delivered to Ireland and construction took place in 1957 at Dundalk works for the BUT Railcars.

== Decline ==
By the 1950s, GNR was in financial decline and it had a £1,900,000 deficit by 1952. In 1958, the GNR was dissolved and its assets were divided between the two state railway companies, Coras Iompar Eireann and Ulster Transport Authority. Despite a large protest of over one thousand GNR workers in 1957, the railway works at Dundalk closed in 1958.

== Legacy ==
The works continued to be used for engineering after the GNR's closure. The Irish government helped to establish Dundalk Engineering Works (DEW) and other companies were also set up, including Frank Bosner & Co. and Heinkel Cabin Scooters Ltd. DEW was contracted to build generator "Dutch" vans for CIE from 1969 to 1970.

In 1958 this company was also involved in producing Heinkel bubble three-wheelers. Over 6000 Kabine scooters were manufactured in the works. Due to issues with quality control, workshops having dirt floors, and leaving the axles outside, the scooter licence was withdrawn from DEW.

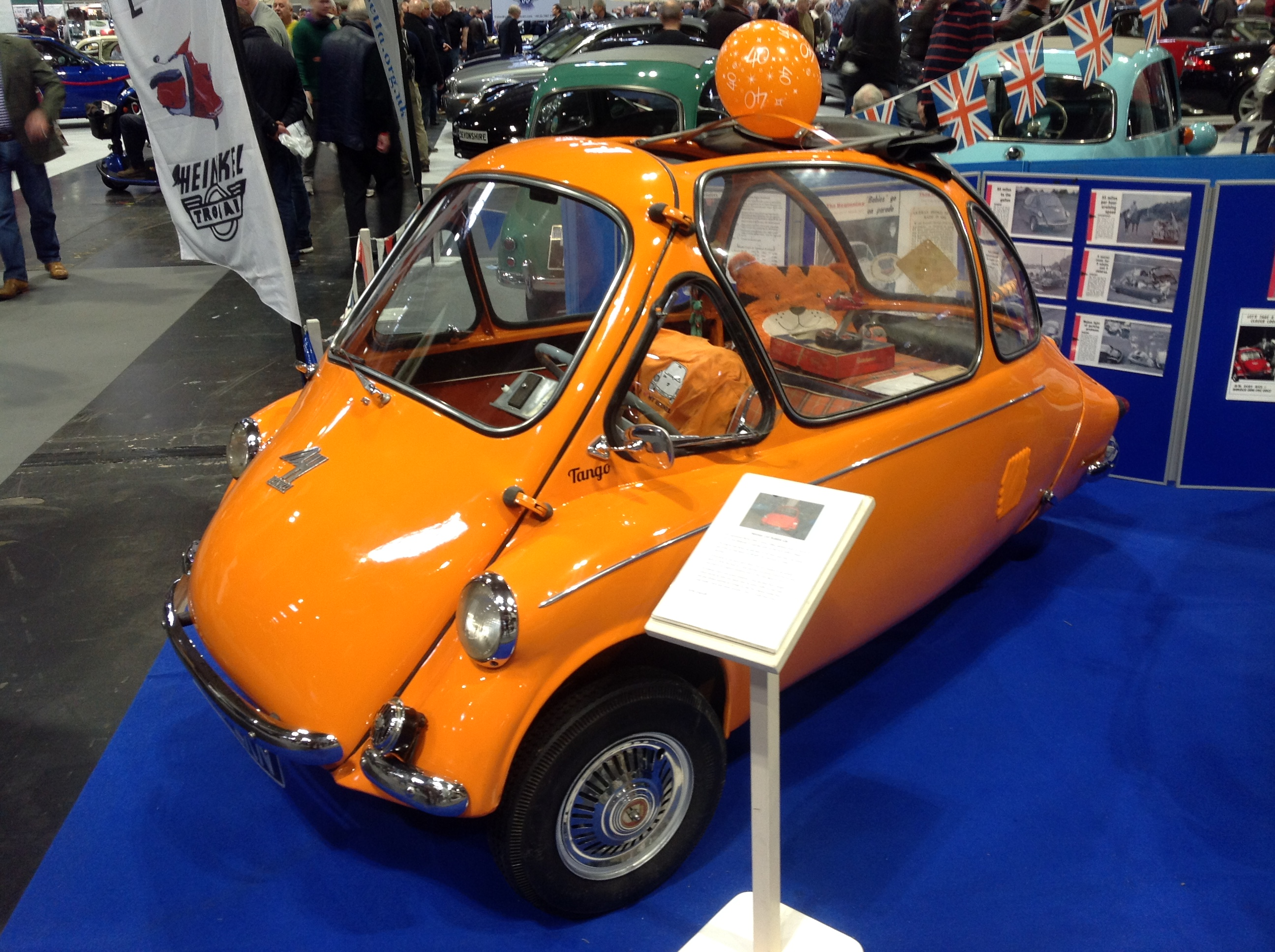
An example of a Heinkel bubble car

DEW also built many narrow gauge locomotives(LM375, LM354-LM373) for Bord na Mona.

In 1985, DEW's US-based parent company S&S Engineering gave notice that DEW would be shutdown.

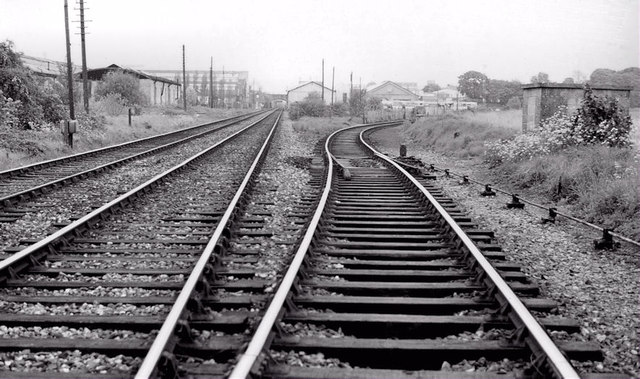
Dundalk South junction in 1983 with GNR works in right background. The junction allowed trains to reach the Barrack St branch and the adjacent yard associated with the GNR works.

As of the 21st century, a number of buildings associated with the Dundalk works still stand and are used as a garage and offices. The bus garage is used by Bus Éireann.

== Preservation ==
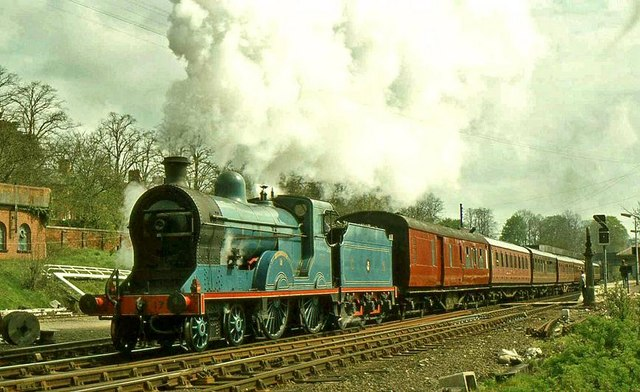
No.171 Slieve Gullion

No.171 Slieve Gullion

No.171 was rebuilt in Dundalk in 1938, and remains in preservation as part of the RPSI collection. Although called a "rebuild", so many of the major parts were replaced that it was virtually a new engine.

462 Dutch Van

462 Dutch Van, built in the former GNR works site by the Dundalk Engineering Works company is still in preservation at RPSI's Whitehead museum.

"The Works" Exhibition

In July 2025, the Dundalk Railway Heritage Society, in collaboration with the Model Railway Society of Ireland, presented a model railway exhibition showcasing a scale model of the G.N.R.(I) Railway Works in Dundalk.

== See also ==
- Inchicore railway works
- Dundalk AFC, which had its origins as a works team
