= Enterprise (train service) =

Train service between Dublin, Ireland, and Belfast, Northern Ireland

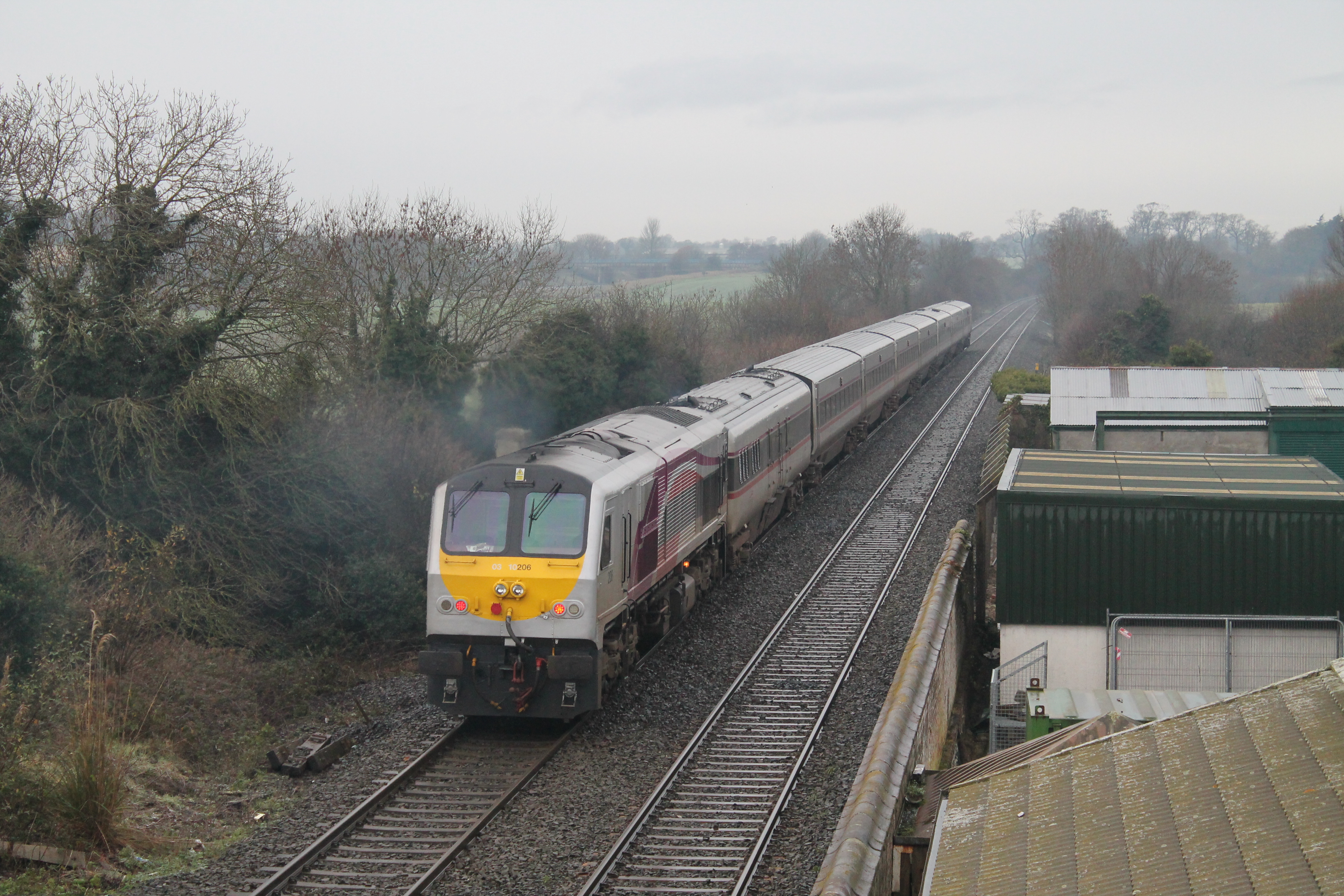
- Locomotive 206 passes Moira en route to Dublin Connolly
- Franchise: Not subject to franchising (1997 - present)
- Operator: Iarnród Éireann/ Northern Ireland Railways
- Main stations: Dublin Connolly, Belfast Grand Central
- Other stations: Drogheda MacBride, Dundalk Clarke, Newry, Portadown. Lurgan and Lisburn (08:05 ex Belfast & 20:50 ex Dublin, Sunday only)
- Fleet: Eight 201 Class locomotives Twenty eight De Dietrich carriages Four Mark 3 generator vans
- Stations called at: 8

Technical
- Length: 181km

Enterprise is the cross-border inter-city train service between Dublin Connolly in the Republic of Ireland and Belfast Grand Central in Northern Ireland, jointly operated by Iarnród Éireann (IÉ) and NI Railways (NIR). It operates on the Belfast–Dublin railway line.

== History ==
The Great Northern Railway (Ireland) (GNR(I)) introduced the service as the "Enterprise Express" on Monday 11 August 1947 in an attempt to compete with air and road transport which were challenging the railways.

The inaugural service was hauled by GNR (I) Steam Locomotive No.83 "Eagle." This name would later appear on NIR Diesel Electric locomotive No. 101.

Billed as a prestige service, this allowed many of the intermediate stops between the two cities to be cut out reducing the journey time from around 3 hours 45 minutes to 2 hours 15 minutes which aided business travel, which even today, remains an important market.

Customs checks were limited to the Belfast and Dublin terminals, rather than lengthy stops at Goraghwood and Dundalk, to reduce journey times by ensuring non-stop service. Another innovation saw the introduction of advance ticket booking.

The name of the train comes from the "enterprising" approach that the GNR(I) took to make journeys more convenient for passengers despite the requirement for customs checks. The initial service ran between Belfast Great Victoria Street and Dublin Amiens Street Junction (renamed Dublin Connolly in 1966). Locomotives of GNRI Class V were initially used, followed in 1948, by GNRI Class VS.

A special train of Great Northern's most modern coaches was made up for the Enterprise. Normally this would consist of seven coaches, but this could be increased to ten during busy summer months. The 2 hour 15 minute timing allowed for this load and included provision for some delays en-route, such as temporary speed restrictions for track repairs.

In comparison to the Enterprise service, the GNR (I) timetable for the Dublin - Belfast link in 1932 allocated 2 hours 2 minutes running time, equivalent to 1 hour 55 minutes non-stop, but station stops brought the overall end-to-end timing to 2 hours 25 minutes.

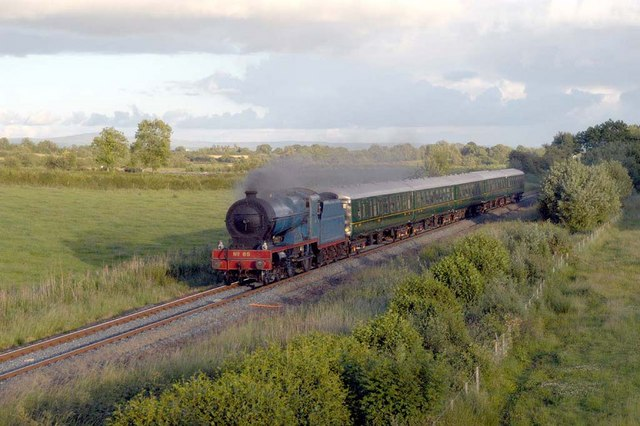
GNR (I) Class V "Merlin" which was one of the original locomotives tasked with hauling the Enterprise service

For the first year of operation the "Enterprise," consisted of only one train in each direction. This comprised a 10:30 departure from Belfast, returning at 17:30 from Dublin, and was hauled by one or other of the GNRI Class V 4-4-0 Compound Locomotives Nos. 83 - 87, named respectively; Eagle, Falcon, Merlin, Peregrine and Kestrel, after birds of prey. Painted in GNR (I)'s colour scheme of sky-blue and vermillion, they were affectionately nicknamed the "Bluebirds."

In May 1948, a second train was brought into the schedule, giving a morning service at 09:30 from Dublin, returning from Belfast at 17:15. Towards the end of 1948 five new locomotives, specially built for the Enterprise, took over the service. These were GNRI Class VS 4-4-0 Nos. 206 - 210, named; Liffey, Boyne, Lagan, Foyle and Erne, after rivers which crossed the railway network.

The next development took place in 1950, when new AEC / Park Royal Vehicles Diesel Mechanical Railcars were introduced on the Dublin-based train. This train, however, had to be restricted to four coaches - one of the limitations of these particular units. They did have the distinction, however, of being the first successful mainline diesel railcars in the British Isles.

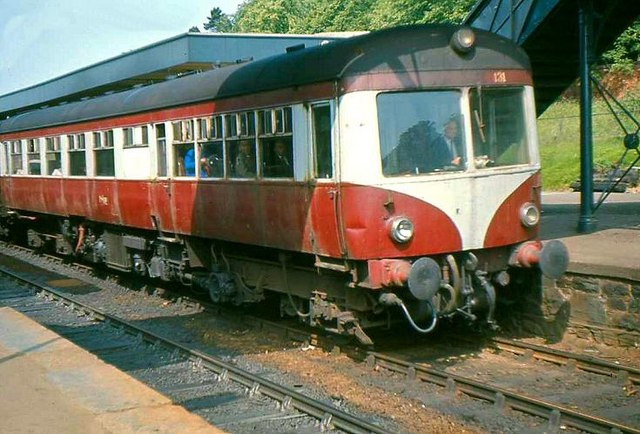
B.U.T. railcars became a common sight on the Enterprise service during the 1950s.

In October 1950, in conjunction with CIÉ, the service was extended to Glanmire Road station (renamed to Cork Kent in 1966) in Cork. Two sets of coaches were used, one GNR (I) and one CIÉ, working Belfast - Dublin - Cork and Cork - Dublin - Belfast on alternative days. The GNR (I) locomotives were used between Belfast and Dublin, and CIÉ steam locomotives between Dublin (Amiens Street) and Cork. The extended service saw the southbound train operating a journey time of 6 hours 45 minutes and the northbound train running a schedule of 6 hours 15 minutes.

However this proved unsuccessful, in part due to the considerable journey time. The service lasted until June 1953 although a through coach to Cork was still conveyed on the Enterprise until September 1953.

In October 1953 the governments of the Republic of Ireland and Northern Ireland nationalised the GNR as the Great Northern Railway Board (GNRB). The GNRB ordered new diesel-mechanical railcars of a more powerful design, which by using intermediate power cars with half-cabs and gangway ends, were capable of operating in sets of up to 8 coaches. Referred to as B.U.T. railcars, due to their design by British United Traction, they were introduced on the Belfast-based train in 1957 and the Dublin-based train in 1958, enabling timings to be reduced to 2 hours 10 minutes, and ending steam traction on Enterprise.

On 1 October 1958 the GNRB was dissolved and its assets and liabilities were split between Córas Iompair Éireann (CIÉ) and the Ulster Transport Authority (UTA) — the predecessors of Iarnród Éireann (IÉ) and Northern Ireland Railways (NIR) respectively. In 1960, the first intermediate stop was introduced, when the 17:30 (ex) Dublin began to call at Dundalk to pick up passengers for Belfast.

The Dublin-based train reverted to locomotive haulage in 1962, when the first of CIÉ's new Electro-Motive Diesel 141 Class locomotives were introduced.

April 1965 saw the Enterprise service upgraded to four trains each way per day - each set making two round trips. This gave services at 08:00, 11:30, 14:00 and 17:30 from Belfast, and 08:30, 11:00, 14:30 and 17:30 from Dublin. The number of ordinary stopping trains on the route was severely cut at the same time, in order to make the new express schedule work, and several additional stops at Portadown and Dundalk were made by the Enterprise services to replace these local trains.

Northern Ireland Railways came into existence in 1967, and shortly afterwards a complete new train was ordered for the NIR operated service. This was a radical advance on the B.U.T. railcars, and comprised Diesel-Electric main line locomotives and a train of eight BR MkIIb coaches, identical to the latest type entering service on British Railways, with suitable modification for Irish gauge.

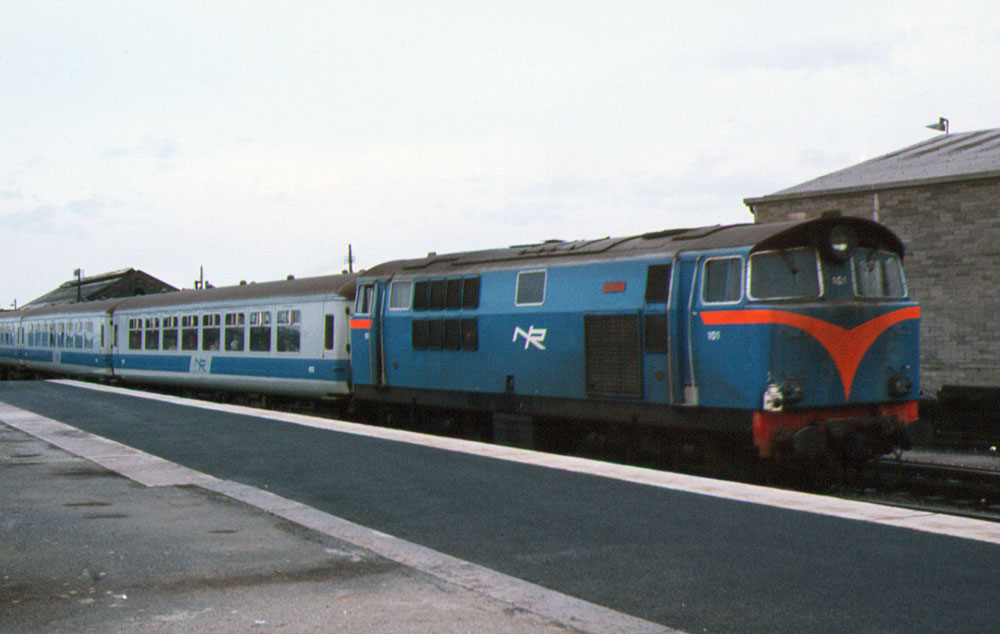
An NIR "Hunslet" which was the mainstay of Enterprise operations from Belfast during the 1970s.

Three NIR 101 Class locomotives were built; Nos. 101 - 103, appropriately named Eagle, Falcon and Merlin after their GNR predecessors. These locomotives were of the Bo-Bo wheel arrangement and produced 1,350 horsepower. The trains were designed to work in a push-pull formation, with driving trailers, or with a locomotive at each end. The locomotives were designed by the Hunslet Engine Company, Leeds, and assembled at BR's Doncaster Works. This gave rise to the locomotives being fondly referred to as the Hunslets.

In 1972 CIÉ introduced BR MkIIe air-conditioned coaches on their train, bringing the standard into line with the NIR set. Further coaches were acquired by NIR, enabling the Enterprise to be made up to twelve coaches and two locomotives when required.

The Belfast Central Railway was re-opened in 1976 following the completion of the Belfast Central Line Project, which involved the relaying of track along the route of the former line, and this saw the Belfast terminus moved to the newly constructed Belfast Central Station in April of that year. The new station was named after the former railway and was located some distance from Belfast City Centre, adjacent to the city's markets. (The name was a source of confusion to tourists and was eventually renamed to Belfast Lanyon Place in 2018).

The year 1976 also saw Northern Ireland customs examination moved to Portadown, the Republic's having been moved to Dundalk a few years previously. This necessitated a further five minutes of allotted time for northbound trains. Also in 1977 regular stops at Drogheda became a feature of Enterprise. To enable the same overall timings to be maintained faster and more powerful CIÉ 181 Class locomotives replaced the older 141 Class on the schedule.

The service was upgraded in September 1997 with a new timetable and new coaching stock from French train makers De Dietrich Ferroviaire (now Alstom DDF). At this point the service, which had operated under either the IÉ or NIR brands, was branded separately as Enterprise.

From the early 1970s until the late 1990s the service has suffered disruption, as a consequence of the Troubles, when it was regularly halted by bomb threats. These became so frequent and caused such considerable disruption to the service that a campaigning group, the Peace Train Organisation was formed in 1989. Since the Northern Ireland peace process however, such disruption has diminished. Renewed investment in recent years has seen the line upgraded to continuously welded track capable of 145 km/h (90 mph) running along the southern part of the route, as part of Iarnród Éireann's rail network upgrades. The Northern Ireland section of the line was also upgraded to 90 mph running on many sections of the line.

Today the journey times vary between 2 hours 5 minutes (with four intermediate stops) and 2 hours 20 minutes (with six intermediate stops), with an average speed of 93 and 84 km/h (58 and 52 mph) respectively.

The Railway Preservation Society of Ireland runs a steam Enterprise in the summer months to exchange its Dublin-based engine with its Whitehead-based engine.

=== Autumn 2009 disruption ===
On Friday 21 August 2009 20 m (22 yd) of the Broadmeadow estuary viaduct, north of Malahide, collapsed, causing serious disruptions to Enterprise services. During the disruption the Enterprise operated between Belfast Central and Drogheda, with buses connecting Drogheda with Dublin Connolly. The line reopened on Monday 16 November with full services resumed.

=== Mid-life refurbishment ===
The Enterprise underwent a face-lift during between November 2007 and early 2009, with the carriages being resprayed in silver with green livery, some of which could be seen at Translink's York Road Maintenance Depot.

In 2014, a mid-life refurbishment programme was announced for the Enterprise service. Rotating refurbishment involved substituting non-Enterprise trainsets on an individual basis which began in November 2014, with a return to service of the first revamped coaches in November 2015. Refurbishment provided new mechanical running gear, in coach electronics and modernised interiors. The first refurbished set, consisting of DVT 9002 and Locomotive 206, operated a trial service from York Road Depot in Belfast to Dublin Connolly and back, on Thursday 15 October 2015.

=== Recent developments ===
Press reports from 2007 have stated that NIR & IÉ plan to introduce a new hourly service. This was reiterated in a statement by Conor Murphy, the then Northern Ireland Minister for Regional Development, who stated that the two companies had made a presentation to the North/South Ministerial Council in October 2007 putting forward the case for improvements in the frequency and speed of the service.

Any improvements to the service would require significant investment in track and signalling, as well as new rolling stock. In April 2008, the then Minister for Regional Development stated that the major improvements to the infrastructure and rolling stock required by Enterprise would be in the region of £500 million. However, the introduction of an hourly timetable remains an ambition for NIR and IÉ.

The line south of the border was upgraded to continuous welded rail in the 1990s, while NIR has also made track improvements to allow an increase in speed. Enterprise would require a minimum of seven trains to operate an hourly service – until 2013, IÉ had a significant number of stored Mark 3 rolling stock available, of which five sets were push-pull capable.

However, all of IÉ's Mark 3 carriages were scrapped during 2013 and 2014. NIR also withdrew its "Gatwick" set in June 2009 and it has been preserved by the RPSI. The introduction of the 22000 Class could potentially be used to enhance the frequency of the Enterprise which has led to a surplus of locomotives that could be utilised. The major issue remains the capacity at Dublin Connolly, which is stretched.

In July 2024, as part of a set of major improvements to its national timetable, Iarnród Éireann announced that Enterprise would transition to an hourly frequency following the opening of Belfast Grand Central. The expanded service operates from Monday to Saturday, and allows arrivals in both Belfast and Dublin before 9.00am. In order to meet the new service frequency from its launch, the existing Enterprise fleet is being supplemented by a pair of 22000 Class units, and one double Class 3000 unit from NI Railways, each of which are six cars long. This is until the planned entry into service of the new fleet from 2029. The service began on 29 October 2024.

A €700 million (£550 million) contract has been signed to replace the entire Enterprise train fleet.

== Rolling stock ==
=== Current fleet ===
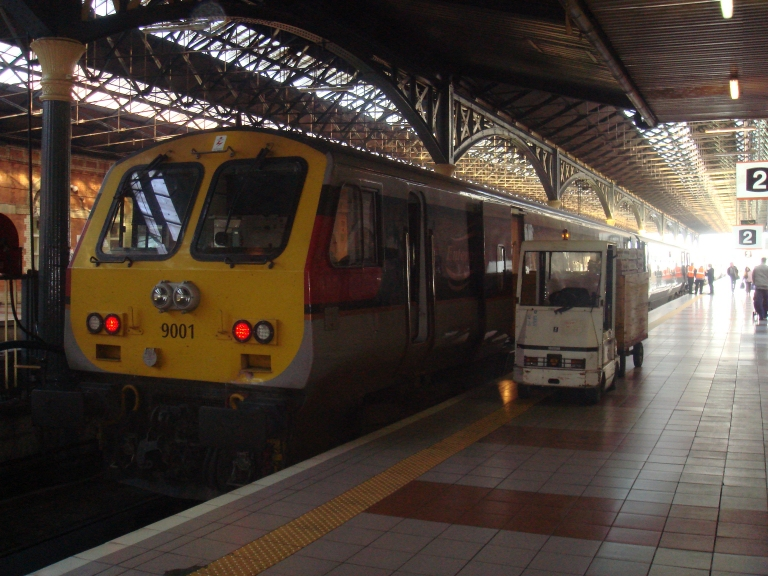
Enterprise Control Car 9001 stands at Dublin Connolly

Each push-pull trainset consists of seven coaches and a 201 Class locomotive. The 28 carriages were delivered as four sets of seven but entered service as three sets of eight, with two locomotives from each operator. The coaches were manufactured by De Dietrich Ferroviaire, while the locomotives are from GM-EMD; ownership of the rolling stock is shared between both operators, with carriage maintenance by NIR and locomotives maintained by IÉ. The coaching stock is based on the Class 373 Eurostar stock, with the interiors identical to the pre-overhaul Eurostar interior. The Eurostar stock is articulated and permanently coupled, while the Enterprise is ordinary coaching stock.

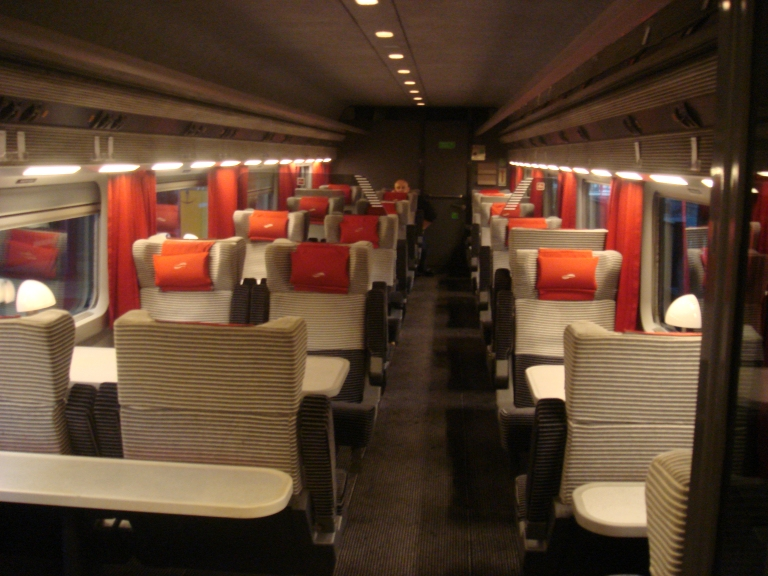
The interior of a First Plus carriage, built to a similar design and specification as Eurostar's rolling stock

The service had suffered from a lack of reliability of the locomotives, which provide head end power to the train. Unlike IÉ's Dublin-Cork services, which operate with the locomotive operating with a generator control car that provides power for lighting and heating the train, the Enterprise fleet was only equipped with an ordinary control car, which had no power generating capability. This meant that the locomotive had to provide all the power for the train, both motive and generating. Extended operation in this mode caused damage, so four further locomotives were allocated to Enterprise from the IÉ fleet. However, this still required locomotives to be used in HEP mode, so in May 2009 the Minister for Regional Development in Northern Ireland requested an estimate for the provision of generator functions for the existing rolling stock so that head-end power mode would no longer be needed.

In order to avoid further problems, a modified Mark 3 Generator van, formerly 7604, was introduced on Monday 10 September 2012. Three further such generator vans have since entered service.

Class	Image	Type	Top speed		Number	Built
Class	Image	Type	mph	km/h	Number	Built
201 Class	Belfast Central (2)	Diesel locomotive	102	164	8	1994–1995
De Dietrich stock	Belfast Central (1)	Passenger coaches	90	145	28	1996
Mark 3	Belfast Central (3)	Generator van	100	160	4	1980 (Refurbished 2009)

If an Enterprise set is unavailable, either a NIR or an IÉ set can be used. Both NIR and IÉ have equipped six each of their newest DMUs (3000 and 29000) and ten 22000 Class DMUs to each other's specifications so they may be used in the event of a breakdown.

=== Future fleet ===
Both IÉ and NIR have an ambition to introduce hourly services, but it would be necessary to procure new, faster rolling stock to achieve the required improvements in frequency and speed. In 2005, they investigated procuring new rolling stock when seven 125 mph (200 km/h) capable Class 222 DEMUs built for the British network became available as one of the possible options, which also included the procurement of additional 22000 Class DMUs as part of IÉ's order. New rolling stock would most likely be a multiple unit rather than locomotive-hauled, similar to IÉ's plans for Dublin-Cork services.

In 2023, IÉ and NIR published a tender valued at €650 million for a fleet of 8 new battery-equipped electro-diesel multiple units, capable of making the journey between Dublin and Belfast in 2 hours or less. They are to be designed to allow for the removal of their diesel engines and conversion to dual-voltage operation in the future. It is hoped the entire fleet will be in service by 2029. In 2024, an announcement was made that funding totalling €165m had been secured from the PEACE PLUS programme.

On 18 September 2025, the contract to construct the new sets was awarded to Stadler Rail. A court challenge from unsuccessful tenderer Construcciones y Auxiliar de Ferrocarriles put the contract on hold and threatened the loss of EU funding, leading the court to lift the injunction and allow the contract to continue on 26 November.

The new trains will be Ireland’s first "tri-mode" fleet, capable of running on electric, diesel, and battery power to reduce emissions. Delivery is expected to begin in late 2028, with the new trains replacing the current ageing fleet fully by 2030. Each train will feature approximately 400 seats, spacious dining areas, and step-free accessibility with six dedicated wheelchair spaces.

== Criticism ==
In November 2007 the cross-border IBEC-CBI Joint Business Council, in a submission to the North/South Ministerial Council, stated that Enterprise was falling behind compared to the improvements of other international rail providers, with delays "often up to an hour" and serious reliability problems and an uncompetitive journey time against making the journey by road.

With the faster road journey to Dublin and the Enterprise's unreliability and infrequency, it has faced a loss of revenue as passengers switch to much cheaper and faster alternatives.

== Gallery ==
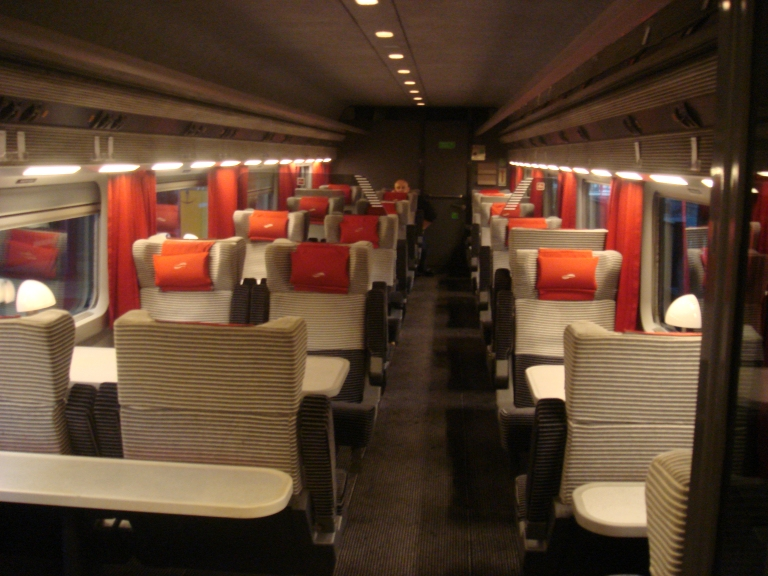
The interior of a First Plus carriage

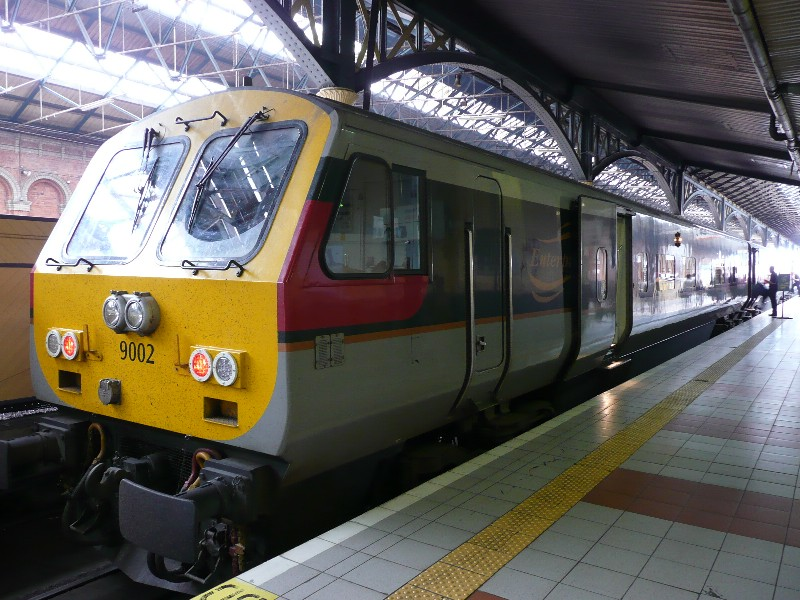
Enterprise Control Car 9002 at Dublin Connolly in 2007

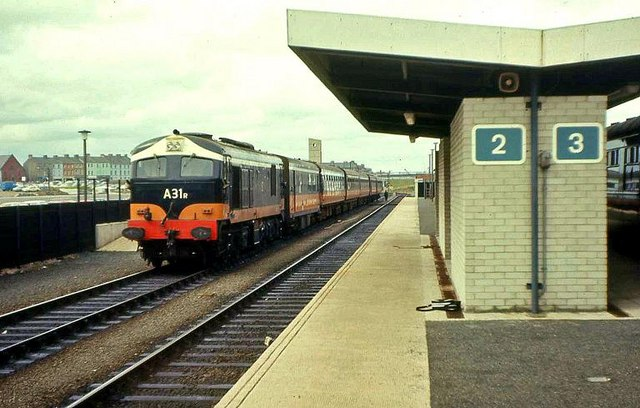
A 001 Class locomotive powers an Enterprise service through Portadown in 1972.

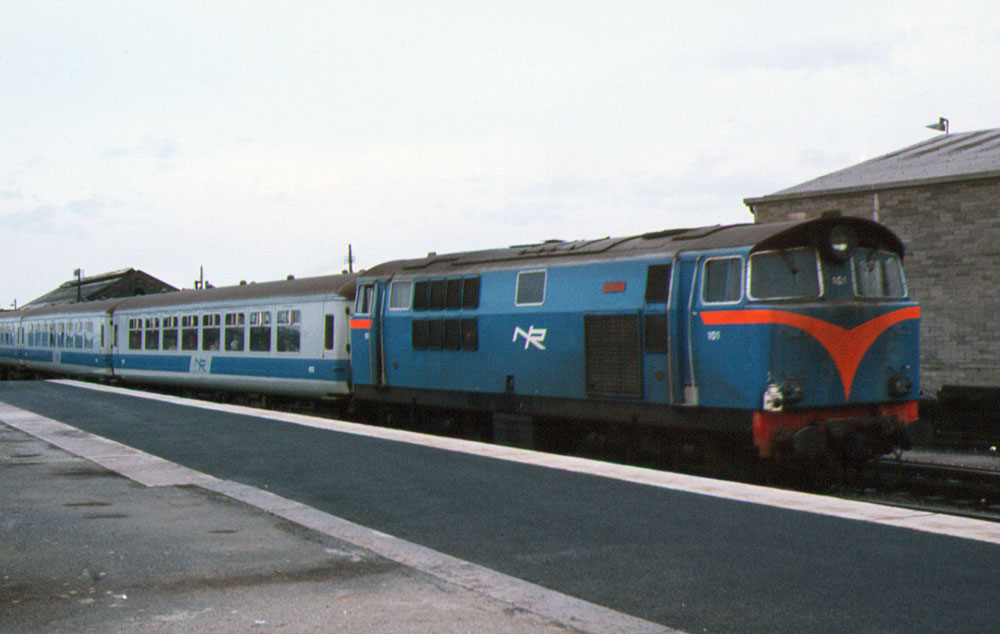
A 101 Class locomotive with an Enterprise service arriving at Dublin Connolly in 1980

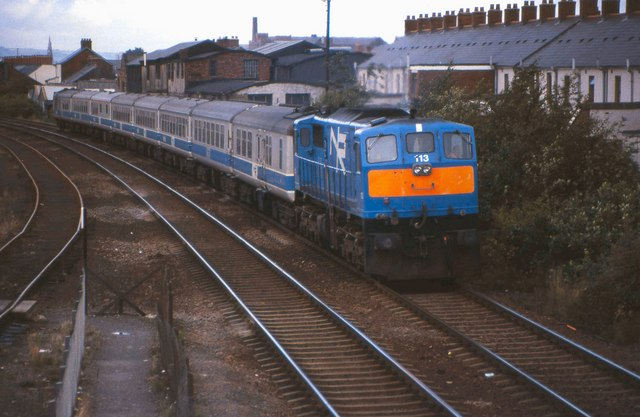
A 111 Class hauling a rake of Mark 2 carriages at Adelaide in 1988

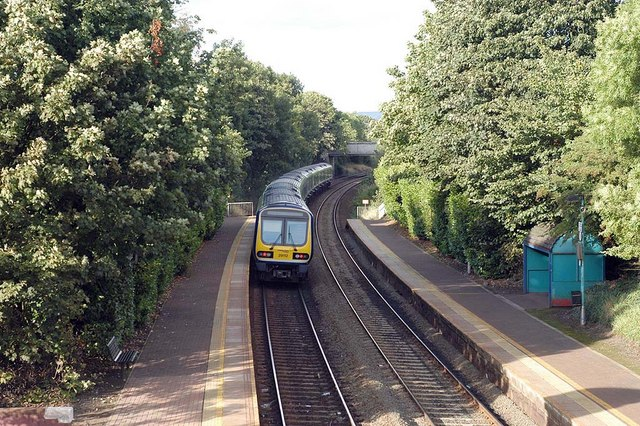
A 29000 Class DMU works an Enterprise service through Lambeg in 2005.

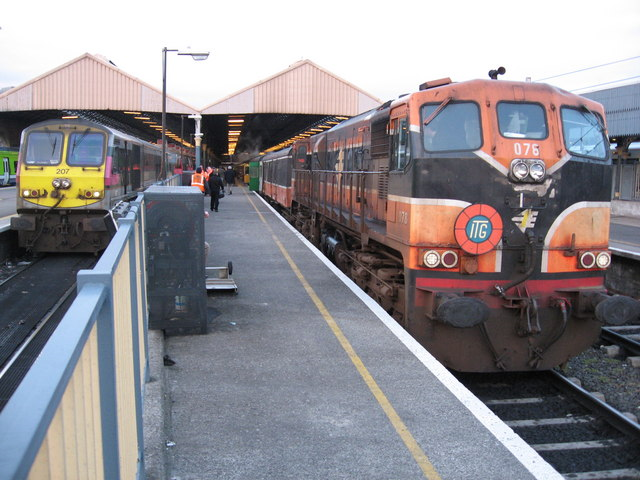
The Enterprise at Dublin Connolly next to a Railtour to Sligo in 2010

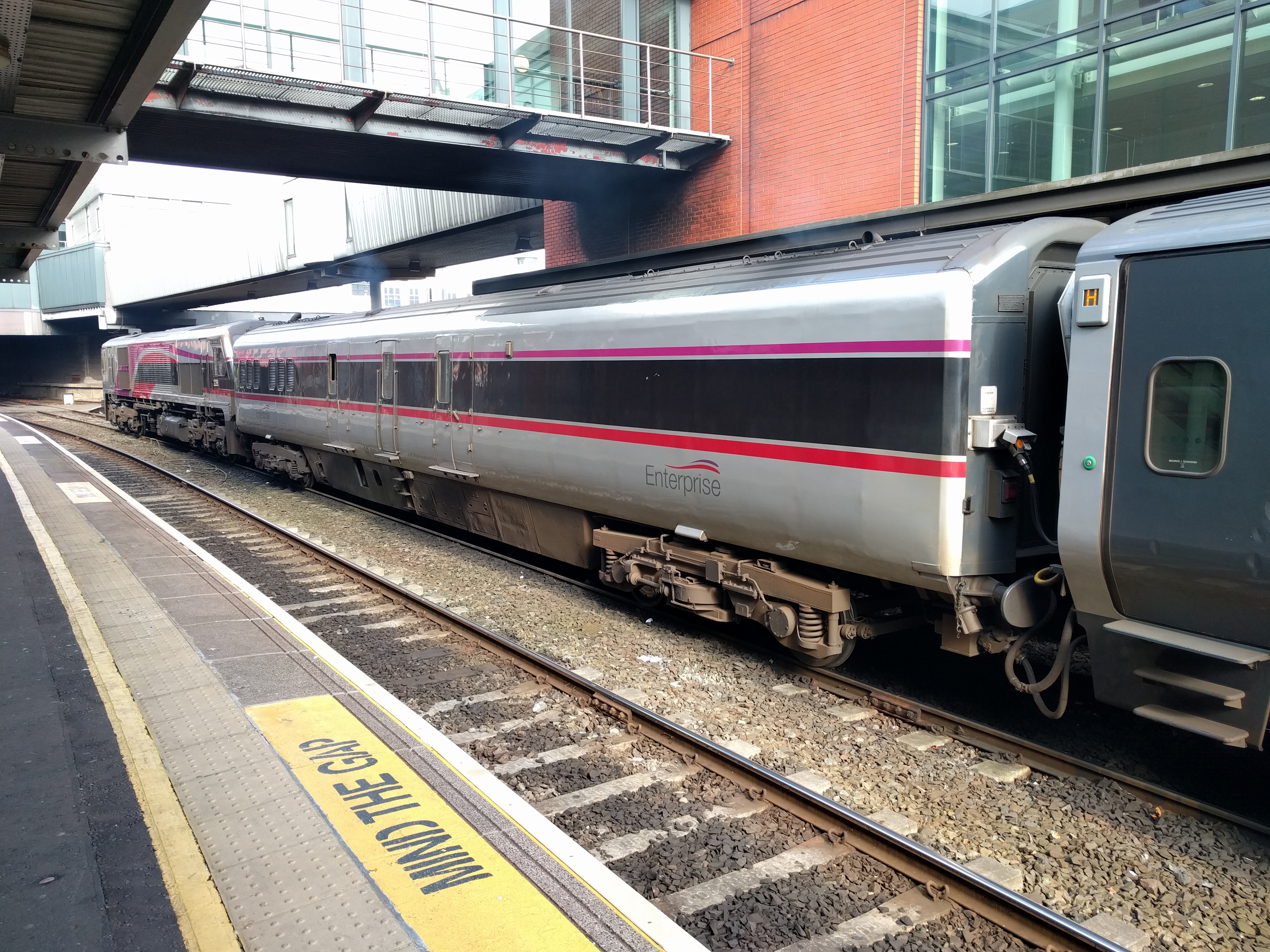
Enterprise Generator Van at Belfast Central in 2016
