= NIR 101 Class =

Northern Irish Diesel-Electric Locomotive

Northern Ireland Railways 101 class
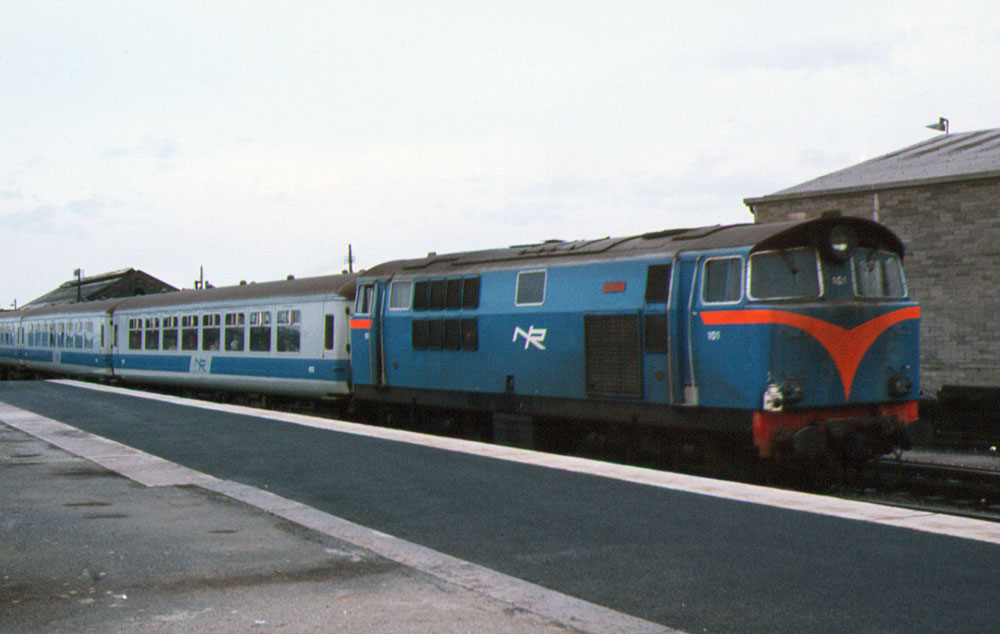
- NIR 101 Eagle with an Enterprise service in Dublin in September 1980
Type and origin
- Power type: Diesel-electric
- Builder: Hunslet Engine Company
- Serial number: 7197–7199
- Build date: March–June 1970
- Total produced: 3
Specifications
- Configuration
  - UIC: Bo′Bo′
- Gauge: 1,600 mm (5 ft 3 in)
- Wheel diameter: 3 ft 4 in (1,020 mm)
- Minimum curve: 300 ft (91 m)
- Wheelbase
  - Bogie: 7 ft 9 in (2,360 mm)
- Pivot centres: 23 ft 6 in (7,160 mm)
- Length
  - Over headstocks: 41 ft 6 in (12,650 mm)
  - Over buffers: 45 ft 2 in (13,770 mm)
- Width: 10 ft 4 in (3,150 mm)
- Height: 13 ft 2 in (4,010 mm)
- Axle load: 17 long tons (17 t)
- Service weight: 68 long tons (69 t)
- Fuel capacity: 450 US gal (1,700 L)
- Prime mover: English Electric 8CSVT Mk II
- Train brakes: Air
Performance figures
- Maximum speed: 80 mph (130 km/h)
- Power output: 1,350 hp (1,010 kW)
- Tractive effort
  - Starting: 42,000 lbf (190 kN)
  - Continuous: 25,200 lbf (112 kN)
Career
- Operators: Northern Ireland Railways
- Class: 101
- Numbers: 101–103
- Withdrawn: 1989–1999
- Disposition: 1 preserved, 2 scrapped

The NIR 101 Class are three diesel-electric locomotives formerly operated by Northern Ireland Railways (NIR). With the return to the working of the Enterprise service from Belfast to Dublin with coaching stock instead of diesel railcar sets, NIR found itself with no suitable main line diesel locomotives. The 101 Class (DL) became the answer to this problem, working in conjunction with newly acquired British Rail Mark 2 coaches.

== History ==
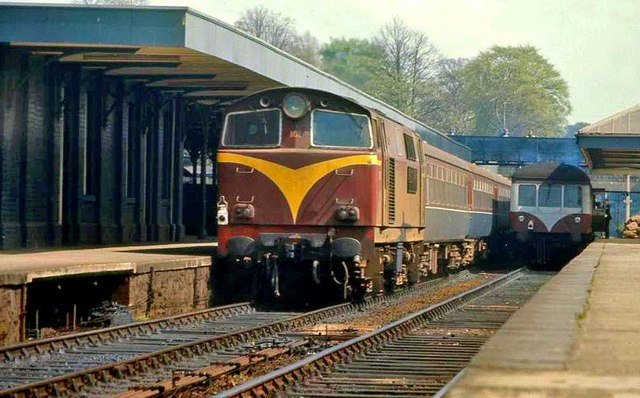
Class 101 locomotive at Lisburn in the original maroon livery on a Belfast Bound Service in 1977

The 101 Class locomotives were designed for the Enterprise passenger services between Belfast and Dublin, replacing NIR DMUs and reducing the time for the 180 km (110-mile) journey to two hours. The design of the superstructure and bogies was carried out by the Hunslet Engine Company with English Electric-AEI Traction being responsible for the traction equipment. The contract stipulated a ten-month delivery period but with Hunslet's workshops already committed, the superstructure and assembly was contracted out to British Rail Engineering Limited's Doncaster Works, with Hunslet manufacturing the bogies. They were of Bo-Bo wheel arrangement and fitted with CSVT Mk. II 1,350 horsepower (1,010 kW) engines. The locomotives were fitted with buckeye couplers as standard and had air brake capability for operation with the Mark 2 coaches.

The 101 Class were visually, mechanically and electrically similar to the 1,000 mm (3 ft 3 3/8 in) metre gauge Class 22 locomotives of Keretapi Tanah Melayu (Malaysian Railways), built by English Electric at around the same time, however these had a Co-Co arrangement and an uprated power unit.

All three locomotives re-used names from GNRI Class V locomotives, as follows:

Key:	Scrapped	Preserved

No.	Name	Works No.	Date Completed	Current Status
101	Eagle	7197	8 May 1970	Scrapped in 2010 by Railway Preservation Society of Ireland
102	Falcon	7198	22 May 1970	On static display at the Ulster Folk & Transport Museum
103	Merlin	7199	8 June 1970	Scrapped in 1997 by Northern Ireland Railways

No. 103 was originally planned to be named Kestrel.

== Liveries ==
When delivered the locomotives were painted maroon with a 'flowing V' on the ends in a golden yellow colour. The "NIR" logo and numbers were transfers. From 1978 the livery was changed to blue with an orange/red shallow 'V' stripe on each end (see photograph above). No. 102 later carried a slightly darker shade of blue with black cab surrounds and yellow end panels.

== Operations ==
The locomotives began operating the Enterprise on 4 July 1970, following a press launch of the new service on 3 July when a special train, carrying invited guests, ran from Great Victoria Street, Belfast to Dublin with two locomotives working the train, one at each end. This was generally well received, however comments were made regarding the train "hunting" due to the second locomotive pushing from the rear.

For the Enterprise service the 101 Class operated with eight British Rail Mark 2 carriages acquired by NIR at the same time as the locomotives. They normally operated in a top and tail formation with one locomotive at each end of the train .It was also possible to run as a push-pull formation with a driving trailer and two locomotives at the same end of the train, or on quieter services, in winter, with only five carriages and a single locomotive.

== Replacement and withdrawal ==
The locomotives were displaced from the Enterprise workings by the arrival of the NIR 111 Class locomotives in the early 1980s. Using the 101 Class locomotives on the Belfast–Derry line was considered but, although only around 10 years old, they were suffering from regular failures in service and were cascaded to lesser duties, such as shunting in Adelaide Yard.

All three locomotives were progressively withdrawn from service, the first in 1989 (103) and the last in 1998 (102). Number 103 was scrapped in 1997. Numbers 101 and 102, however, were stored at the Railway Preservation Society of Ireland (RPSI) site in Whitehead, County Antrim. After two years out of service, 102 was briefly re-instated as a working locomotive in 2001. This was short-lived as the locomotive was stopped after only one trip, and placed back into storage.

== Preservation ==
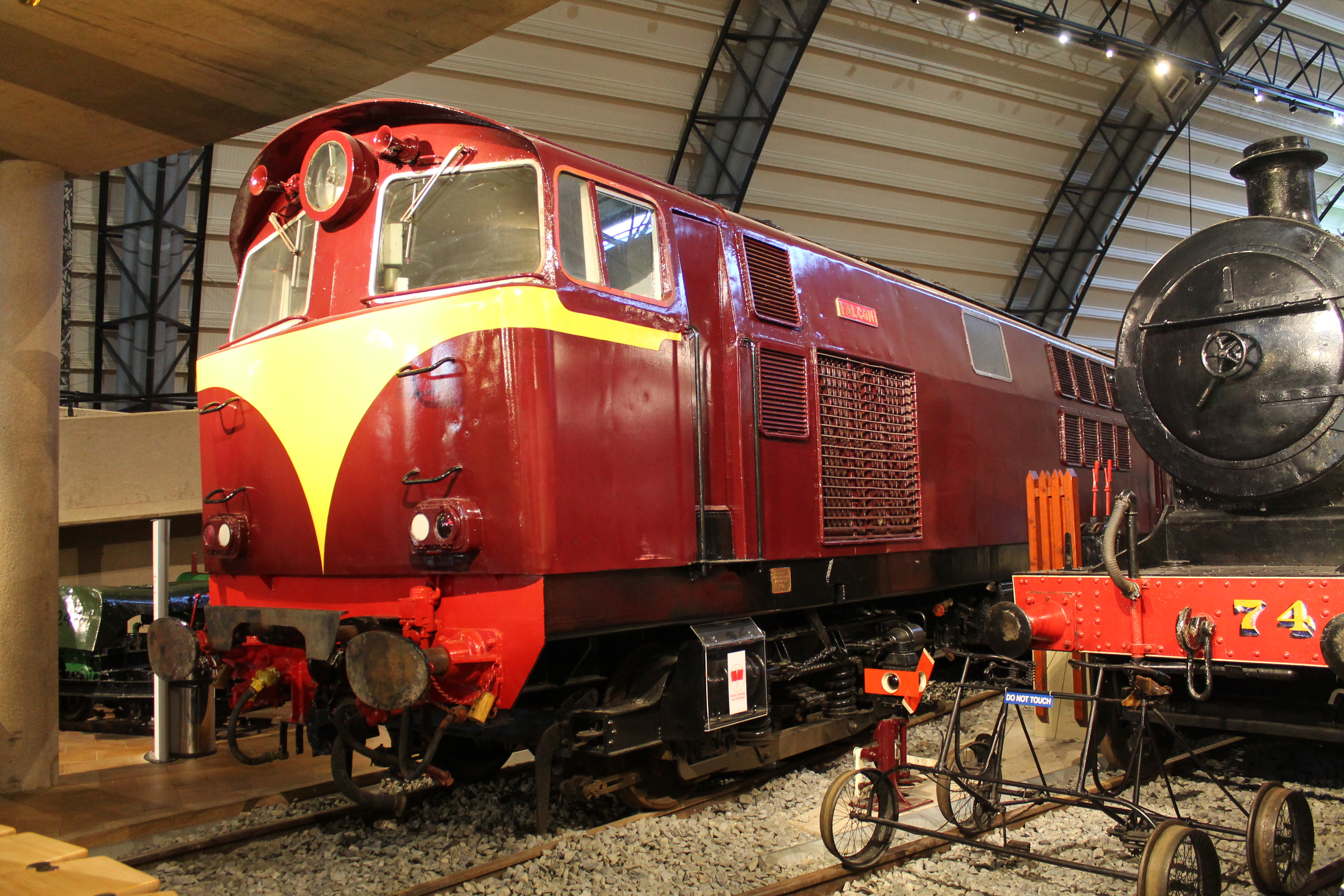
102 on display at the Ulster Folk & Transport Museum

In 2005 two locomotives, 101 and 102, were bought by the Railway Preservation Society of Ireland (RPSI) after their withdrawal. Both were inoperable and already located at the RPSI's site in Whitehead, County Antrim. Locomotive 102 was selected for restoration to working order, with 101 to be cannibalised for spare parts. However, the attempt to restore 102 did not occur because of a series of external issues, and the locomotive was left in storage in the Whitehead sidings. In 2009 a second attempt was made to restore 102 to working order but the plan was eventually mothballed and so the locomotive was returned to long-term storage.

In January 2012, 102 was transferred to the Ulster Folk and Transport Museums after being cosmetically restored and repainted into its original maroon livery. Locomotive 101 was scrapped in 2010 after any useful parts for use on 102 were salvaged.

== Models ==
Accurascale are producing ready-to-run OO gauge models of the locomotives.
