= GNRI Class S =

GNR(I) classes S and S2
- 171 Slieve Gullion on a Railway Preservation Society of Ireland excursion at Dundalk in 2026
Type and origin
- Power type: Steam
- Builder: Beyer, Peacock & Company
- Build date: S: 1913; S2: 1915
- Total produced: S: 5 S2: 3
Specifications
- Configuration
  - Whyte: 4-4-0
  - UIC: 2′B h2
- Gauge: 5 ft 3 in (1,600 mm)
- Driver dia.: 6 ft 7 in (2,007 mm)
- Cylinders: Two, inside
- Cylinder size: 19 in × 26 in (483 mm × 660 mm)
Career
- Operators: GNR(I) » CIÉ / UTA
- Numbers: S: 170–174; S2: 190–192
- Preserved: No. 171
- Disposition: One preserved, remainder scrapped

The Great Northern Railway (Ireland) class S was a class of five 4-4-0 steam locomotive that the Great Northern Railway introduced in 1913 to haul Belfast – Dublin express passenger trains. They were followed two years later by the three similar class S2 locomotives.

All were built by Beyer, Peacock & Company at its Gorton Foundry, Manchester.

== Fleet ==
Table of locomotives
Class	GNRI No.	Name	BP serial No.	Rebuilt	1958	Withdrawn	Notes
S	170	Errigal	5628	1939	CIÉ 170N	1965	
S	171	Slieve Gullion	5629	1938	CIÉ 171N	1965	Preserved
S	172	Slieve Donard	5630	1938	UTA 60	1965	
S	173	Galtee More	5631	1938	UTA 61	1964	
S	174	Carrantuohill	5632	1939	CIÉ 174N	1965	
S2	190	Lugnaquilla	5901	1939	UTA 62	1965	Named in 1939
S2	191	Croagh Patrick	5902	1939	CIÉ 191N	1960	Named in 1939
S2	192	Slievenamon	5903	1938	UTA 63	1965	Named in 1938

== Names ==
The locomotives were delivered during a time when the GNRI was removing names from locomotives. The S class locomotives carried names from new, but gradually lost them, so by 1925, only 170 Errigal retained its name. This it lost in 1930. The S2 locomotives were allocated the names Lugnaquilla, Carlingford, and Mount Hamilton, but they were never carried. With the introduction the class V locomotives in 1932, the GNRI revived the practice of naming locomotives; the S2 class acquired new names, and the S class regained their old ones as they went through the works for rebuilding in the late 1930s. All were named after mountains in Ireland.

== 1958 dispersal ==
Much of the GNR network was closed in 1957 and the remaining system was split between Córas Iompair Éireann (CIÉ) and the Ulster Transport Authority (UTA) in 1958, with the fleet divided as equally as possible between the two parties. The UTA renumbered their locomotives, whereas the CIÉ merely added an "N" suffix to the locomotives' former GNRI numbers.

CIÉ soon replaced its remaining steam locomotives with diesels and sold four of its former GNRI steam locomotives – all three S class and one VS class – to the UTA in 1963.

The UTA based some of its S class locomotives in Belfast and used it to haul trains on the Belfast – Portadown main line and Portadown – Derry "Derry Road".

== Preservation ==
One member of the class, No. 171 Slieve Gullion, is preserved. In preservation it has covered most of the Irish railway system, including many non-GNR(I) lines.

The locomotive was in service until 2002 when its boiler certificate expired. Growing Rural Opportunities Within (GROW) South Antrim is now funding the locomotive's restoration. In January 2014 the locomotive was transported to Railway Restoration North East Ltd in Shildon, County Durham, which began overhaul until they went insolvent. The locomotive was rescued and returned to Whitehead and put in store in 2015.

As of September 2019, overhaul has recommenced at Whitehead, with boiler being lifted in October, and wheels removed from frames at the same time to allow wheels to be reprofiled, axle box work, and further work on the motion.

It was intended for 171 to replace Class V No. 85 Merlin when its boiler ticket expired, and on July 27th 2024 171 was steamed for the first time since 2002, running back and forth at the platform at Whitehead to spread oil through its bearings.

Pictures of GNRI No. 171 in preservation
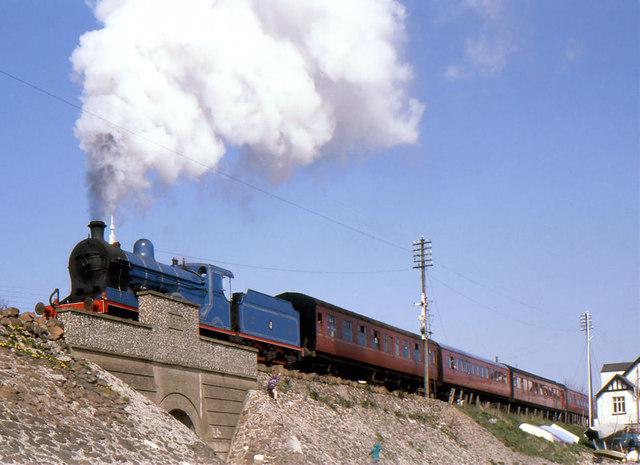
171 departing Whitehead Station in 1980

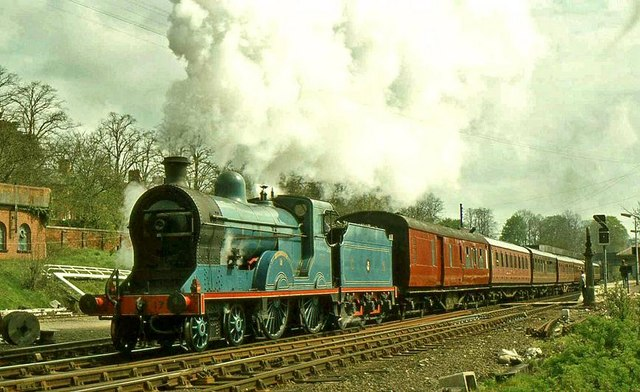
171 passing through Lisburn with an excursion train in 1985

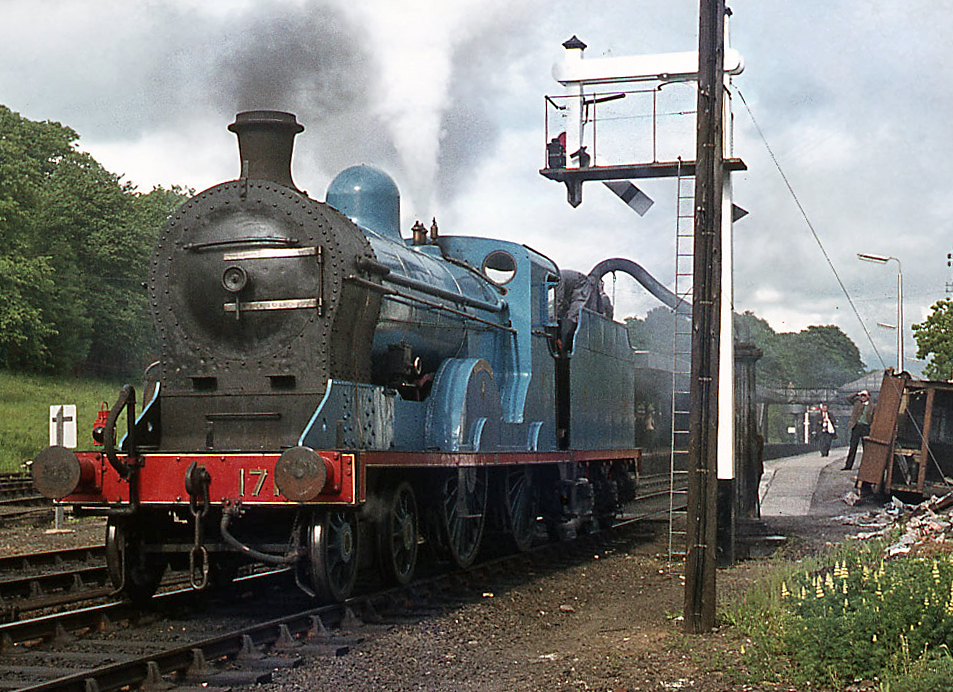
171 taking on water at Lisburn in 1973

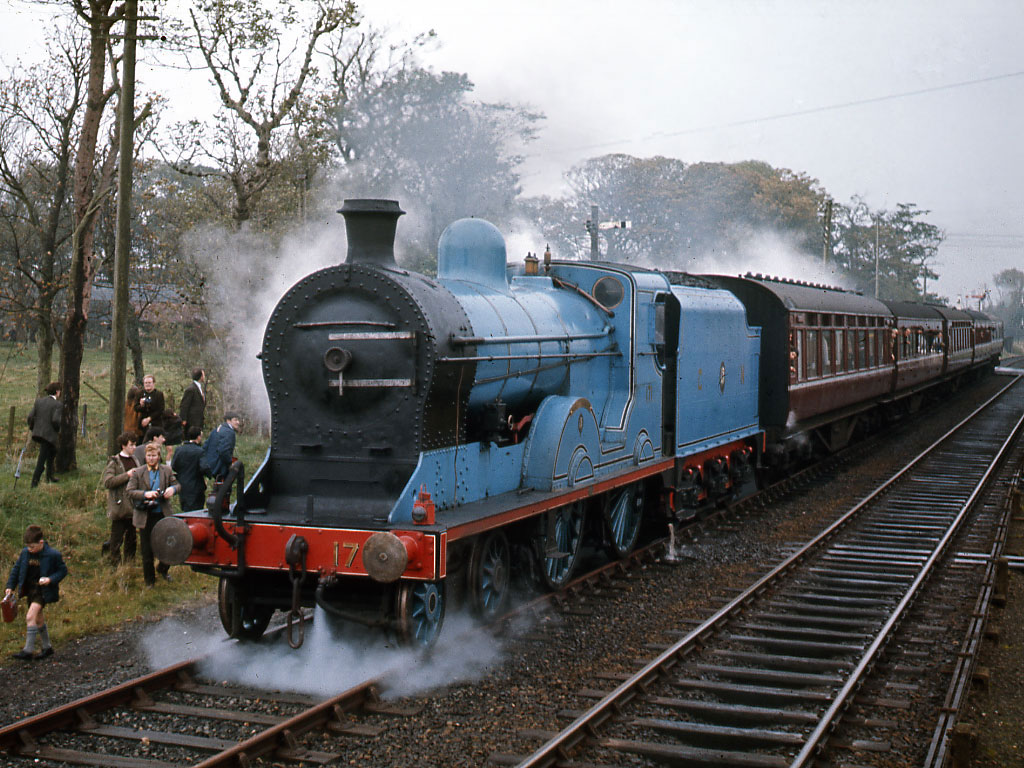
171 stopped at Bellarena on an excursion in 1970.

== Model ==
An 00 gauge model of the S Class is currently available as an etched-brass kit from Studio Scale Models. It includes transfers, brass etches and cast white metal parts.

== See also ==
- Steam locomotives of Ireland

== Sources and further reading ==
- Friel, Charles P (1995). Slieve Gullion. Colourpoint Transport. Vol. 4. Gortrush: Colourpoint Press. ISBN 1-898392-11-0.
- Rowledge, J. W. P. (1993). Irish Steam Locomotive Register. Stockport, Merseyside: Irish Traction Group. ISBN 0-947773-33-9.
