= LPHC No.3 R.H. Smyth =

Preserved Irish industrial 0-6-0ST locomotive

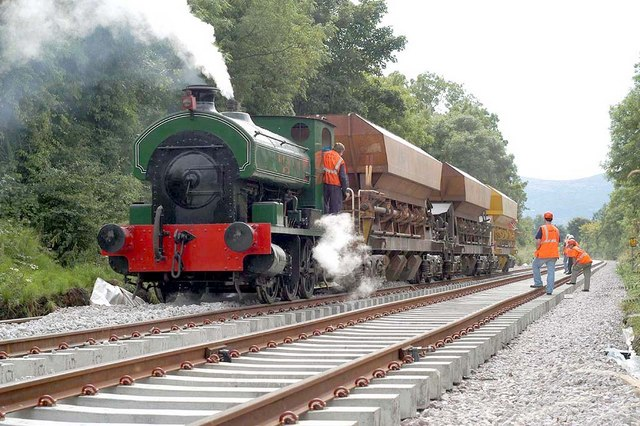
- RH Smyth dropping ballast near Jordanstown in August 2005
Type and origin
- Power type: Steam
- Builder: Avonside Engine Company
- Serial number: 2021
- Build date: 1928
Specifications
- Configuration
  - Whyte: 0-6-0ST
  - UIC: C n2
- Gauge: 5 ft 3 in (1,600 mm)
- Driver dia.: 3 ft 3 in (0.991 m)
- Cylinders: Two, outside
- Cylinder size: 14 in × 22 in (360 mm × 560 mm)
Career
- Operators: Londonderry Port and Harbour Commissioners
- Numbers: 3
- Withdrawn: 1962
- Current owner: Railway Preservation Society of Ireland

Londonderry Port and Harbour Commissioners (LPHC) No. 3 R H Smyth is a preserved Irish steam locomotive.

Built by Avonside Engineering Company of Bristol, England works No. 2021 in 1928. A fairly typical 0-6-0ST built to the 5 ft 3 in (1,600 mm) Irish broad gauge, it led a rather uneventful life shunting the dual gauge (5 ft 3 in and 3 ft) docks in Derry on the west bank of the River Foyle in Northern Ireland. It was equipped with a single off-centre buffer and coupling at each end for shunting 3 ft (914 mm) gauge stock, in addition to conventional buffers and drawhooks for 5 ft 3 in gauge. After withdrawal, it was bought privately in 1968 before being sold for £1 to the Railway Preservation Society of Ireland at Whitehead in 1972. The engine then acquired the nickname 'Harvey' in honour of showjumper Harvey Smith.

In 2000, 30 years after the end of mainline steam in Northern Ireland, No. 3 achieved something of a celebrity status when it was hired by Henry Boot Ltd to help engineering work on the relaying of the Bleach Green Junction - Antrim railway line. This was followed in 2005 by another contract assisting the relaying of the Carrickfergus - Whitehead railway line.

During 2006, the locomotive was placed on loan to the Downpatrick and County Down Railway In 2013 it was returned to Whitehead where it awaits Overhaul.
