= GNRI Class V =

Class of three-cylinder compound locomotives

Great Northern Railway (Ireland) Class V
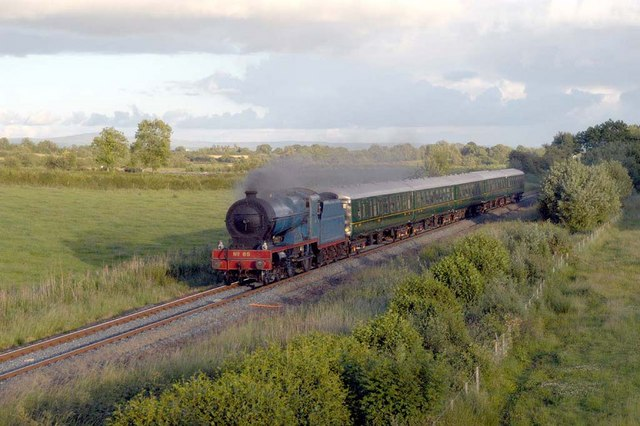
- 85 Merlin approaches Peter's Bridge, County Down on 18 June 2004
Type and origin
- Power type: steam
- Designer: George Glover
- Builder: Beyer, Peacock & Company
- Order number: 1524
- Serial number: 6731–6735
- Build date: 1932
- Total produced: 5
Specifications
- Configuration
  - Whyte: 4-4-0
  - UIC: 2′B h3v
- Gauge: 5 ft 3 in (1,600 mm)
- Driver dia.: 6 ft 7 in (2.007 m)
- Total weight: 103 long tons 11 cwt (232,000 lb or 105.2 t)
- Boiler pressure: 250 psi (1.72 MPa), later 215 psi (1.48 MPa)
- Cylinders: Three – 1 HP (inside) and 2 LP (outside)
- High-pressure cylinder: 17 1/4 in × 26 in (438 mm × 660 mm)
- Low-pressure cylinder: 19 in × 26 in (483 mm × 660 mm)
- Valve gear: Stephenson
Performance figures
- Tractive effort: 23,762 lbf (105.70 kN), later 20,435 lbf (90.90 kN)
Career
- Operators: Great Northern Railway (Ireland); Ulster Transport Authority; CIÉ
- Class: V
- Numbers: 83–87
- Nicknames: Pounders; Compounds
- Retired: 1959–1963
- Preserved: No. 85 Merlin
- Disposition: One preserved, four scrapped

The Great Northern Railway V class steam locomotives were 4-4-0 three-cylinder compound locomotives built in 1932 by Beyer, Peacock & Company for the Great Northern Railway (Ireland).

== Design ==
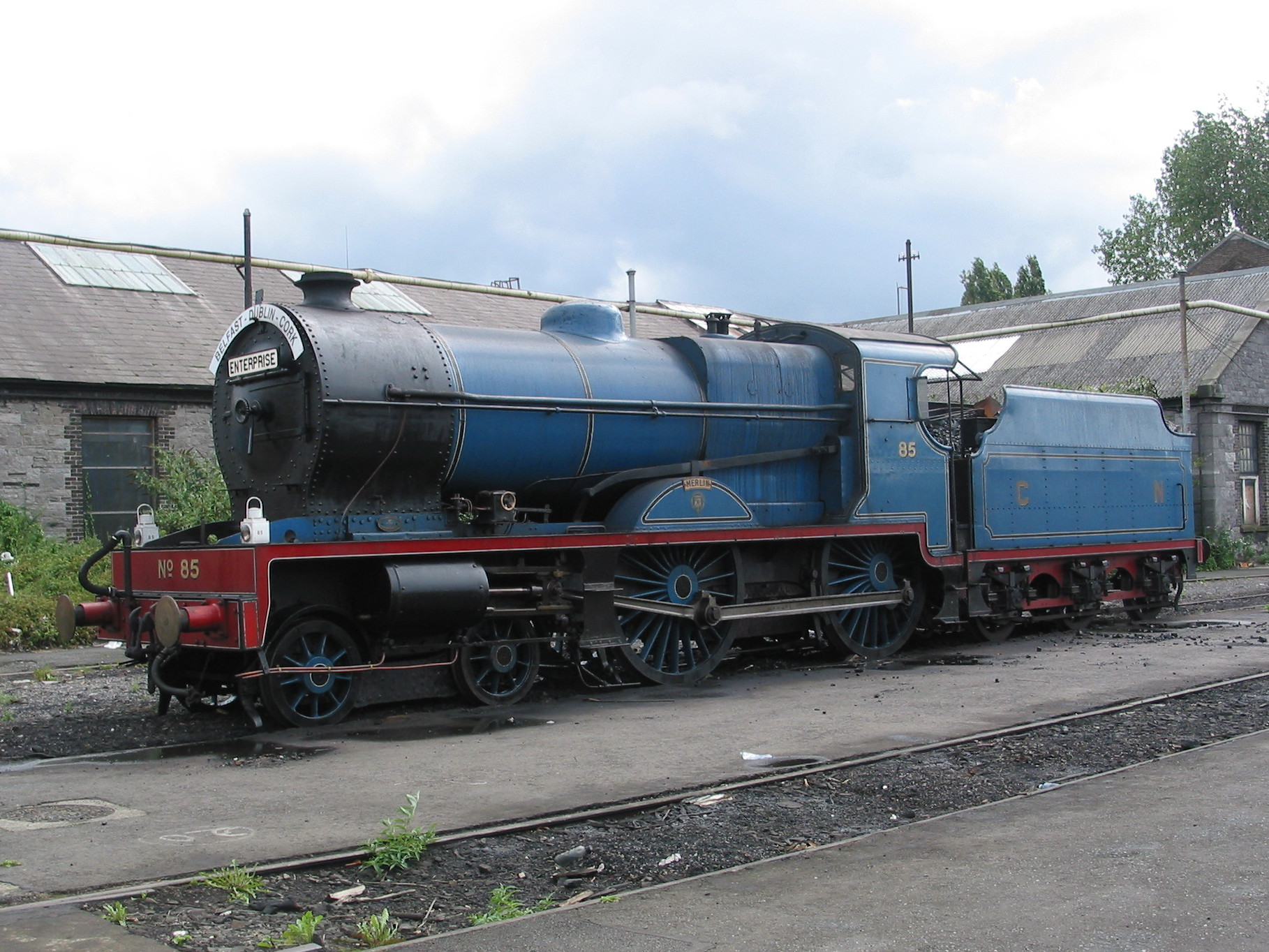
Merlin at Inchicore Railway Works

The V class was intended for the GNR's most important passenger service, the Dublin – Belfast expresses. The S and S2 Classes that had previously served the route were giving trouble as boiler pressure had been raised to increase power and performance. This increased maintenance (particularly with broken crank axles) and as a result the boiler pressure was brought back down, obliging the GNR to develop a more powerful engine.

George Glover designed the resultant 'V' class with on-site experience learnt from the design teams for the British LMS Compound 4-4-0 compound locomotives.

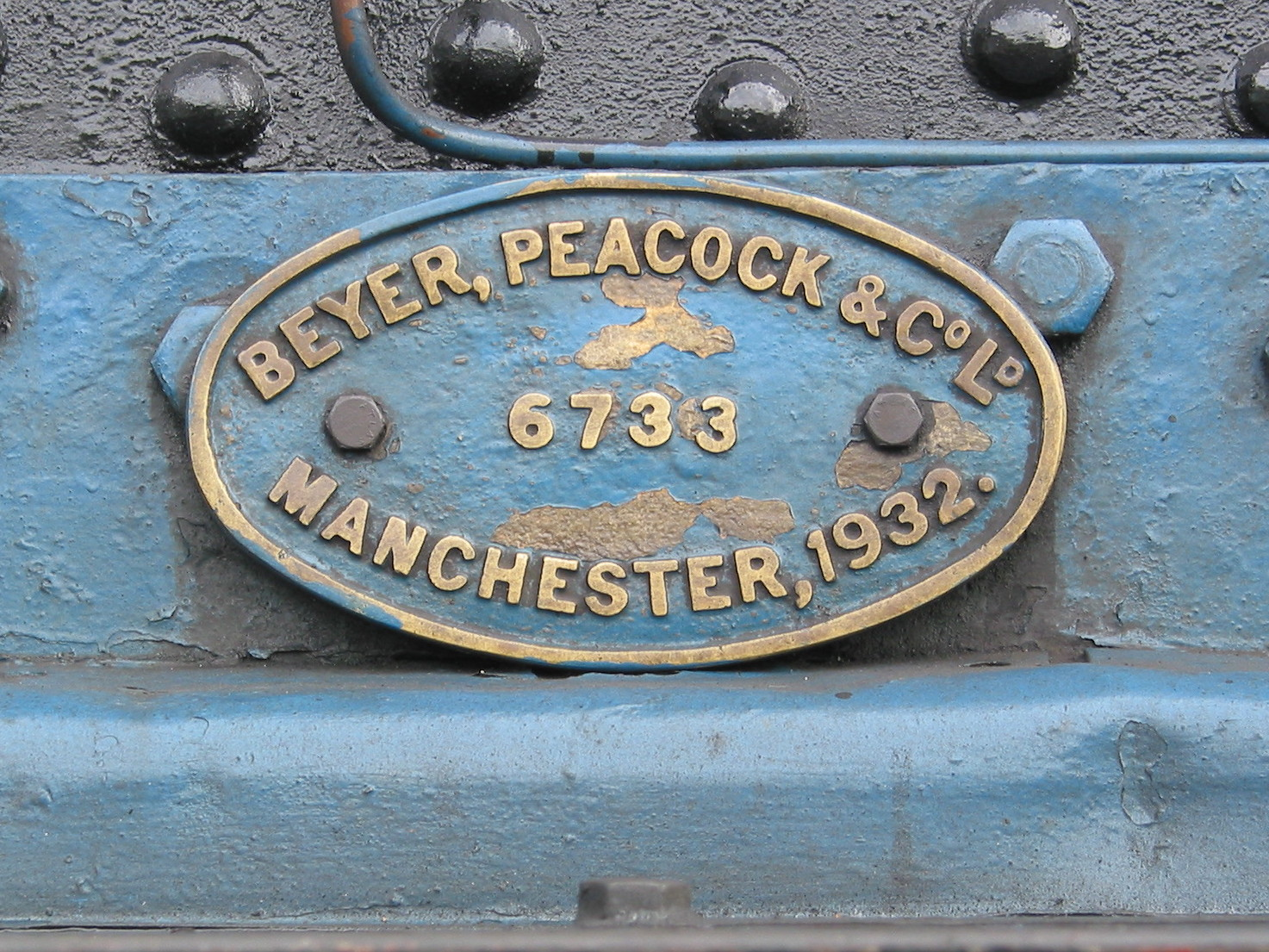
Merlin's builder's plate

The locomotives were ordered from Beyer, Peacock & Company and delivered in 1932. They cost £5,847, which was £3,000 less than the SG3 Class 0-6-0s built ten years before. Beyer, Peacock built only the locomotives; the GNR itself built the tenders at its works in Dundalk.

The GNR named the locomotives after birds of prey: 83 Eagle, 84 Falcon, 85 Merlin, 86 Peregrine, and 87 Kestrel. The V class were the first three-cylinder compound locomotives in Ireland. They had a round-topped firebox and Stephenson valve gear and weighed 103 long tons 11 cwt (232,000 lb or 105.2 t) including tender. The result was an engine that looked dramatically larger than their predecessor the S Class. This led to the unfounded rumour among railway workers that they had been designed for use in the USSR. As the GNR's only compound locomotives they were often called simply "The Compounds".

They were introduced for the accelerated Dublin – Belfast schedule, on which they reduced running times by up to 22 minutes. However, as for the S Class before them, the demanding timetable resulted in severe maintenance problems: hot axle boxes, connecting rod problems and boiler re-tubes. As a result, the boiler pressure was lowered by 50 psi (340 kPa), reducing tractive effort by 20%.

== Rebuild ==
No. 87 Kestrel was the first to be rebuilt in 1946 and was the first GNR loco to receive a Harland & Wolff-built square topped Belpaire firebox. Merlin had one fitted in 1950 with its old boiler rebuilt as a spare.

The V Class was chosen to haul the new Enterprise non-stop service between Dublin and Belfast in August 1947. The premium service was limited to seven bogie coaches. In the early 1950s the 'Pounders' shared most of the heavy main line work with the newer VS Class but, with the introduction of new British United Traction DMUs in 1957, the class was relieved of its main duties.

== Withdrawal from service ==
In October 1958 the former GNR, by then the Great Northern Railway Board or GNRB, was split between Northern Ireland's Ulster Transport Authority (UTA) and the Republic's CIÉ. Nos. 83, 86 and 87 went to the UTA and Nos. 84 and 85 to CIÉ. The letters 'UT' or 'CIE' were stencilled on the front buffer beams. CIÉ withdrew steam traction in 1963 and subsequently all but No. 85 Merlin were scrapped.

== Preservation ==
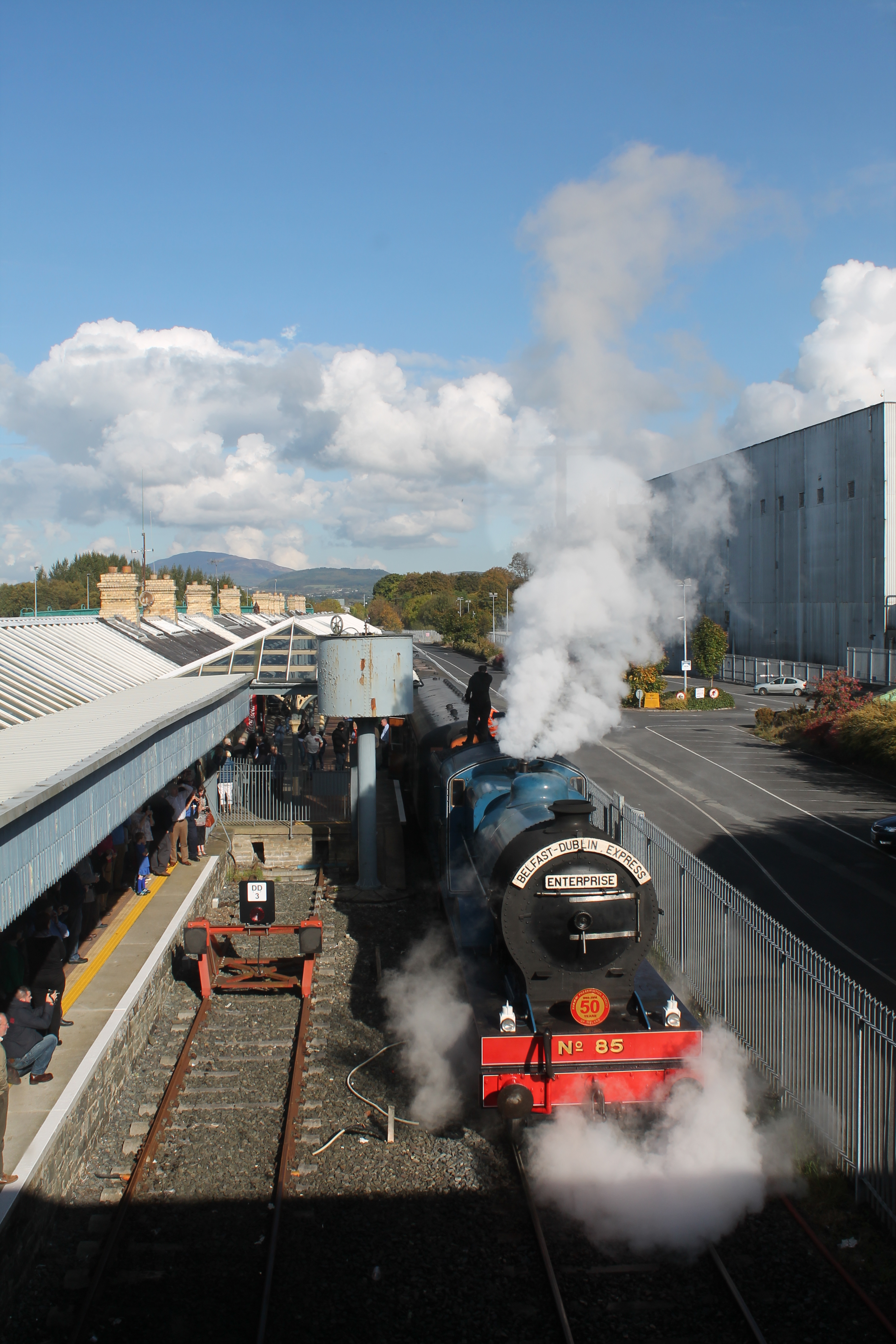
Merlin At Dundalk

Merlin spent its final years as a spare in Dundalk works, occasionally hauling a Dublin train. The Ulster Folk and Transport Museum rescued her from the scrapyard in 1965, acquiring it (minus tender) for £600. It was stored variously at Inchicore, Amiens Street, Dundalk, Adelaide locomotive shed in Belfast and Lisburn before finally moving to the museum's gallery at Witham Street, Belfast, in 1969. Displayed here until 1976, it was moved to Harland and Wolff for a comprehensive overhaul organised by the Museum, the Railway Preservation Society of Ireland (RPSI) and Lord Dunleath. On completion in 1982 it was moved to the RPSI's Whitehead headquarters.

Merlin was officially returned to traffic on 30 June 1986 heading an official Belfast – Dublin Enterprise that September. It repeated the trip on the 40th anniversary of the Enterprise the following August, hauling the same length train as in 1947 (seven bogie coaches) and matching the timings of the original run.

Having received a further overhaul in the 1990s, Merlin continued to be leased by the RPSI and used on the main line until its boiler certificate expired in 2004. The locomotive has been overhauled since 2009 and returned to service early in 2014.

Roster
No.	Name	1958 owner	1958 No.	Withdrawn	Notes
83	Eagle	UTA	83X	1960	
84	Falcon	CIÉ	—	1959	
85	Merlin	CIÉ	85N	1963	Preserved
86	Peregrine	UTA	86X	1961	
87	Kestrel	UTA	87X	1960	

== Model ==
An 00 gauge model of No. 85 Merlin is currently available as an etched-brass kit from Studio Scale Models. It includes transfers, brass etches and cast white metal parts.

== Sources and further reading ==
- Friel, Charles P (1995). Merlin. Colourpoint Transport. Vol. 2. Gortrush: Colourpoint Press. ISBN 1-898392-08-0.
- Kelly, Peter (1993). The Railway Enthusiasts Almanac. Eric Dobby Publishing. ISBN 978-1-85882-008-8.
