= Blackhead Lighthouse =

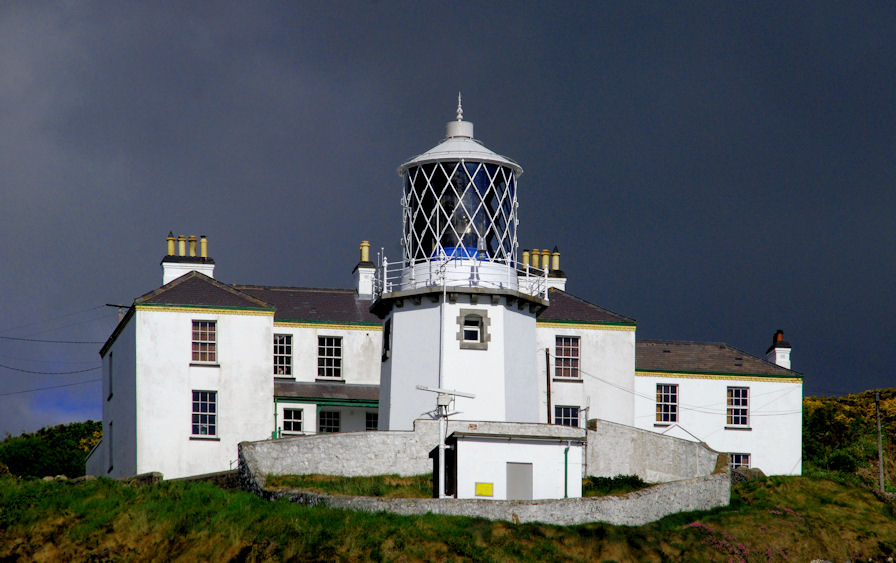
- Blackhead in 2010
- Location: County Antrim, Northern Ireland
- Coordinates: 54.76694°N 5.68917°W

Tower
- Constructed: 1902
- Automated: 1975
- Height: 16 metres (52 ft)
- Shape: octagonal
- Operator: Commissioners of Irish Lights
- Heritage: Grade B+ listed building
- Fog signal: discontinued in 1972

Light
- First lit: 1902
- Focal height: 45 metres (148 ft)
- Lens: 920mm catadioptric annular
- Light source: MBI 400W lamps in a UVLA lampchanger
- Range: 27 nautical miles (50 km; 31 mi)
- Characteristic: Fl W 3s.

Listed Building – Grade B+
- Designated: 22 June 2010
- Reference no.: HB22/05/005 A

Blackhead Lighthouse is a listed lighthouse built at the turn of the 20th century, near Whitehead in County Antrim, Northern Ireland. It marks the very northern end of Belfast Lough where it opens out into the North Channel that separates Northern Ireland and Scotland. The active lighthouse is managed by the Commissioners of Irish Lights, where it is named as the Blackhead Antrim Lighthouse to distinguish it from the more modern Blackhead lighthouse in County Clare.

== History ==
The first application for a lighthouse at Black Head was made by the Belfast Harbour Board in 1893. It was refused by the Commissioners of Irish Lights on the basis that the light would only benefit shipping entering Belfast and should not be financed by the general Mercantile Marine Fund. A second request was made in early 1898, this time supported by Lloyd's and the Belfast Chamber of Commerce as well as the Harbour Board, it was also refused. Further representations were made that year, including discussions in the House of Commons, until the Board of Trade and Trinity House agreed to make available funding to cover the estimated cost of £10,025 (equivalent to £1,410,555 as of 2023) for the construction of a lighthouse and fog signal.

The contract to construct the light was awarded to William Campbell and Sons in 1899 with work starting the same year. Designed by William Douglass engineer-in-chief to the CIL, the lighthouse was completed in 1902. Situated at the top of a steep cliff to guide ships into Belfast Lough and the port of Belfast, it complements the Mew Island Lighthouse on the southern side of the lough entrance, which was also designed by Douglass.

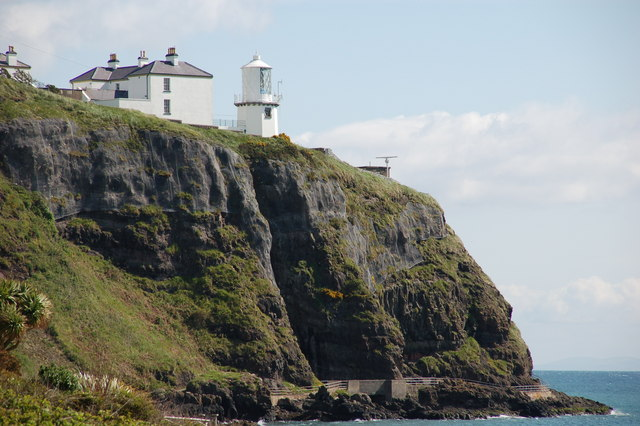
Clifftop location of the lighthouse

The lighthouse consists of an octagonal stone tower 16 metres (52 ft) high, with lantern and gallery painted white. The main two-storey keeper's house is built close by and linked to the tower by an enclosed walkway. There is also an adjacent detached superintendent's house. The lighthouse was electrified in 1965 and became automatic in 1975. The fog signal was suppressed in 1972.

With a focal height of 45 metres (148 ft) above the sea, the light from the first order Fresnel lens with its 400W bulb can be seen for 27 nautical miles, with a characteristic of a single white flash every 3 seconds.

Blackhead is one of the dozen lighthouses that make up the "Great Lighthouses of Ireland", a tourism initiative designed to promote the use of certain lighthouses for holiday accommodation. The keeper's houses at the lighthouse were refurbished by the Irish Landmark Trust, and are now offered as holiday accommodation. They retain the original whistle pipes that were used to call the off-duty keeper's to their watch duties.

== Coastal path ==
The lighthouse is accessible by a narrow private road (only accessible by foot for the general public) about 4 km north-east of Whitehead, and also by foot along the Blackhead Path from the town. This walkway was developed by Berkeley Deane Wise, to help attract tourists to the town, and loops around the headland requiring bridges and two tunnels. It was the precursor to the more dramatic Gobbins path, a few miles further north along the coast.

== Listed buildings ==
The entire lighthouse complex including the tower and keeper's houses is protected as a category B+ listed building.

== See also ==
- List of lighthouses in Ireland
