= GNRI Class VS =

Class of Irish 4-4-0 locomotives

Great Northern Railway (Ireland) class VS
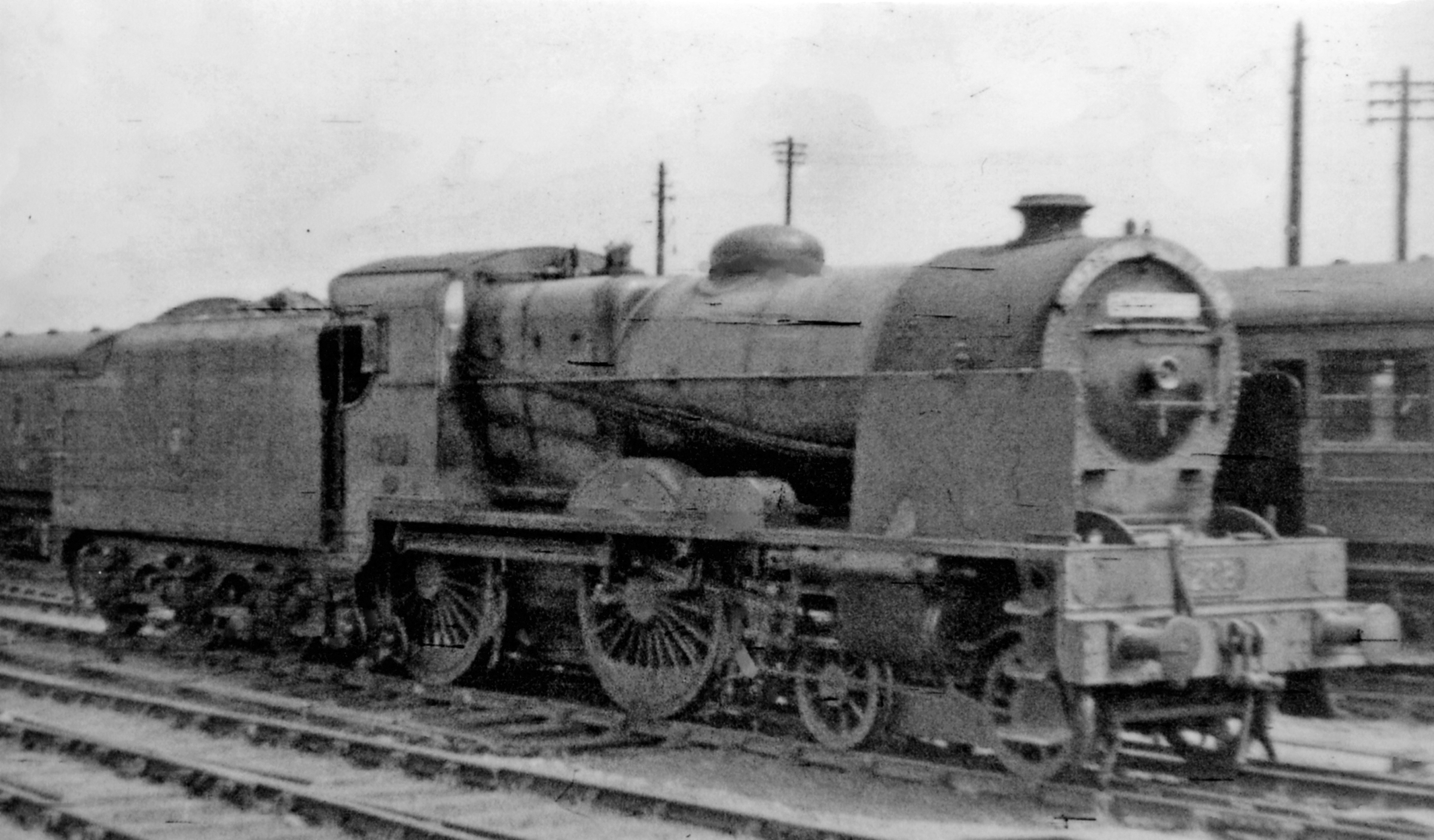
- No. 208 'Lagan'
Type and origin
- Power type: Steam
- Designer: Mcintosh
- Builder: Beyer, Peacock & Company
- Serial number: 6961–6965
- Build date: 1948
- Total produced: 5
Specifications
- Configuration
  - Whyte: 4-4-0
  - UIC: 2′B h3
- Gauge: 5 ft 3 in (1,600 mm)
- Driver dia.: 6 ft 7 in (2.007 m)
- Adhesive weight: 41 t
- Loco weight: 67 t
- Boiler pressure: 220 psi (1.52 MPa)
- Cylinders: 3
- Cylinder size: 15 1/4 in × 26 in (387 mm × 660 mm)
- Valve gear: Walschaert
Performance figures
- Tractive effort: 21,469 lbf (95.5 kN)
Career
- Operators: Great Northern Railway (Ireland); CIÉ; UTA
- Class: VS
- Numbers: 206-210
- Retired: 1965
- Disposition: Scrapped

The Great Northern Railway (Ireland) (GNRI) VS class steam locomotives were 4-4-0 three-cylinder simple expansion steam locomotives built in 1948 by Beyer, Peacock & Company. They were procured in order to operate the Enterprise train service between Dublin and Belfast and were the last series of steam engines ordered by the company.

== Design ==
The locomotives of class VS, designed by Mcintosh, were very similar to the compound locomotives of GNRI Class V, built in 1932 by Beyer, Peacock & Company. Unlike the latter, however, they had only simple expansion steam engines with Walschaerts valve gear. Their wheel arrangement was due to the restricted space in the Dundalk workshops. Class VS used the same Belpaire boilers as class V with an evaporation surface of 1,235 square feet (114.7 m^{2}) and a superheating surface of 295 square feet (27.4 m^{2}), and other parts were also interchangeable. The locomotives were equipped with smoke deflectors, rocking grates, hopper ashpans, and self-cleaning fireboxes with a grate area of 25 square feet (2.3 m^{2}), and were fitted with 4,000 imperial gallons (18 m^{3}) Stanier type tenders.

== Roster ==
Five locomotives of this type were built. Their works numbers were 6961 to 6965, their running numbers were 206 to 210. They were named after the rivers Liffey, Boyne, Lagan, Foyle, and Erne.

The VS class shared working the heaviest and fastest expresses on the Dublin to Belfast main line with Class V compounds; and were noted for use on the non-stop Enterprise express services.

In 1958 with the split up of the cross border GNRI Nos. 206, 207, and 209 went to CIÉ whilst acquiring a suffix of N. At the same time Nos. 208 and 210 became 58 and 59 under the Ulster Transport Authority (UTA). CIÉ sold No. 207N to the UTA in 1963 and utilised on both main line and suburban services from Belfast. All were withdrawn and scrapped by 1965.
