= Mount Hamilton =

Mount Hamilton may refer to:

== Antarctica ==
- Mount Hamilton (Antarctica), on the Kent Plateau
- Mount Hamilton (Tapley Mountains), in Antarctica

== Australia ==
- Mount Hamilton (South Australia), also known as Wabma Kadarbu
- Mount Hamilton (Victoria), a volcano in Victoria, Australia

== United States ==
- Mount Hamilton (California)
- Mount Hamilton (Nevada), in the White Pine Range

== Other uses ==
- Mount Hamilton (New Zealand), a mountain in the Southern Alps on South Island
- Mount Hamilton, County Antrim, a townland in County Antrim, Northern Ireland
