= Great Northern Railway (Ireland) =

Defunct railway company

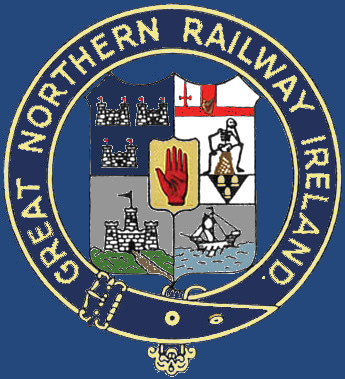
- Lines owned by GNR(I); Lines jointly owned with Northern Counties Committee (County Donegal Railways Joint Committee)

Overview
- Dates of operation: 1876–1958
- Predecessor: Irish North Western Railway; Northern Railway of Ireland; Ulster Railway
- Successor: Ulster Transport Authority (Northern Ireland); Córas Iompair Éireann (Republic of Ireland)

Technical
- Track gauge: 5 ft 3 in (1,600 mm)
- Length: 617 miles 13 chains (993.2 km) (1925)
- Track length: 926 miles 25 chains (1,490.8 km) (1925)

The Great Northern Railway (Ireland) (GNR(I), GNRI or simply GNR) was an Irish gauge (1,600 mm (5 ft 3 in)) railway company in Ireland. It was formed in 1876 by a merger of the Irish North Western Railway (INW), Northern Railway of Ireland, and Ulster Railway.

The governments of Ireland and Northern Ireland jointly nationalised the company in 1953, and the company was liquidated in 1958: assets were split on national lines between the Ulster Transport Authority and Córas Iompair Éireann.

== Foundation ==
The Ulster Railway, Dublin and Drogheda Railway (D&D) and Dublin and the Belfast Junction Railway (D&BJct) railways (which had the previous year merged into the Northern Railway of Ireland) together formed the main line between Dublin and Belfast, with the D&BJct completing the final section in 1852 to join the Ulster at Portadown. The GNRI's other main lines were between Derry and Dundalk and between Omagh and Portadown. The Portadown, Dungannon and Omagh Junction Railway together with the Londonderry and Enniskillen Railway enabled GNRI trains between Derry and Belfast to compete with the Belfast and Northern Counties Railway, and both this and the Dundalk route gave connections between Derry and Dublin. These main lines supported the development of an extensive branch network serving the southwest half of Ulster and northern counties of Leinster. The GNRI became Ireland's most prosperous railway company and second largest railway network.

In its early years the GNRI closely imitated the image of its English namesake, adopting an apple green livery for its steam locomotives and a varnished teak finish for its passenger coaches. The company later adopted a pale blue livery for locomotives (from 1932), with the frames and running gear picked out in scarlet. Passenger vehicles were painted brown, instead of varnished. On 12 June 1889, a significant rail accident occurred when a passenger train stalled between Armagh and Newry. The train was divided, but during the uncoupling operation ten carriages ran away and collided with another passenger train. A total of 80 people were killed and 260 were injured in what was then the deadliest railway accident to have occurred in Europe. The accident remains the deadliest ever to have occurred in Ireland.

== Growth and partition ==
In the early 20th century increasing traffic led the GNRI to consider introducing larger locomotives. The Great Southern & Western Railway had introduced express passenger locomotives with a 4-6-0 wheel arrangement, and the GNRI wished to do the same. However, the lifting shop in the GNRI Dundalk works was too short to build or overhaul a 4-6-0, so the company persisted with 4-4-0 locomotives for even the heaviest and fastest passenger trains. This led to the GNRI to order a very modern and powerful class of 4-4-0's, the Class V three cylinder compound locomotives built by Beyer, Peacock & Company in 1932.

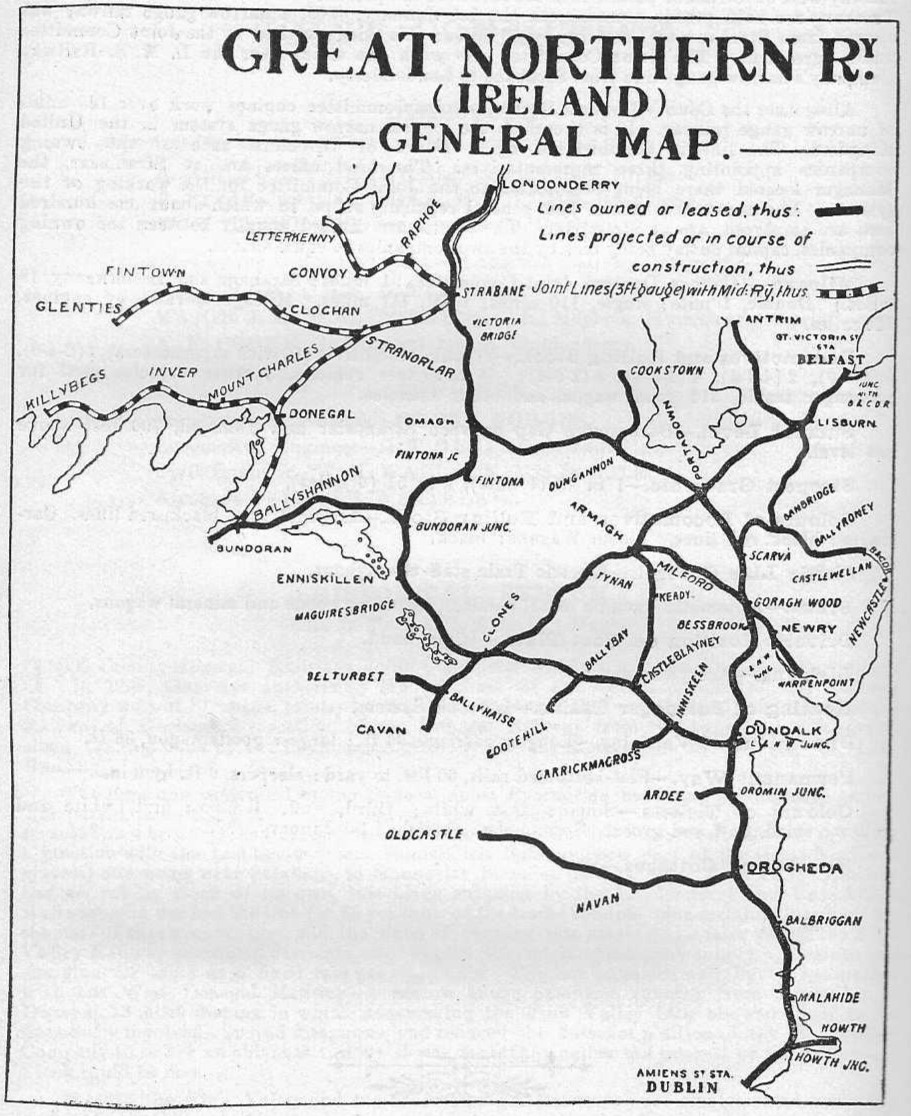
1926 map of GNR(I)

The Partition of Ireland in 1921 created a border through the GNRI's territory. The new border crossed all four of its main lines and some of its secondary lines. The imposition of border controls caused some service disruption, with main line trains having to stop at both Dundalk and Goraghwood stations. This was not eased until 1947 when customs and immigration facilities for Dublin–Belfast expresses were opened at Dublin Amiens Street and Belfast Great Victoria Street stations.

== Nationalisation and division ==
A combination of the increasing road competition facing all railways and a change in patterns of economic activity caused by the partition reduced the GNRI's prosperity. The company modernised and reduced its costs by introducing modern diesel multiple units on an increasing number of services in the 1940s and 1950s and by making Dublin–Belfast expresses non-stop from 1947. In Dundalk at the GNRI works, the railway engineers developed railbuses for use on sections of the rural network.

Nevertheless, by 1947 the GNRI had ceased to be profitable and in late 1950, the situation had become so bad that the company's shareholders authorised the board to close the entire railway. This forced the Irish and Northern Irish governments into action and they soon started negotiating a buy-out. An agreement was reached for a purchase price of £4.5 million (split evenly between the two governments) as well as the financing of all debt incurred before the deal was finalised. This happened on 1 September 1953 after the passage of legislation in both jurisdictions. The new entity was named the Great Northern Railway Board (GNRB) and was run jointly, with half of the board's 10 members appointed by each government.

The new Board's main task was to improve the finances of the railway. The first step was to replace the outdated and worn-out rolling stock. An order for railcars was soon placed, however an order for diesel locomotives was never sanctioned by the governments, leading to increasing frustration from the Board as the matter dragged out. A railcar maintenance depot was opened in Fairview in 1958 to service the new fleet. The other key step was to close uneconomic lines, so on 1 May 1955 all services were ended on the Scarva–Banbridge, Banbridge–Castlewellen and Goraghwood–Markethill lines. Additionally, passenger services were ended on the Cookstown branch on 16 January 1956 and on 30 April of the same year, the Knockmore Junction–Banbridge line was closed.

More widespread closures were proposed unilaterally by the Northern Ireland minister of commerce, Daniel Dixson in 1956. He wanted three lines to be closed on the Northern Ireland side up to the frontier: Omagh–Newtownbutler (including the Fintona horse tram), Portadown–Tynan and Bundoran Junction–Belleek. Not only were these closures not supported by his southern counterpart or the Board, but they would have also forced closures on the other side of the border, as the remaining stubs of lines would no longer be viable. In response to these plans, statutory tribunals were held in each jurisdiction. The evidence given by stakeholders was overwhelmingly against the closures, and notably Dixson did not given any evidence, nor did anyone present his views on his behalf. The two tribunals had completely different findings. The southern one recommended that the lines remain open, while the northern one said they should be closed. The Northern Ireland government felt the matter decided, and so the lines were closed on 30 September 1957. Within a few weeks, passenger services on the corresponding lines on the other side of the border had also ceased (Dundalk–Clones, Cavan–Glaslough and the Belturbet branch). In all, almost 200 miles (320 km) of railway had been decimated, leaving large areas of the county without access to trains.

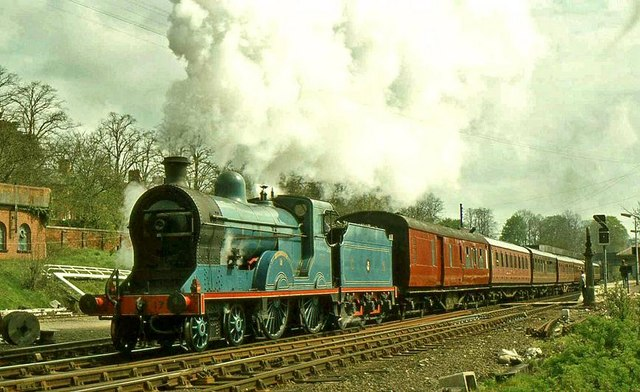
Preserved GNRI Class S no. 171 Slieve Gullion at Lisburn

In June 1957, Dixson announced he intended to end the joint ownership arrangement and it was agreed that the organisation would be split and merged into the two jurisdictions' nationalised transport companies: The Ulster Transport Authority (UTA) and Córas Iompair Éireann (CIÉ). One of the final acts of the company was to end passenger services on the Oldcastle branch on 12 April 1958. On 1 October, the railways lines were split at the border and all other assets were divided, with the exception of Dundalk works, which was spun off as its own company. The entity itself remained as a holding company for the County Donegal Railways Joint Committee as it had half-ownership of it and could not be dissolved until that company's winding up had been completed. This finally happened in 1981. All classes of locomotive and rolling stock were divided equally between the two new owners. Most classes of GNRI locomotive had been built in small classes, so this division left both railways with an operational and maintenance difficulty of many different designs all in small numbers.

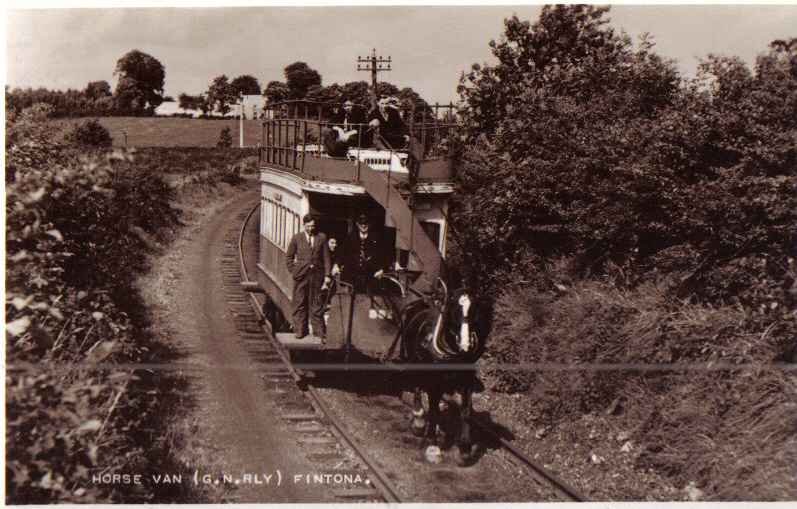
The Fintona horse tram circa 1930

After the split, further closures were carried out and today the only remaining lines of the former company are Belfast–Dublin, the Howth Branch, Drogheda–Navan and Lisburn–Antrim, of which only the first two have passenger services.

== Preservation ==
=== Rolling stock ===
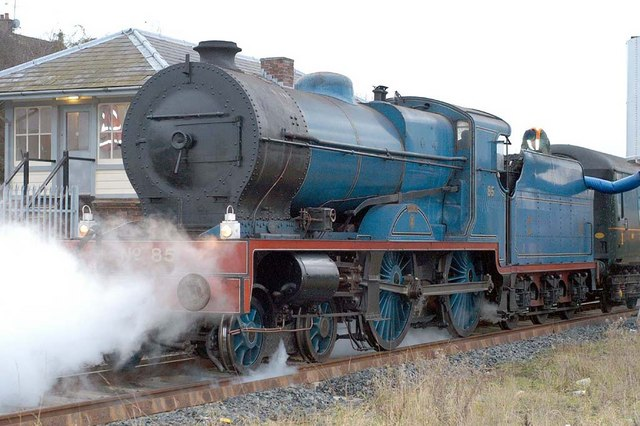
No.85 taking on water on the former Northern Counties Committee line at Ballymena railway station.

Four GNRI steam locomotives are preserved. The Railway Preservation Society of Ireland at Whitehead owns two of its 4-4-0s (one each of classes S and Q) and has custodianship of a third 4-4-0, (V Class) which is on loan from the Ulster Folk and Transport Museum at Cultra. The RPSI periodically operates one or more of them on special excursion trains on Northern Ireland Railways and Iarnród Éireann (successor to CIÉ) routes. A 2-4-2T (JT Class) locomotive is preserved at the Ulster Folk and Transport Museum at Cultra.

Some of its coaching stock has also been preserved. 1938 built dining car No.88 still sees use as part of the Railway Preservation Society of Ireland's Dublin-based "heritage set" of coaches. Also operating in this set is a 1954 built brake coach No.9, although it currently carries the number 1949. The Downpatrick and County Down Railway also has an example of a third-class GNR six-wheeled carriage, in an unrestored condition.

- Steam locomotives: V Class No. 85 (RPSI), JT Class No. 93 (UFTM), S Class No. 171 (RPSI), Q Class No. 131 (RPSI)
- Tenders: No. 31 (RPSI), No. 43 (RPSI)
- Carriages: Directors Saloon No. 50 (RPSI), Dining Car No. 88 (RPSI), Open Third No. 114 (RPSI), Open Third No. 1949 (RPSI), Unidentified 6-Wheeler (DCDR)
- Wagons: Brake Van No. 81 (RPSI), Grain Vans No.'s 504 & 2518 (RPSI), Parcel Van No. 788 (RPSI), Crane No. 3169 (RPSI), Ballast Wagon No. 8112N (RPSI), Unidentified Open Wagon (RPSI), Unnumbered Boiler Wagon (RPSI)
- Rail-bus: E (UFTM)
- Trams: Howth No. 2 (UFTM), Howth No. 4 (OERM), Howth No. 9 (NTMI), Howth No. 10 (NTM), Fintona No. 381 + trailer (UFTM)
- Road vehicles: Lorry No. 150 (NTMI), Bus No. 274 (NTMI), Bus No. 345 (C&L - converted to rail coach), Bus No. 389 (C&L), Bus No. 390 (NTMI), Bus No. 427 (NTMI), Bus No. 438 (NTMI)

=== Buildings ===
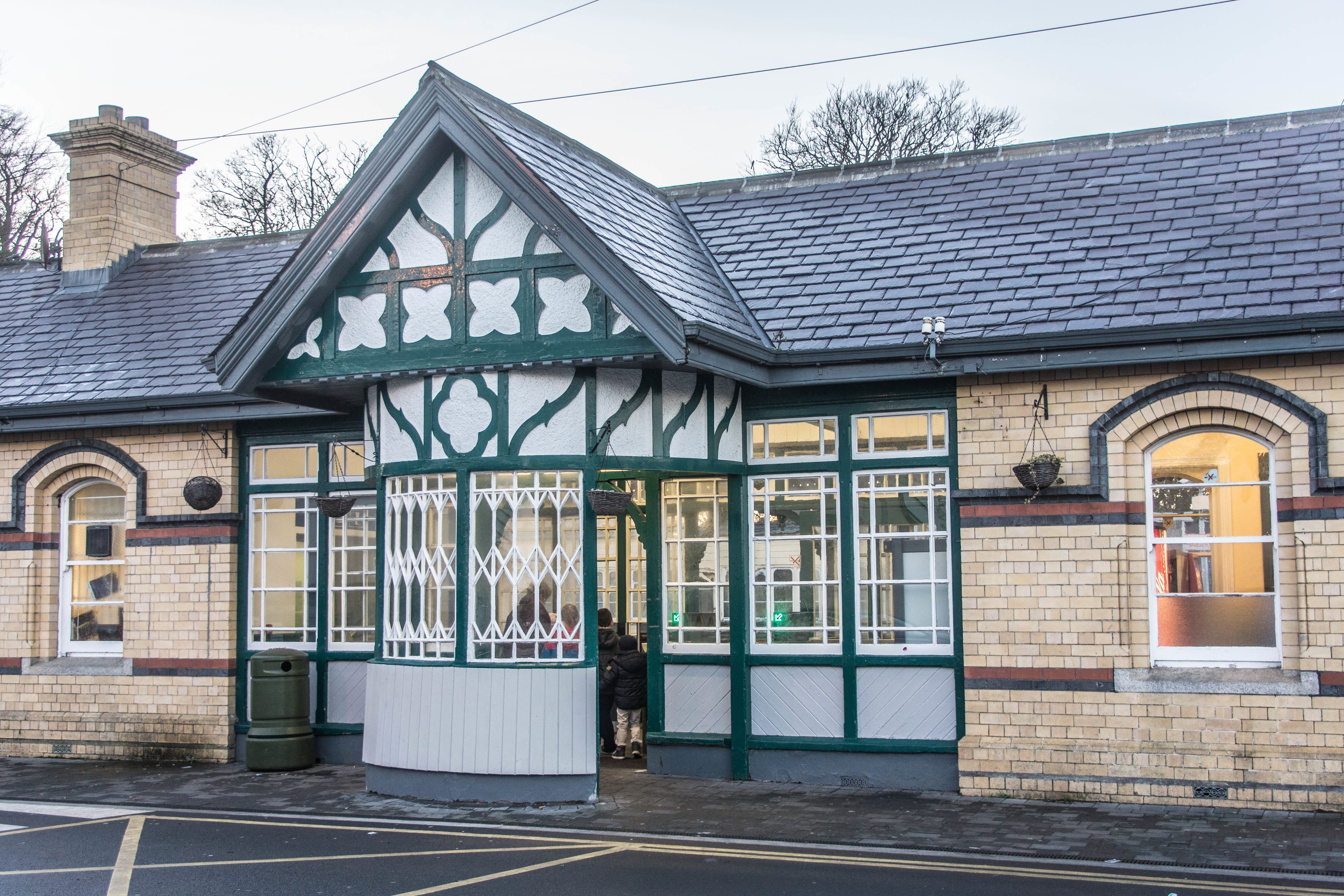
Malahide station illustrates the Polychrome brickwork style adopted by civil engineer Mills

There are a number of historic buildings built by the GNRI such as Lisburn and Dundalk. In 2011, a former GNRI Signal Cabin from Bundoran Junction arrived at the Downpatrick and County Down Railway. The cabin was installed on the platform at Downpatrick railway station in October 2015, where it is to be restored to working order. Other now disused stations are of architectural interest as are the early 20th century concrete structures at the 1910 Tassagh Viaduct and the 1926 Clones Engine House.

== See also ==
- Charles Clifford, Locomotive Superintendent from 1895 to 1912.
- William Hemingway Mills, Chief Engineer from 1876.
