= Railway Preservation Society of Ireland =

Heritage rail society in Ireland

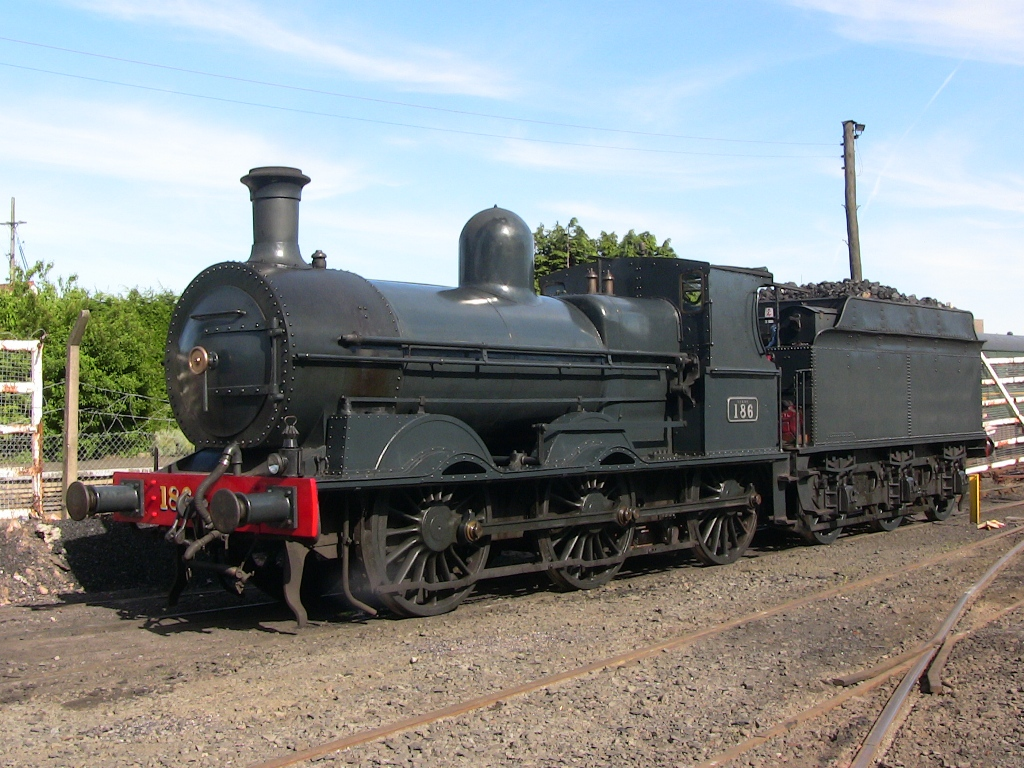
- The RPSI's oldest locomotive, No.186, a GS&WR Class 101, at Whitehead.
- Abbreviation: RPSI
- Formation: 1964
- Locations: Dublin; Whitehead, County Antrim
- Members: 951 (2021)
- Main organ: Five Foot Three
- Website: www.steamtrainsireland.com

The Railway Preservation Society of Ireland (RPSI) is a railway preservation group founded in 1964 and operating throughout Ireland. Mainline steam train railtours are operated from Dublin, while short train rides are operated up and down the platform at Whitehead, County Antrim, and as of 2023, the group sometimes operates mainline trains in Northern Ireland using hired-in NIR diesel trains from Belfast. The RPSI has bases in Dublin and Whitehead, with the latter having a museum. The society owns heritage wagons, carriages, steam engines, diesel locomotives and metal-bodied carriages suitable for mainline use.

== Bases ==
The Society has developed several bases over time, with Whitehead joined by Sallins, then Mullingar, and also Inchicore and Connolly in Dublin. As of 2019, three locations are in operation: Whitehead, Inchicore and Connolly.

=== Current operations ===
==== Whitehead site and museum ====
Whitehead, near Belfast, has a long history as an excursion station, and the RPSI developed a working steam and engineering depot there. This was added to by the development of a museum.

The Whitehead Railway Museum opened without ceremony in early 2017, after a 5-year project to expand the site from a depot to include a rebuilt Whitehouse Excursion station and the museum. The total cost was £3.1m from various funding sources. The museum received 10,000 visitors in 2017, its first year, and 15,000 in 2018. The museum contains five galleries and it is possible for visitors to see various heritage steam and diesel locomotives and observe work on railway carriage restoration. Guides from the society are present.

==== Dublin ====
In addition to its museum operation in Northern Ireland, RPSI operates mainline steam and diesel trains in the Republic of Ireland using their Cravens carriage set. As of October 2025, this is managed by the Rpsi Operations Ltd, a subsidiary company. Maintenance is carried out two sites in the Dublin area as follows:

===== Inchicore, Dublin =====
The RPSI has arrangements for storage of stock at Inchicore Works, with maintenance also being carried out there.

===== Connolly shed =====
In 2015 the RPSI secured an arrangement with Iarnród Éireann to lease the locomotive shed just to the north of Connolly for the maintenance and storage of mainline diesel locomotives.

=== Historical operations ===
==== Mullingar ====
The RPSI moved into the loco shed at Mullingar in 1974 and based steam locos 184 and 186 there. Carriages were also restored there. The base later become derelict, with funding instead being channeled to Whitehead, including a board decision not to spend money on the green carriages based at Mullingar. Generating Van 3173 was the last vehicle to be overhauled. The site was eventually handed back to the local council and Irish Rail, in preparation for new housing development, with some of the remaining carriages moved to other locations, including one to the Connemara Railway.

==== Sallins ====
Prior to Mullingar, Sallins Goods Shed was used as a base.

==== Whitehead and Belfast ====
The Society used to operate mainline steam trains from Whitehead and Belfast, with drivers and guards provided by Northern Irish Railways (NIR). These ceased from 2023, as the last qualified driver was no longer available, and NIR was no longer willing to carry the RPSI on their operating licence. It has been stated that this will not be issued until the Society can demonstrate that their arrangements for train drivers operating their rolling stock can meet the requirements of the Train Driving Licences and Certificates Regulations (Northern Ireland) 2010. In addition, issues in relation to RPSI’s interface management arrangements with other railway organisations and other statutory bodies were raised as needing to be addressed before a licence and certification could be issued. As of September 2025 the Northern Ireland Department for Infrastructure stated that documentation was still outstanding. Whitehead still operates within the yard on train rides while maintenance is still carried out on the mainline carriages and locos based here.

== Rolling stock ==
=== Steam locomotives ===
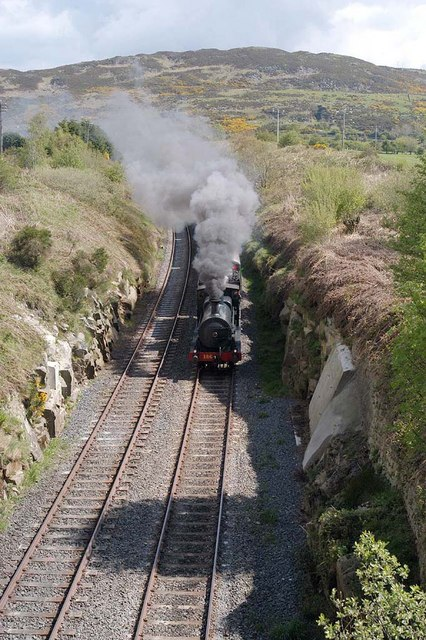
GSWR steam locomotive No.186 on former GNR tracks, near Newry.

The Society possesses 9 steam locomotives (plus one more operated by them but owned by the Ulster Folk and Transport Museum), of which, typically, only a small number will be operational at any one time. (Note: The RPSI was reported in 2019 to have begun work on a "new-build" locomotive project, choosing to commit to a Class W 2-6-0 in preference to a second 2-6-4T tank sister to No. 4. The Class W were the NCC's top express passenger locomotives built c.1933 and were noted for excellent performance. They were a parent design to the Class WT, which were essentially a tank variant.) In addition, as of 2019, the society was constructing a new-build W class mogul locomotive, No.105.

==== Passenger tender locomotives ====
The RPSI has three Great Northern Railway of Ireland 4-4-0's within its fleet. No. 131, a Q class, was built in 1901. The others are S class no. 171 Slieve Gullion and V class No. 85 Merlin, although the latter is owned by the Ulster Folk & Transport Museum and is on loan. These locomotives are suitable for longer distance main line work, but are speed restricted if they need to run tender-first in the event they cannot be turned.

==== Mixed large tank locomotive ====
The RPSI's Northern Counties Committee (NCC) 2-6-4T, WT class No. 4 holds significant records. It worked the last steam passenger train on Northern Ireland Railways, and with No. 53 operated the last stone goods train on 22 October 1970. Acquired by the RPSI in June 1971 it then went on to work over most of the remaining Irish railway network. They also own a SLNCR Lough class.

==== Goods tender locomotives ====
The Society possesses three goods tender locomotives all of which are suitable for slower speed passenger workings. Two of these are from the mixed traffic 101 (J15) class, of which over 100 were built between 1866 and 1903 and which lasted until the end of the steam era on CIÉ in 1963. The RPSI possesses two examples of these simple, reliable and robust engines, No. 184 with a saturated boiler and round-shaped firebox, and No. 186 with a superheated boiler and squarer Belpaire firebox. No. 461, a 2-6-0 DSER 15 and 16 Class heavy goods locomotive, is the only Dublin and South Eastern Railway example that has been preserved.

==== Shunting locomotives ====
Shunting locomotives are useful and economical for shunting and short passenger work within Whitehead yard. These include the 0-6-0ST .3 'R.H. Smyth', affectionally known as Harvey, which has also been used to pull ballast hoppers for NIR. There is also No3BG "Guinness", a Hudswell Clarke engine presented by Guinness to the Society in 1965.

=== Diesel and other locomotives ===
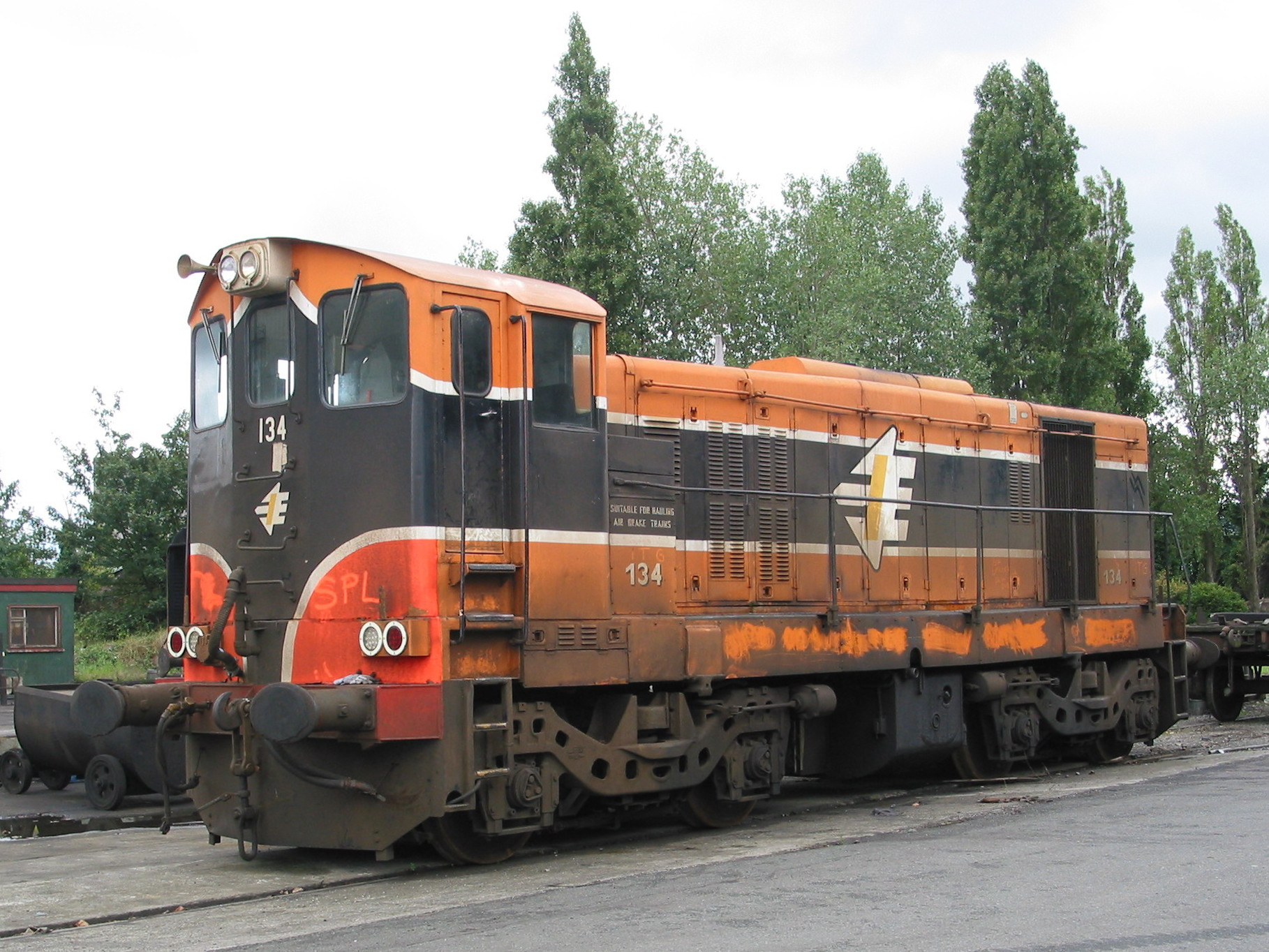
134 at Inchicore Works

The RPSI has indicated it has a strategy to create a mainline heritage diesel fleet. It has acquired seven c. 65t 1,000 horsepower (750 kW) General Motors Bo-Bos; CIÉ 121 Class number 134 and CIÉ 141 Class numbers 141, 142, 147, 171, 175 and 177.

The RPSI used to own two NIR 101 Class Hunslet diesels Numbered 101 and 102. They scrapped 101 and 102 was transferred to the Ulster Folk & Transport Museum.

The RPSI also has some small diesel shunters, including a Ruston from Carlow sugar factory, a planet diesel from Irish Shell and a unilok diesel from the UTA.

=== Carriages and other stock ===
In the 2000s, with more rail stringent regulations, the RPSI was forced to acquire rakes of metal bodied carriages for mainline railtours.

== Operations ==
=== Railtours ===
The main work of the society is in securing and maintaining steam rolling stock, with a view to running rail tours and Mulligan, in "One Hundred and Fifty Years of Irish Railways" noted that the RPSI did "sterling work" in the area of organising of such rail tours around the island, following the end of steam as a regular means of service provision on UTA and CIÉ lines.

=== Films ===
The RPSI has been able to assist in the provision of suitable rolling stock for train-related scenes in films made on the island of Ireland. The shooting of The First Great Train Robbery in 1978 was an early significant involvement in film making by the RPSI.

=== Publication ===
Five Foot Three is the RPSI's membership magazine. It is published annually

== Incidents ==
On 7 November 2014, an RPSI train chartered by Web Summit blocked a level crossing in Midleton for over 25 minutes. The operation was referred to the Commission for Railway Regulation. The resulting investigation found that the Society had knowingly run a train that was too long for the station's platform and that it would block a level crossing, yet senior IR management overrode their internal safety department by allowing the train to run.

On 7 July 2019, a serious incident occurred at Gorey when No.85 ran out of water and the fusible plug melted in the firebox. The Civil Defense had to cool down the boiler with hoses while the crew were evacuated from the cab and a rescue diesel summoned from Dublin.

== See also ==
- List of heritage railways in Northern Ireland
- List of heritage railways in the Republic of Ireland
- Irish Steam Preservation Society
- Irish Traction Group
