= Whitehead, County Antrim =

Coordinates: 54.757223°N 5.703964°W

Whitehead: Irish: An Ceann Bán; Scots: Whitheid
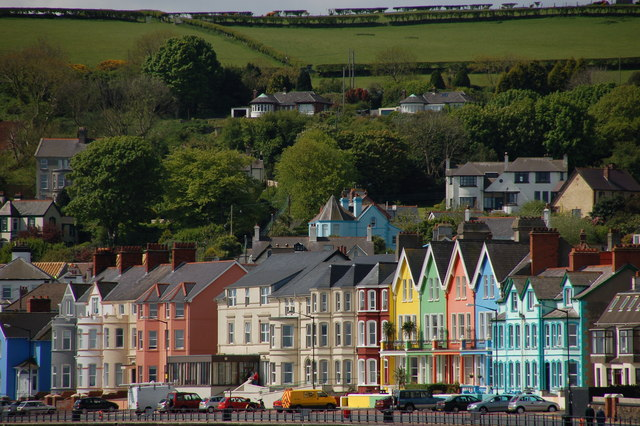
- The shorefront

- Location within Northern Ireland
- Population: 3,537 (2021 census)
- District: Mid and East Antrim
- County: County Antrim
- Country: Northern Ireland
- Sovereign state: United Kingdom
- Post town: CARRICKFERGUS
- Postcode district: BT38
- Dialling code: 028
- UK Parliament: East Antrim
- NI Assembly: East Antrim

Whitehead is a small seaside town on the east coast of County Antrim, Northern Ireland, lying almost midway between the towns of Carrickfergus and Larne. It lies within the civil parishes of Templecorran and Islandmagee and the historic barony of Belfast Lower, and is part of Mid and East Antrim Borough Council. Before the Plantation of Ulster its name was recorded as both Whitehead and Kinbaine (from Irish an Cionn Bán 'the white head').

Located at the base of Muldersleigh Hill, Whitehead lies in a small bay between the limestone cliffs of Whitehead and the black volcanic cliff of Blackhead, with the Blackhead Lighthouse on top, marking the entrance to the Belfast Lough. Whitehead is about 20 miles (32 km) from Belfast. On the opposite coast of Belfast Lough, the Copeland Islands, Bangor and part of the County Down coastline, are clearly visible.

Whitehead had a population of 3,537 in the 2021 census. Whitehead sometimes known as 'The Town With No Streets', as there are no roadways with the suffix "Street" in their name.

== History ==
In late Victorian and Edwardian times, Whitehead was a seaside holiday destination developed by and travelled from Belfast and the surrounding area each year. Whitehead is a Victorian railway village with a preserved conservation area, including the railway station. It is home to the Railway Preservation Society of Ireland, County Antrim Yacht Club and the Council owned Bentra Golf Course, as well as being the starting point for the Gobbins Path. The town also was home to an aerodrome during the First World War which housed two airships.

An Irish railway engineer called Berkeley Deane Wise took this tourism endeavour to the next level, creating innovative new paid-for attractions that would encourage visitors to use the railway company's services. Just south of Gobbins Path, Wise helped transform the small hamlet of Whitehead into a busy holiday resort. He designed and built a bandstand, ladies and gents bathing boxes, a 'children's corner', a slipway and a pavilion with 500 seats.

Whitehead received a silver at the Britain in Bloom awards in 2005 and 2006, and a bronze in 2007 with the local Brighter Whitehead group planting many of the flowers. In 2012, Northern Ireland's only Jubilee Wood was planted at Whitehead to celebrate the Diamond Jubilee of Queen Elizabeth II.

== Blackhead Coastal Path ==
The Blackhead Path was built by the Victorians in 1892, partly funded by the railway company, to attract day trippers and holiday makers to Whitehead which was at the time a growing tourist destination and resort. Wise also built a new path Blackhead Path along the coast from Whitehead to the lighthouse at Blackhead, overlooking the town, in 1892. To reach the lighthouse he added several bridges and a tunnel. Wise soon had plans for a much more elaborate path built on sheer cliffs a few miles to the north: The Gobbins Path was about to be born. This free accessible path is a seaside walk past Sunshine House, around Blackhead Lighthouse and along the Irish Sea cliffs of Islandmagee.

In 2018, the pathway was closed due to health and safety issues and a possibility of severe landslip. The Mid and East Antrim Council started a full renovation of the whole path in 2019. The path was reopened in July 2020. It was partly closed again 2021 after a landslip.

== Education ==
One primary school exists within the town - Whitehead Primary School. Another school, Lourdes Primary School, operated until June 2011.

Whitehead High School, an all-girls secondary school, was present until its closure in 1986. It is now the site of a nursing home.

== Churches ==
Churches in the area include Whitehead Baptist Church, Whitehead Presbyterian Church, St Patrick's Church of Ireland, Whitehead Methodist Church, Our Lady of Lourdes (Roman Catholic), and Whitehead Congregational Church.

== Sport ==
Sports clubs in Whitehead include a golf club, running club and bowling club. The latter, a lawn bowls club, were 6-time winners of NIBA Division 1, including in 2015.

Founded in 1976 local association football club, Whitehead Eagles FC, play in the Northern Amateur Football League having competed initially in the Larne and District League, winning the Larne Mineral Water Cup before progressing to the Dunmurray League where they achieved promotions in consecutive seasons and winning the Cyril Lord Shield .

County Antrim Yacht Club, based near Whitehead, offers dinghy sailing and RYA courses.

== People ==
- Neighbours actress Jackie Woodburne lived in Whitehead before her family emigrated to Australia.
- Sting (Gordon Sumner) lived & holidayed with ex-wife Frances Tomelty in Whitehead during the mid-1970s. The wooden house on the coastal path that they holidayed in was originally a temperance hotel and has recently been replaced with a new building. He was also known to have stayed on the top road to the lighthouse and Chester Ave.
- Keith Gillespie (Northern Ireland footballer) went to Whitehead Primary School.

== Railways ==
Whitehead railway station is on the Larne Harbour to Belfast Lanyon Place and Belfast Grand Central line. Located on the NI Railways network being part of the Belfast Suburban Rail as well as the home of the Railway Preservation Society of Ireland.

== Demography ==
Whitehead had a population of 3,802 people at the 2011 census, an increase of 2.7% on the 2001 census figure of 3,702. Of these:

- 17.8% were aged under 16 years and 22.2% were aged 65 and over
- 17.5% were from a Catholic background and 69.2% were from a Protestant or other Christian background
- 4.2% of people aged 16–74 were unemployed.

== See also ==
- List of localities in Northern Ireland by population
- List of villages in Northern Ireland
- List of towns in Northern Ireland

== Other Sources ==
- Whitehead Community Association
- Culture Northern Ireland
