= GS&WR Class 400 =

Express passenger 4-6-0 locomotive of Ireland 1916–1961

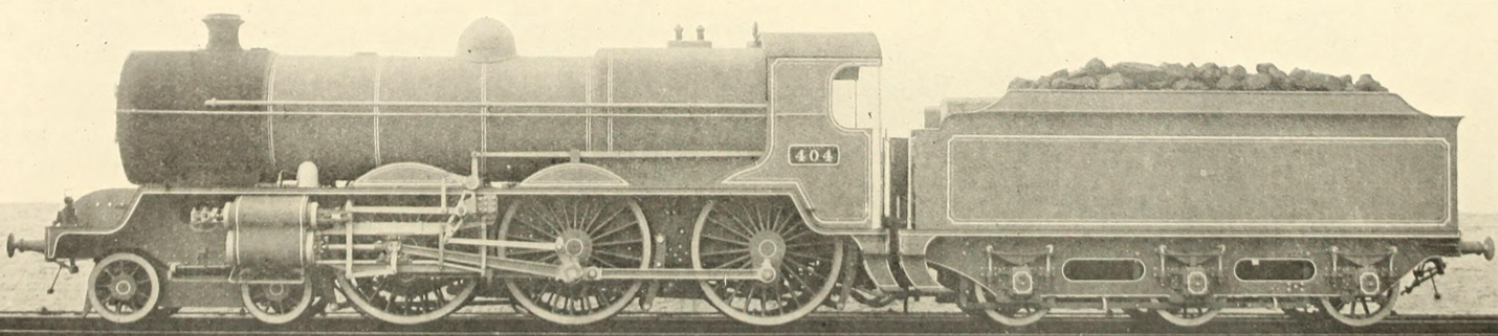
- No. 404 in photographic grey
Type and origin
- Power type: steam
- Designer: E. A. Watson
- Builder: Inchicore; Armstrong Whitworth
- Build date: 1916—1923
- Total produced: 10
Specifications
- Configuration
  - Whyte: 4-6-0
- Gauge: 1,600 mm (5 ft 3 in)
- Cylinders: 4 (as built); 2 (as rebuilt)
Career
- Operators: Great Southern & Western Railway
- Locale: Ireland
- Disposition: all scrapped
- Details for engine 400 as built.

The GS&WR 400 class or CIE class B2/B2a were a class of ten 4-6-0 steam locomotives built for the Great Southern & Western Railway (GS&WR) between 1916 and 1923 for express passenger duties on the Dublin to Cork main line. They proved initially unreliable but rebuilds from four to two cylinders between 1927 and 1937 for the seven survivors produced locomotives yielding satisfactory performance with the last two being withdrawn in 1961.

== History ==
=== Background ===
Edward A. Watson, a native of Clones, County Monaghan and joined the GS&WR in 1911 as Works Manager at Inchicore. His previous experience was with the Pennsylvania Railroad and subsequently the Great Western Railway (GWR) of Great Britain who employed him for his experience of American methods. In 1913 he was appointed Locomotive Superintendent, his predecessor Richard Maunsell having left for the South Eastern & Chatham Railway. The GS&WR main line ran between the two principal cities of Southern Ireland, Dublin and Cork, with the Up and Down Mail being the flagship service of the GS&WR. By 1916 these services were assigned to the 4-4-0's of Robert Coey's 321 class and the more powerful prototype No. 341 Sir William Goulding introduced by Maunsell. While the performance of No. 341 was very satisfactory the civil engineering department were concerned about its weight. Watson determined to introduce an improved design for the Cork services to reduce double heading, minimize the axle load, and reduce hammer-blow.

=== Prototype ===
With Watson having come from the GWR at Swindon comparison of his prototype No. 400 with the GWR Star class are appropriate, with Watson having been lent drawings by the GWR. Both the Star and No. 400 had four cylinders with the inner cylinders positioned forward to drive the leading axles, however various other features did not match the GWR practice. The positioning of the inner cylinders meant frames needed to be cut away to accommodate the rear bogie wheels creating a weak spot. Whereas the Star Class frame plating was 1 1/8 inches (29 mm) thick those for No. 400 were 1 1/16 inches (27 mm); and together with less robust bolstering this led to increased frame flexing and steam pipes breaking on No. 400. The firebox had dimensions similar to that for the Class 368 rather than GWR practice, and the boiler pressure was 175 psi (1,207 kPa), a record for Inchicore but below the 225 psi (1,551 kPa) of the GWR Star. Clements and McMahon also commented the use of a short lap 1 1/4 inches (32 mm) on the piston valve as opposed to the 1.63 inches (41 mm) GWR dimension may not have been helpful, preference for short lap being held by chief designer Joynt. The reliability of No. 400 proved disappointing with high coal and water consumption and poor levels of reliability. No. 400 and its successors were the only 4 cylindered locomotives in Ireland.

=== Main batches ===
With delays due to shortages from World War I and issues relating to civil unrest no further locomotives were produced until 1921 when three improved examples were built at Inchicore. These attempted to correct the deficiencies of No. 400 with strengthened frames, improved steam pipe layout, superheater changes and Detroit three feed lubricators. This increased the maximum axle loading from 17 long tons 6 cwt (38,800 lb or 17.6 t) to 18 long tons 10 cwt (41,400 lb or 18.8 t). The cab design was also changed

These were followed by two further batches of three built and supplied by Armstrong Whitworth in 1922—3, again with further detail differences as well as a larger tender with 4,500 imp gal (20,000 L; 5,400 US gal) water capacity. The second of these batches were supplied with saturated boilers at a higher boiler pressure, the resultant locomotives unfortunately proving to have worse performance in practice and needing conversion to superheated boilers.

Despite improvements to these batches the class proved unreliable, though Oswald Nock compliments "Despite their other shortcomings no one could say that the Watson 4-6-0s were other than fast" and that they could work well even if given poor quality coal.

=== Rebuilding ===
Watson's replacement Bazin was left with the situation of its ten flagship locomotives being problematic, unreliable and costly to operate. Bazin is understood to have consulted with Maunsell who directed his chief designer Harry Holcroft to render advice and assistance to Bazin, who may also have received advice from his previous appointment at Doncaster Works. Bazin took the boiler from the 400 class and produced a two-cylinder 4-6-0 mixed traffic No. 500. No. 500 proved an immediately successful design and proved suitable for the Cork Mail trains despite not being optimised for express passenger work. The introduction of the Class 372 Woolwich Mogul in 1925 was a further demonstration of a design with greater power to the 400s but with better operating and reliability characteristics.

Inchicore and Bazin took widened responsibility for the amalgamated Great Southern Railways (GSR) in 1925 and resource was initially directed at consolidating the existing stock from the combined companies some of which was in a very run-down condition due the previous civil unrest. 1927 saw Bazin undertaking a near total rebuild of No. 402 as a two-cylinder locomotive, drawing on the experience of No. 500 and input from Holcroft. The rebuilt locomotive was a success though the rebuild was expensive with boiler and firebox the only major components being retained while frames and wheels were completely renewed, wheelbase lengthened, and a 500-type cab fitted.

With finances pressing and the global economic depression of 1929's decisions were made to scrap Nos. 341, 400, 404 (Note: In the event No. 404 was renumbered 409 to avoid scrapping while the newest locomotive No. 409 was renamed No. 404 and scrapped) and 408. Simultaneously in 1930 the Inchicore built engines No. 401 and No. 406 had extensive rebuilds similar to that done for No. 402 however Caprotti valve gear was fitted at the same time on these locomotives which were also classified B2a. This left six capable locomotives for major Dublin—Cork services from the 400 and 500 classes, nos. 401, 402, 406, 500, 501 and 502.

Walter H. Morton took the Chief Mechanical Engineer position in 1930 before promotion to General Manager 1932 and replacement by W. E. Harty. Under Harty the Armstrong Whitworth locomotives Nos. 403, 405 and 409 were rebuilt over 1934—5, though the rebuild was more economical and less comprehensive than the earlier rebuilds. Existing wheels were retained by use of new 19 1/2 inches (500 mm) cylinders with a shorter 26 inches (660 mm) piston stroke. As this meant the length from the leading driver axle was not increased by 6 inches (150 mm) as with the earlier rebuilds it was possible to modify the existing frames rather than a complete replacement as had been done on Nos. 401, 402 and 406. The resultant locomotives had a tractive effort of 19,100 lbf (84.96 kN) some 1,500 lbf (6.67 kN) less than the earlier rebuilds. No. 407 followed in 1938, the total period to complete the re-builds having been 11 years.

Following rebuild the majority had split footplates, none looked were completely alike to another. For example, No. 401 had a split footplate, while No. 402 had a flush footplate. No. 406 had a flush footplate a far as its cylinders, as the cylinders were higher than the rest of the footplate.

=== Service after rebuilding ===
The 400s proved far more reliable and economical after their rebuilding, and gave many good years of service to the GSR and CIÉ.

No. 402, the first of the rebuilds, is claimed by Clements and McMahon to have remained the favourite locomotive. (Note: No. 402 was fitted with Walschaerts whereas the other two B2a locomotives were fitted with Caprotti valve gear and this may have a factor) In particular No. 402 is recorded as having achieved an average speed of 67.5 miles per hour (108.6 km/h) a special non-stop run over the 165.3 miles (266.0 km) from Cork to Dublin Kingsbridge in March 1934 hauling a small 3 bogie coach load of 95 tons gross. The other B2a rebuilds, nos. 401 and 406 had Caprotti valve gear and may have been more economical than No. 402, however there some indications the different driving techniques to make optimal use of this variant were not always used.

By the late 1930s the train weights of Cork services were increasing. The 400s were requiring one or two pilot locomotives to provide assistance for the climb out of Cork. As a solution in 1939—40 the GSR introduced three new 800 class Queen locomotives to enable accelerated timings on the Cork Mail train. The 400s could only deputise and maintain these timings if the load was limited to 100 tons.

They mainly worked on the Dublin-Cork mainline, pulling expresses and heavy goods traffic, along with seasonal beet trains. In 1950, the Enterprise Express was extended to Cork, and these locomotives, along with the 800s, and possibly 500s, were entrusted with these runs. The introduction of the Metropolitan Vickers A class Diesels in 1955 displaced these locomotives from regular work on the principal expresses. No.401 and 402 were still in service in 1962, but all were scrapped by 1964.

== Fleet ==
Class 400 B2/B2a Fleet details
No.	Builder	Introduced	Superheated	2-Cylinder	Valve Gear	Withdrawn	Notes
400	Inchicore Works	1916	1916	-	Walschaerts	1929	
401	Inchicore	1921	1921	1930	Caprotti	1961	
402	Inchicore	1921	1921	1927	Walschaerts	1961	
403	Armstrong Whitworth	1923	1923	1934	Walschaerts	1958	
404 (409)	Armstrong Whitworth	1923	1923	1935	Walschaerts	1958	Took 409 to avoid withdrawal
405	Armstrong Whitworth	1923	1923	1934	Walschaerts	1955	
406	Inchicore	1921	1921	1930	Caprotti	1957	
407	Armstrong Whitworth	1923	1925	1938	Walschaerts	1955	
408	Armstrong Whitworth	1923	1924	-	Walschaerts	1930	
409 (404)	Armstrong Whitworth	1923	1924	-	Walschaerts	1930	Renumbered 404 before withdrawal/scrap

== Livery ==
No. 400 was introduced in the then GS&WR standard livery of dull or dark grey, (Note: The grey weathered quickly to be indistinguishable from black, and is sometimes referred to as battleship grey or slate grey) though was lined in red and white. (Note: An as built black and white image shows the smokebox painted apparently black with the body different colour but this is a pre-service publicity image in photographic friendly paints.) Photographs indicate a metal number plate carried on the cab sides and an orange painted number on the red front buffer beam. The grey livery continued until 1947 when the surviving locomotives began to be painted green and lined black and white in common with several other passenger classes, with the C.I.E. flying snail emblem generally on the tender and metal cabside numbers removed, with images existing of the front locomotive number removed from the buffer and placed as numbers over the smokebox. (Note: There is mention that one or two surviving locomotives were painted black in the final days of steam and if may be this could have happened to surviving 400 class examples.)

== Model ==
There is a detailed O Gauge model of engine 404 in the Fry model railway collection. It was originally built by Bassett-Lowke for the 1924 British Empire Exhibition.
