= GS&WR Class 351 =

Irish 20th century goods locomotive

GS&WR 351 Class
Type and origin
- Power type: Steam
- Designer: R Coey
- Builder: Inchicore
- Build date: 1903
- Total produced: 8
Specifications
- Configuration
  - Whyte: 0-6-0
- Gauge: 5 ft 3 in (1,600 mm)
- Driver dia.: 5 ft 1 3/4 in (1,568 mm)
- Length: 26 ft 9 3/4 in (8,172 mm)
- Axle load: 15.6 long tons (15.9 t)
- Loco weight: 43.8 long tons (44.5 t)
- Water cap.: 2,730 imp gal (12,400 L; 3,280 US gal)
- Boiler pressure: 160 lbf/in^{2} (1.10 MPa)
- Cylinders: 2
- Cylinder size: 18 in × 26 in (457 mm × 660 mm)
Performance figures
- Tractive effort: 18,560 lbf (82.56 kN) (249)
Career
- Operators: GS&WR; GSR; CIÉ
- Class: J9 (Inchicore)
- Number in class: 8
- Numbers: 351—354, 249—252
- Locale: Ireland
- Withdrawn: 1964
- Details for 351—354 as built

The Great Southern and Western Railway (GS&WR) Class 351 initially consisted of four 0-6-0 tender locomotives designed by Robert Coey for use on heavy freight trains on the main line. They were joined by four similar locomotives built in 1912 introduced by Richard Maunsell, these had detail differences such as larger cabs and higher running plates. They included an extended smokebox to which a Phoenix superheater was briefly trialed but abandoned. They were initially designated GS&WR Class 249 but were subsequently grouped into class 351.

Maunsell developed the type with eight engines of the GS&WR Class 257 in 1913 with the first application of superheated boilers with piston valves to the company.

== Design and rebuilds ==
The GS&WR Class 101 0-6-0 freight locomotive introduced in 1867 was a very capable design. Over 100 were built all the way through to 1902 and they were capable of handling 500 ton trains of about 45 wagons. (Note: Most trains were lighter than 500 tons at the start of the century) Their 12-ton maximum axle weight meant they could be used on almost all branch lines but did have the disadvantage that there could be problems of wheelslip in conditions of poor rail adhesion on the heaviest trains. Robert Coey, locomotive superintendent of the GS&WR believed that, with the increased 16 ton axle weight limit on a wider part of the network, it might have been possible to adapt the design to fit a larger boiler to give improved performance on heavier trains.

In the event, four members of the Class 351 design emerged in 1903 with a larger boiler and firebox, the former common with the Class 301 passenger locomotive in the interests of parts standardisation. The wheel diameter and styling was mostly common with the Class 101 but conventional dished smokebox door was fitted rather than the hitherto "double oven" type used by Inchicore. Cylinders were 18 by 26 inches (460 mm × 660 mm) and tractive effort 18,560 lbf (82.56 kN) with a 15.6 long tons (15.9 t) maximum axle load.

Coey determined to build an even more powerful goods engine and introduced the Class 355 0-6-0 in 1903 with the largest boiler to date. As introduced the design was unsuccessful but remedial work of conversion of the class to a 2-6-0 configuration by adding leading wheels in 1906 resolved the problem. The Class 368 was a 1909 development of the 355 with altered configuration of the length of wheelbase of the coupled wheels and a Belpaire firebox. The 2-6-0 designs kept below 16 ton axle limit allowing a wide range of operation. By 1909, the GS&WR had 11 locomotives of the 355/368 with a tractive effort of about 18,560 lbf (82.56 kN) that could cover a large part of the network and were outperforming the 4-6-0 Class 362 fast express goods introduced in 1905 which had stability and economy problems and were restricted to the Cork main line due to turntable length.

For unknown reasons, for four locomotives of the 249 class built in 1912 were based on the 351 class and the reverted to the use of a round-topped firebox. There was an attempt to use "Phoenix" type superheater in an elongated smokebox in two of the locomotives but this was removed relatively soon after introduction.

Richard Maunsell was promoted to Locomotive Superintendent on Coey's retirement and ordered two batches of four class 257 locomotives which were a development of the 249 class with Schmidt superheaters, (Note: the second batch actually used an Inchicore Maunsell/Hutchinson modification) and piston valves with a Belaire firebox. The final batch was actually introduced under Maunsell's successor E. A. Watson.

The locomotives of classes 249, 257 and 351 were to have various rebuilds and boiler switches throughout their lives to end of steam in Ireland in the 1950s and 60s, most notably with classes 249 and 351 acquiring superheated boilers and being commonly designated the 351/9 class, with the class 257 being designated J4.

== Service ==
The locomotives were particularly in demand for working goods and seasonal beet trains over the route to Rosslare Harbour. In 1948, the Class 248 were praised as efficient and capable goods locomotives also capable on secondary passenger services. The Class 351 were noted as less economical and this was down to their valve gear which was not as efficient as the piston valve on the class 351. Many lasted until the 1960s, with No. 261 being the last CIÉ steam locomotive in 1966, albeit only as a stationary boiler at Dublin Heuston.

== Fleet ==
Classes 351/257 J9/J4 Fleet details
No.	Type	Introduced	Designer	Rebuilds	Withdrawn	Notes
351	J9	1903	Coey	1930	1963	
352	J9	1903	Coey	1938, 1951	1955	
353	J9	1903	Coey	1930	1931	Withdrawn 1931 after accident
354	J9	1903	Coey	1935	1962	
249	J9	1912	Coey	1932	1963	
250	J9	1912	Coey	1934, 1949	1963	
251	J9	1912	Coey	1937	1964	
252	J9	1912	Coey	1931, 1954	1961	
257	J4	1913	Coey/Maunsell	1934	1960	
258	J4	1913	Coey/Maunsell	1937, 1952	1963	
259	J4	1913	Coey/Maunsell	1935	1959	
260	J4	1913	Coey/Maunsell	1931, 1948	1962	
261	J4	1914	Coey/Maunsell	1948	1965	
262	J4	1914	Coey/Maunsell	1934	1965	
263	J4	1914	Coey/Maunsell	1936	1962	
264	J4	1914	Coey/Maunsell	1932	1960	

== Incidents ==
Locomotive 353 was withdrawn in 1931 due collision damage at Monasterevin in 1930.
