= Robert Coey =

Locomotive Superintendent of the GS&WR

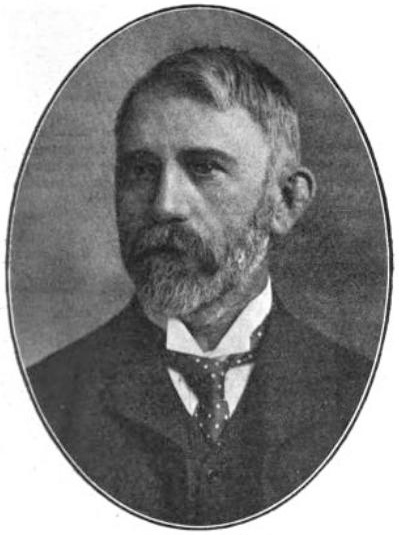
- In The Railway News, 1 July 1911
- Born: 1851; Belfast, Northern Ireland
- Died: 24 August 1934 (aged 83); Harrogate, England
- Education: Royal College of Science for Ireland; Queen's University Belfast
- Engineering career
- Employers: Great Southern and Western Railway, Ireland
- Awards: Whitworth scholarship

Robert Coey (1851–1934) was a locomotive superintendent of the Great Southern and Western Railway (GS&WR) of Ireland from 1896 until 1911.

== Life ==
Coey was born to parents James and Sarah at Letitia Street, Belfast in 1851 who had married in September 1850. He was to be followed by three male and three female siblings, some of whom were to adopt the Scottish variant of the surname, namely Cowie.

Coeys father was an engineer, and following the same line Coey began his career with an apprenticeship at Victor Coates Lagan Foundry, Belfast. This included experience designing and building industrial steam engines. In 1871 he studied for a year at Royal College of Science for Ireland to improve his theoretical knowledge before gaining a Whitworth scholarship in 1872 and attending Queen's University Belfast. (Note: Murray and McNeill claimed Coey entered the Inchicore Railway Works of the GS&WR in 1873.) Coey gained a first class Bachelor of Engineering from Queen's in 1875 and started with Dublin Port and Docks board in 1876 rising to Clerk of Works relatively quickly, projects including work on Carlisle Bridge.

In 1880 Coey joined Inchicore Railway Works as a draughtsman under the final years of Alexander McDonnell. By spare time study Coey achieved a master's degree in engineering from Queen's in 1882.

He became works manager in 1886 under Henry Ivatt. Coey became Locomotive Superintendent in December 1895 until retirement in 1911 due to ill-health when the post passed to Richard Maunsell.

Despite the ill-health that forced his retirement, Coey lived to 83 and died in Harrogate on 24 August 1934.

=== Brothers ===
Two of Coey's brothers were to be involved with railways in Ulster. His brother James Cowie, born in 1855, rose from junior clerk in the Belfast and Northern Counties Railway (BNCR) in 1869 to its general manager in 1899, retaining the same post with its successor organisation the North Counties Committee until retirement in 1922. Henry Cowie, some 20 years younger than Robert Coey, joined the BNCR in 1885 and rose to chief clerk in the general manager's office of the NCC before retiring in 1931.

== Designs ==
Increasingly powerful freight and passenger locomotive designs were developed for that railway during this period. During his tenure as locomotive superintendent for the GS&WR, Coey managed a team of good reputation. Members of the team included Maunsell as works manager, E. E. Joynt at chief draughtsman, and H. W. Crosthwait as running superintendent.

=== Passenger ===
Coey is noted for his series of 4-4-0 express passenger designs at Inchicore that allowed the GS&WR expresses to cater for increasing train weights at the turn of the twentieth century, these being significantly larger than the preceding Aspinall Classes 52 and 60. The subsequent rebuilds of these engines meant by the 1930s it was rare to find any two exactly alike, though Oswald Nock noted many were to do much useful work following rebuilds in the 1920s. The final 12 of these engines, the Class 321/D2, were noted for their work on Cork and Limerick expresses and occasionally standing-in for 4-6-0 absences, being described by Boocock as follows "their life of more than 50 years was well earned, being a true R. Coey product, simple and reliable".

Eight Further passenger engines of Class 333 were produced from 1906 with smaller driving wheels and low 16 long tons (16 t) axle limit giving them a broader route availability and better efficiency at secondary passenger and mixed traffic duties. Harty, of the successor company the Great Southern Railways, was to produce five more to broadly the same design in 1936.

Coey also receives part credit for the one-off 1912 4-4-0 Sir William Goulding that was to be used on the flagship Limited Mail Express services between Dublin and Cork.

=== Freight ===
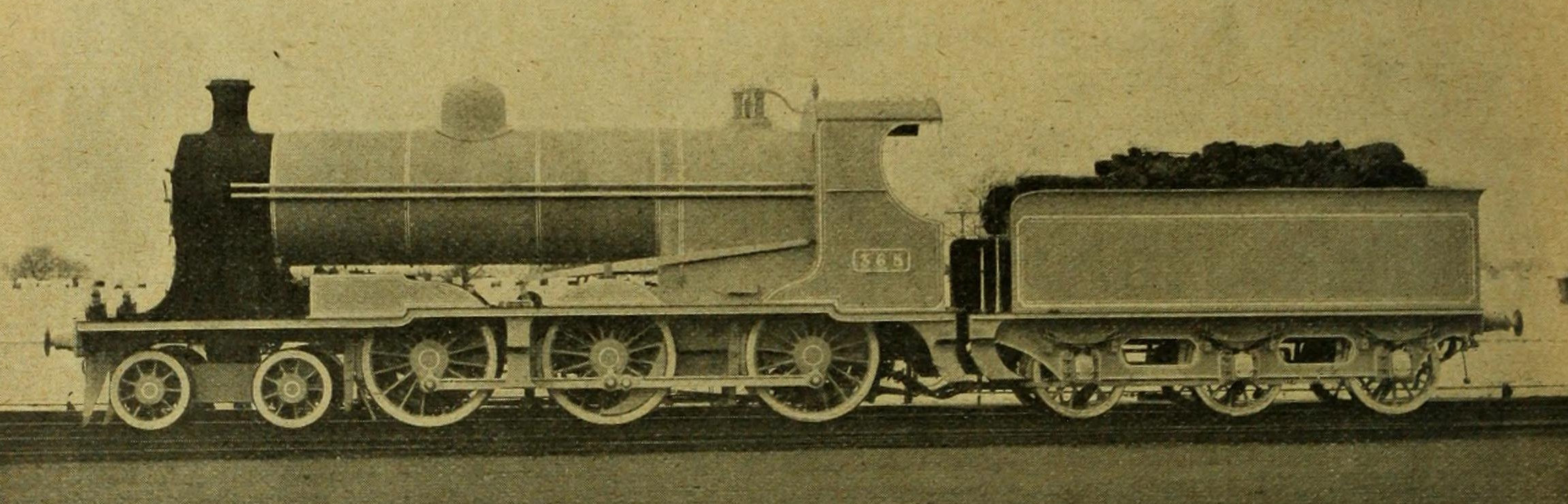
Coey's 4-6-0 for fast freight in photographic grey

On the Freight locomotive side Coey was to the final 12 of Alexander McDonnell's Class 101/J15 before attempting more powerful designs including the 2-6-0 Classes 355 and 368, and the first 4-6-0 tender design in Ireland, Class 362.

=== Railmotor ===
The steam railmotor came into use for lightly used branch services in the first decade of the 1900s, and several rail operating companies in Ireland imported examples though they were generally not successful. Coey designed the first example to be constructed in Ireland. Introduced in 1904 the engine component was a 0-2-2T with outside cylinders and a vertical boiler. The carriage section had capacity for six first and 40 third class passengers, some seated, and was of a grand appearance. Tried on Kingsbridge—Amiens Street services, then Cashel and Killaloe branches it proved to use coal very inefficiently and was unable to haul a trailer car. This led to it being withdrawn and abandoned by 1915.
