= 351 (disambiguation) =

351 or variation, may refer to:

- 351 (number), a number in the 300s range
- AD 351 (CCCLI) a year in the Common Era
- 351 BC, the year before the common era

== Places ==
- Area code 351, for telephones for Northeast Massachusetts
- +351 country code for telephones for Portugal
- 351 Yrsa, asteroid #351, the 351st asteroid registered, a Main Belt asteroid
- 351 (building), downtown, St. John's, Newfoundland Island, Newfoundland and Labrador, Canada; an office building
- List of highways numbered 351 for Route 351

== Military and weaponry ==
- .351 Winchester Self-Loading ammunition
- Type 351 Radar
- 351st Operations Group
- 351st Division (Imperial Japanese Army)
- 351st Reconnaissance Aviation Squadron
- No. 351 Squadron RAF
- KRI Ahmad Yani (351), Indonesian navy frigate, pennant number 351
- TCG Mareşal Fevzi Çakmak (D 351), Turkish navy destroyer
- USS Maurice J. Manuel (DE-351), WWII U.S. Navy destroyer escort
- USS Macdonough (DD-351), WWII U.S. Navy destroyer
- German submarine U-351, WWII German submarine
- I-351-class submarine, WWII Japanese submarine class

== Vehicles and transportation ==
- Ford 351 (disambiguation), several engines
- Peterbilt 351, a truck tractor unit
- GS&WR Class 351 locomotive
- 351 (New Jersey bus)

== Other uses ==
- Japan Airlines Flight 351, a hijacked flight

== See also ==
- B.1.351, a variant of COVID-19 SARS-CoV-2 virus found in South Africa
