= GS&WR Class 900 =

GSWR Class 900
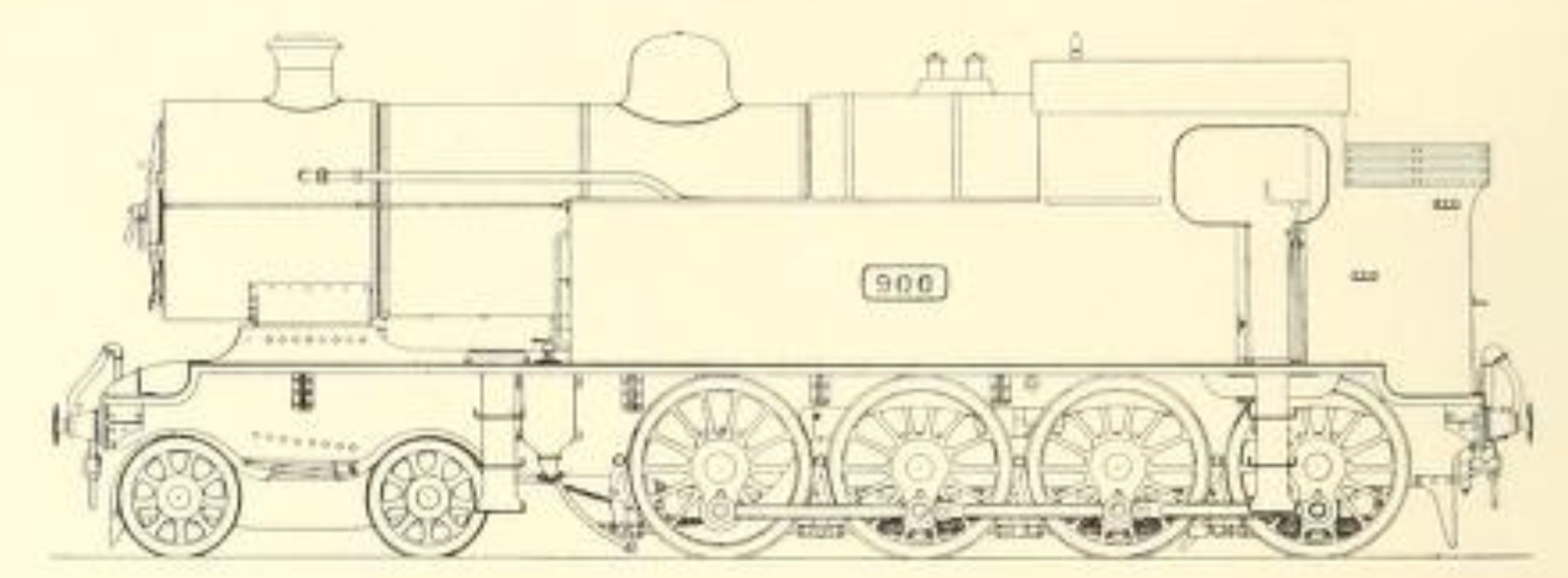
Type and origin
- Power type: Steam
- Designer: E.A. Watson
- Builder: Inchicore
- Build date: 1915—1924
- Total produced: 2
Specifications
- Configuration
  - Whyte: 4-8-0T
- Gauge: 5 ft 3 in (1,600 mm)
- Leading dia.: 3 ft 0 in (910 mm)
- Driver dia.: 4 ft 6 1/2 in (1,384 mm)
- Length: 37 ft 10 3/4 in (11,551 mm)
- Axle load
  - 1st coupled: 17.2 long tons (17.5 t)
  - 2nd coupled: 15.2 long tons (15.4 t)
- Loco weight: 80.75 long tons (82.05 t)
- Water cap.: 1,500 imp gal (6,800 L; 1,800 US gal)
- Boiler pressure: 175 lbf/in^{2} (1.21 MPa)
- Cylinders: 2
- Cylinder size: 19 1/4 in × 26 in (489 mm × 660 mm)
Performance figures
- Tractive effort: 26,300 lbf (116.99 kN)
Career
- Operators: GS&WR; GSR
- Class: A1 (Inchicore)
- Power class: B
- Number in class: 2
- Numbers: 900—901
- Locale: Ireland
- Withdrawn: 1928—1931

The Great Southern and Western Railway (GS&WR) Class 900 consisted of a pair of 4-8-0T locomotives designed by E.A. Watson and introduced in 1915 and 1924 as a heavy shunter and banker for use on the relatively severe gradient from Kingsbridge to Clondalkin.

== Design ==
The locomotives were unique as being the only locomotives with eight-coupled driving wheels on the Irish 5 ft 3 in (1,600 mm) gauge, though Watson had chosen to dismiss drawings for an 0-8-2T prepared under his predecessor R. E. L. Maunsell. The cylinders drove the leading coupled driving axle. Some components were common with GS&WR Class 362 and 368.

== Operation ==
They were noted as being prone to derailment on sidings which could have sharp curves and be poorly ballasted, though thin flanges on the middle driving wheels combined with a long wheelbase and additional weight on the leading axle may equally have been factors. Engine 900 was later converted to a [4-6-2T] by removing the coupling rods to the rear driving wheels.

Engine 901 was introduced nine years after 900 by J.R. Bazin, and was the only engine to be introduced by the Great Southern Railway which existed for less than two months before being joined with the Dublin and South Eastern Railway to form Great Southern Railways (GSR).

The engines were not particularly successful and were regarded as surplus to requirements and withdrawn after a short life by 1931 as it was found their work could be adequately performed by standard locomotives.

== Model ==
There is a detailed O Gauge model of engine 900 in the Fry model railway collection.
