= Casino Model Railway Museum =

Museum holding the Fry Collection, Malahide, Ireland

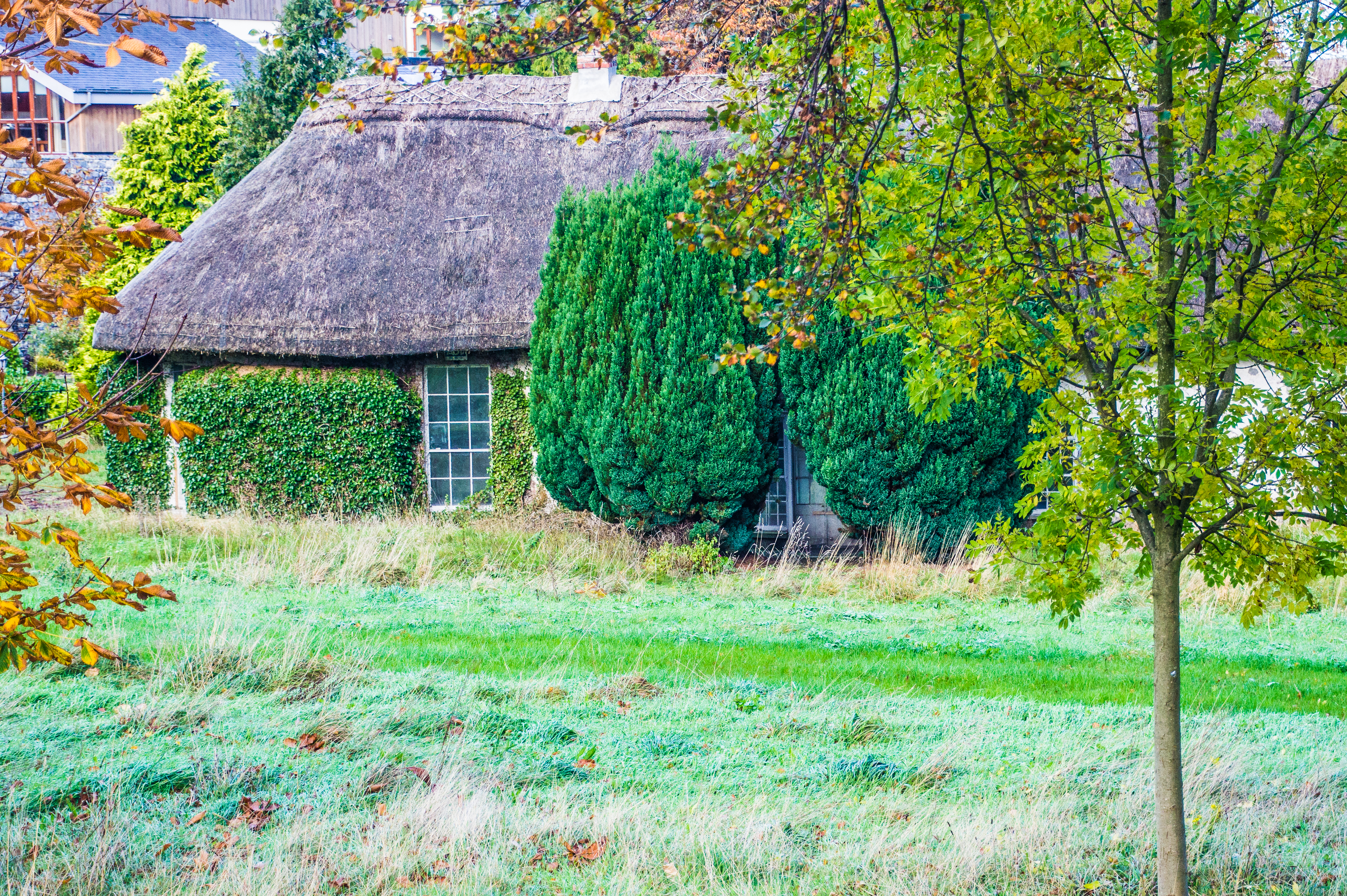
- Casino building before refurbishment
- Former name: Fry Model Railway
- Established: 22 January 2020
- Location: Malahide, Ireland
- Coordinates: 53.450634°N 6.158326°W
- Collections: Fry Model Railway; Fry Collection
- Founder: Cyril Fry
- Owners: Fingal County Council; Shannon Heritage (Note: operator)
- Public transit access: Malahide railway station
- Website: Official website

The Casino Model Railway Museum at Malahide, Ireland (previously called the Fry Model Railway) is the display home for the Fry Model Collection in the refurbished Casino cottage building in central Malahide. It opened to the public on 22 January 2020.

The railway and collection was moved from its previous home in Malahide Castle in 2010. The collection originated from the work of Cyril Fry who had created the collection to run on his layout at his cottage in Churchtown, Dublin.

== History ==
The layout and collection was created by the railway engineer and draughtsman Cyril Fry, an employee of Inchicore Works, and his family. The collection of models passed to Dublin Tourism in the 1970s, following Mr Fry's death. Following work by retired CIÉ craftsman Thomas Tighe at Inchicore Works a new model railway was moved to Malahide Castle in 1988, which operated with models made by other modellers, with the Fry collection on display in viewing cases.

=== Move from Malahide Castle ===
The exhibition was forced to be removed to storage for the redevelopment of Malahide Castle in 2010 following notice from the owners Fingal County Council. A 'Friends of the Fry Model Railway' association was formed and initial suggestions of where to relocate included Collins Barracks, Dublin. The only viable proposal to emerge was to re-open the railway at the basement Eblana Theatre in the Bus Éireann station in Dublin. An unexpected turn of events was that a wealthy farmer who died in January 2012 left a bequest of €1.5m to restore the Casino House cottage near Malahide railway station but a condition of the legacy was that it be used to hold the Fry model railway exhibition. Fáilte Ireland initially wished to continue with the Bus Éireann option however this would have lost the conditions for the bequest. By April 2012 Fingal County Council determined to accept the bequest and the incumbent transport minister Leo Varadkar indicated he was delighted the matter was resolved. In a Malahide/Howth area committee meeting in June 2017 councillors expressed frustrations over the delays but that matters concerning heritage buildings were complex and of the need to meet the constraints of the funding bequest.

In September 2017 the exhibition was expected to re-open in 2019 following refurbishment of the 'Casino' cottage building near Malahide railway station. By the end of April 2018 some progress had been made with the tendering process complete and the contractor having commenced on site with extension and refurbishment of the Casino Cottage to complete in February 2019 with public opening expected Spring 2019. October 2018 saw the plan broadly on the course of the September 2017 timetable to re-open in early 2019 in Malahide following the refurbishment and extension of the Casino building. However reported expected costs rose through 2018 from €2.4 million to €2.7 million and on to €3.2 million. In May 2019 the work on the Casino building was stated as complete and re-opening was scheduled for Autumn 2019. In August 2019 Shannon Heritage was appointed operator for the facility, seemingly termed the Casino Model Railway Museum, with official opening remaining to be expected "later this year".

=== Casino House ===
Casino House was built around 1750 though some claims date it earlier to the late 17th century. It is a two-story thatched house with eight bays. It was a shooting lodge for the Talbot family (though some have suggested a romantic summer house) and remained with the family until 1927. The building had been allowed to deteriorate. May 2019 saw the building renovated and extended to house the railway museum and collection.

== Fry collection ==
The Fry collection includes hand-built models of Irish features, stations and trains represents Irish railway heritage since the about the 1840s. While the O gauge models were usually very accurate the Drumm Battery Train model appears to have been taken from preliminary drawings incorporating streamlined ends which did not appear in the actual train. A figure of about 360 rail vehicles is mentioned. (Note: Sources it is unclear if this figure includes items added to run the Malahide Castle layout)

=== Steam locomotive models ===
Partial list of steam motive power models in the Fry Collection
| Company | Number | Class | Type | Livery | Notes |
|---|---|---|---|---|---|
| D&KR | Hibernia | | 2-2-0 | | (Note: Described as The first train in Ireland the image also depicts four different period coach types. While Hibernia certainly hauled the scheduled first passenger train on 17 December 1834 there is legend Vauxhall was the first locomotive on Irish rails) |
| D&DR | 8 | | 2-2-2T | Green | |
| GS&WR | 47 | 47/E3 | 0-4-4BT | Grey | |
| GS&WR | 341 | 341/D1 | 4-4-0 | GS&WR | Sir William Goulding |
| GS&WR | | 362/B3 | 4-6-0 | Lined GSR green | Livery incorrect - GSR only applied green livery to the three 800 class. |
| GS&WR | 501 | 500/B1 | 4-6-0 | Lined GSR green | Type E tender, livery incorrect |
| GS&WR | 900 | 900/A1 | | Lined GSR green | Livery incorrect, original locomotive 4-8-0T rebuilt to 4-6-2T |
| DSER | 461 | 461/K2 | 2-6-0 | CIÉ Black | Original locomotive preserved |
| WTR | 2 | 483/N1 | 2-2-2T | Original | |
| MGWR | 13 | 650/G2 | 2-4-0 | Original MGWR green | MGWR K Class Rapid |
| WCR | 5 | 5C/IN1 | 0-6-2T | Original | Narrow gauge, Original locomotive preserved |
| WCR | 2 | 2C/PN1 | 2-6-2T | Original | Narrow gauge |
| GSR | 372 | 372/K1 | 2-6-0 | CIÉ Green | |
| GSR | 670 | 670/I3 | 0-6-2T | CIÉ Green | |
| GSR | 710 | 710/J15b | 0-6-0 | CIÉ | |
| GSR | 800 | 800/B1a | 4-6-0 | CIÉ | Maeḋḃ, original locomotive preserved |
| GS&WR | 404 | 400/B2 | 4-6-0 | Lined black | Built by Bassett-Lowke for the British Empire Exhibition |
| SLNCR | 26 | Lough | 0-6-4T | Unlined black | Lough Melvin |
| TDLR | 4 | TLDR/4 | 0-4-2T | | Narrow gauge |
| NCC | | WT | 2-6-2T | | (Note: From Display photographs on website) |
| GNRI | 83 | V | 4-4-0 | Blue | "Eagle" |

=== Railcars and trams ===
Partial list of railcar and tram motive power models in the Fry Collection
| Type | Company | Number | Date | Details |
|---|---|---|---|---|
| Tram | DUTC | 147 | 1905 | Four-wheeled open top vestibuled |
| Tram | CIÉ | 297 | 1933 | Dalkey luxury bogie car |
| Locomotive | D&BST | 6 | 1887 | 0-4-0 locomotive |
| Trailer | D&BST | 7 | 1887 | Single deck bogie trailer |
| Tram | Giant's Causeway | 9 | 1883 | Four wheel tram as refurbished in 1899 |
| Tram | DUTC | 307 | 1900 | Hill of Howth bogie open car |
| Tram | Giant's Causeway | 24 | | Portion of single deck car on Brill trucks |
| Tram | Bessbrook and Newry | 2 | 1885 | Bogie motor coach, original is at the Ulster Folk and Transport Museum |
| Tram | DUTC | 288 | 1919 | Balcony tramcar with body from Spa Road Works |
| Railcar | GSR | C (Note: The Fry model of the 3rd Drumm battery unit uses a design that was proposed with streamline ends but which differs from the train as built) | | Drumm battery train 2nd generation from a design proposal |
| Railmotor | GSR | 362 | 1928 | Clayton Steam Railmotor |
| Railcar | CDR | 18 | 1940 | Built by GNR and now preserved at Fintown |

== Casino layout ==
The new layout is expected to be able to run six trains simultaneously. There will be about 360 hand-built carriages and locomotives. (Note: The figure of 360 vehicles may relate to either or both of vehicles in the collection and trains on the exhibition layout) The new layout is on an 11m x 4m table (44 square metres (470 sq ft)) with additional trains running on overhead tracks. The main basis of the running display layout is a double loop oval with single track round Bray Head at one end and Dublin city represented at the other. Mallow railway station in County Cork and the local Malahide station are represented on the sides; while a single track loops overhead.

The Casino incorporates an educational centre available to groups of scholars.

== Previous layouts ==
=== Churchtown ===
The original layout evolved in Cyril Fry's own home, and he originally called it "The Irish International Railway and Tramway System".

=== Malahide Castle ===
A dedicated O gauge display was set up at Malahide Castle in June 1988 after being prepared at Inchicore from the early 1980s. It was a working miniature rail display that grew to 2,500 square feet (230 m^{2}). The core design of the layout consisted of three double track loops encircling the control area in the middle. One end of the layout depicted Dublin with the opposite corners representing Cork and Belfast. Even an Irish Sea mail Packet boat was represented in the background. In between various scenes of Irish rail scenes through the ages were depicted.

== See also ==
- List of model railways
