= 1892 V =

1892 V may refer to:

- 206P/Barnard–Boattini, comet
- 351 Yrsa, asteroid
