= GS&WR Class 301 =

Express passenger locomotive of Ireland

GS&WR 301 Class
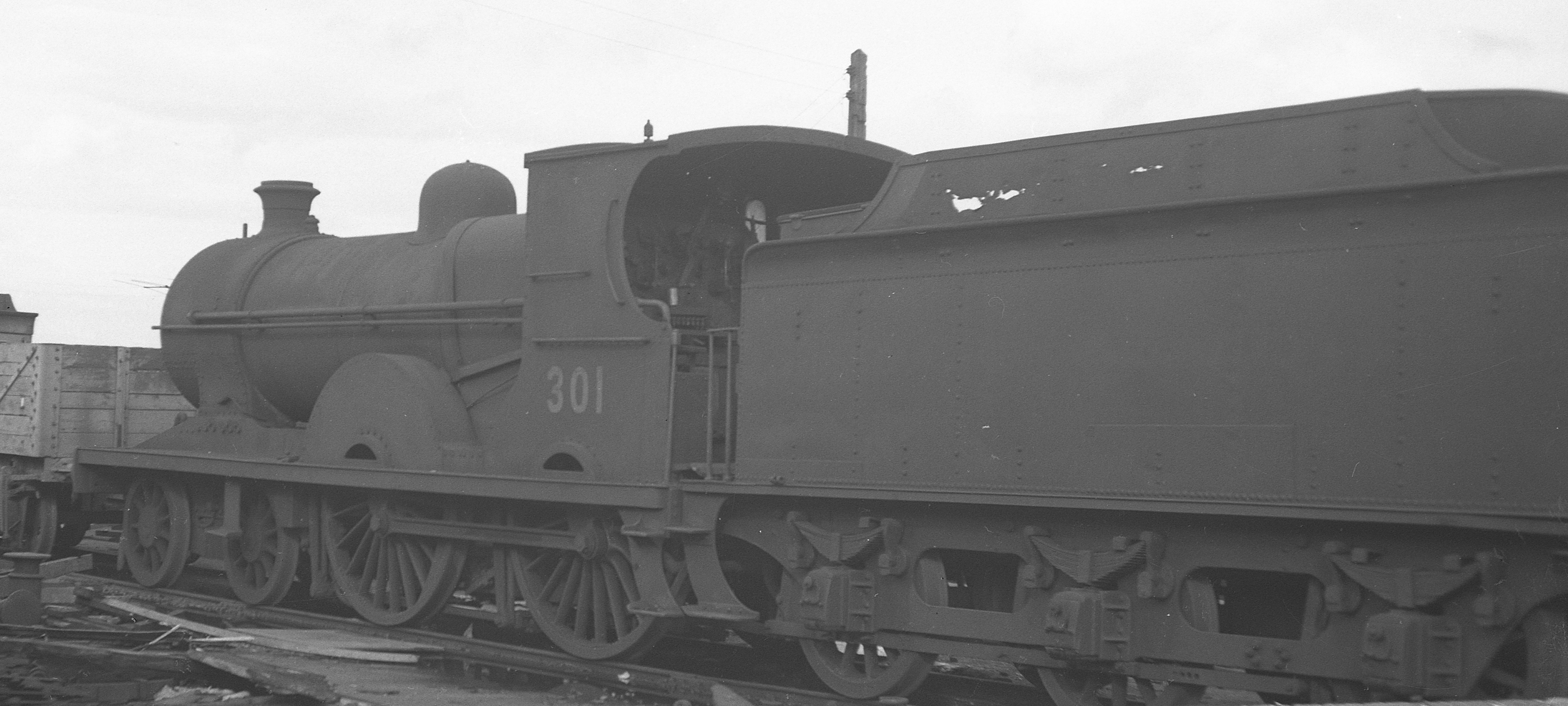
- No. 301 withdrawn at Amiens St. (1962)
Type and origin
- Power type: Steam
- Designer: Robert Coey
- Builder: Inchicore
- Build date: 1900–1907
- Total produced: 26
Specifications
- Configuration
  - Whyte: 4-4-0
- Gauge: 5 ft 3 in (1,600 mm)
- Leading dia.: 3 ft 6 in (1,070 mm)
- Driver dia.: 6 ft 7 in (2,010 mm)
- Length: 29 ft 10 3/4 in (9,112 mm)
- Axle load: 15.95 long tons (16.21 t)
- Adhesive weight: 30.55 long tons (31.04 t)
- Loco weight: 47.0 long tons (47.8 t)
- Water cap.: 3,345 imp gal (15,210 L; 4,017 US gal)
- Boiler pressure: 160 lbf/in^{2} (1.10 MPa)
- Cylinders: 2
- Cylinder size: 18 in × 26 in (457 mm × 660 mm)
Performance figures
- Tractive effort: 14,500 lbf (64.50 kN)
Career
- Operators: GS&WR; GSR; CIÉ
- Class: D10/D11/D12/D13/D4/D3/D2 (Inchicore)
- Number in class: 26
- Numbers: 301–314, 321–333
- Locale: Ireland
- Withdrawn: 1960
- 1. 301 as built

The Great Southern and Western Railway (GS&WR) Classes 301. 305, 309 and 321 consisted of 26 4-4-0 tender locomotives designed by Robert Coey for passenger work and built between 1900 and 1907.

== Design and build ==
One priority at the start of the 1900s was to cater for the forecast increasing passenger train weights, the Cork limited mail for example increase from a load of eight six wheeled carriages in the 1860s weight less than 100 tons to over 250 tones by 1905. To address this problem Coey introduced a series of 4-4-0 locomotives that were noticeably larger than the preceding class 52 and 60.

The earlier classes were somewhat restricted in steaming. Records for the original 301 class seem to have some omissions and discrepancies but the Class 305, which had slightly larger heating surfaces than Class 301, were rebuilt almost immediately by 1906 with tapered saturated boilers. No. 308, rebuilt after just two years in 1904 to trial this border, was found to be seriously overweight and required remedial work on the frames to correct; this may have weakened them and it is speculated may have been the cause of the locomotives' early demise in 1933.

The evolved Class 321 with its tapered boiler and larger cylinder achieving a 20% increase in tractive effort over Class 301, albeit at the expense of a high axle load which restricted it to the Cork and Limerick main lines.

Coey passenger 4-4-0 class differences
Feature	301	305	309	321
Introduced	1900	1902	1903	1904
Number built	4	4	6	12
Tractive effort	14,500 lbf (64.50 kN)	14,500 lbf (64.50 kN)	15,320 lbf (68.15 kN)	15,320 lbf (68.15 kN)
Cylinder size	18 in × 26 in (457 mm × 660 mm)	18 in × 26 in (457 mm × 660 mm)	18 1/2 in × 26 in (470 mm × 660 mm)	18 1/2 in × 26 in (470 mm × 660 mm)
Builder	Inchicore	Inchicore	Neilson	Inchicore
Adhesive weight	30.55 long tons (31.04 t)	31.45 long tons (31.95 t)	30.9 long tons (31.4 t)	33.5 long tons (34.0 t)
Max axle load	15.95 long tons (16.21 t)	15.75 long tons (16.00 t)	16.0 long tons (16.3 t)	16.75 long tons (17.02 t)

Fleet
No.	Name	Built	Withdrawn	GSR	Inchicore	Notes
301	Victoria	1900	1960	301	D11	
302	Lord Roberts	1900	1957	301	D11	
303	Saint Patrick	1900	1959	301	D11	
304	Princess Ena	1900	1959	301	D11	
305		1902	1957	305	D12	
306		1902	1959	305	D12	
307		1902	1959	305	D12	
308		1902	1933	305	D12	
309		1903	1959	309/310	D13	Rebuilt for a while as Class 321
310		1903	1957	309/310	D13	
311		1903	1959	309/310	D13	1930 rebuild include class 321 frames
312		1903	1959	309/310	D13	Rebuilt for a while as Class 321
313		1903	1957	309/310	D13	
314		1903	1957	309/310	D13	
321		1904	1957	321		
322		1905	1960	321		
323		1905	1955	321		
324		1905	1928	321		
325		1905	1928	321		
326		1905	1927	321		
327		1905	1959	321		
328		1905	1959	321		
329		1906	1960	321		
330		1906	1957	321		
331		1906	1959	321		
332		1906	1959	321		

== Service ==
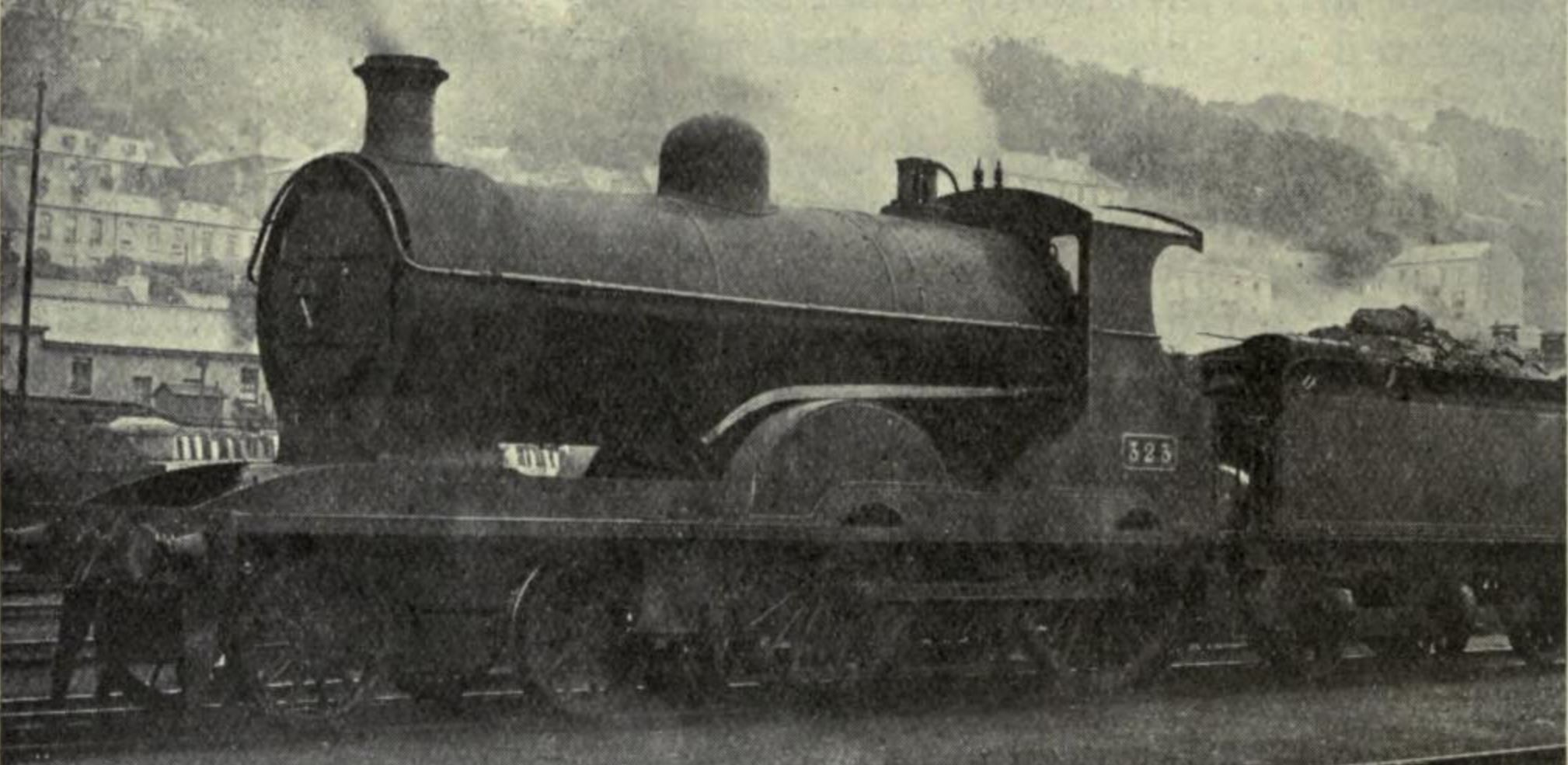
Class 321 No. 323

Most of Coeys' 4-4-0 locomotives gave service through to the late 1950s of even 1960 when they were displaced by the arrival of diesels. There are suggestions that most of the few earlier withdrawals may have been due to structural issues with the need to reduce weight.

On introduction the classes were the most powerful passenger locomotives on the GS&WR and all were noted for their ability to run at speed given a light enough load. Class 321 were allocated to the Cork and Limerick expresses. The arrival of the Coey/Maunsell prototype Sir William Goulding in 1913 and Watson's Call 400 4-6-0 in 1916 that Class 321 were displaced as first choice from the Cork Mail. Only after 1923 were further 4-6-0 locomotives to appear displacing the Class 321 from some of their duties though they were still often called in to deputise.

== Successors ==
Coey used the Class 321 as the basis for the smaller wheeled GS&WR Class 333 which had better route availability due to a lower axle loading and was better suited for mixed traffic work. Coey's last 4-4-0 design before early retirement at 60 to ill health was completed by Maunsell as the prototype Class 341 Sir William Goulding.
