= Richard Maunsell =

Irish locomotive engineer, also working in Britain

Richard Edward Lloyd Maunsell
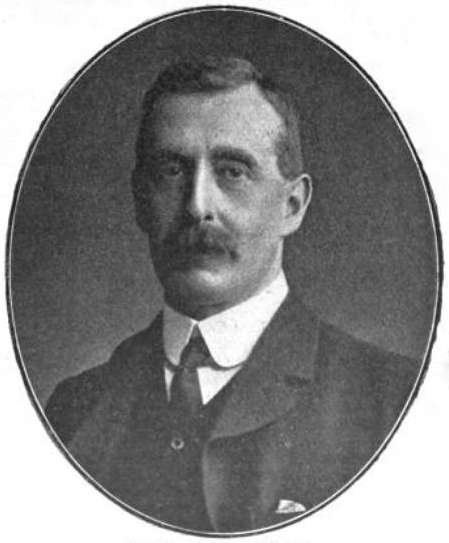
- In The Railway News, 8 July 1911
- Born: 26 May 1868; Raheny, County Dublin, Ireland
- Died: 7 March 1944 (aged 75); Ashford, Kent, England
- Spouse: Edith Pearson (m. 1896)
- Engineering career
- Discipline: Locomotive engineer

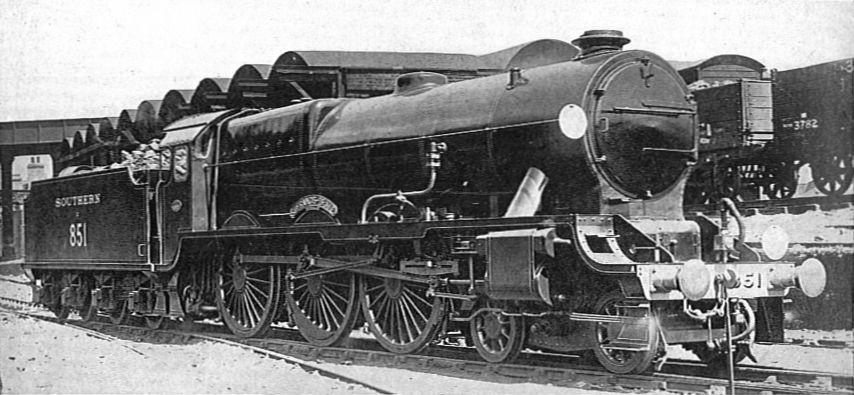
851 Sir Francis Drake, SR Lord Nelson class

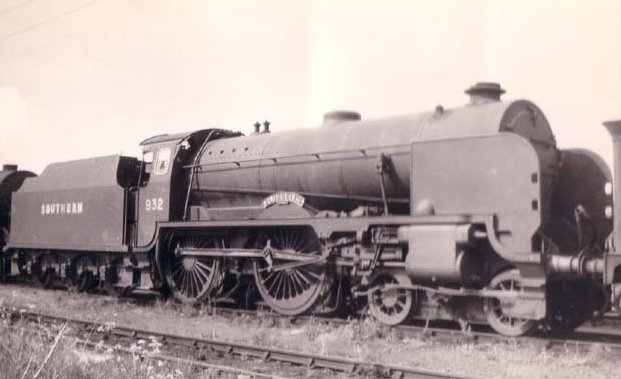
932 Blundell's Schools Class 4-4-0 at Eastleigh in 1948

Richard Edward Lloyd Maunsell CBE (pronounced "Mansell") (26 May 1868 – 7 March 1944) was an Irish locomotive engineer who held the post of chief mechanical engineer (CME) of the South Eastern and Chatham Railway from 1913 until the 1923 Grouping and then the post of CME of the Southern Railway in England until 1937. He had previously worked his way up through positions in other railways in Ireland, England and India.

== Biography ==
He was born on 26 May 1868 at Raheny, County Dublin, in Ireland, the seventh son of John Maunsell, a Justice of the Peace and a prominent solicitor in Dublin. He attended The Royal School, Armagh from 1882 to 1886. He commenced studies at Trinity College, Dublin on 23 October 1886 for a law degree; however by this stage he had shown a keen interest in engineering. He concurrently began an apprenticeship at the Inchicore works of the Great Southern and Western Railway (GS&WR) under H. A. Ivatt in 1888. (Note: In the 1880s at Trinity after the fresher year it was possible for engineers to pursue their professional course concurrently and take an abbreviated B.A. with no need to attend lectures provided annual examinations were passed) Following completion of his degree in January 1891 he was able to complete his apprenticeship at Horwich Works (Note: Ivatt had worked under Aspinall on the GS&WR before the latter moved to Horwich and they had an apprenticeship sharing agreement) on the Lancashire and Yorkshire Railway (as Nigel Gresley had done before him). At Horwich, he worked in the drawing office, before occupying the post of locomotive foreman in charge of the Blackpool and Fleetwood District.

It was at a social evening organised by the L&YR's Aspinall that Maunsell was to meet his future wife, Edith Pearson. He evidently impressed Edith as she was to send him a letter in March 1893 requesting a tour of the grain elevator at Fleetwood Docks. Their correspondence became increasingly familiar and on 1 August 1893 Maunsell wrote to Edith's father requesting permission for an engagement to be married, which was refused on the basis of funding (Note: Pearson's mill had been fire damaged with rebuilding costs a probable issue) with Edith sent to Paris.

Maunsell went to India in 1894, as assistant locomotive superintendent of the East India Railway, He subsequently was appointed district locomotive superintendent of the Asansol District.

He returned in 1896 to become works manager at Inchicore on the GS&WR., Robert Coey having been promoted to locomotive superintendent on the departure of Henry Ivatt. O.S. Nock comments "with Robert Coey as Locomotive Superintendent and R. E. L. Maunsell as Works Manager at Inchichore the whole department was run with a smoothness to equal anything in the British Isles". The increased salary with a free house finally met the income stipulations of Edith's father and enabled Maunsell to marry Edith on 15 June 1896 in London. Maunsell moved up to become locomotive superintendent in 1911.

In 1913, he was selected to succeed Harry Wainwright as CME of the South Eastern and Chatham Railway (SE&CR). When that line was merged in the 1923 grouping, with Urie of the London and South Western Railway retiring and with Billinton of the London, Brighton and South Coast Railway having less experience, he became chief mechanical engineer of the newly formed Southern Railway. He retired in 1937, Oliver Bulleid taking over from him.

He was appointed a Commander of the Order of the British Empire in the 1918 New Year Honours for his efforts during the First World War.

He died in Ashford, Kent on 7 March 1944.

== Locomotives ==
Maunsell's key skill was engineering management rather than locomotive design, and he made use of design teams to create easy-to-maintain locomotives that could operate the required services with effective performance. O. S. Nock in his book Irish Steam observed Maunsell was known to frequently stress the dictum "make everything get-at-able". He was responsible for several notable locomotive classes and related equipment.

From his second spell at the GS&WR he is jointly credited with his predecessor Robert Coey with the one-off express passenger engine 4-4-0 No. 341 Sir William Goulding. He is also credited there with the design of the GS&WR Class 257 (J4) of eight locomotives which were generally thought of as quite successful. While these were an incremental development of a series of GS&WR 0-6-0 classes of and in particular his predecessor Coey's GS&WR Class 351 (J9) Maunsell's locomotives were the first on the GS&WR to use superheaters and piston valves. With Maunsell departing Inchicore in 1913 the final members of this class were completed under his successor Watson.

While at the SE&CR in 1917 the Maunsell team created two related prototype locomotives: one was a 2-6-0 ("mogul") tender freight locomotive, that was to become SE&CR Class N; the other was a 2-6-4T SE&CR Class K for express passenger work. These were followed by over 200 succeeding locomotives including classes K, K1, N, N1, U, U1 and W. Further locomotives for other railways came from kits of parts produced at Woolwich Arsenal; these consisted of six kits purchased by the Metropolitan Railway Metropolitan Railway K Class and 26 kits purchased by Irish Railways classes 372 and 393 some of which were constructed at Inchicore, Maunsell's old establishment.

A major achievement was the introduction of the 4-6-0 SR Lord Nelson class locomotives and also the 4-4-0 SR V class or Schools Class, which were the ultimate and very successful development of the British 4-4-0 express passenger type. He also introduced pulverised fuel equipment and new types of valve gear.

== Patents ==
- GB191419269 (with George Victor Valen Hutchinson), published 26 November 1914, Improvements relating to steam superheaters
- GB192985 (with James Clayton), published 15 February 1923, Improvements in or relating to condensers for lubricators of the condensation type
- GB202523 (with James Clayton), published 23 August 1923, A double-feed lubricator

== See also ==
- Locomotives of the Southern Railway

== Notes, references and sources ==
=== Sources ===
- Chacksfield, J.E. (2010). Richard Maunsell - An Engineering Biography (revised ed.). Oakwood Press. ISBN 9780853616955.
- Clements, Jeremy; McMahon, Michael (2008). Locomotives of the GSR. Newtownards: Colourpoint Books. ISBN 9781906578268. OCLC 547074718.
- Nock, O.S. (1982). Irish steam : a twenty-year survey, 1920-1939. Newton Abbott and Pomfret, Vermont: David & Charles. ISBN 0715379615. OCLC 9802320.
- Swift, Peter (2012). Maunsell Moguls. Ian Allan. ISBN 9780711034006.

Business positions
Preceded by Robert Coey	Locomotive Superintendent of Great Southern and Western Railway; 1911–1913	Succeeded by Watson
Preceded by Harry Wainwright	Chief Mechanical Engineer of South Eastern and Chatham Railway; 1913–1923	Post abolished Company merged into Southern Railway
First Company created by Railways Act 1921	Chief Mechanical Engineer of Southern Railway; 1923–1937	Succeeded by Oliver Bulleid
