= GS&WR Class 362 =

Class of six Irish 4-6-0 locomotives

GSWR Class 362
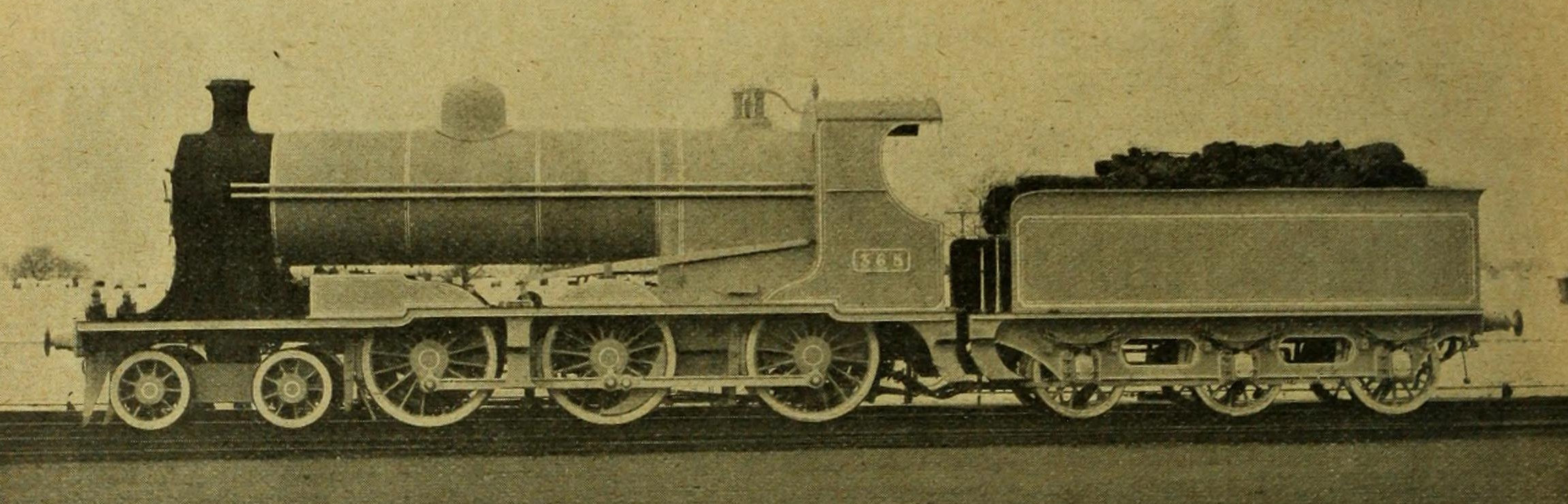
- No. 365 in photographic grey
Type and origin
- Power type: Steam
- Designer: Robert Coey
- Builder: Inchicore
- Build date: 1905—1907
- Total produced: 6
Specifications
- Configuration
  - Whyte: 4-6-0
- Gauge: 5 ft 3 in (1,600 mm)
- Leading dia.: 3 ft 0 in (910 mm)
- Driver dia.: 5 ft 1 3/4 in (1,568 mm)
- Length: 33 ft 6 3/4 in (10,230 mm)
- Adhesive weight: 44.9 long tons (45.6 t)
- Loco weight: 57.8 long tons (58.7 t)
- Water cap.: 3,345 imp gal (15,210 L; 4,017 US gal)
- Boiler pressure: 160 lbf/in^{2} (1.10 MPa)
- Cylinders: 2
- Cylinder size: 19 1/4 in × 26 in (489 mm × 660 mm)
Performance figures
- Tractive effort: 21,230 lbf (94.44 kN)
Career
- Operators: GS&WR; GSR
- Class: B3 (Inchicore)
- Power class: C
- Number in class: 2
- Numbers: 362—367
- Nicknames: Long Toms
- Locale: Ireland
- Withdrawn: 1928—1931

The Great Southern and Western Railway (GS&WR) Class 362, also known as class B3, consisted of six locomotives designed by Robert Coey and built between 1905 and 1907 for goods traffic and was the first tender locomotive to utilise the 4-6-0 wheel arrangement in Ireland. (Note: The narrow gauge Londonderry and Lough Swilly Railway operated 4-6-0T types since 1902)

== History ==
The class was designed to be more powerful than his preceding class 355 0-6-0. It was the first mainline use of the 4-6-0 wheel arrangement in Ireland, and an axle loading of under 16 long tons (16 t).

Chas. S. Lake, in his book Locomotives of 1906 illustrated the type as an example of the 4-6-0 becoming considered for other than express passenger usage, the Class 362 with its 5 ft 1 3/4 in (1,568 mm) driving wheels optimised for freight work. The GS&WR selected engine 366 to be displayed at the 1907 Dublin Exhibition.

While the designed increase in power was achieved the type did have some operational issues, these included being too long for some turntables, a tendency for rough riding at speed and incidents of derailment due to lack of weight on the forward bogie. (Note: This was in contrasts to Class 355 in original 0-6-0 form where the issue causing derailments was excessive front end weight) The class did not compare favourably with class 355 when the former were converted to the 2-6-0 wheel arrangement and were withdrawn by 1931.

There is a detailed O Gauge model of engine 362 in the Fry model railway collection.
