= GS&WR Class 333 =

GSWR 333/GSR 338/342 Class
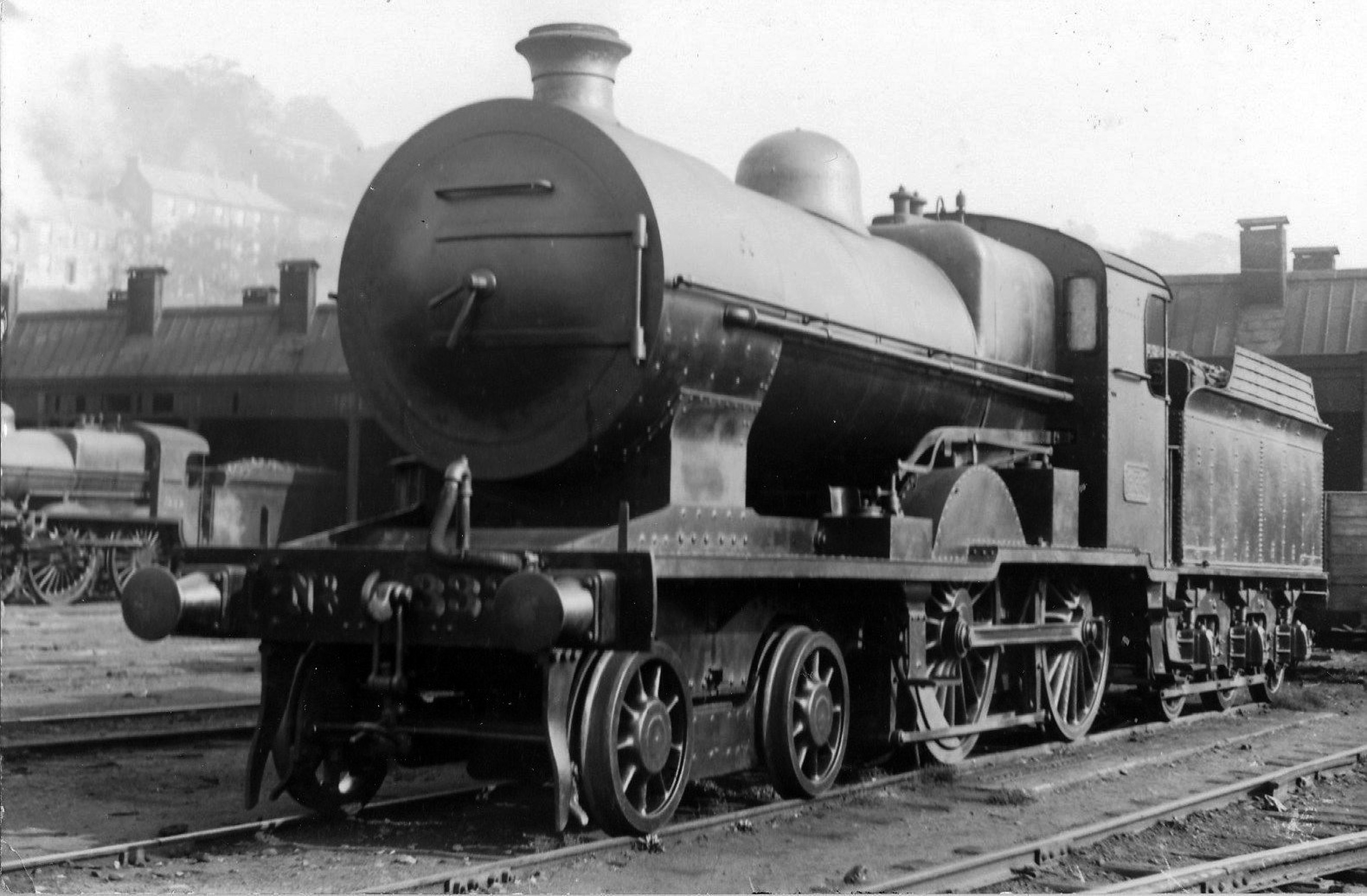
Type and origin
- Power type: Steam
- Designer: Coey (333); A. W. Harty (342)
- Builder: Inchicore
- Build date: 1907—1908 (333); 1936 (342)
- Total produced: 13 (333 & 342)
Specifications
- Configuration
  - Whyte: 4-4-0
- Gauge: 5 ft 3 in (1,600 mm)
- Leading dia.: 3 ft 0 in (910 mm)
- Driver dia.: 5 ft 8 1/2 in (1,740 mm)
- Length: 30 ft 1 3/4 in (9,188 mm)
- Adhesive weight: 32 long tons (33 t)
- Loco weight: 51.5 long tons (52.3 t)
- Water cap.: 3,450 imp gal (15,700 L; 4,140 US gal)
- Boiler pressure: 180 lbf/in^{2} (1.24 MPa)
- Cylinders: 2
- Cylinder size: 18 in × 26 in (457 mm × 660 mm)
Performance figures
- Tractive effort: 18,820 lbf (83.72 kN)
Career
- Operators: Great Southern and Western Railway (GSWR); Great Southern Railways (GSR); CIÉ
- Class: D4 (Inchicore)
- Power class: L
- Number in class: 8 (333); 5 (342)
- Numbers: 333—340,342—346
- Locale: Ireland
- Withdrawn: 1955—1960
- Disposition: All scrapped
- Class 342 as built except where noted

The Great Southern and Western Railway (GS&WR) Class 333 consistent of eight 4-4-0 mixed-traffic locomotives designed by Robert Coey and built by Inchicore railway works in 1907/8. In 1936, the successor company - the Great Southern Railways (GSR) - built five similar engines known as GSR Class 342.

== Design and modifications ==
The design used the same taper boiler and 18 in x 20 in cylinders as Coey's express 4-4-0 express passenger engine 321; however, the smaller driving wheels and less than 16 long ton maximum axle load were suitable for go anywhere and secondary passenger and mixed duties.

The later Class 342 locomotives were essentially modeled on the 1927 rebuild of locomotive No. 338 of the 333 Class.

== Service ==
In practice, all members of these classed were treated interchangeably for operational purposes. A 16 long tons (16 t) maximum axle load allowed the class to be used almost anywhere. They were assessed in 1948 as quite powerful and fast and especially useful for passenger specials.

=== Loan to GNRI ===
In 1946, No. 346 (which was an oil burner at the time) was lent to the Great Northern Railway (GNRI) to operate the Dublin-Bundoran express as far as Dundalk.
