= TDLR 4 =

Scrapped Irish steam locomotive

Tralee and Dingle No. 4
Type and origin
- Power type: Steam
- Builder: Hunslet
- Build date: 1890
- Total produced: 1
Specifications
- Configuration
  - Whyte: 0-4-2T
- Gauge: 3 ft (914 mm)
Career
- Withdrawn: 1907

Tralee and Dingle Light Railway 4 was a 0-4-2T was a 3 ft (914 mm) narrow gauge locomotive built by Hunslet Engine Company in 1890. It operated the Tralee and Dingle Light Railway's 6 mi (9.7 km) Castle-Gregory branch in County Kerry, Ireland, until withdrawn in 1907.

The locomotive had cabs at both ends and the controls were duplicated so there was no need to turn the locomotive round at each end of the route.

The Fry Collection includes a model of the locomotive. The picture of the Fry model shows a locomotive to apparently have a raised covered cab at both ends linked by the boiler with side tanks with the chimney extending though the somewhat longer cab at the front end. (Note: The presence or absence on controls in the forward cab is not obvious. The GER Class C53 an example of another steam locomotive with twin cabs.)

Following withdrawal the number 4 was taken in 1908 by 2-6-0T No. 8 built in 1903, the number 8 then being taken a locomotive built in 1910.

== Notes and references ==
=== Sources ===
- Jenkinson, David (August 1991). "The Fry Model Railway". Modellers' Back Track. Vol. 1, no. 3. Atlantic Transport Publishers.
- Clements, Jeremy; McMahon, Michael (2008). "Appendix K: GSR Locomotives in miniature". Locomotives of the GSR. Colourpoint Books. ISBN 9781906578268.
- Casserley, H.C. (1974). Outine of Irish Railway History. Newton Abbot: David & Charles. ISBN 0715363778.
