= GS&WR Class 500 =

GS&WR 500 Class
Type and origin
- Power type: Steam
- Designer: J. R. Bazin
- Builder: Inchicore Works
- Build date: 1924—1926
- Total produced: 3
Specifications
- Configuration
  - Whyte: 4-6-0
- Gauge: 5 ft 3 in (1,600 mm)
- Leading dia.: 3 ft 0 in (910 mm)
- Driver dia.: 5 ft 8 1/2 in (1,740 mm)
- Wheelbase
  - Engine: 37 ft 1 1/4 in (11,309 mm)
- Loco weight: 74.5 long tons (75.7 t)
Career
- Operators: Great Southern & Western Railway (GW&SR); Great Southern Railways (GSR); CIÉ
- Power class: B1
- Number in class: 3
- Numbers: 500—502
- Locale: Ireland
- Withdrawn: 1955—1957

The Great Southern and Western Railway (GS&WR) Class 500 were 4-6-0 locomotives intended for mixed-traffic work. The lead member of the class was built in 1924 under the GS&WR, the remaining two in 1926 under the amalgamated grouping of the Great Southern Railways (GSR).

== Design ==
The locomotive was designed by J. R. Bazin who sought to avoid some issues with the unrebuilt GS&WR 400 Class and was aimed at being a mixed-traffic type. Use of a valve travel of 6 3/4 inches (170 mm) and a 1 1/2 inches (38 mm) lap was a significant contributor to the performance of the type. The boiler was interchangeable with the existing GS&WR 400 Class.

== Service ==
Although a mixed-traffic type the engines could and were often used on passenger services which were the domain of the GS&WR 400 Class. It was pointed out in a 1948 report their smaller wheels made them unsuitable for that work and they should be allocated to goods and night mails.

== Livery ==
The locomotives were painted in Standard GS&WR/GSR Livery.

== Model ==
A model by C.R.H Wilson at 1:8 scale ratio was held by the Thinktank museum in Birmingham, United Kingdom. As of 2008 it was not on display. Construction for the model began in 1929 and took over 10 years. Whilst capable of live steam it is understood not to have been steamed because of the extreme detailing of the model for the period. There is a story Wilson chose this locomotive as only Bazin was prepared to provide him with drawings of the required detail, whilst other railway companies in the United Kingdom were not prepared to do so.
