= GS&WR Class 341 =

GSWR 341 Class
Type and origin
- Power type: Steam
- Designer: Robert Coey; Richard Maunsell
- Builder: Inchicore Works
- Build date: 1913
- Total produced: 1
Specifications
- Configuration
  - Whyte: 4-4-0
- Gauge: 5 ft 3 in (1,600 mm)
- Leading dia.: 3 ft 0 in (910 mm)
- Driver dia.: 6 ft 7 in (2,010 mm)
- Length: 32 ft 1 3/4 in (9,798 mm)
- Loco weight: 60.15 long tons (61.12 t)
- Water cap.: 3,345 imp gal (15,210 L; 4,017 US gal)
- Boiler pressure: 160 lbf/in^{2} (1.10 MPa); 175 lbf/in^{2} (1.21 MPa)
- Cylinders: 2
- Cylinder size: 20 in × 26 in (508 mm × 660 mm); 19 in × 26 in (483 mm × 660 mm)
Performance figures
- Tractive effort: 17,910 lbf (79.67 kN); 17,680 lbf (78.64 kN)
Career
- Operators: GS&WR; GSR
- Class: D1 (Inchicore)
- Number in class: 1
- Numbers: 341
- Locale: Ireland
- Withdrawn: 1928

The Great Southern and Western Railway (GS&WR) Class 341 consisted of a single 4-4-0 express passenger locomotive named Sir William Goulding introduced in 1913 for the Dublin—Cork route. Despite being an apparently capable design it was withdrawn in 1928.

== Design ==
Design was begun by Robert Coey who retired through ill health and completed by Richard Maunsell who was later to design the UK Southern Railway Schools 4-4-0. Equipped with a large diameter boiler and Schmidt superheater. It was unique for the GS&WR and its successor the GSR in having inside Walschaerts valve gear. This design was at the limit achievable by a 4-4-0 within the axle weight restriction limits and it was weighed regularly to ensure compliance. The only change to the initial design was a later reduction in cylinder diameter

== Service ==
Due to weight restrictions it served on the Dublin—Cork route only where from 1916 it later shared services with the new EA Watson designed 400 Class 4-6-0 against which engine 341 seems to have compared favourably.

== Withdrawal ==
The locomotive was withdrawn in 1928 after just 15 years, three 400 class express locomotives were also retired shortly afterwards as surplus to requirements.

== Model ==
There is a detailed O Gauge model of engine 341 in the Fry model railway collection.
