= Ford 351 =

Ford 351 may refer to:

- Ford 351 Windsor (351W), an engine part of the Ford 90 degree V family
- Ford 351 Cleveland (351C), an engine part of the Ford 335 family
- Ford 351 M (351M), an engine part of the Ford 335 family
