= GS&WR Class 101 =

Irish steam locomotive

Great Southern & Western Railway Class 101 GSR Class J15
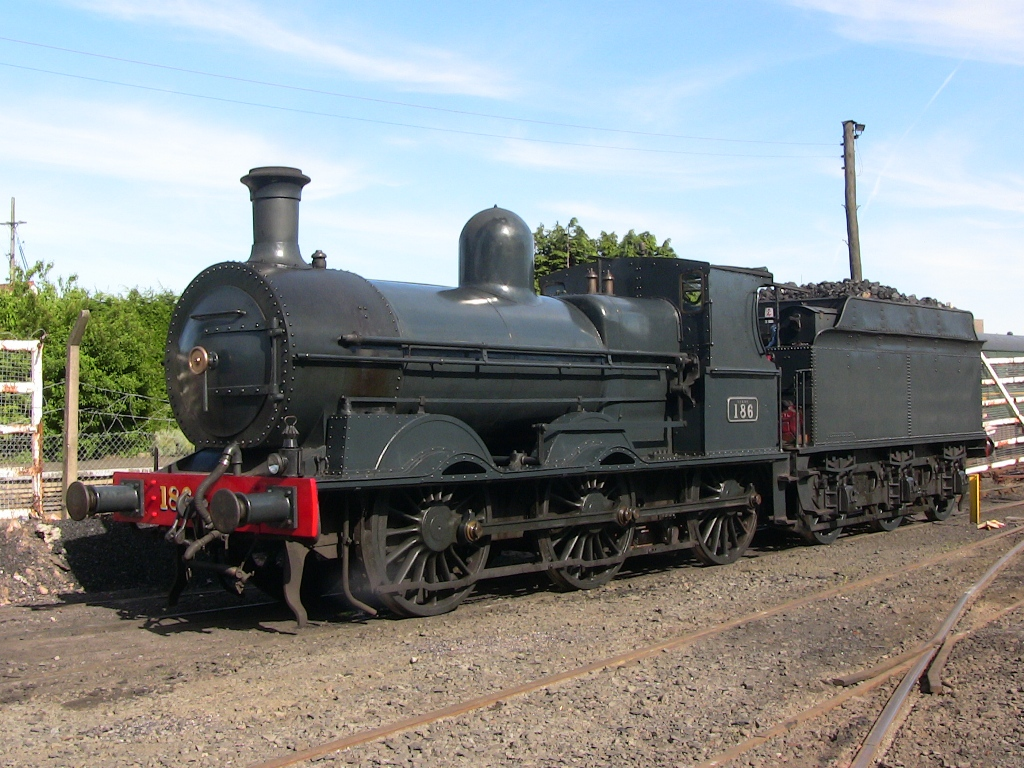
- Preserved No.186, with Belpaire firebox and large tender at Whitehead, County Antrim in 2010
Type and origin
- Power type: Steam
- Designer: Alexander McDonnell
- Builder: Inchicore Works (91); Beyer, Peacock & Company (12); Sharp, Stewart & Company (8)
- Serial number: BP: 747–750, 780–783, 1251–1252, 2029–2030; SS: 2155–2158, 2310–2311, 2837–2838
- Build date: 1866–1903
- Total produced: 111
Specifications
- Configuration
  - Whyte: 0-6-0
  - UIC: C
- Gauge: 5 ft 3 in (1,600 mm)
- Axle load: 13 long tons 0 cwt (29,100 lb or 13.2 t)
- Loco weight: 37 long tons 13 cwt (84,300 lb or 38.3 t)
- Cylinders: Two, inside
- Cylinder size: 18 in × 24 in (457 mm × 610 mm)
Performance figures
- Tractive effort: 17,170 lbf (76.4 kN)
Career
- Operators: GS&WR → GSR → CIÉ
- Class: GS&WR: 101; GSR: 101/J15
- Withdrawn: 1886–1963
- Preserved: 184 & 186
- Current owner: Railway Preservation Society of Ireland
- Disposition: 2 preserved, 109 scrapped

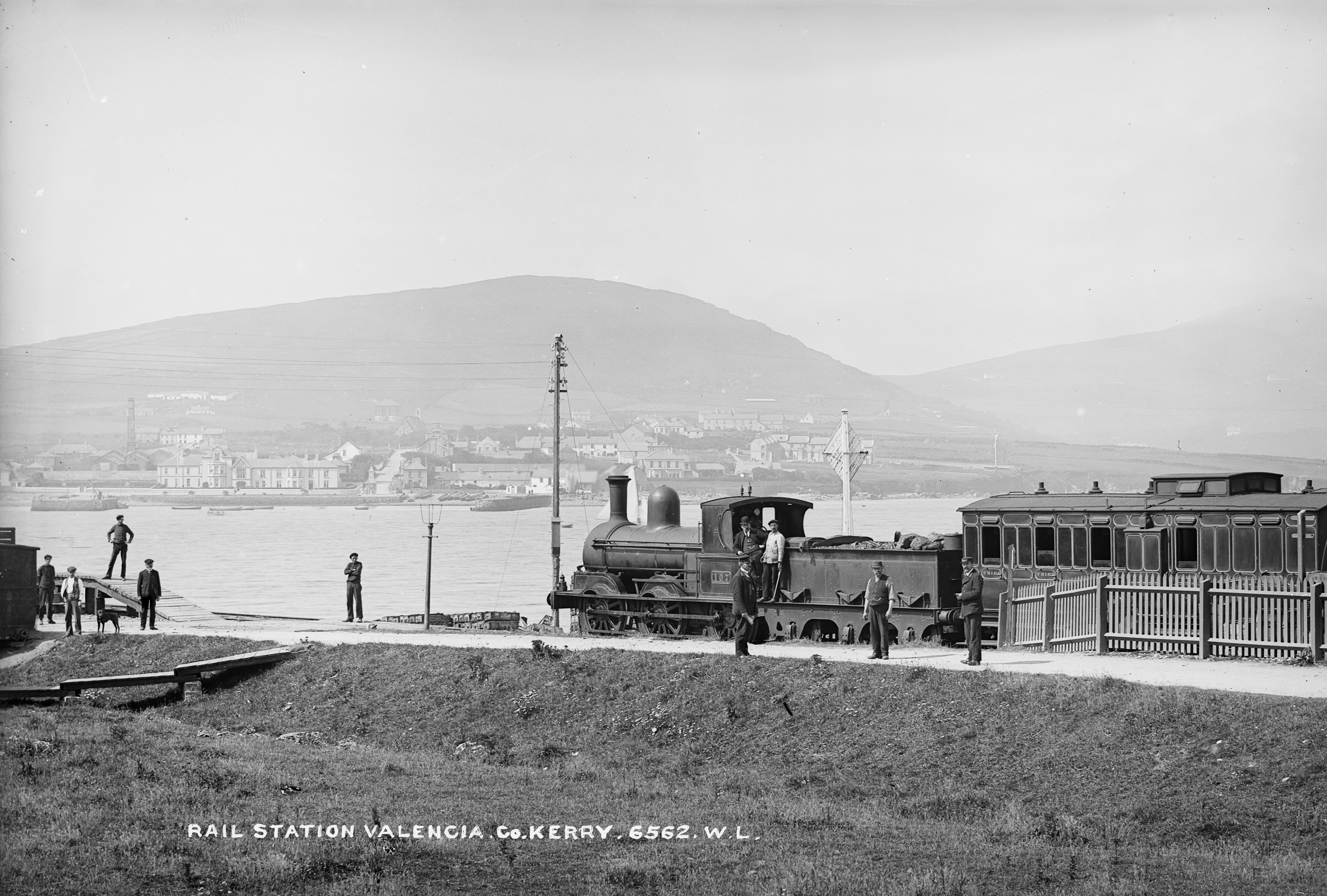
107 with unsuperheated boiler at Valentia (mistakenly spelt Valencia) about between 1901 and 1908

The GS&WR Class 101, classified as Class 101 or Class J15 by the Great Southern Railways, was a class of 0-6-0 steam locomotives designed for working goods traffic although they did, and were quite capable of, working branch and secondary passenger trains.

== History ==
The 101s were by far the most numerous class of locomotive (diesel or steam) ever to run in Ireland with 111 (Note: A figure of 119 has been stated by Clements, McMahon & O'Rourke which includes the 12 initially designated Class 200 built by Robert Coey in 1903 with larger boilers. This total of 119 versus the 111 claim relates to Nos. 103, 105, 110, 111, 114, 115, 147 and 149 which Clements, McMahon & O'Rourke claim to have confirmed were withdrawn and replaced by a new locomotive while others consider a rebuild took place.) being built between 1866 and 1903. The great majority were built by the GS&WR at Inchicore Works, though the construction of some examples was contracted out to Beyer, Peacock & Company (12) and Sharp, Stewart & Company (8).

The design is attributed to Alexander McDonnell, although evidence points to him developing the design from drawings supplied from Beyer, Peacock and Company of Manchester, England. McDonell appears to have utilised the drawings and produced a number of hybrids where parts were salvaged from a number of withdrawn 0-4-2 locomotives from various builders; the class 101 Inchicore Works creating locomotives broadly to the Beyer Peacock design from the withdrawn locomotives. The first three locomotives from Inchicore, Nos. 112 (June 1866), 113 (December 1866), and 118 (May 1867) are considered hybrids; recent analysis seems to indicate all nine Inchicore builds to No. 115 in October 1869 to be hybrid builds. Eight Beyer Peacock built Class 101 were built between May 1867 and March 1868. Inchicore built Nos. 155 and 156 with short wheelbases (4 inches (100 mm) less between the second and third axles, as per Nos. 114 and 115) in 1871 before commencing new builds of standard locomotives with No. 159 in September 1871.

Locomotive superintendents John Aspinall (1883), Henry Ivatt (1886), and Robert Coey (1896) continued to build the standard 101, with few modifications until c. 1899.

The original locomotives had cylinder sizes of 17 in × 24 in (432 mm × 610 mm), a boiler pressure of 140 lbf/in^{2} (0.97 MPa) giving a tractive effort of c. 13,760 lbf (61.21 kN). Modifications to new builds and respective fitting to older locomotives used a cylinder size of 18 in × 24 in (457 mm × 610 mm) with boilers which could be pressurized to 160 lbf/in^{2} (1.10 MPa) achieving an increased tractive effort of c. 17,060 lbf (75.89 kN)

Coey followed this in 1902/03 with the final 12 locomotives that differed by having the enlarged 4 feet 4 inches (1,320 mm) boiler and a modified cab. These were initially designated the 200 class but were brought into the 101 Class when rebuilds of earlier locomotives were equipped with the same boiler.

In 1925 the GS&WR were amalgamated with other railway companies whose territories did not extend into Northern Ireland to form Great Southern Railways (GSR), the GS&WR and Inchicore Works being the dominant party in the new concern. The 101 class generally kept to operating in the former GS&WR territory, the exception being the ex Dublin and South Eastern Railway area where the locomotive stock was in poor condition due to under investment, civil war losses, and the inadequacy of Canal Street Works. Members of the 101 class (among others) were therefore drafted in to assist commuter and other services for the DSER.

Locomotive superintendents Bazin and Harty in 1929 and 1934 introduced fifteen locomotives of the 700 (J15a)and 710 (J15b) classes which were in some respects direct developments of the 101 class. They were in many ways little better, and the 710 class in particular somewhat worse, than the latest rebuilt versions of the 101 class with superheated belpaire boilers.

=== D&BJR ===
In 1872 the Dublin and Belfast Junction Railway (D&BJR) bought two 0-6-0 locomotives from Beyer Peacock that were identical (Note: Johnston claimed the D&BJR engines has a sloping grate but the GS&WR ones did not) to those originally supplied to the GS&WR. On amalgamations these were to pass to the Northern Railway of Ireland in 1875 as Nos. 40 and 41 and before absorption into the Great Northern Railway in 1876, becoming designated Class "D". Reputed as "fine steaming engines" they were both given rebuilds c. 1888 and c. 1914 before being finally withdrawn in 1937 and 1934 respectively, the longest surviving D&BJR locomotives.

== Services ==
The main purpose of the type was goods train work, however soon after introduction their ability of secondary and branch line passenger and freight train work. From the turn of the twentieth century Coey and his successors introduced a number of locomotive types designed to be capable of handling heavier goods trains.

The class is sometimes noted as handling "mainline expresses", this mostly refers to the type often being used as pilot engine to assist Dublin expresses out the steep gradients for the first few miles out of Cork, though an August 1936 report also noted use on Dublin on Wexford main line passenger services.

== Livery ==
As built the locomotives would likely have carried the a dark version of the lined olive green livery of the GS&WR until around the start of the 20th century. (Note: Clements, McMahon & O'Rourke discuss relevant evidence for 19th century GS&WR liveries in some detail, there being degrees of uncertainty) After that, they were black with red lining until the late 1910s, when they were painted all over unlined grey. This dull but all-encompassing livery included motion, wheels, inside frames, cabs, smoke boxes and chimneys. The only relieving feature was the red buffer beam. Standard cast number plates were also painted over grey, with rim and numerals picked out in cream or very pale grey, or occasionally not at all. This livery persisted post-1925 into Great Southern Railways days, and was extended to locomotives of other constituent companies after the GSR amalgamation of that date. On the formation of CIÉ in 1945, the only change was that the cast number plates were gradually removed and pale yellow numerals were painted on instead. In addition, most tenders received a lined pale green "flying snail" logo.

While CIÉ repainted a few locomotives in green or black, all of the J15 class remained grey until withdrawal.

== Preservation ==
Two have been preserved by the Railway Preservation Society of Ireland, Nos.184 (1880) and 186 (1879). Both locomotives are out of service awaiting overhauls, with No. 186 last operating in late 2013.

=== No. 184 ===
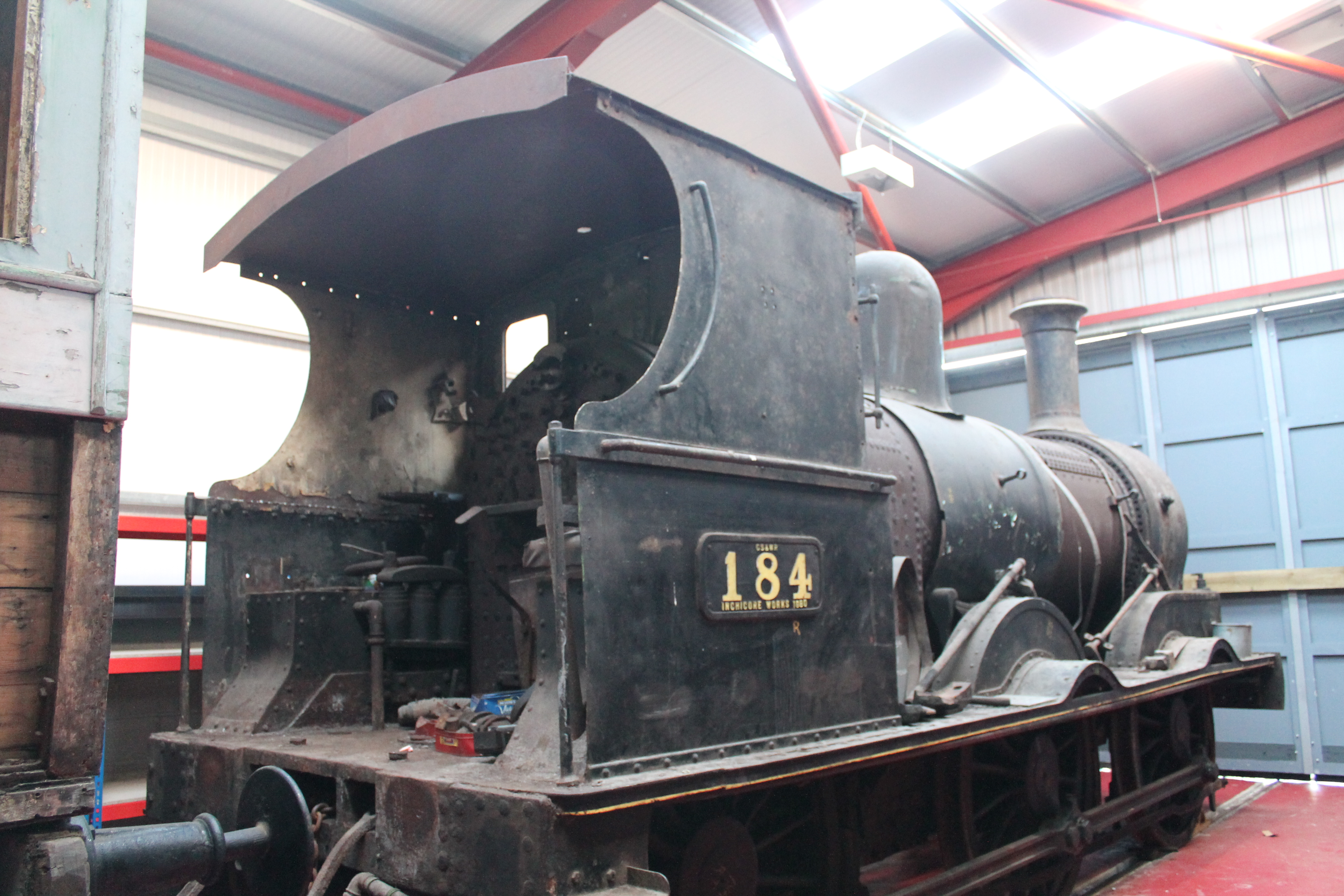
184, Whitehead

No. 184 has a smaller saturated boiler with round-topped firebox, and was paired with tender no. 156, an 1,864 imperial gallons (8,470 L; 2,239 US gal) outside-sprung tender. To give a larger water capacity, No. 184 has been paired with the larger tender from No. 186 when used on the Irish railway network.

=== No. 186 ===
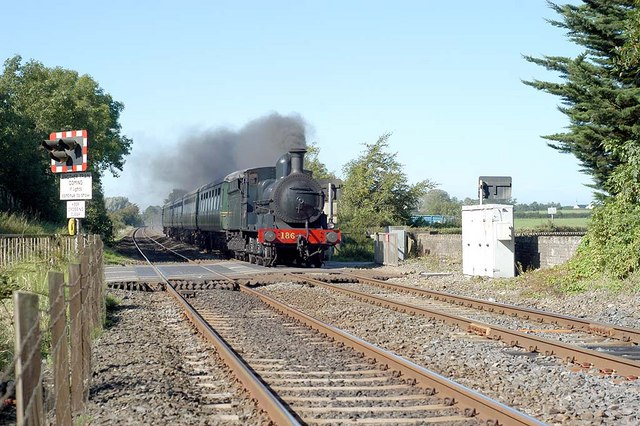
No. 186 passing Drumbane Level Crossing on Northern Ireland Railways metals on a Railway Preservation Society of Ireland service on the Belfast-Dublin railway line.

No. 186, a Sharp, Stewart engine, has a superheated larger boiler with a Belpaire firebox and tender no. 375, a larger 3,345 imperial gallons (15,210 L; 4,017 US gal) tender.

- Class: J15
- Wheels: 0-6-0
- Company: Great Southern & Western Railway
- Designer: Alexander McDonnell
- Builder: Sharp, Stewart & Company, Atlas Works, Manchester (Works No. 2838)
- Dates: Built:1879; Withdrawn:1964
- Boiler: Z
- Boiler diameter: 5 ft 1 3/4 in (1.57 m)
- Cylinders: 18 in × 24 in (457 mm × 610 mm)
- Tractive effort: 17,170 lbf (76.4 kN)
- Total weight: 37.65 long tons (38.25 t; 42.17 short tons)
- Axle load: 13.00 long tons (13.21 t; 14.56 short tons)

=== In film ===
The preserved locomotives have appeared in various films. Most recently, No. 186 appears in the 2006 film, The Wind That Shakes the Barley. Both 184 and 186 appear in the 1979 film, The First Great Train Robbery.
