= GSR Class 800 =

Class of Irish 4-6-0 locomotives

Great Southern Railways 800 Class
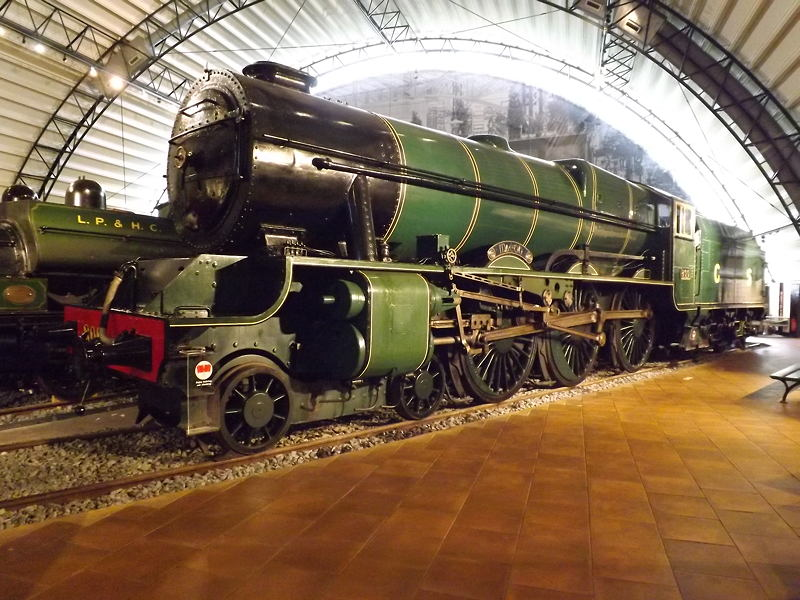
- GSR No. 800 Maeḋḃ
Type and origin
- Power type: Steam
- Designer: E. C. Bredin
- Builder: GSR, Inchicore Works, Dublin
- Build date: 1939–1940
- Total produced: 3
Specifications
- Configuration
  - Whyte: 4-6-0
- Gauge: 5 ft 3 in (1,600 mm)
- Leading dia.: 3 ft 0 in (914 mm)
- Driver dia.: 6 ft 7 in (2,007 mm)
- Axle load: 21 long tons 0 cwt (47,000 lb or 21.3 t); 21 long tons 0 cwt (21.3 t; 23.5 short tons)
- Adhesive weight: 63 long tons 0 cwt (141,100 lb or 64 t); 63 long tons 0 cwt (64.0 t; 70.6 short tons)
- Loco weight: 84 long tons 4 cwt (188,600 lb or 85.6 t); 84 long tons 4 cwt (85.6 t; 94.3 short tons)
- Fuel type: Coal
- Fuel capacity: 8 long tons 0 cwt (17,900 lb or 8.1 t); 8 long tons 0 cwt (8.1 t; 9.0 short tons)
- Water cap.: 5,000 imp gal (22,700 L; 6,000 US gal)
- Firebox
  - Grate area: 33.5 sq ft (3.11 m^{2})
- Boiler pressure: 225 lbf/in^{2} (1,551 kPa), later reduced to 180 lbf/in^{2} (1,241 kPa)
- Heating surface
  - Firebox: 200 sq ft (19 m^{2})
  - Tubes and flues: 1,670 sq ft (155 m^{2})
- Superheater
  - Type: MeLeSCo
  - Heating area: 468 sq ft (43.5 m^{2})
- Cylinders: Three
- Cylinder size: 18.5 in × 28 in (470 mm × 711 mm)
- Valve type: 9 in (229 mm) piston valves
- Valve travel: 6.75 in (171 mm)
- Valve lap: 1.5 in (38 mm)
- Valve lead: 0.3 in (7.6 mm)
Performance figures
- Tractive effort: 34,799 lbf (154.8 kN), later reduced to 27,839 lbf (123.83 kN)
Career
- Operators: Great Southern Railways, → Córas Iompair Éireann
- Class: 800 or B1a
- Numbers: 800–802
- Official name: 800 Maeḋḃ; 801 Maċa; 802 Táilte
- Withdrawn: 1955–1962
- Disposition: One preserved, two scrapped

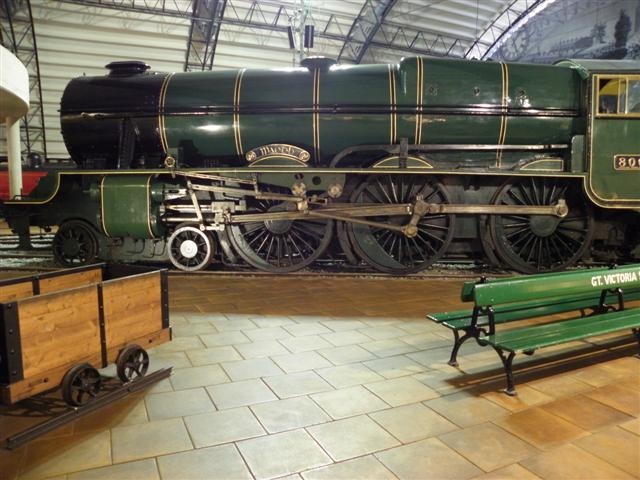
Side view of Maeḋḃ in the museum at Cultra

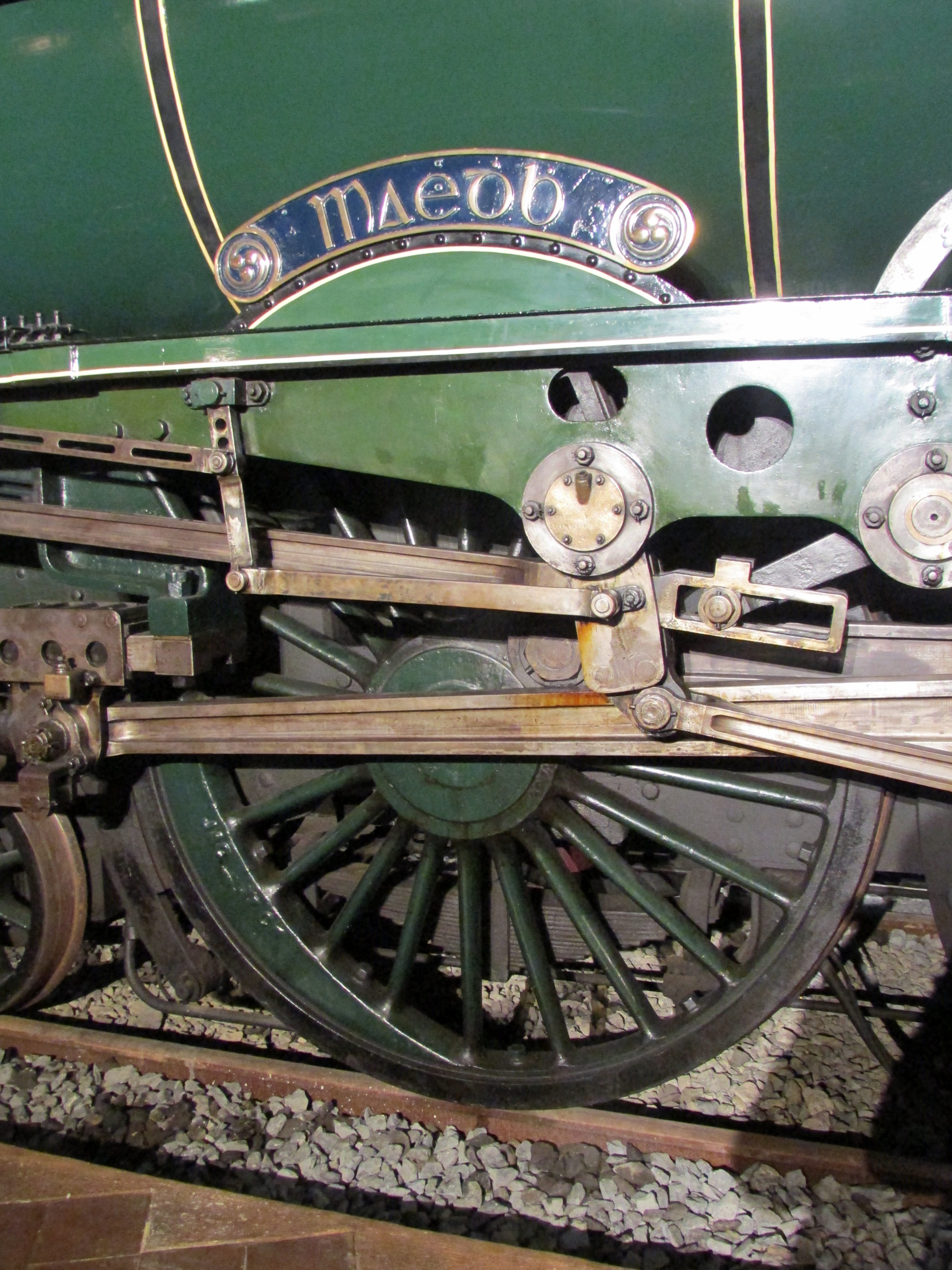
GSR Class 800 "Maeve" wheel and nameplate

The Great Southern Railways Class 800 steam locomotives were built principally for express passenger work on the Dublin to Cork main line of that company. These locomotives were designed under the supervision of E. C. Bredin with his Chief Draughtsman, H. J. A. Beaumont, preparing the drawings. They were the largest and most powerful engines ever to run in Ireland by quite a large margin, and the only three express passenger locomotives to be built in an independent Ireland.

== Design ==
The engines had three 18.5 by 28 inches (470 mm × 711 mm) cylinders and 225 pounds per square inch (1.55 MPa) boiler pressure. The nominal tractive effort was 34,799 lbf (154.8 kN), which corresponded with Great British main-line power. Further, it was the only design which exploited the full extent of the extra width afforded by the 5 ft 3 in (1.60 m) gauge. Originally four or five were to be built, named Maeḋḃ, Maċa, Táilte, Gráinne, and Deirdre, but only three were eventually produced - 800 Maeḋḃ in 1939, with Maċa (801) and Táilte (802) in 1940, along with a fourth boiler which acted as a spare. They were intended for the Dublin–Cork route, but wartime coal shortages and the early 1950s advent of diesels on main line services resulted in their never having had much chance to show what they were capable of. In the 1950s, they gradually became neglected and even resorted to light goods trains on occasion, with little other work to do.

Locomotive names
No.	Built	Irish name	Anglicised name	Withdrawn	Notes
800	1939	Maeḋḃ	Maeve or Maedhbh	1962	Preserved
801	1940	Maċa	Macha	1962	Scrapped
802	1940	Táilte	Tailtiu	1955	Scrapped

The name and number plates were of cast bronze with polished raised lettering and beading on a blue painted background. The nameplates’ lettering was in Gaelic script and used dots (poncanna séimhithe) above lenited letters, although nowadays lenition is denoted through the use of the letter 'h' (see Irish orthography). Locomotive 800 was initially planned to carry an Anglicised name Maeve in Roman type, although it never did.

No. 800 Maeḋḃ was withdrawn from service in 1962 and is now on display at the Ulster Folk and Transport Museum, Cultra, County Down.

== Livery ==
The engines were turned out in a unique livery, which no other locomotives ever carried. In the height of the Great Southern era, when every single locomotive in Ireland was painted in plain unlined battleship grey livery, these engines were turned out in a smart mid-green, with a distinct bluish tint. The green was lined in black and light yellow, and the GSR coat of arms was carried on a raised wooden board on the tender, flanked by large pale yellow letters "G S", which appear to have been shaded in red and gold. The cabside number plates and nameplates had blue backgrounds, and raised polished brass rims and numerals.

In Córas Iompair Éireann days, they received the 1950s standard green, somewhat darker than they had carried before, with black and white lining. In the early 1950s, Táilte was apparently repainted a light green, as an experiment. The colour was not unlike the green used for coaches on CIÉ in the late 1950s, but she was then repainted like her sisters. Maċa and Táilte's nameplates and cab side number plates were given red backgrounds in the mid-1950s instead of the dark blue that they had originally, however Maeḋḃ retained the blue background. This is the livery the preserved 800 carries, though rather than the CIÉ "flying snail" emblem which would be appropriate to this later livery, it incorrectly carries the earlier "G S" without shading, and a replaced GSR coat of arms.

== Service ==
The locos entered service between 1939 and 1940. Their axle load was 21 tons which meant that the Dublin-Cork mainline was the only route available to them. They were noted for climbing the steeply graded route from Cork Kent station (then Glanmire road station) unassisted, but because of coal shortages after WWII they never got a chance to show their full potential. They were slightly modified in the early 1950s with Maċa and Táilte receiving single funnels and all three gaining extra hand-railings and a wheel on the smoke-box door instead of a dart. The main difference following these modifications was a decrease in tractive effort.

With the arrival of the Metropolitan-Vickers A class first generation diesel locomotives in the 1950s, they were made virtually redundant, with Táilte being taken out of service in 1955 and scrapped two years later. However, Maeḋḃ and Maċa remained in service pulling light expresses and goods trains. Maeḋḃ was taken out of service in 1962 and was repainted at Inchicore for preservation. Both Nos. 800 and 801 were noted for being at Thurles in the 1960s after withdrawal. Maċa was retubed for an IRRS tour in 1964 and was steamed up for the last time, after which she was scrapped. Having been at Thurles for a year 800 was brought to the Belfast Museum. In 1993, Maeḋḃ, along with the NCC compound Dunluce Castle and the GNR S class 4-4-0 No. 171 Slieve Gullion were brought to the new Ulster Folk and Transport Museum, Cultra.

== Models ==
An etched-brass 4 mm scale model is available from Studio Scale Models. There is a detailed O Gauge model of engine 800 in the Fry model railway collection.

== See also ==
- Coaching stock of Ireland
- Diesel locomotives of Ireland
- Multiple units of Ireland
- Steam locomotives of Ireland
- History of rail transport in Ireland
