= GS&WR Class 368 =

Class of 4 Irish 2-6-0 locomotives

GS&WR 368 Class
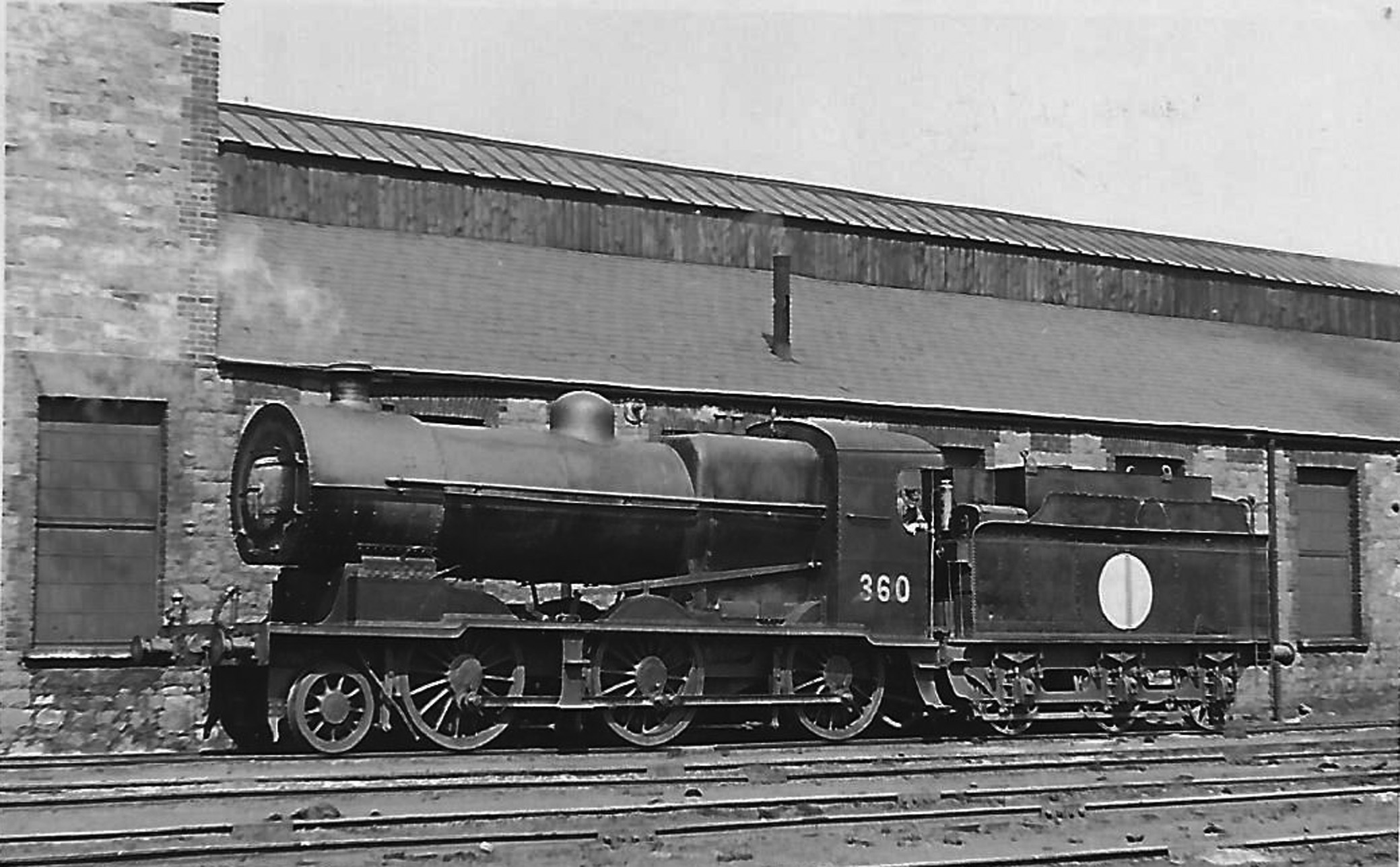
- No. 360 built North British 1903 as 0-6-0, converted 1906 to 2-6-0. Tender roundel indicates oil burning
Type and origin
- Power type: Steam
- Designer: R Coey
- Builder: Inchicore
- Build date: 1909
Specifications
- Configuration
  - Whyte: 2-6-0
- Gauge: 5 ft 3 in (1,600 mm)
- Leading dia.: 3 ft 0 in (910 mm)
- Driver dia.: 5 ft 1 3/4 in (1,568 mm)
- Length: 31 ft 3 3/4 in (9,544 mm)
- Axle load: 15.55 long tons (15.80 t)
- Loco weight: 53.05 long tons (53.90 t)
- Water cap.: 3,345 imp gal (15,210 L; 4,017 US gal)
- Boiler pressure: 160 lbf/in^{2} (1.10 MPa)
- Cylinders: 2
- Cylinder size: 19 in × 26 in (483 mm × 660 mm)
Performance figures
- Tractive effort: 20,680 lbf (91.99 kN)
Career
- Operators: GS&WR; GSR; CIÉ
- Class: K4 (Inchicore)
- Power class: C
- Number in class: 8
- Numbers: 368—371
- Locale: Ireland
- Withdrawn: 1957

The Great Southern and Western Railway (GS&WR) Class 368 consisted of four 2-6-0 tender locomotives designed by Robert Coey for use on heavy freight trains on the main line.

The origins of class 368 lie with rebuilds of GS&WR Class 355. The class 355 consisted of eight locomotives and was designed by Coey as a more powerful version of GS&WR Class 351. They were constructed at the North British Locomotive Company as 0-6-0 due to industrial disputes at Inchicore railway works in 1903. Problems with the design immediately became apparent due to a high axle load of over 16 long tons (16.3 t; 17.9 short tons) resulting in severe route restrictions and propensity to derail due to excessive weight on the front end. The whole class was converted to 2-6-0 moguls between 1906 and 1908 by addition of a leading axle which resolved both the issues of derailing and restrictive axle load. Class 368 was essentially based on the success of this conversion with the driving wheels being moved farther back and closer together.
