= 351 Yrsa =

Main-belt asteroid

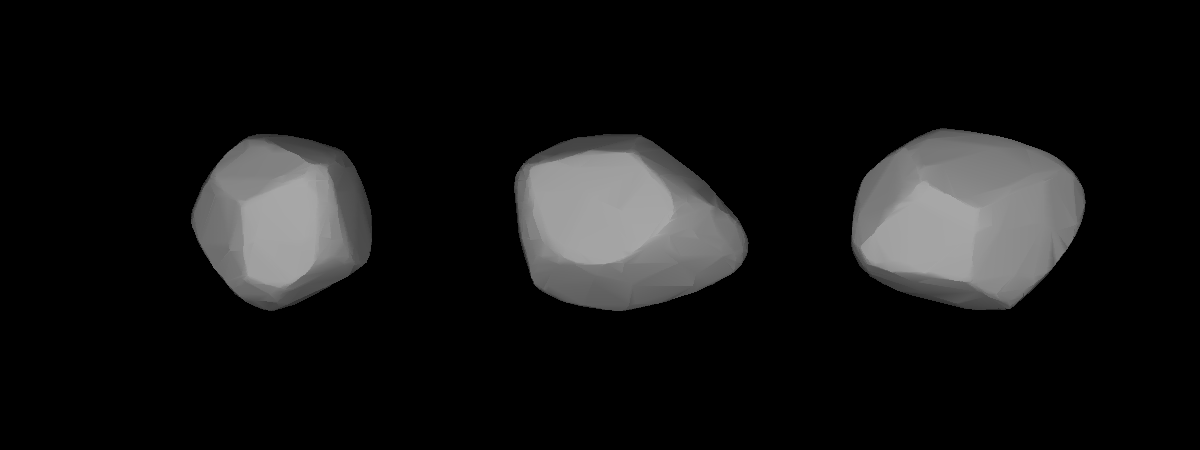
- A three-dimensional model of 351 Yrsa based on its light curve

Discovery
- Discovered by: Max Wolf
- Discovery date: 16 December 1892

Designations
- Named after: Yrsa
- Alternative designations: 1892 V
- Minor planet category: Main belt

Orbital characteristics
- Epoch 31 July 2016 (JD 2457600.5)
- Uncertainty parameter 0
- Observation arc: 122.97 yr (44913 d)
- Aphelion: 3.18936 AU (477.121 Gm)
- Perihelion: 2.34512 AU (350.825 Gm)
- Semi-major axis: 2.76724 AU (413.973 Gm)
- Eccentricity: 0.15254
- Orbital period (sidereal): 4.60 yr (1681.4 d)
- Mean anomaly: 279.834°
- Mean motion: 0° 12^{m} 50.792^{s} / day
- Inclination: 9.19482°
- Longitude of ascending node: 99.2557°
- Argument of perihelion: 31.5661°

Physical characteristics
- Dimensions: 39.59±2.2 km
- Synodic rotation period: 13.29 h (0.554 d)
- Geometric albedo: 0.2884±0.034
- Absolute magnitude (H): 8.98

351 Yrsa is a typical Main belt asteroid. It was discovered by Max Wolf on 16 December 1892 in Heidelberg.
