= O. S. Nock =

British railway signal engineer and writer

Oswald Stevens Nock
- Born: 21 January 1905; Sutton Coldfield, England
- Died: 21 September 1994 (aged 89); Bath, England
- Education: Giggleswick School
- Occupation: Signalling engineer
- Known for: Railway author
- Spouse: Olivia Ravenall

Oswald Stevens Nock, B. Sc., DIC, C. Eng, M.I.C.E., M.I.Mech.E., M.I.Loco.E., (21 January 1905 – 29 September 1994), nicknamed Ossie, was a British railway signal engineer and senior manager at the Westinghouse company; he is well known for his prodigious output of popularist publications on railway subjects, including over 100 books, as well as many more technical works on locomotive performance.

He wrote articles on railway signalling and locomotive performance for The Engineer researched during World War II, and from 1958 to 1980 he succeeded Cecil J. Allen as the author of the "British locomotive practice and performance" series published in The Railway Magazine.

== Biography ==
Oswald Stevens Nock was born 21 January 1905 in Sutton Coldfield, Warwickshire, the son of a bank employee, Samuel James Nock, and a schoolteacher Rose Amy née Stevens. In early childhood Nock's father became manager of a bank branch in Reading; O.S. Nock was subsequently educated at Marlborough House, and Reading School. After the family moved to Barrow in Furness in 1916 he became a boarder at Giggleswick School. In 1921 he enrolled at the City and Guilds Engineering College, in London, and obtained a degree in engineering in 1924, and joined the Westinghouse Brake and Signal Company in 1925.

Recession during the 1930s (see Great Depression in the United Kingdom) led Nock to seek other forms of income, and after having taken a correspondence course in journalism, began to submit articles to magazines. His first submission was a technical paper on railways submitted to the Institution of Mechanical Engineers. In 1932 he had his first works accepted for publication: the first was an article "Carlisle, a Station of Changes" published in January 1932 in The Railway Magazine, also in 1932 the London Evening News bought and published an article written as part of his journalism correspondence course: "Hyde Park's ghost trains"; Due to his moonlighting as a journalist, he published under pseudonyms including "C.K.S", "C.K. Stevens" or "Railway Engineer".

In his early writing career Nock also had published photographic articles on landscapes and regions, published by non-railway publications. A commission for The Star newspaper enabled him to ride on the footplate of a LMS express locomotive in 1934, subsequently he regularly submitted information on locomotive performance to The Railway Magazine.

Nock married Olivia Hattie née Ravenall (1913–1987) in 1937. He had met her in King's Cross railway station where she was assistant manageress of the Georgian Tea Rooms. By 1939 Nock was successful as a both a popular and technical railway author – he received a commission by The Engineer at the beginning of the Second World War to produce a series of articles on railway signalling, and on locomotive performance under wartime conditions.

After World War II Nock rose through the Westinghouse organisation to become chief brake draughtsman (1945), four years later chief draughtsman; during the British Rail modernisation plan (1955) Nock managed the expansion of the company's drawing office, and in 1957 became the company's chief mechanical engineer. Nock's first published book was Locomotives of Sir Nigel Gresley published 1945, and based on an earlier series of ten articles in The Railway Magazine; he became a regular author of publishers David and Charles and Ian Allan in the post war boom, publishing on average two books per year whilst working at Westinghouse. In 1959 he took over the writing of the "British locomotive practice and performance" reports for The Railway Magazine from Cecil J. Allen, publishing 264 articles between then and 1980.

In 1967 he was a passenger on a train involved in a derailment near Didcot in which one person was killed. The carriage where he was sitting overturned, but he escaped without injury, and later wrote of his experience in his book Historic Railway Disasters. He had previously seen the aftermath of another fatal railway accident at Reading in 1914 as a schoolboy.

In 1969 Nock became president of the Institution of Railway Signal Engineers (IRSE). After retiring in 1970 his output rose to five books per year, including a three volume work on 20th century British locomotives, and eight volumes on the railways of regions of the world.

In addition to his interests in all things railway, Nock's interests included photography, painting, as well as railway modelling.

His wife Olivia died in 1987. He died 21 September 1994.

=== Legacy ===
Nock authored more than 140 books and 1000 magazine articles, although some of the work represented duplication from his own oeuvre, as well as containing repetition or padding within the text. Much of his work showed a bias towards locomotive performance issues; his most authoritative work was on that subject and on signalling. As a writer his output is considered accessible, uncontroversial, and empathic to the subject he wrote upon, and rich in personal anecdotes, though some feel his historical work and research was weak.

His better writing has been highly praised:

... it becomes clear how a good a writer he was – clear, straightforward sentences coupled with the ability to explain technical matters in simple terms.

— Michael Rutherford, Backtrack.

== Partial bibliography ==
=== Books ===
Signalling

- Nock, O.S. (1962), 50 Years of Railway Signalling, IRSE
- Nock, O.S. (1969), British Railway Signalling, Unwin
- Nock, O.S., ed. (1980), Railway Signalling – A treatise on the recent practice of British Railways, A & C Black / IRSE

Locomotives and performance

- Nock, O.S. (1945), The Locomotives of Sir Nigel Gresley
- Nock, O.S. (1957), Steam Locomotive
- Nock, O.S. (1966), The British Steam Railway Locomotive (Volume 2 From 1925 to 1965), Ian Allan London
- Nock, O.S. (1972), Speed Records on Britain's Railways, David & Charles, ISBN 0-330-23365-3
- Nock, O.S. (1974), Electric Euston to Glasgow (1st ed.), London: Ian Allan, ISBN 0-7110-0530-3
- Nock, O.S. (1980), The GWR Stars, Castles and Kings: Part 1 1906-1930, Newton Abbot: David & Charles
- Nock, O.S. (1982), British Locomotives of the 20th Century, vol. 1, 2, & 3

Railways

- Nock, O.S.; Cross, Derek (1960), Main Lines Across the Border (1st ed.), London: Nelson, OCLC 12273673, Revised edition (1982) ISBN 0-7110-1118-4, OCLC 11622324
- Nock, O.S. (1960), The London & North Western Railway, London: Ian Allan
- Nock, O.S. (1961), The South Eastern & Chatham Railway
- Nock, O.S. (1962), British Steam Railways
- Nock, O.S. (1963), Continental Main Lines, George Allan & Unwin, London (German translation: Europas grosse Bahnlinien, Orell Fuessli Zurich 1964)
- Nock, O.S. (1964), The Great Western Railway in the Twentieth Century, Ian Allan
- Nock, O.S., The Caledonian Railway (1st ed.), London: Ian Allan, OCLC 366646513, 2nd edition (1964) OCLC 21002535, 3rd edition (1973) ISBN 0-7110-0408-0 OCLC 16232981
- Nock, O.S. (1966), Britain's New Railway, London: Ian Allan
- Nock, O.S. (1966), Steam Railways in Retrospect, London: A & C Black
- Nock, O.S. (1968), North Western A history of the L.N.W.R.
- Nock, O.S. (1968), The Railway Enthusiasts Encyclopedia, Hutchinson, ISBN 0-09-903310-0
- Nock, O.S. (1975), The Pre-grouping Scene, No.1: The Great Western, Surrey: Ian Allan, ISBN 0-7110-0586-9
- Nock, O.S. (1978), World Atlas of Railways, New York: Mayflower Books, ISBN 0-8317-9500-X original publisher: Artists House, London
- Nock, O.S. (1979), The Limited, George Allen & Unwin, ISBN 0-04-385073-1
- Nock, O.S. (1982), A History of the LMS, vol. 1. The First Years, 1923–1930, George Allen & Unwin
- Nock, O.S. (1982), A History of the LMS, vol. 2. The Record-Breaking 'Thirties, 1931–1939', George Allen & Unwin
- Nock, O.S. (1983), A History of the LMS, vol. 3. The War Years and Nationalisation, 1939–1948', George Allen & Unwin
- Nock, O.S. (1985), Great British Trains
- Nock, O.S. (1966), Historic Railway Disasters (1st ed.)
  - Nock, O.S.; Cooper, B.K. (1987) [1966], Historic Railway Disasters (4th ed.), Shepperton: Ian Allan, ISBN 0-7110-1752-2
- Nock, O.S. (1964), Sir William Stanier: An Engineering Biography, London: Ian Allan

==== Autobiography ====
- Nock, O.S. (1976), Out the line, London: Paul Elek, ISBN 0236400703
- Nock, O.S. (1982a), Line clear ahead: 75 years of ups and downs
- Nock, O.S. (1993a), Another Facet of an Autobiography, Pentland Press, ISBN 1858210887

=== Articles and monographs ===
Signalling

- Nock, O.S. (1943), "Modern Railway Signalling Practice in America", The Engineer, 176, in four parts: No.I, 27 August, pp. 162–165; No.II, 3 September, pp. 190–193; No.III, 10 September, pp. 202–205; No.IV, 17 September, pp. 228–231 (Note: See also "Modern Railway Signalling Practice", The Engineer, 168, 1939, in four parts: Pt.I, 8 December, pp. 564–566; Pt.II, 15 December, pp. 582–583; Pt.III, 22 December, pp. 608–610; Pt.IV, 29 December, pp. 632–634 (unattributed))
- Nock, O.S. (14 November 1947), "Continuously Controlled Cab Signalling" (PDF), The Engineer, 184: 454–456
- Nock, O.S., "Railway Signalling Developments: 1923–48", The Engineer, 187, in four parts: No.I, 13 May 1949, pp. 518–521, No.II, 20 May 1949, pp. 546–548, No. III, 27 May 1949, pp. 574–578, No. IV, 3 June 1949, pp. 602–605

Locomotives and performance

- Nock, O.S. (1942), "French Locomotive Performances", The Engineer, 173, in two parts: No.I, 6 February, pp. 110–113; No.II, 13 February, pp. 132–134
- Nock, O.S., "British Locomotive Working in Wartime", The Engineer
  - The G.W.R. "Castle Class", Part I (PDF), vol. 180, 17 August 1945, pp. 122–125, archived from the original (PDF) on 3 February 2014
  - The G.W.R. "Castle Class", Part II (PDF), vol. 180, 24 August 1945, pp. 144–146, archived from the original (PDF) on 3 February 2014
  - The L.M.S.R "Jubilee" Class, 4-6-0, vol. 181: Part I, 26 April 1946, pp. 374–375, Part II, 3 May 1946, pp. 398–399
  - The L.M.S.R. "Converted Royal Scot" Class, 4-6-0, vol. 181–2: Part I, 24 May 1946, pp. 466–467, Part II, 31 May 1946, pp. 490–491, Part III, 19 July 1946, pp. 60–62
- Nock, O.S., "Present Day Locomotive Working in Great Britain", The Engineer
  - The L.N.E.R 2-6-2 "Green Arrow" Class (PDF), vol. 182, 11 October 1946, pp. 314–316
  - The L.M.S.R. "Coronation" Class Pacifics, vol. 182: Part I, 13 December 1946, pp. 532–534, Part II, 20 December 1946, pp. 558–559
  - The G.W.R. Oil-fired 4-6-0's, vol. 185: Part I, 6 February 1948, pp. 128–130, Part II, 13 February 1948, pp. 152–154
  - The Mixed Traffic 4-6-0s, vol. 188
    - Part I.: The G.W.R. "Hall" Class. 4 November 1949, pp. 514–517,
    - Part II: The Ex-L.M.S.R. Class "5". 11 November 1949, pp. 543–546
    - Part III: The Ex-L.N.E.R. "B.1" Class. 18 November 1949, pp. 573–576
    - Part IV: The G.W.R. "County" Class. 25 November 1949, pp. 600–603
  - The Western Region "Castle" Class, vol. 188:Part I, 20 April 1951, pp. 501–503, Part II, 27 April 1951, pp. 535–539
  - First Results from the "Britannias" (PDF), vol. 193, 4 April 1952, pp. 458–560
  - The Gresley "Pacifics" on the East Coast Route, vol. 194: Part I, 18 July 1952, pp. 77–80, Part II, 25 July 1952, pp. 115–117
  - The Thompson and Peppercorn "Pacifics" of the former L.N.E.R, vol. 195: Part I, 29 May 1953, pp. 754–756, Part II, 5 June 1953, pp. 786-
  - The "King" Class 4-6-0s of the former G.W.R, vol. 196: Part I, 10 July 1953, pp. 34–36, Part II, 17 July 1953, pp. 66–68
  - King's Cross-Edinburgh non-stop expresses, vol. 198: Part 1, 2 July 1954, pp. 2–4, Part II, 9 July 1954, pp. 38–41
  - The "Britannia's" in East Anglia, vol. 198: Part 1, 20 August 1954, pp. 268–270, part II, 27 August 1954, pp. 284–286
- Nock, O.S., "Performance of 2000 H.P. Main-Line Diesel-Electric Locomotive", The Engineer, 201 No.I, 25 May 1956, pp. 550–553, No.II, 1 June 1956, pp. 588–591
- Nock, O.S. (20 October 1950), "The L.M.S. Mobile Test Plant in Action" (PDF), The Engineer, 190: 377–379:
- Nock, O.S. (25 May 1951), "The "Britannia" Class Locomotives on Test" (PDF), The Engineer, 191: 691–693
- Nock, O.S. (13 July 1951), "Western Region Gas Turbine Locomotive in Service" (PDF), The Engineer, 192: 40–41
- Nock, O.S., "British Locomotive Performance and Efficiency Tests", The Engineer, 193–4: No.I, 13 June 1952, pp. 788–790, No.II, 20 June 1952, pp. 817–820, No.III, 4 July 1952, pp. 29–31, No.IV, 11 July 1952, pp. 62–64
- Nock, O.S., "Performance and Efficiency Tests on the "Britannia" Locomotives", The Engineer, 196 No.I, 24 July 1953, pp. 103–104, No.II, 31 July 1953, pp. 136–138
- Nock, O.S., "Performance and Efficiency Tests on S.R. Diesel Electric Locomotive", The Engineer, 196 No.I, 2 October 1953, pp. 424–427, No.II, 9 October 1953, pp. 451–453
- Nock, O.S., "Improving Modern Locomotive Performance", The Engineer, 197 No.I, 5 February 1953, pp. 202–205, No.II, 12 February 1954, pp. 236–239
- Nock, O.S. (4 February 1955), "Improving Locomotive Performance – Recent trials with the E. and N.E. Region "V2" class" (PDF), The Engineer, 199: 150–153
- Nock, O.S., "Factors in the Working of a High-Speed Train Service", The Engineer, 200 No.I, 15 July 1955, pp. 66–68, No.II, 22 July 1955, pp. 102–104
- Nock, O.S., "'Merchant Navy' Class Locomotives – Performance and Efficiency Tests", The Engineer, 200 No.I, 4 November 1955, pp. 644–646, No.II, 11 November 1955, pp. 680–682
- Nock, O.S., "Heavy Express Locomotive Trials on the Western Region", The Engineer, 203 No.I, 12 April 1957, pp. 560–562, No.II, 19 April 1957, pp. 594–597
- Nock, O.S., "Performance and Efficiency Tests on B.R. Class "8" Locomotive", The Engineer, 204 No.I, 23 August 1957, pp. 258–261, No.II, 30 August 1957, pp. 292–294
- Nock, O.S. (11 July 1958), "Performance and Efficiency Tests on the 3300 h.p. "Deltic" Locomotive" (PDF), The Engineer, 206: 60–63
- Nock, O.S. (9 October 1959), "2-10-0 Standard Freight Locomotive Performance and Efficiency Tests" (PDF), The Engineer, 208: 383–386
- Nock, O.S. (10 June 1960), ""Merchant Navy" Locomotives Performance and Efficiency Tests on Southern Region" (PDF), The Engineer, 209: 975–979, archived from the original (PDF) on 4 March 2014
