= Inchicore railway works =

Ireland's major rail engineering facility, in Dublin

Inchicore Railway Works
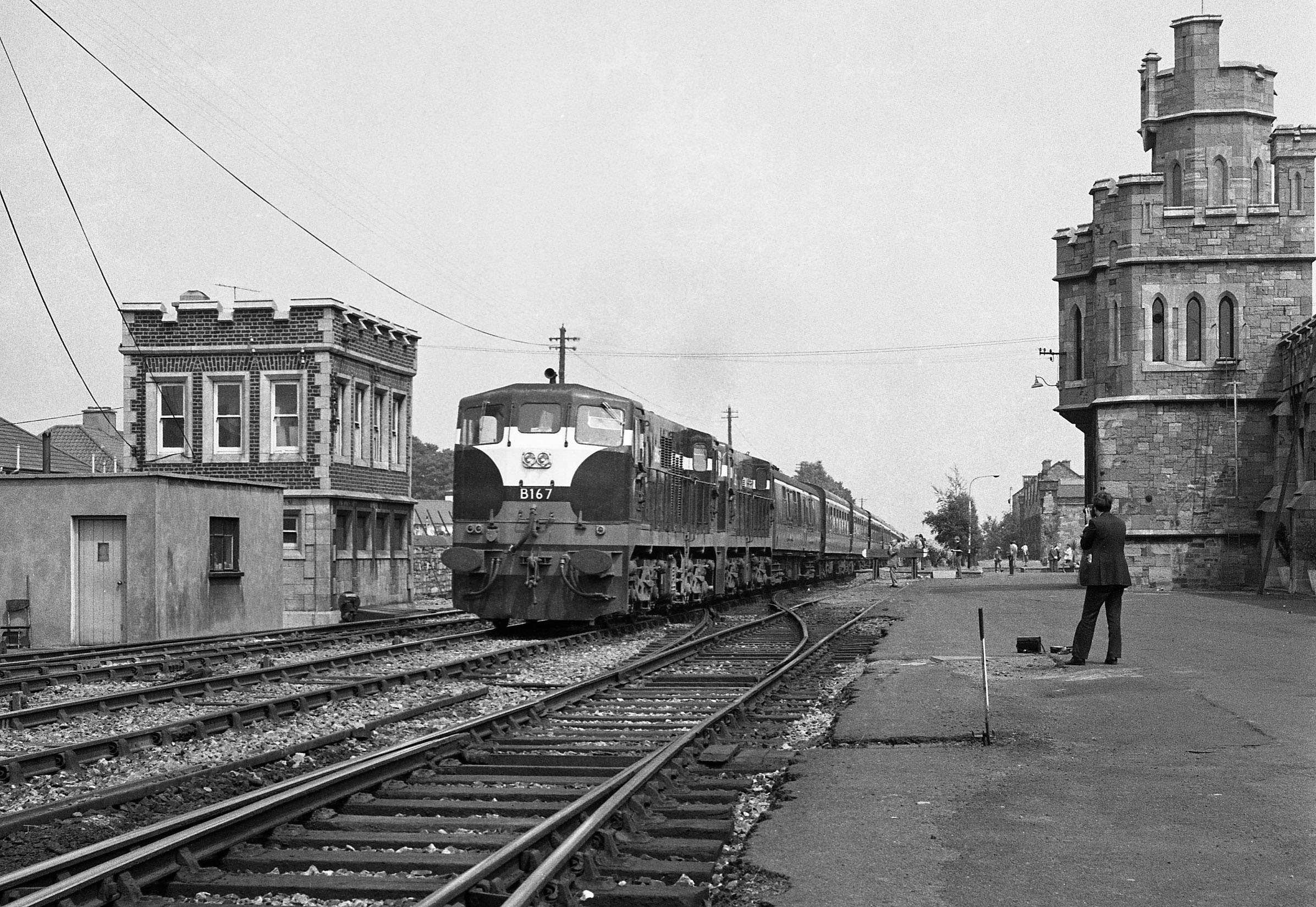
- Train passing Inchicore railway works in 1975
- Operated: Since 1846
- Location: Inchicore, Dublin, Ireland
- Coordinates: 53.3403°N 6.3274°W
- Industry: Rail transport
- Area: 73 acres (30 ha)
- Owners: GS&WR (1844-1924); Great Southern (1925-1944); CIÉ (1945-1987); Irish Rail (1987-present)

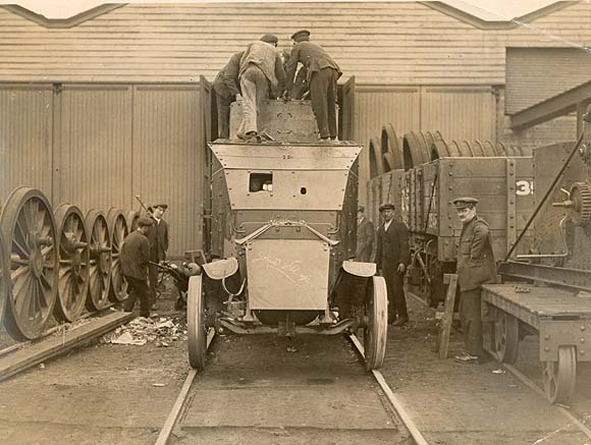
Armoured train at Inchicore Works 1922

Inchicore railway works, also known locally as 'Inchicore' or 'The Works', was founded by the Great Southern and Western Railway in 1846 and emerged to become the major engineering centre for railways in Ireland. Located c. 3 km west of Dublin city centre, the works cover an area of approximately 73 acres (300,000 m^{2}).

The works are responsible for the overhaul, repair, servicing, spraying and washing of locomotives and rolling stock. In the past, the manufacture, assembly and rebuild of locomotives and rolling stock have been performed at Inchicore.

== History ==
When the works were opened in 1846, there were a total of 39 people employed at the facility. The locomotive erecting shop had 18 pits on one side and 16 on the other. By 1886, the works had expanded to 52 acres. In 1934 the erecting shop was replaced by a building with roads. In 1976 the works employed over one thousand people and were 72 acres in size.

== Site ==
The works are situated alongside and to the south of the Dublin to Cork main line about 3 kilometres (1.9 mi) out of Heuston (formerly Kingsbridge) station. The line also serves Waterford, Limerick, Athlone, Galway and Ballina. The Dublin to Belfast, Sligo and Wexford lines and North Wall complex can be reached via a link line near Heuston station.

Besides the works which are used for overhauls and heavy repairs the site also contains a depot for the regular maintenance of locomotives and carriages.

A small stream, sometimes known as the "Creosote Stream" owing to pollutants from the works in earlier times, rises west of the works, runs through the site, and joins the River Liffey close to the Irish National War Memorial Gardens. The stream divides into various branches which flow beneath the railway works. The outdoor lavatories of the railway works were previously placed directly above one of these watercourses.

== Engineering achievements ==
In addition to building and maintaining trains, locomotives, buses, and trucks, the works achieved a number of notable engineering accomplishments. These included "armoured vehicles, armour-plated trains, experimental battery trains, turf-burning locomotives [and] munitions".

Whilst Inchicore did not initially build locomotives, by 1851, with the expertise by then accumulated, the GS&WR board felt this was now practicable and in 1852 the first locomotive, an 0-4-2 number 57, entered service.

In the 1920s and 1930s, in conjunction with James J. Drumm, engineers at the works created the "Drumm Battery Train" using electric storage batteries. These ran generally on services to Bray in the period 1931-1949.

Issues with the supply of quality coal from 1941 precipitated some experiments with turf burning and other initiatives. Further coal supply issues in 1946 resulted in a conversion of a number of locomotives to oil burning in 1947 and 1948. Increased availability of coal, and issues with oil prices, led to these being converted back to coal from 1948. In 1957, despite the dieselisation programme then being underway, an experimental turf burning locomotive, CIÉ No. CC1, was constructed but never entered full service. It was the last steam locomotive constructed at Inchicore and the last steam locomotive constructed for the commercial railways of Ireland.

In 1951, the CIÉ 113 Class was built at the works. These were the first mainline diesel locomotives in Ireland.

== Proposed site developments ==
Originally proposed in 1972, revised plans for the DART Underground project suggested that a DART station be built within the Inchicore works site. The specifics of these plans were subject to some local opposition, and, as of 2018, the project was not funded or scheduled.

== Preservation ==
Rolling stock, associated with Inchicore railway works and preserved, include examples of:

- GS&WR Class 90 - No. 90 is preserved at the Downpatrick and County Down Railway
- GS&WR Class 101 - No. 184 is preserved at the Railway Preservation Society of Ireland
- GSR Class 800 - No. 800 "Maeḋḃ" is preserved at the Ulster Folk and Transport Museum

== See also ==
- Dundalk Railway Works
