= Diesel locomotives of Ireland =

Although prototype diesel locomotives ran in Britain before World War II, the railways of both the Republic and Northern Ireland changed over much more rapidly from steam to diesel traction than those in Britain, due to the island's limited coal reserves and (in the Republic) an ageing steam locomotive fleet.

Northern Ireland operated several diesel shunters as early as the 1930s. CIÉ's first diesels consisted of five shunters built by CIÉ in 1947/48. The initial two diesel mainline locomotives were also built in Inchicore, in 1950/51, and fitted with Sulzer engines and MV traction equipment. This was followed in the mid-1950s with a large order from Britain fitted with Crossley engines, with notably poor results. From the early 1960s, locomotives with more reliable engines from General Motors Electro-Motive Division were adopted. In the late 1960s the Crossley engines were replaced by EMD 645 units in a major re-enginging programme. Since the early 1960s all new locomotives on the two Irish rail systems have been purchased from EMD, with the exception of three from Hunslet Engine Company of Leeds, England, for NIR in 1970.

== Ireland ==
=== Mass dieselisation ===
In 1948, CIÉ commissioned a report from Sir James Milne (General Manager of the British Great Western Railway) on the problems of upgrading its rail services. Despite his recommendation to continue with steam traction, CIÉ decided to push for the complete dieselisation of its railway system, expecting substantial economies of scale.

The first of the two mainline diesel locomotives built by CIÉ at Inchicore Works, each with a Sulzer engine built by Vickers Armstrong, Class 113, entered service in April 1950, following completion of trials.

Subsequently, CIÉ placed one of the largest orders of its time, for 94 locomotives (60 Metro-Vick Class 001, or A Class, and 34 201 Class, or C Class locomotives) with a consortium of four British companies:

- Diesel engines from Crossley. The engine used in the A Class was the Crossley HST V8 of 1,200 horsepower (895 KW), relatively untested for railway use although the same engine was used in the 48 Western Australian Government Railways X and XA class locomotives built by Metropolitan Vickers in 1954-6 and the small build of 20 Type 2 Co-Bo locomotives for British Railways (later British Rail Class 28) of 1958–9
- Mechanicals from Metropolitan Cammell
- Electrical components from both the English Steel Corp. and the Metropolitan-Vickers Electrical Co.

Delivered to Inchicore Works between 1955 and 1958, the Class 001 was to become the mainstay of mainline passenger and freight services on the network for the next forty years. Parts were also ordered for a further 19 locos to be built at Inchicore Works.

From the outset, the two-stroke Crossley engines proved under-powered and unreliable. The 001s were not capable of reliably handling mainline work, while the Class 201, no longer required on branch line work due to Todd Andrews's large scale closures, were unsuited to mainline work because of their low power (c.600 hp).

=== The General Motors influence ===
From the early 60s, CIÉ looked to GM, with their history of reliability. 15 121 Class were purchased in 1961. These were modified shunting locos ("switchers") and proved an instant success. One drawback was the single cab construction requiring the loco to be turned at the end of each journey as the drivers refused to operate them "long hood" forward. They were modified in the mid-1970s for multiple unit operation and operated in consist, "long hood" to "long hood", with their cabs at each end. 37 141 Class, delivered in 1962, were fitted with two cabs to overcome this problem. The delivery of these engines brought an end to regular steam working in April 1963. A third batch of GM locomotives (181 Class) were delivered in 1966, which were essentially 141s with more powerful engines.

Having experienced GM's reliability, CIÉ decided in 1964 to fit higher-powered engines in both Class 001 and Class 201 locos. However, GM would only sell complete engine / generator assemblies and would not provide engines on their own. They finally agreed in 1967 to supply engines to enable re-engining of the Class 001. This was the first time that GM supplied engines for such purposes. The trials were a total success and over the next four years, all 94 Metrovicks were fitted with replacement EMD 645 engines.

Eighteen new GM locomotives were delivered in 1977. Visually resembling a stretched 141/181 Class, the new locomotives had a Co-Co wheel arrangement and were of significantly higher power, 2,475 h.p. The 071 Class with its higher speed and power went on to become the principal passenger locomotive on the Irish railway network for the next twenty years. The new 201 Class, again built by GM, superseded them in 1994–1995. These are currently the heaviest, fastest and most powerful diesel locomotives operating in Ireland (112 tons, max. speed 102 mph and 3,200 hp).

=== Classification ===
Initially, CIÉ numbered and classified its handful of early diesel locomotives in the same way as steam. However, it soon developed a series based on engine power Types, with the highest-powered locomotives being Type A and numbered in the Axx series, and the lowest powered being Type G and numbered in the G6xx series. Locomotive K801, ex GNRB, was a one-off prototype and did not truly fit in this scheme.

Since all the locomotives were in fact numbered in series, the letter prefix was dropped in 1972, as was the allocation of numbers according to power. Locomotives rebuilt with higher-powered engines were not renumbered, later locomotives simply taking the next available number series.

In the early to mid-1980s, locomotives started to be designated with the letters S and/or A after their number. For example, 124 was renumbered 124SA.

The "S" indicated that the locomotive had been fitted with Continuous Automatic Warning System (CAWS), an in-cab system that displays the aspect of the next signal. Locomotives not fitted with CAWS had restrictions imposed on their use.

The suffix "A" indicated that the locomotive's air brakes had been commissioned. Until the introduction of the Mark 3, all Irish coaching stock used vacuum brakes but all locomotives since the 121 Class had also been equipped with air braking, albeit never commissioned. Only those whose air brakes were commissioned could haul the new coaches.

The suffix letters were dropped once all locomotives had their air brakes commissioned and been fitted with CAWS, and numbering continued as before.

== Northern Ireland ==
A variety of small classes of diesel locomotives have operated on railways in Northern Ireland. From 2001, most items of rolling stock in use on NIR had 8000 added to their number so as to be part of the Translink number series, which also incorporates their road vehicles.

Belfast and County Down Railway (1848–1948)

- 2
- 28 (later used by NCC)

Northern Counties Committee (1903–1948)

- 17 (Designated Class X)
- 22

Northern Ireland Railways (since 1967)

- DH class: Numbers 1–3
- DL class: Numbers 101–103
- MV class: Numbers 104–109
- GM class: Numbers 111–113
- 201 class: Numbers 208–209

== Republic of Ireland ==
Image	Class	Type	Image	Class	Type
	001 Class	Numbers 001–060 (Type A)		071 Class:	Numbers 071–088
	101 Class:	Numbers 101–112 (Type B)		113 Class:	Numbers 113–114 (Type B)
	121 Class	Numbers 121–135 (Type B)		141 Class	Numbers 141–177 (Type B)
	181 Class	Numbers 181–192 (Type B)		201 Class:	Numbers 201–234 (Type C)(Type B re-engined)
	301 Class	Numbers 301–305 (Type D)		401 Class	Numbers 401–419 (Type E)
	421 Class	Numbers 421–434 (Type E)		501 Class	Numbers 501–503 (Type F)
	601 Class	Numbers 601–603 (Type G)		611 Class:	Numbers 611–617 (Type G)
	801 Class	Number 801 (Type K)		GM 201 Class	Numbers 201–207 & 210–234

== Preserved locomotives ==
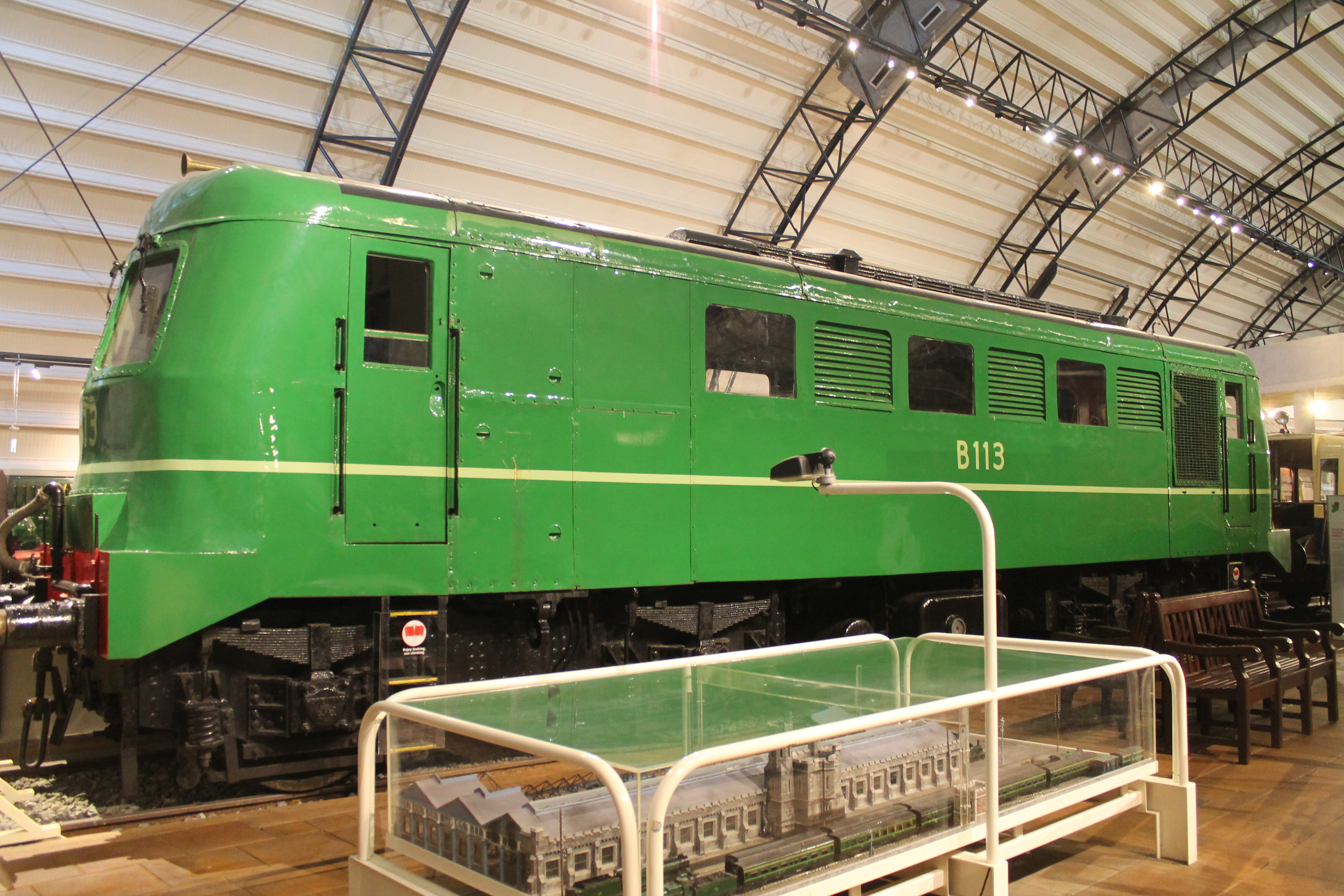
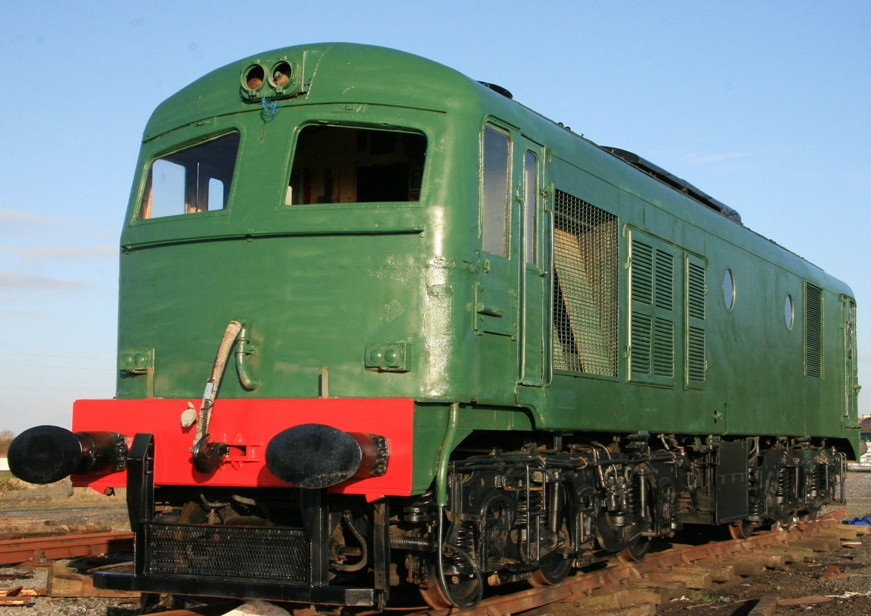
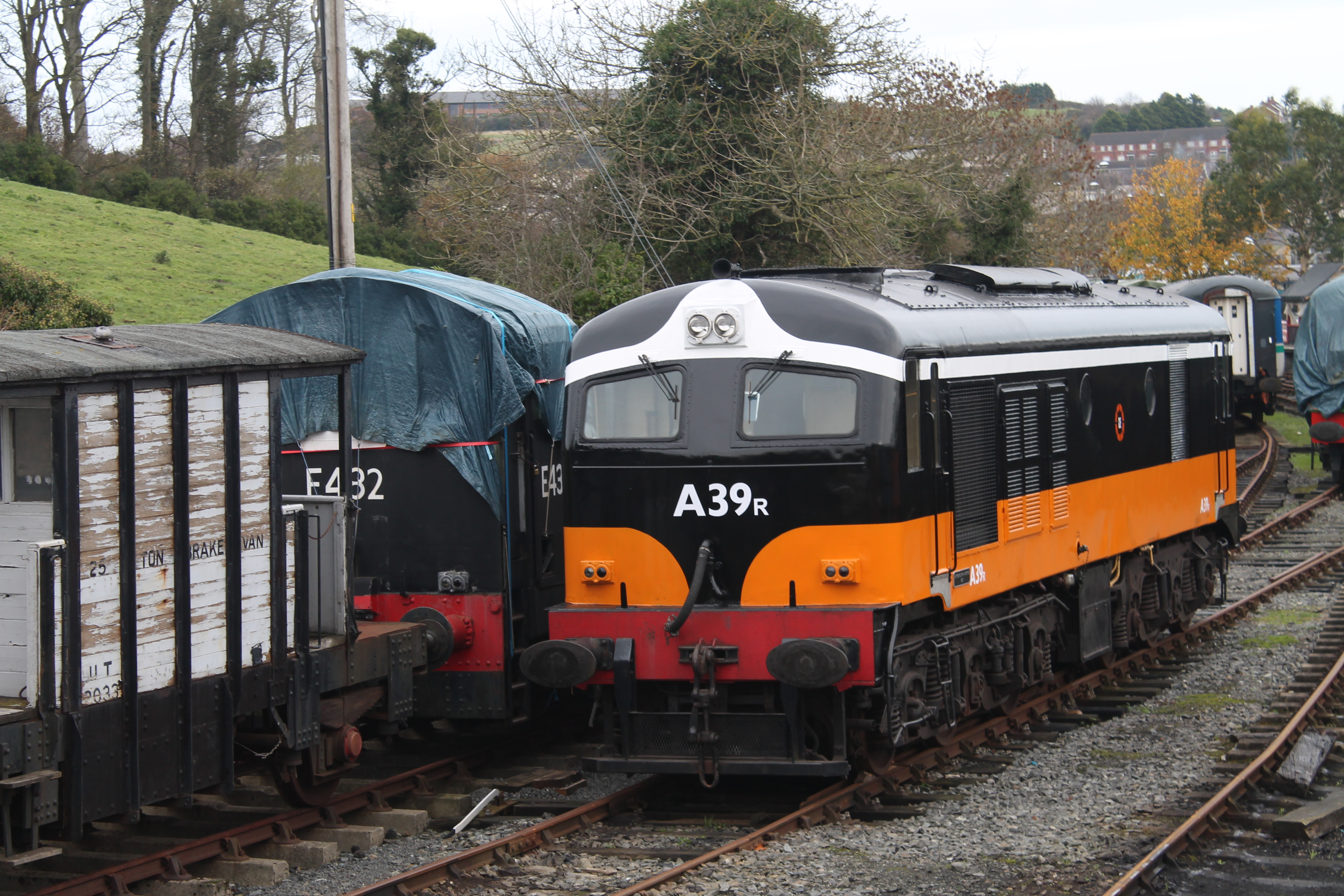
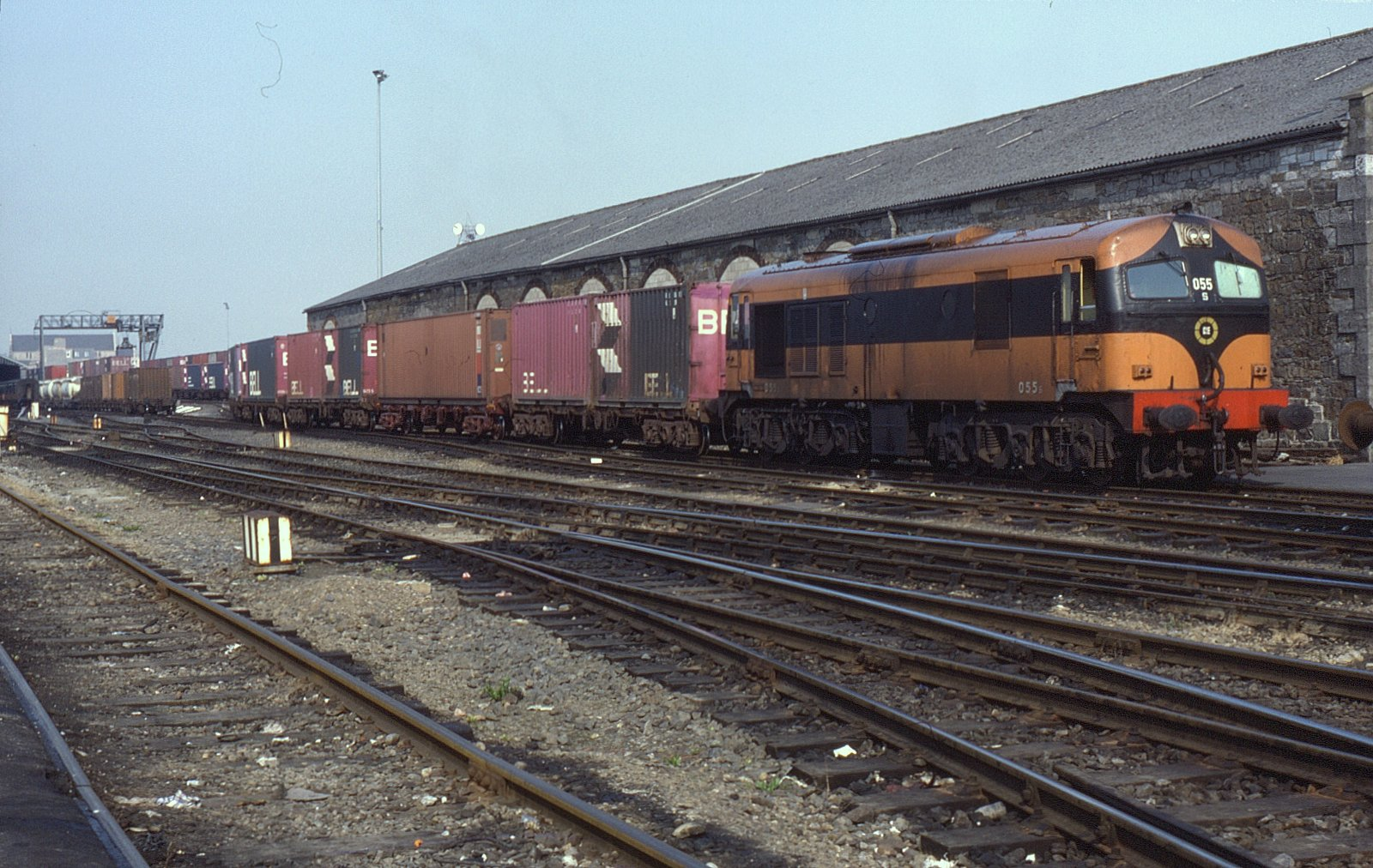
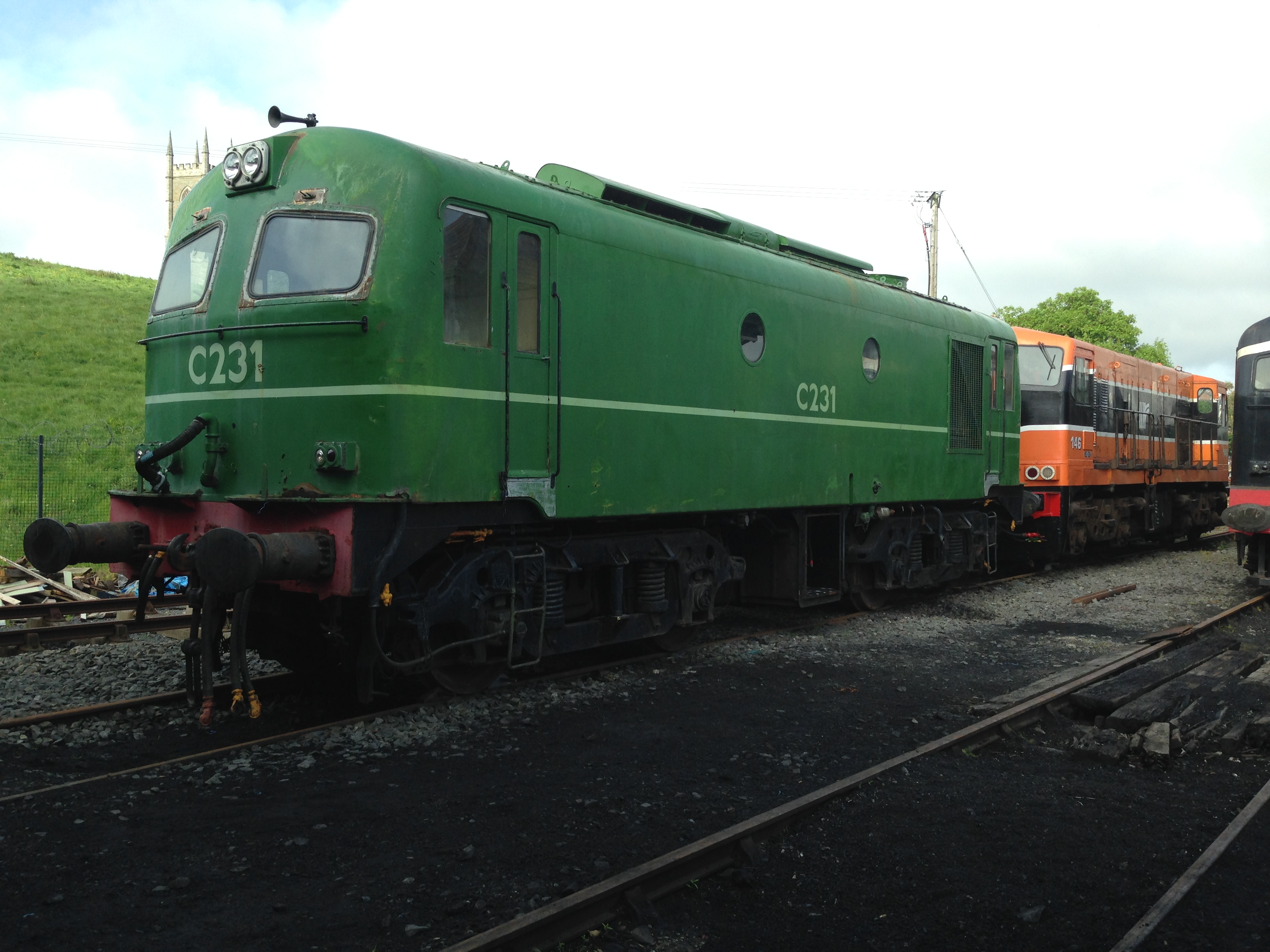
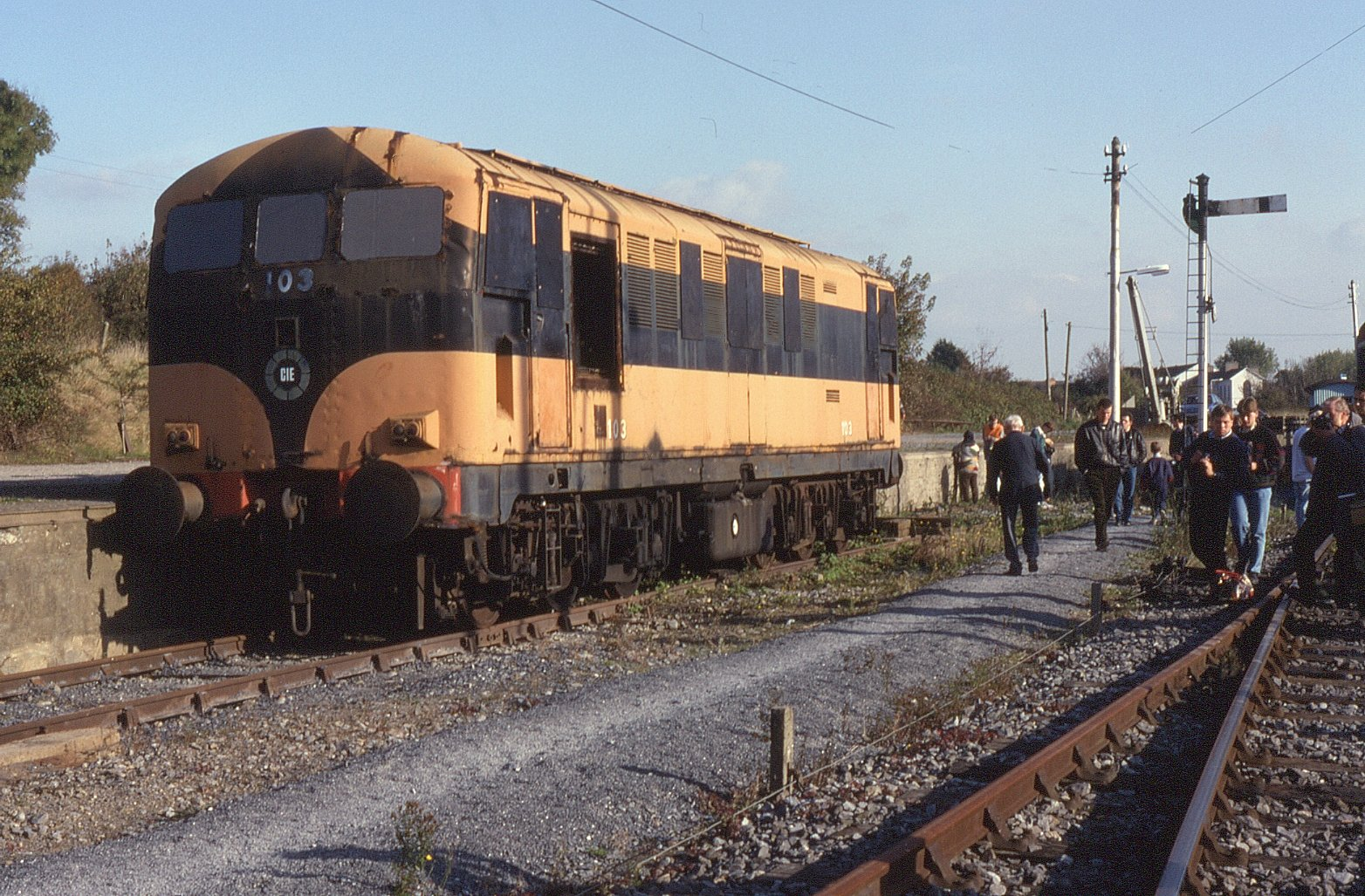
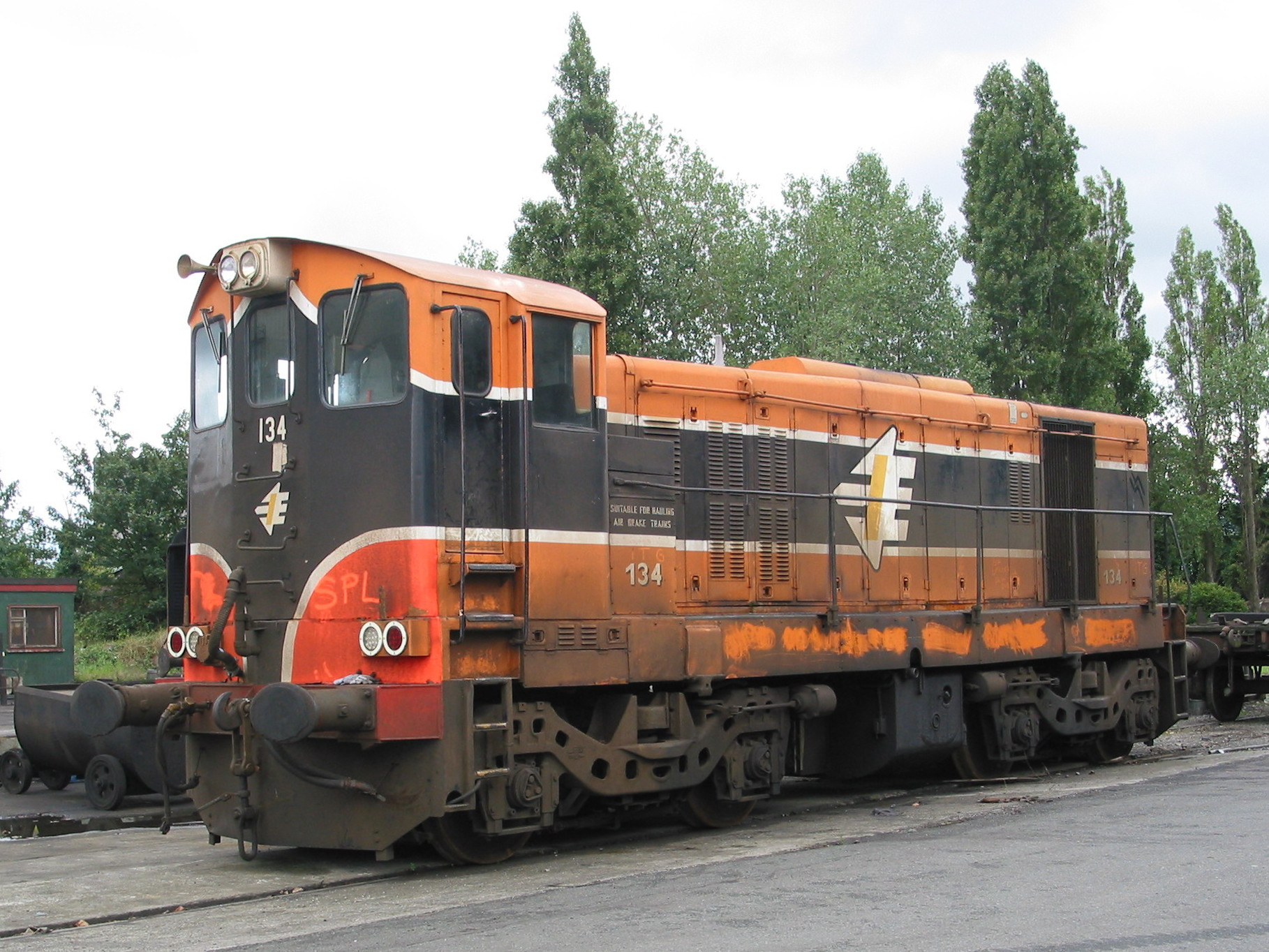
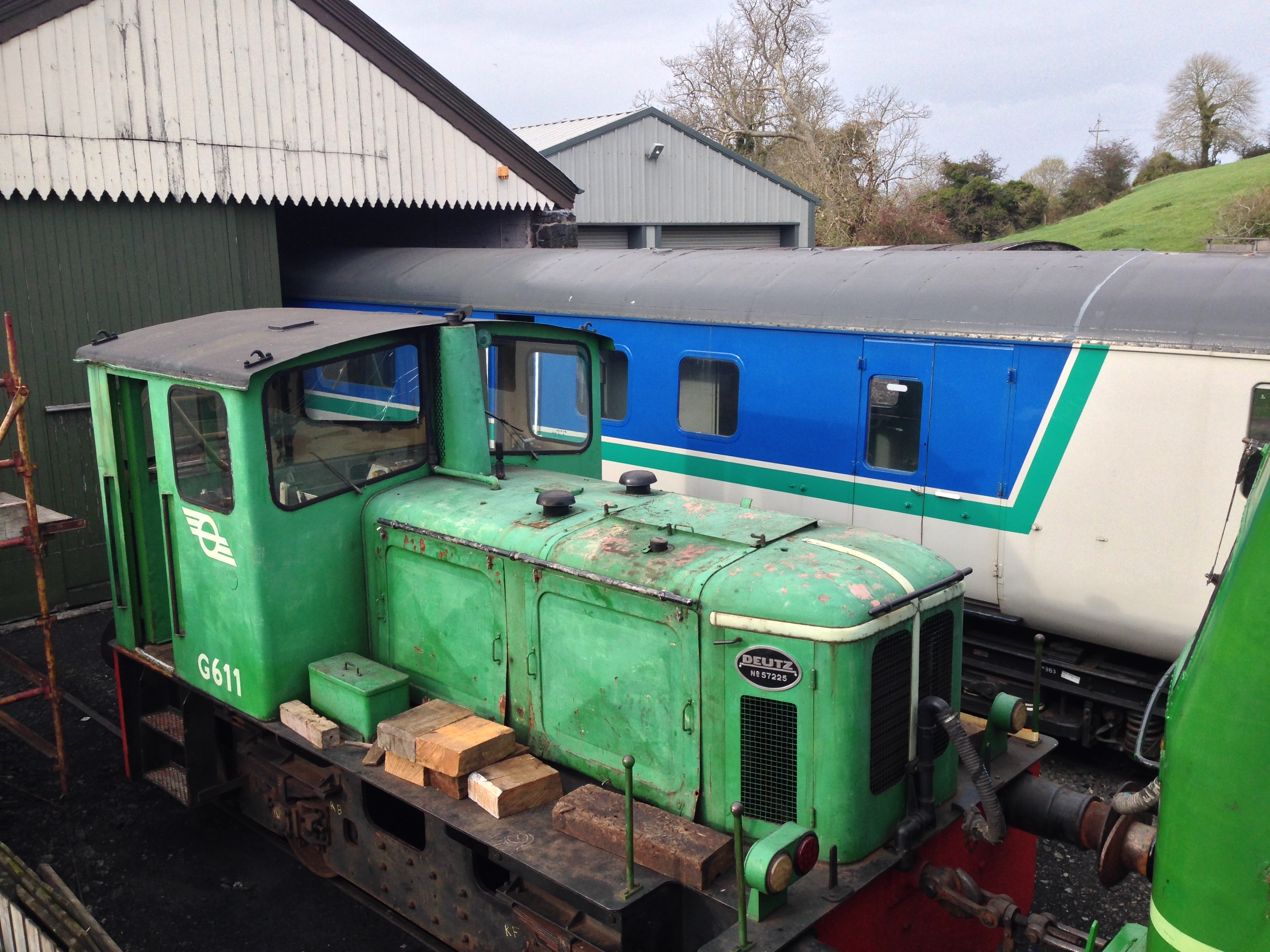
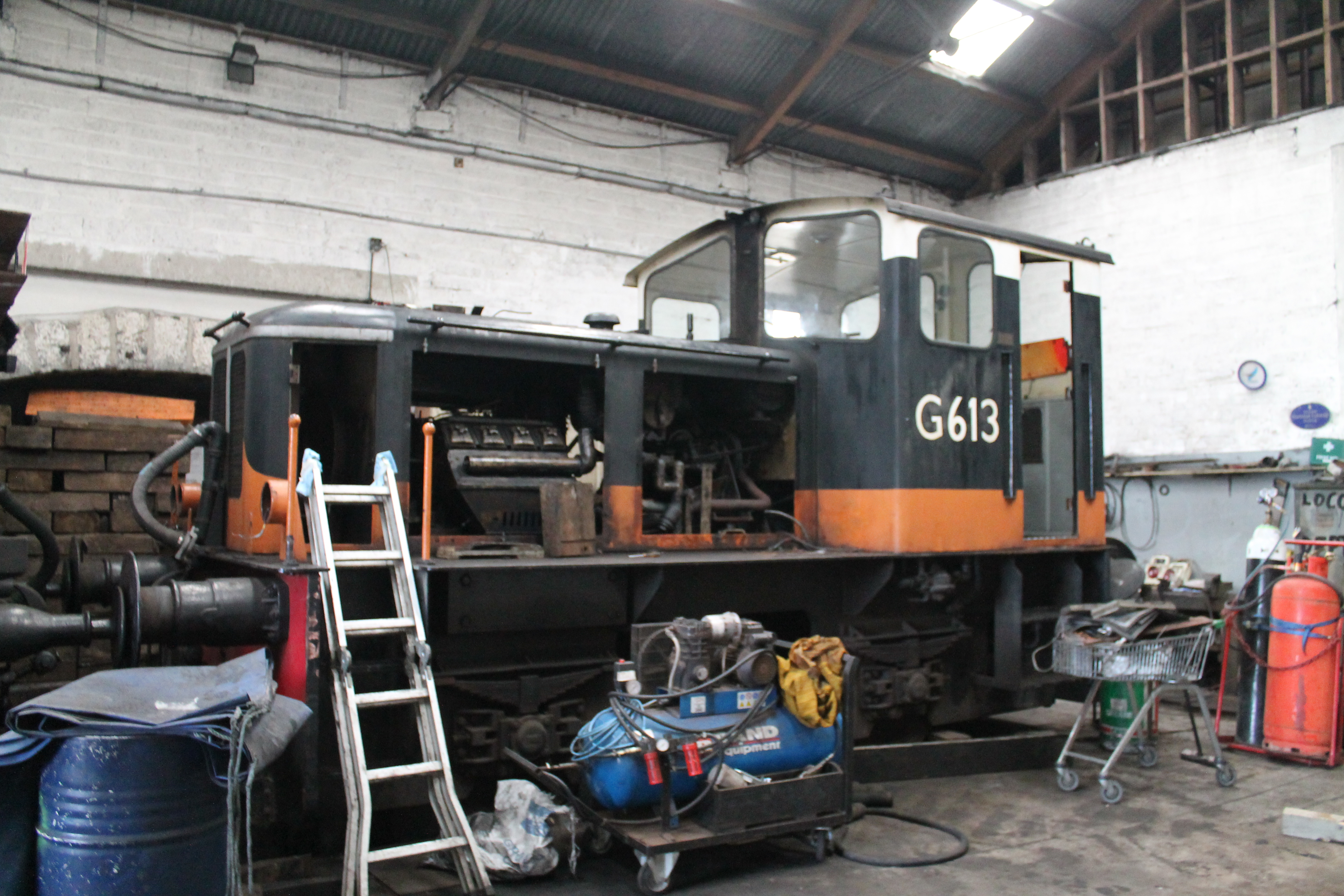
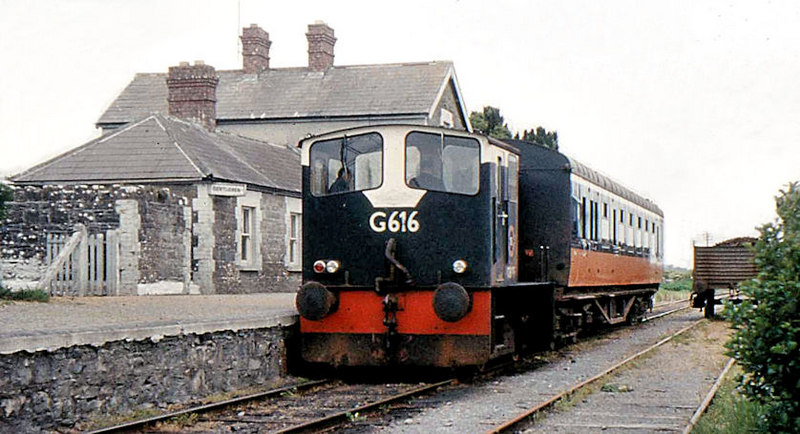
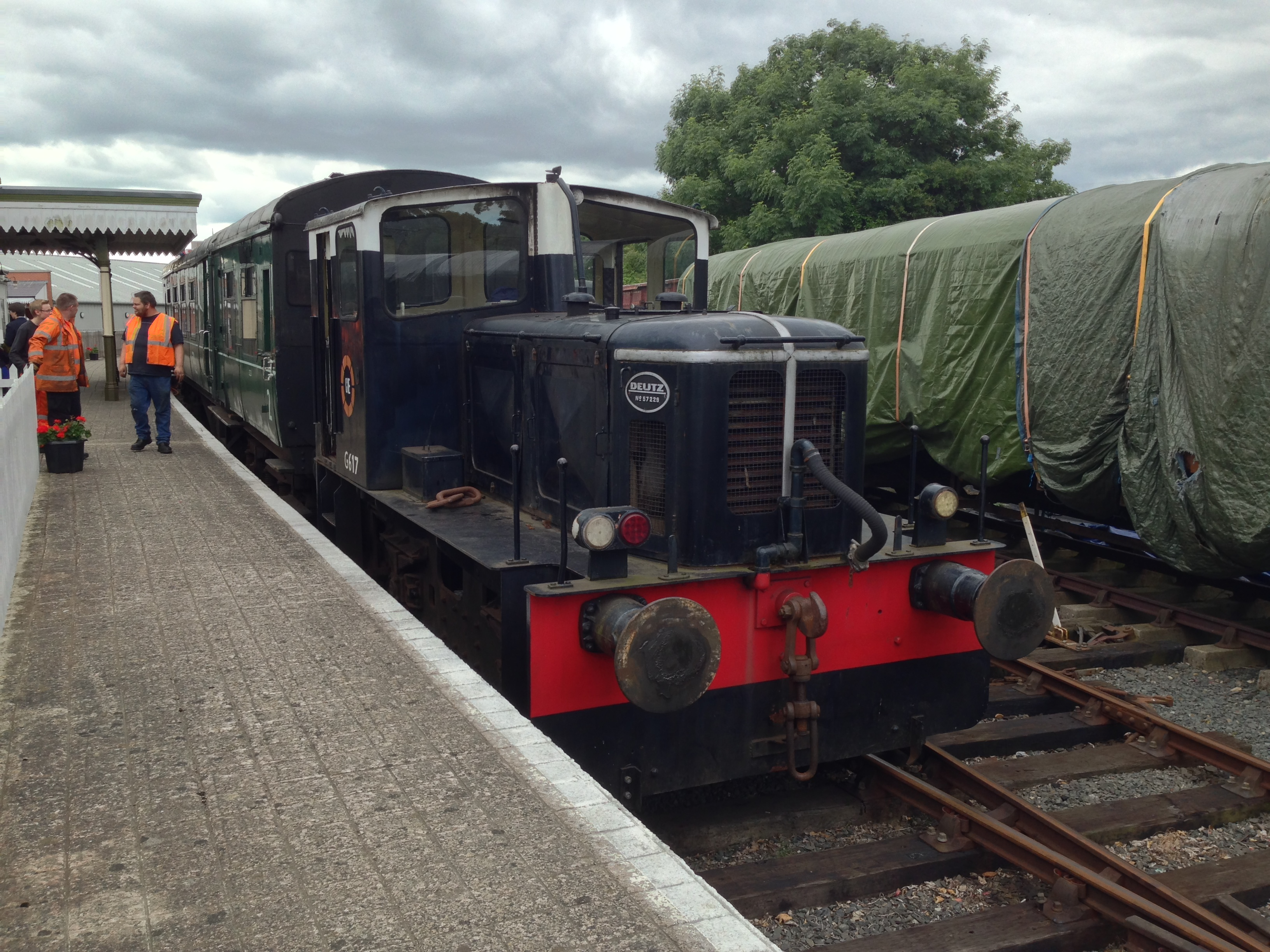
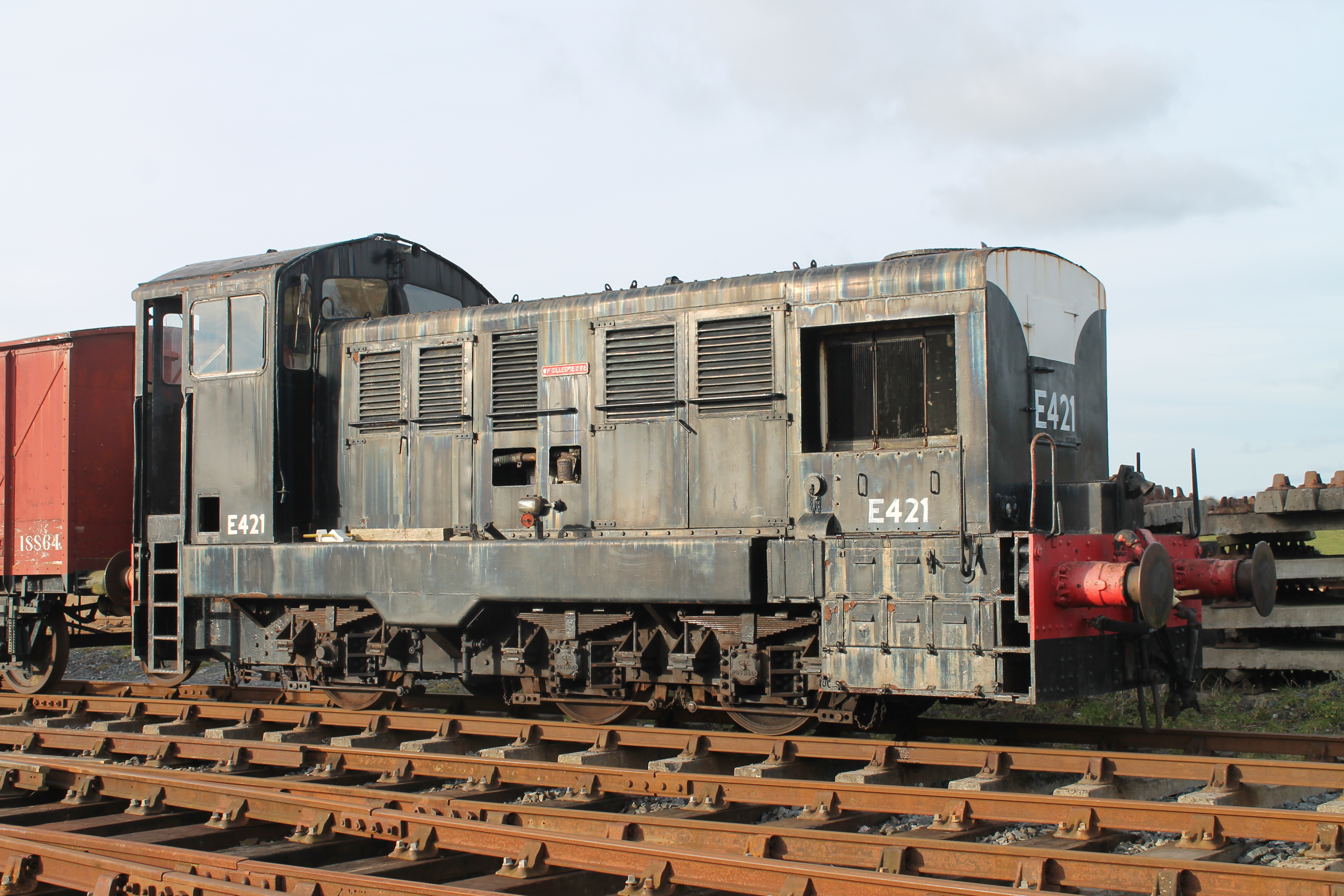
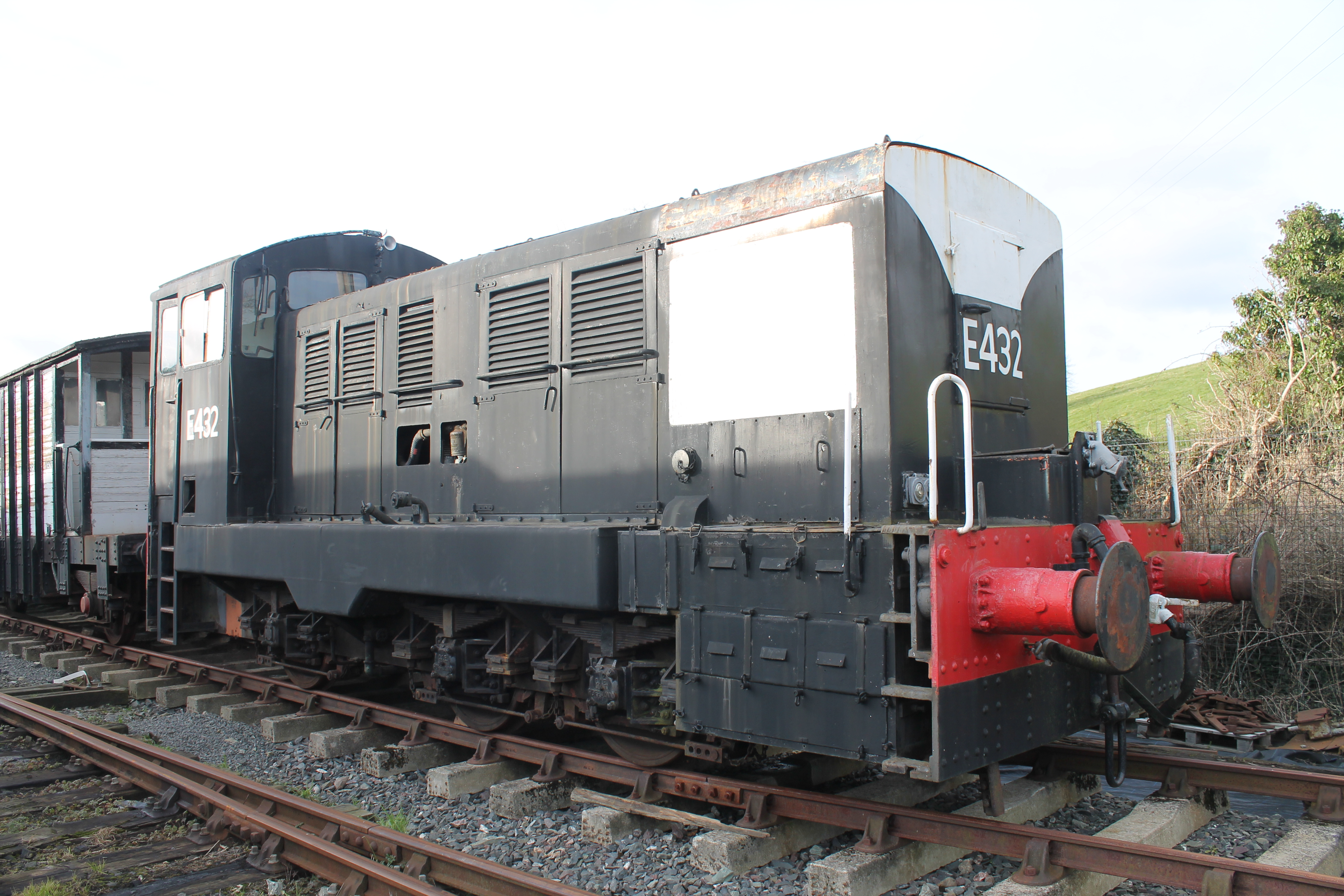
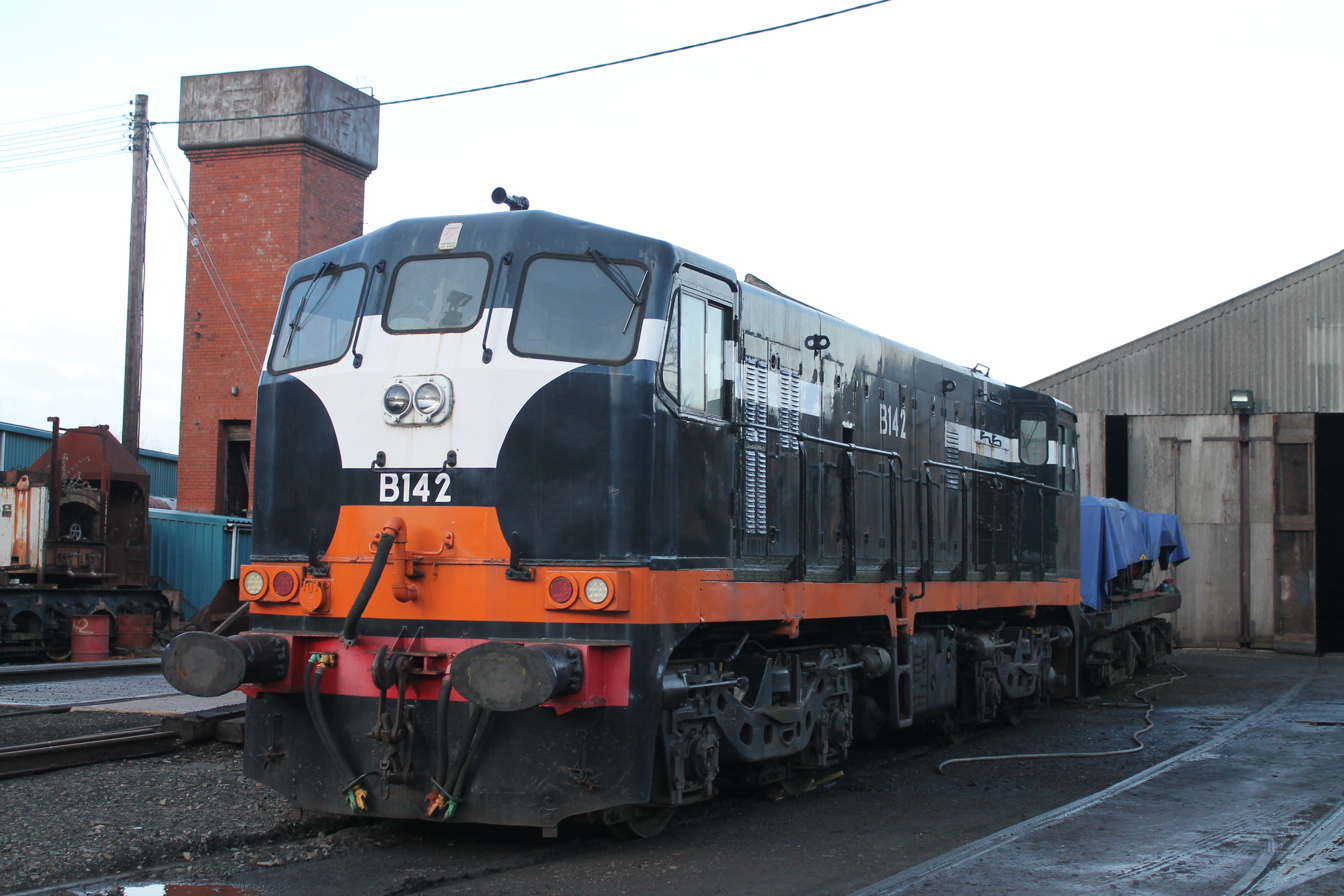
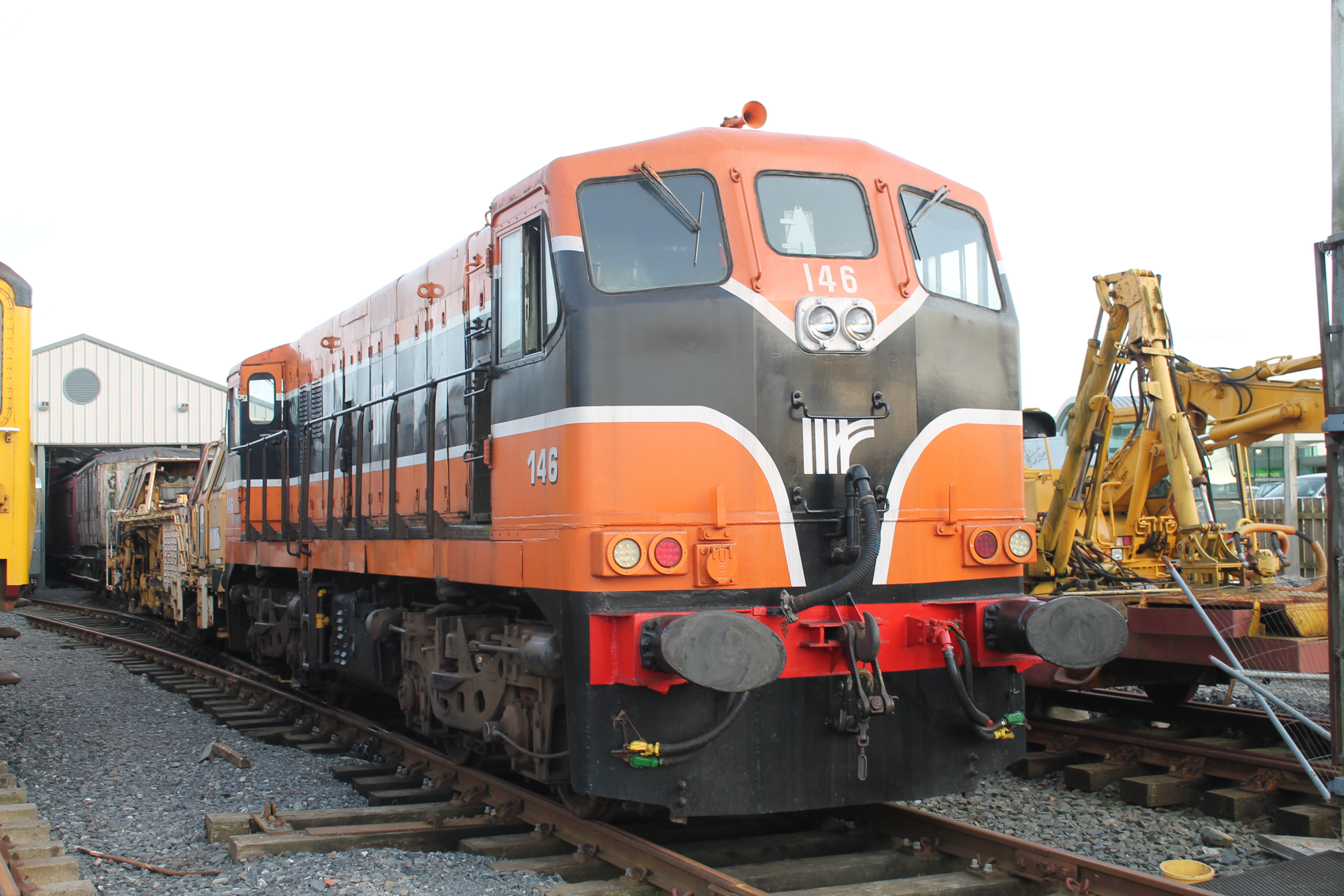
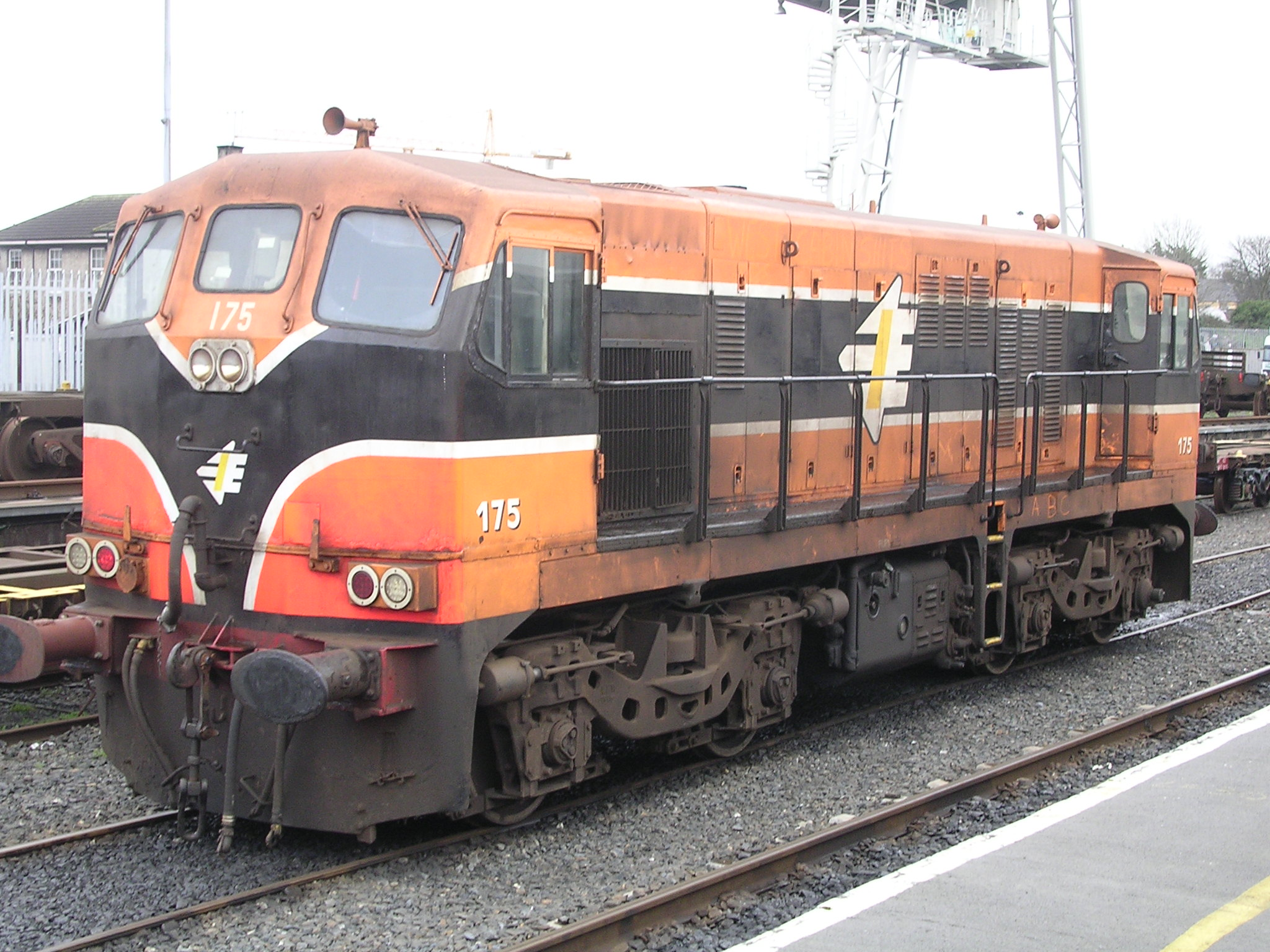
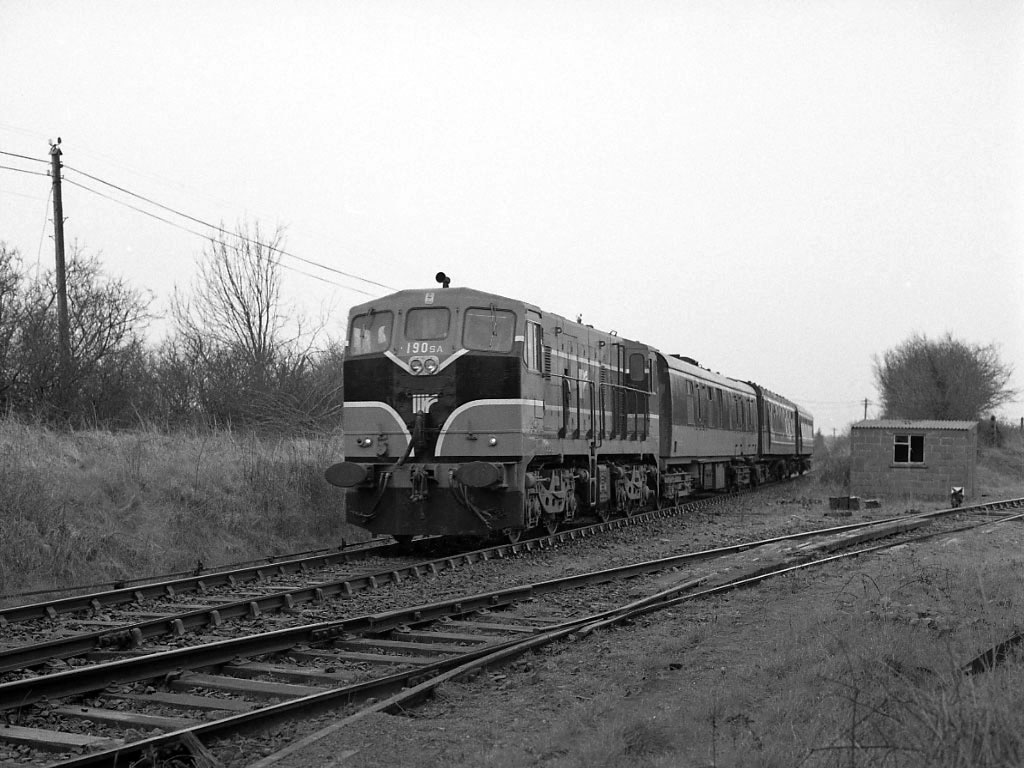
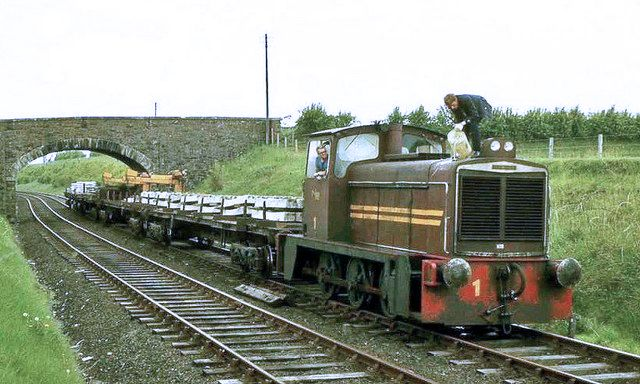
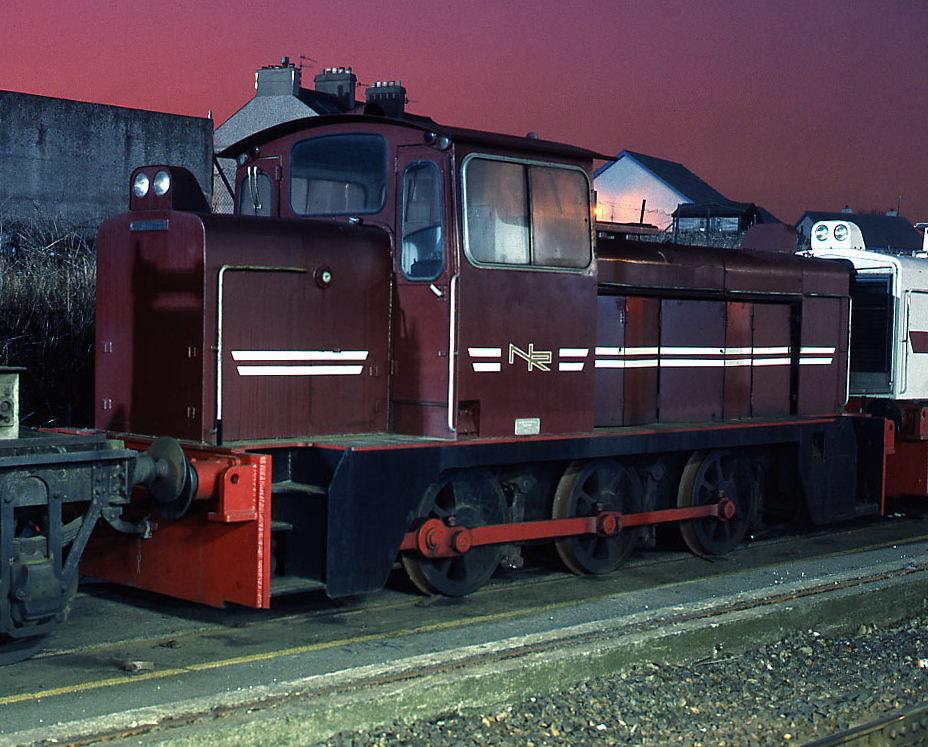
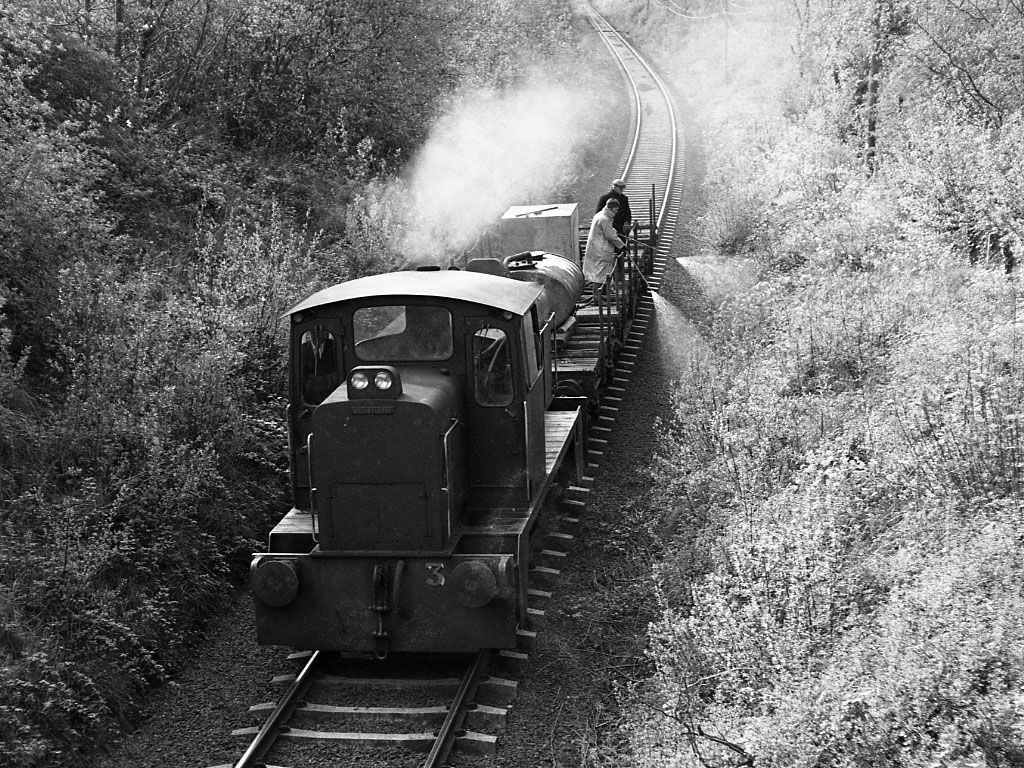
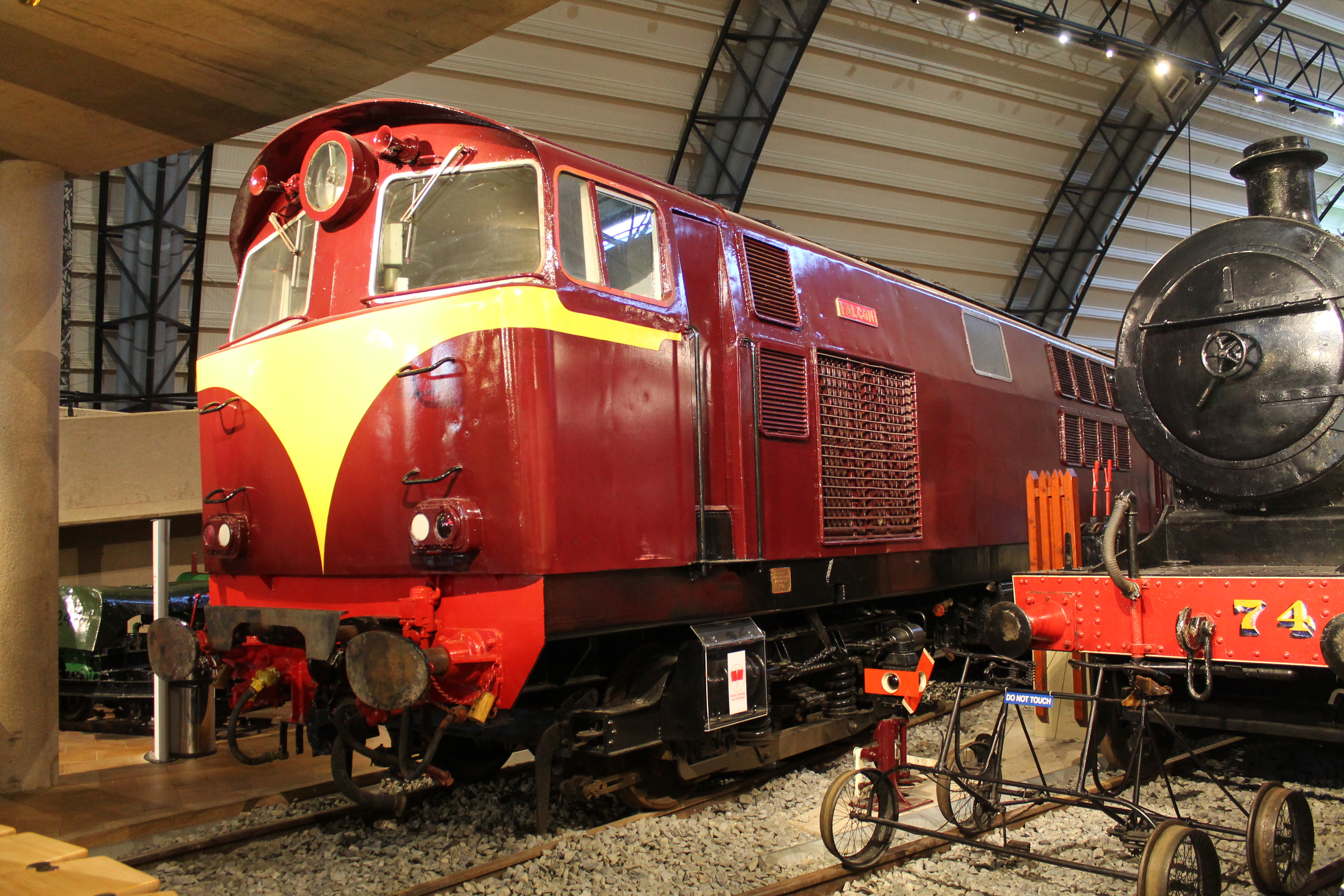
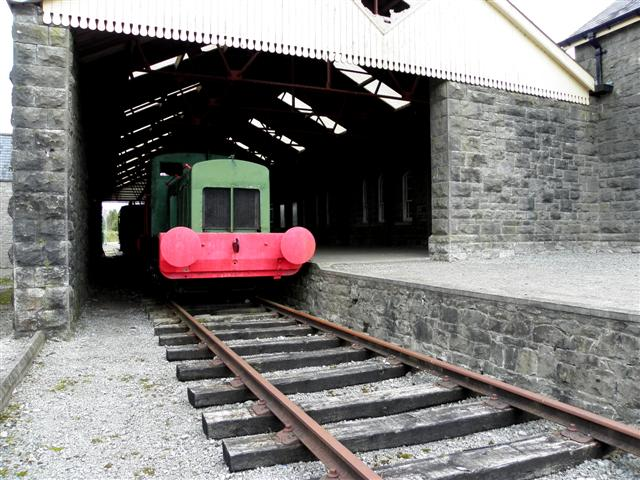
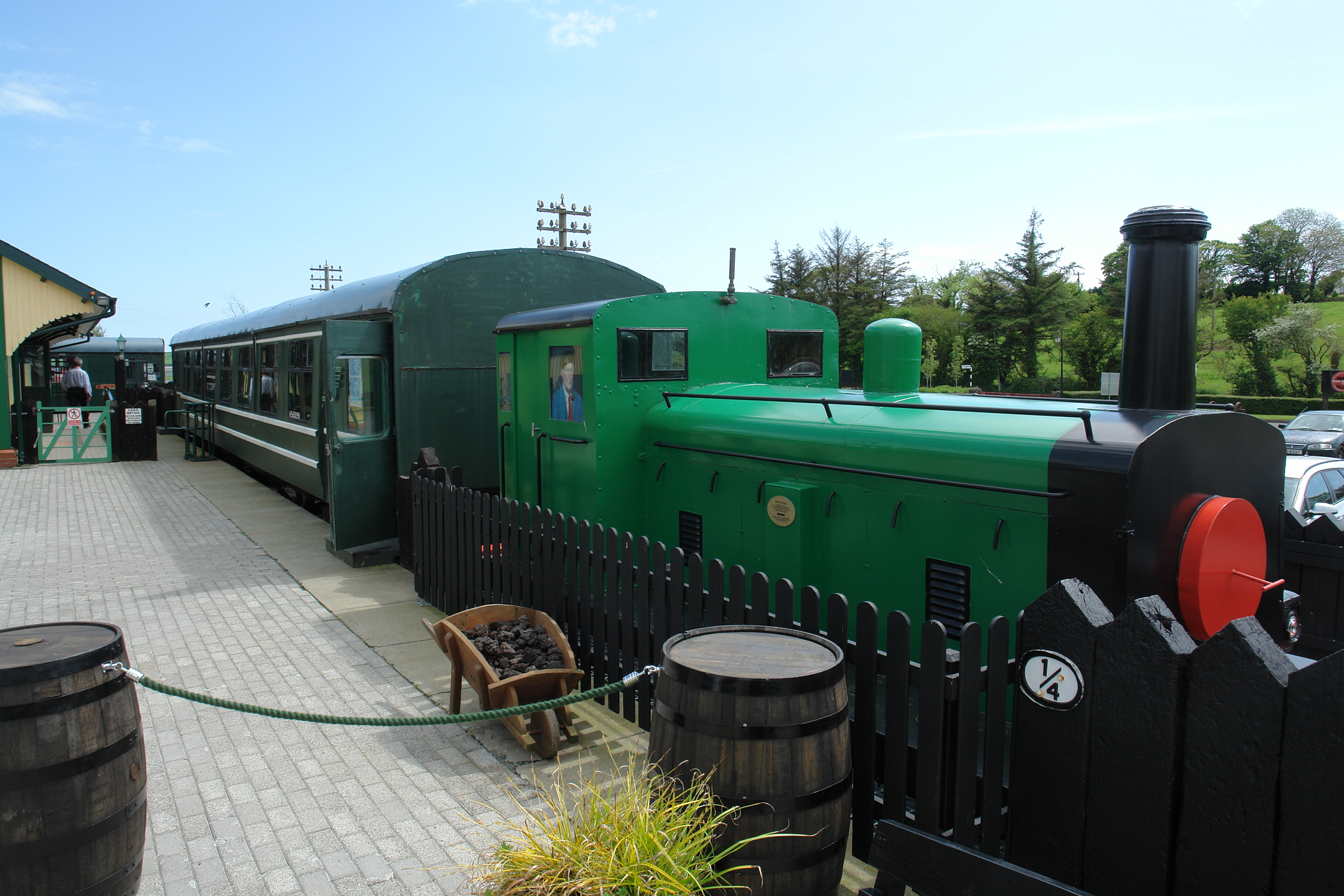
Image	Company	Number / Name	Class	Type	Manufacturer	Serial No.	Date	Notes
5 ft 3 in (1,600 mm)
	Córas Iompair Éireann	B113	113	Bo′Bo′	Inchicore Works, Inchicore, Dublin, Ireland	-	1950	Static display, Ulster Folk and Transport Museums, Cultra, Belfast
-	Córas Iompair Éireann	A3R	001	Co′Co′	Metropolitan-Vickers, Dukinfield Works, Manchester, England	889	1955	Downpatrick and County Down Railway (run by); Irish Traction Group (owned)
	Córas Iompair Éireann	A15	001	Co′Co′	Metropolitan-Vickers, Dukinfield Works, Manchester, England	901	1955	West Clare Railway
	Córas Iompair Éireann	A39R	001	Co′Co′	Metropolitan-Vickers, Dukinfield Works, Manchester, England	925	1955	Downpatrick and County Down Railway (run by); Irish Traction Group (owned)
	Córas Iompair Éireann	A55	001	Co′Co′	Metropolitan-Vickers, Dukinfield Works, Manchester, England	941	1955	Castlerea Railway Museum
-	Córas Iompair Éireann	226	201	Bo′Bo′	Metropolitan-Vickers, Dukinfield Works, Manchester, England	972	1956	Irish Traction Group
	Córas Iompair Éireann	231	201	Bo′Bo′	Metropolitan-Vickers, Dukinfield Works, Manchester, England	977	1956	Downpatrick and County Down Railway (run by); Irish Traction Group (owned)
	Córas Iompair Éireann	103	101	A1A-A1A	Birmingham Railway Carriage and Wagon Company, Birmingham, England	DEL22	1956	Irish Traction Group
-	Córas Iompair Éireann	G601	601	B	Motorenfabrick Deutz, Cologne, West Germany	56118	1956	Irish Traction Group
-	Córas Iompair Éireann	124	121	Bo′Bo′	General Motors Electro Motive Division, La Grange, Illinois, USA	26274	1960	Downpatrick and County Down Railway (run by); Irish Traction Group (owned)
-	Córas Iompair Éireann	133	121	Bo′Bo′	General Motors Electro Motive Division, La Grange, Illinois, USA	26283	1961	Cavan and Leitrim Railway (Cab Only)
	Córas Iompair Éireann	134	121	Bo′Bo′	General Motors Electro Motive Division, La Grange, Illinois, USA	26284	1961	Railway Preservation Society of Ireland
	Córas Iompair Éireann	G611	611	B	Motorenfabrick Deutz, Cologne, West Germany	57223	1961	Downpatrick and County Down Railway (run by); Irish Traction Group (owned)
	Córas Iompair Éireann	G613	611	B	Motorenfabrick Deutz, Cologne, West Germany	57225	1961	Downpatrick and County Down Railway (privately owned)
	Córas Iompair Éireann	G616	611	B	Motorenfabrick Deutz, Cologne, West Germany	57228	1962	Irish Traction Group
	Córas Iompair Éireann	G617	611	B	Motorenfabrick Deutz, Cologne, West Germany	57229	1962	Downpatrick and County Down Railway (run by); Irish Traction Group (owned)
	Córas Iompair Éireann	E421	421	C	Inchicore works, Inchicore, Dublin, Ireland	-	1962	Downpatrick and County Down Railway
-	Córas Iompair Éireann	E428	421	C	Inchicore works, Inchicore, Dublin, Ireland	-	1962	Dunsandle railway station
	Córas Iompair Éireann	E432	421	C	Inchicore works, Inchicore, Dublin, Ireland	-	1963	Downpatrick and County Down Railway
-	Córas Iompair Éireann	B141	141	Bo′Bo′	General Motors Electro Motive Division, La Grange, Illinois, USA	27467	1962	Railway Preservation Society of Ireland
	Córas Iompair Éireann	B142	141	Bo′Bo′	General Motors Electro Motive Division, La Grange, Illinois, USA	27468	1962	Railway Preservation Society of Ireland
	Córas Iompair Éireann	146	141	Bo′Bo′	General Motors Electro Motive Division, La Grange, Illinois, USA	27473	1962	Downpatrick and County Down Railway (run by); Irish Traction Group (owned)
-	Córas Iompair Éireann	147	141	Bo′Bo′	General Motors Electro Motive Division, La Grange, Illinois, USA	27474	1962	Railway Preservation Society of Ireland
-	Córas Iompair Éireann	152	141	Bo′Bo′	General Motors Electro Motive Division, La Grange, Illinois, USA	27479	1962	Downpatrick and County Down Railway (run by); Irish Traction Group (owned)
-	Córas Iompair Éireann	171	141	Bo′Bo′	General Motors Electro Motive Division, La Grange, Illinois, USA	27497	1962	Railway Preservation Society of Ireland
	Córas Iompair Éireann	175	141	Bo′Bo′	General Motors Electro Motive Division, La Grange, Illinois, USA	27501	1962	Railway Preservation Society of Ireland
-	Córas Iompair Éireann	177	141	Bo′Bo′	General Motors Electro Motive Division, La Grange, Illinois, USA	27503	1962	Railway Preservation Society of Ireland
	Córas Iompair Éireann	190	181	Bo′Bo′	General Motors Electro Motive Division, La Grange, Illinois, USA	31257	1966	Downpatrick and County Down Railway (run by); Irish Traction Group (owned)
	Northern Ireland Railways	1	1	0-6-0	English Electric at Vulcan Foundry, Newton-le-Willows, Merseyside, England	3954	1969	Wales
	Northern Ireland Railways	2	1	0-6-0	English Electric at Vulcan Foundry, Newton-le-Willows, Merseyside, England	3955	1969	Sri Lanka
	Northern Ireland Railways	3	1	0-6-0	English Electric at Vulcan Foundry, Newton-le-Willows, Merseyside, England	3956	1969	Sri Lanka
	Northern Ireland Railways	102 Falcon	101	Bo′Bo′	Hunslet Engine Company, Hunslet, Leeds, England	7198	1970	Static display, Ulster Folk and Transport Museums, Cultra, Belfast
-	Irish Shell	23	-	4wDM	F. C. Hibberd & Co., England	3509	1951	Railway Preservation Society of Ireland
-	CSE Carlow No.1	CSE Carlow No.1	-	4wDM	Ruston & Hornsby, Lincoln, England	382827	1955	Railway Preservation Society of Ireland
-	Ulster Transport Authority	2	-	4wDM	Unilokomotive Ltd., Ireland	A/17885	1965	Railway Preservation Society of Ireland
	Mallow Sugar Factory	2	-	4wDM	Ruston & Hornsby, Lincoln, England	312425	1951	Belturbet Railway Station
-	Mallow Sugar Factory	4	-	4wDM	Ruston & Hornsby, Lincoln, England	252843	1948	Connemara Railway
	Mallow Sugar Factory	90	-	4wDM	Ruston & Hornsby, Lincoln, England	305322	1951	West Cork Model Railway Village

== See also ==
- Coaching stock of Ireland
- Rail freight stock of Ireland
- Multiple units of Ireland
- Rail transport in Ireland
- Steam locomotives of Ireland
- History of rail transport in Ireland
