= G class =

G class or Class G may refer to:

== Railways ==
- Commonwealth Railways G class, a class of 4-6-0 steam locomotive used in Australia
- MRWA G class, a class of diesel locomotive used in Australia
- NBR G Class, a class of steam locomotive used in the United Kingdom
- NZR G class (1874), a type of steam locomotive used in New Zealand
- NZR G class (1928), a type of steam locomotive used in New Zealand
- Tasmanian Government Railways G class, a class of 0-4-2T steam locomotive used in Australia
- Victorian Railways G class, a class of 2-6-0+0-6-2 steam locomotives
- Victorian Railways G class (1877), a class of 4-4-0 steam locomotives
- V/Line G class, a class of diesel-electric locomotives
- SECR G class, a class of 4-4-0 steam locomotives
- Two types of diesel locomotives used by Córas Iompair Éireann:
  - CIÉ 601 Class
  - CIÉ 611 Class
- Australian Standard Garratt
- Metropolitan Railway G Class, a class of 0-6-4T steam locomotives
- South Australian Railways G class, a class of 2-4-0 steam locomotives
- Victorian Railways G class, a class of narrow gauge locomotives
- G class Melbourne tram
- G-class Sydney tram
- WAGR G class, a class of 2-6-0 steam locomotives operated by the Western Australian Government Railways

== Ships ==
- G-class destroyer (disambiguation), several classes of ships
- G-class frigate, one of the frigate classes of the Turkish Navy
- G-class landing craft, a vessel in use by the Finnish Navy and the Swedish Navy
- G-class submarine (disambiguation), several classes of ships
- OOCL G-class container ship, a class of very large container ships.

== Other uses ==
- Class G, a class of airspace in various airspace classification systems
- G-class blimp, a type of blimp built in America from 1935
- Class G, a spectral class for stars
- Class G amplifier, a class of electronic amplifiers usually used in high-power audio applications
- Mercedes-Benz G-Class, a luxury SUV (sport utility vehicle)
- Short G-class, a transport flying-boat
- Google Classroom
