= 421 class =

421 class or Class 421 may refer to:

- British Rail Class 421
- CIE 421 Class
- New South Wales 421 class locomotive
