= CIÉ 301 Class =

D301 Class (generally simply known as "D" class)
Type and origin
- Power type: Diesel–electric
- Builder: CIÉ Inchicore Works
- Build date: 1947–1948
- Total produced: 5
Specifications
- Configuration
  - Whyte: 0-6-0DE
  - UIC: C
- Gauge: 5 ft 3 in (1,600 mm)
- Wheel diameter: 4 ft 0 in (1.219 m)
- Length: 8.84 m (29 ft 0 in)
- Loco weight: 53.8 tonnes (53.0 long tons; 59.3 short tons)
- Prime mover: Mirrlees TLDT6 diesel
- Traction motors: Brush Traction, 2 off
Performance figures
- Maximum speed: 25 mph (40 km/h)
- Power output: 487 hp (363 kW)
- Tractive effort: Starting: 107 kN (24,000 lbf)
Career
- Operators: Córas Iompair Éireann
- Class: J1A; later D
- Numbers: Originally 1000-1004, renumbered D301-D305
- Withdrawn: 1960–1976
- Disposition: All scrapped 1977

The Córas Iompair Éireann 301 Class locomotives were the first diesel locomotives used on the CIÉ network, this class of 5 being built between 1947 and 1948 by the company for shunting use, particularly in the railway yards on Dublin's North Wall. They were a six coupled (0-6-0 wheel arrangement) locomotive, fitted with a Mirrlees TLDT6 engine of 487 horsepower (363 kW) with diesel–electric transmission via two Brush traction motors. Unusually, they lacked train vacuum brakes, although air brakes were provided for the locomotive itself.

They were initially numbered 1000-1004 in the steam locomotive number series, but were subsequently renumbered D301-D305 in order. The locomotives were used on yard pilot and transfer freight duties, although number 1000 hauled a freight train from Dublin to Cork during trials. Two locomotives were stored from 1960 and the rest had followed by 1972, though officially they remained in stock until 1976. All five were scrapped in 1977.

== Model ==
The D Class is not available in either RTR or kit form. However, the British Rail Class 08 can be used as a close approximation.
