= LMS diesel shunter 7057 =

Type and origin
- Power type: Diesel-mechanical
- Builder: Harland & Wolff
- Build date: 1934
- Total produced: 1
Specifications
- Configuration
  - Whyte: 0-6-0DM
  - UIC: C
- Gauge: 4 ft 8 1/2 in (1,435 mm) standard gauge, later 5 ft 3 in (1,600 mm)
- Wheel diameter: 3 ft 2 in (0.965 m)
- Wheelbase: 12 ft 0 in (3.66 m)
- Length: 25 ft 4.25 in (7.73 m)
- Width: 8 ft 6 in (2.59 m)
- Height: 12 ft 0 in (3.66 m)
- Loco weight: 27.5 long tons (27.9 t)
- Fuel capacity: 105 imp gal (480 L; 126 US gal)
- Prime mover: Harland & Wolff-Burmeister & Wain "Harlandic" TR4 3-cyl
- Transmission: Bostock & Bramley
- Train heating: None
- Loco brake: Air
- Train brakes: None
Performance figures
- Maximum speed: 10 mph (16 km/h)
- Power output: 175 hp (130 kW) at 1100 rpm
- Tractive effort: Max: 17,500 lbf (77.8 kN)
Career
- Operators: London, Midland and Scottish Railway; War Department; Northern Counties Committee
- Numbers: LMS: 7057; WD: 233; NCC: 22
- Withdrawn: 1965
- Disposition: Scrapped

LMS diesel shunter 7057, later to become NCC Class 22, was built by Harland & Wolff. Testing started in July 1934 and the locomotive was taken into LMS stock in February 1935. It was loaned to the War Department between 1941-1943, which numbered it 233. It was withdrawn from LMS stock in January 1944 and sold back to Harland & Wolff, which rebuilt it with a new 225 hp (168 kW) engine and converted it to the 5 ft 3 in (1,600 mm) gauge. It was then sold to the Northern Counties Committee, which numbered it 22. It was finally withdrawn in April 1965 and scrapped at the close of that year.

== See also ==
- LMS diesel shunters
- Diesel locomotives of Ireland
