= CIÉ 113 Class =

Córas Iompair Éireann B class (later 113 class)
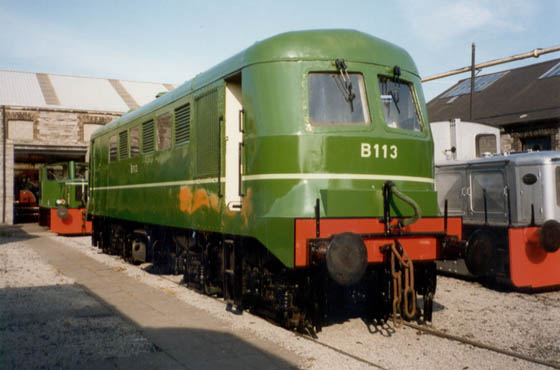
- B Class locomotive No.113
Type and origin
- Power type: Diesel–electric
- Builder: Córas Iompair Éireann, Inchicore works
- Build date: 1950–1951
- Total produced: 2
Specifications
- Configuration
  - AAR: B-B
  - UIC: Bo′Bo′
- Gauge: 1,600 mm (5 ft 3 in)
- Wheel diameter: 44 in (1,118 mm)
- Length: 14.53 m (47 ft 8 in)
- Loco weight: 81 t (80 long tons; 89 short tons)
- Fuel capacity: 1,910 litres (420 imp gal; 500 US gal)
- Prime mover: Sulzer 6LDA28
- Engine type: Four-stroke diesel
- Generator: DC
- Traction motors: DC Metrovick MV137, 4 off
- Transmission: Diesel electric
- Loco brake: Westinghouse air brake
- Train brakes: Vacuum
Performance figures
- Maximum speed: 88 km/h (55 mph)
- Power output: 915 hp (682 kW) at 750rpm (one hour); 815 hp (608 kW) at 700 rpm (continuous); Uprated in 1956 to 960 hp (720 kW)
- Tractive effort: 205 kN (46,000 lbf) (starting); 102 kN (23,000 lbf) at 15.3 km/h (9.5 mph)
Career
- Operators: Córas Iompair Éireann
- Class: C2a, later B, later 113
- Numbers: 1100–1101, later B113–B114
- Withdrawn: 1971
- Disposition: One preserved, Ulster Folk and Transport Museum, other scrapped

The Córas Iompair Éireann 113 class locomotives were the first mainline diesel locomotives used in Ireland, being built in January 1950 and October 1951 by CIÉ at their Inchicore Works. They were fitted with Sulzer 6LDA28 engines of 915 hp (682 kW) (uprated to 960 hp or 720 kW in 1956), with four Metropolitan-Vickers MV157 traction motors. They were of Bo-Bo wheel arrangement, weighed 80 tonnes and had a maximum speed of 90 km/h (56 mph). They were initially numbered 1100–1101 in the steam locomotive number series (and designated class C2a), but were subsequently renumbered B113–B114 in 1957.

== History ==
They were intended for mixed traffic duties, hauling both freight and passenger trains. When they were first introduced, they were used on some of the express passenger duties between Dublin and Cork. However, with the arrival of production diesel locomotives (the 001 and 101 Classes) from 1955, these two locomotives were used more for freight work, mostly in the area around Dublin.

They suffered from a recurring brake fault and following a serious incident in August 1971 when 114 ran away while working a goods train, both locomotives were withdrawn for modifications to be made to their brakes. In fact, 114 was never reinstated and 113 only worked for a few months at the end of 1974 before it too was stored again. Both were then used at Inchicore Works as part of a sound barrier with 101 Class locomotives. B113 was presented to the Ulster Folk and Transport Museum in May 2011, but 114 was scrapped in March 1995.

== Preservation ==
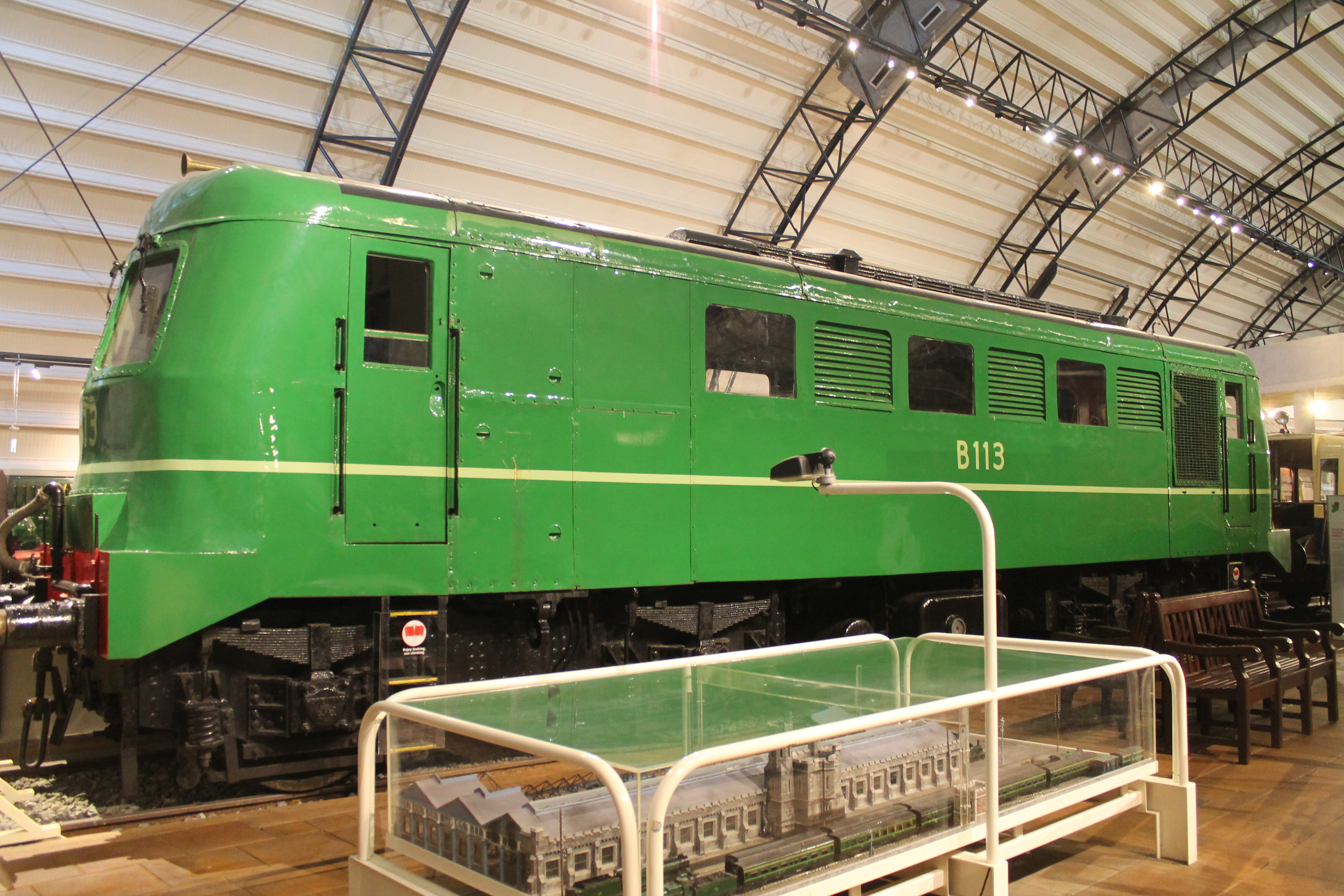
B113 On display at the UFTM

B113 was preserved by Iarnród Éireann at Inchicore works, Dublin, and received a cosmetic restoration there. It was then transferred to the RPSI's depot in Whitehead, County Antrim and later taken to the Ulster Folk and Transport Museum for static display in January 2012, along with NIR 101 Class No. 102. The two locos are currently incapable of running under their own power, and so NIR 111 class locomotives 112 and 113 provided motive power for the move.
