= BCDR 28 =

Class 28
Type and origin
- Power type: Diesel-electric
- Builder: Harland & Wolff
- Build date: 1937
- Total produced: 1
Specifications
- Configuration
  - Commonwealth: 1A+A1
- Gauge: 5 ft 3 in (1,600 mm)
- Loco weight: 48.0 tonnes (47.2 long tons; 52.9 short tons)
- Prime mover: H&W Harlandic
Performance figures
- Maximum speed: 60 mph (97 km/h)
- Power output: 500 hp (370 kW)
- Tractive effort: 10,000 lbf (44 kN)
Career
- Operators: BCDR; NCC; GNRB; UTA; NIR
- Number in class: 1
- Numbers: 28
- Last run: 1970
- Scrapped: 1973
- Disposition: Scrapped

The Belfast and County Down Railway (BCDR) Class 28 locomotive was speculatively built by Harland & Wolff in 1937. It remained operational until withdrawn and scrapped in 1973, retaining its number 28 having six owners in its lifetime.
