= CIÉ 101 Class =

Córas Iompair Éireann B class (later 101 class)
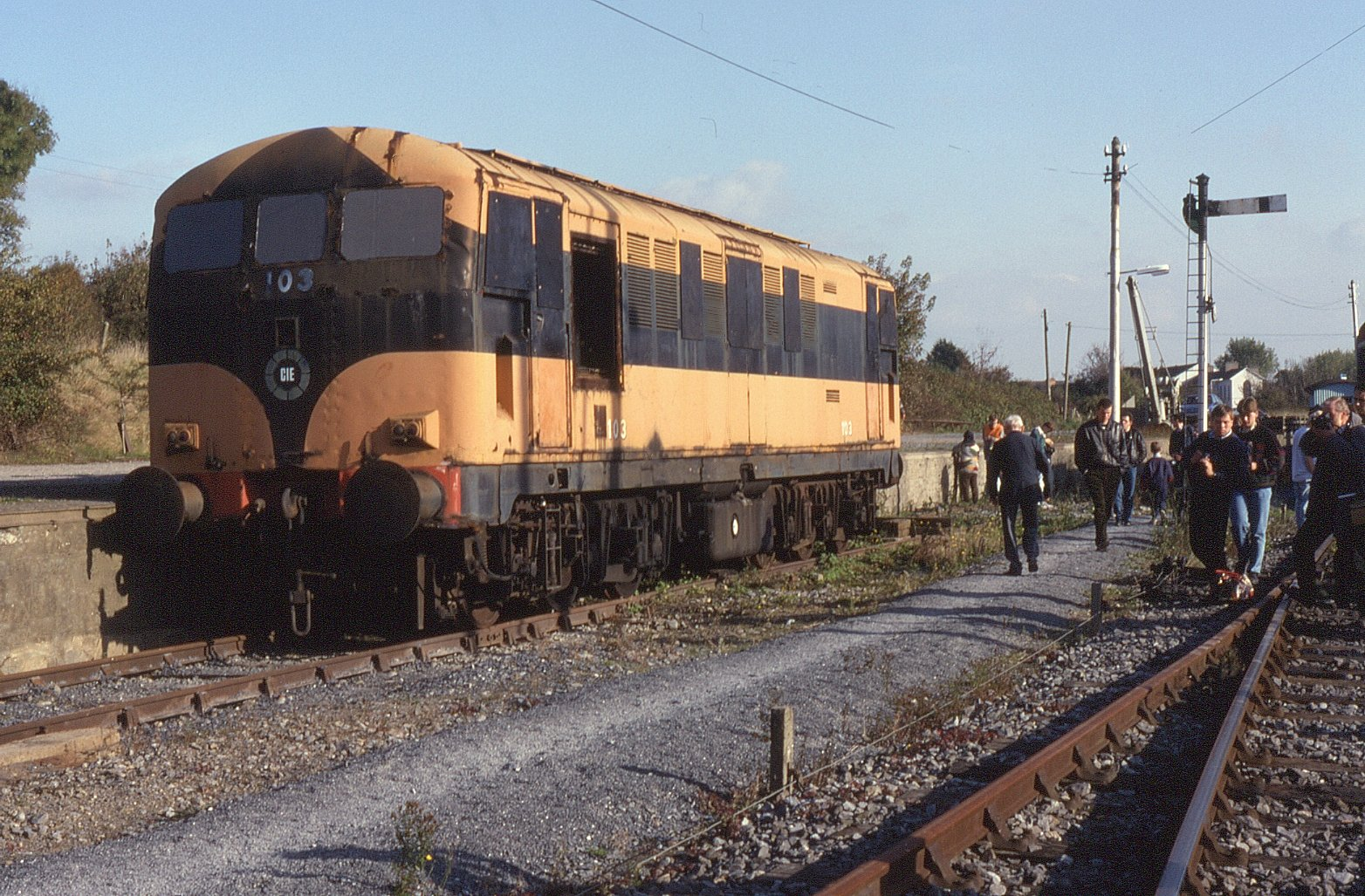
- B class locomotive No. 103
Type and origin
- Power type: Diesel–electric
- Builder: Birmingham Railway Carriage and Wagon Company
- Serial number: DEL20–DEL31
- Build date: 1956–1957
- Total produced: 12
Specifications
- Configuration
  - AAR: A1A-A1A
  - UIC: (A1A)(A1A)
- Gauge: 1,600 mm (5 ft 3 in)
- Bogies: Modified Pennsylvania Railroad swing bolster bogies
- Wheel diameter: 952 mm (37.5 in)
- Length: 14.50 m (47 ft 7 in)
- Height: 3.93 m (12 ft 11 in)
- Loco weight: 76.6 tonnes (75.4 long tons; 84.4 short tons)
- Fuel capacity: 3,406 litres (749 imp gal; 900 US gal)
- Prime mover: Sulzer 6LDA28
- Engine type: Straight 6
- Aspiration: Turbocharged
- Generator: DC
- Traction motors: Metropolitan Vickers MV137, 4 off
- Cylinders: 6
- Transmission: diesel electric
- Loco brake: Westinghouse straight air
- Train brakes: Vacuum
Performance figures
- Maximum speed: 120 km/h (75 mph)
- Power output: 960 hp (720 kW) at 710 rpm
- Tractive effort: 186 kN (42,000 lbf) (starting); 76 kN (17,000 lbf) at 26 km/h (16 mph) (continuous); This allowed a 300-tonne (300-long-ton; 330-short-ton) train to be hauled without banking assistance on the 1:60 (1.67%) gradient outside Cork
Career
- Operators: Córas Iompair Éireann
- Class: B, later 101
- Numbers: B101–B112
- Withdrawn: 1969–1978
- Disposition: One preserved, remainder scrapped

The Córas Iompair Éireann 101 Class locomotives, numbered B101-B112, were built in 1956 by the Birmingham Railway Carriage and Wagon Company. They were fitted with Sulzer 6LDA28 engines of 960 hp (720 kW), with four Metropolitan-Vickers MV137 traction motors. They were of A1A-A1A wheel arrangement, weighed 75 tonnes and had a maximum speed of 120 km/h (75 mph).

== History ==
With their design, size and axle loading, they were intended for mixed traffic duties, hauling both freight and passenger trains. They found regular use primarily on the Waterford-Mallow-Tralee line and also on the Tralee-Newcastle West-Limerick line. Given that they were the first main group of diesel locos used in Ireland, they proved very successful and quickly gained a reputation for comfort and reliability by contrast to the poor cab conditions and suspension rocking of the 113 Class and the interminable breakdowns of the A Class and C Class locomotives. However, during the 1960s many of the secondary lines that they were used on were closed and following the arrival of the 181 Class, the 101s were relegated to goods, permanent way and pilot duties.

The first withdrawal took place in 1969 (B111), and the last in February 1978 (B106). A proposal to re-engine them in the light of similar refurbishments of the Class 001 and Class 201 came to nothing, and the decision was taken to order new locomotives in the form of the 071 Class instead.

After withdrawal, the entire class was lined up together with the two 113 Class locomotives to form a sound barrier around Inchicore Works. Official withdrawal of the class came in April 1984, and the majority were scrapped between December 1986 and March 1987.

== Preservation ==
One locomotive, No. 103 survived and has been preserved by the Irish Traction Group, and is currently in storage at Carrick-on-Suir railway station. It was purchased by the group in 1993 directly from Iarnród Éireann and is awaiting eventual restoration.

== Model ==
A resin OO gauge model kit is available from Studio Scale Models, with etched brass/whitemetal detailing and a selection of decals to cover various liveries.

== See also ==
- British Rail Class 24 (fitted with the same engine)
