= G-class submarine =

G-class submarine may refer to:

- British G-class submarine
- Spanish G-class submarine, locally produced German Type VIIC-class submarines, see Spanish submarine G-7
- United States G-class submarine
