= CIÉ 611 Class =

G611 class
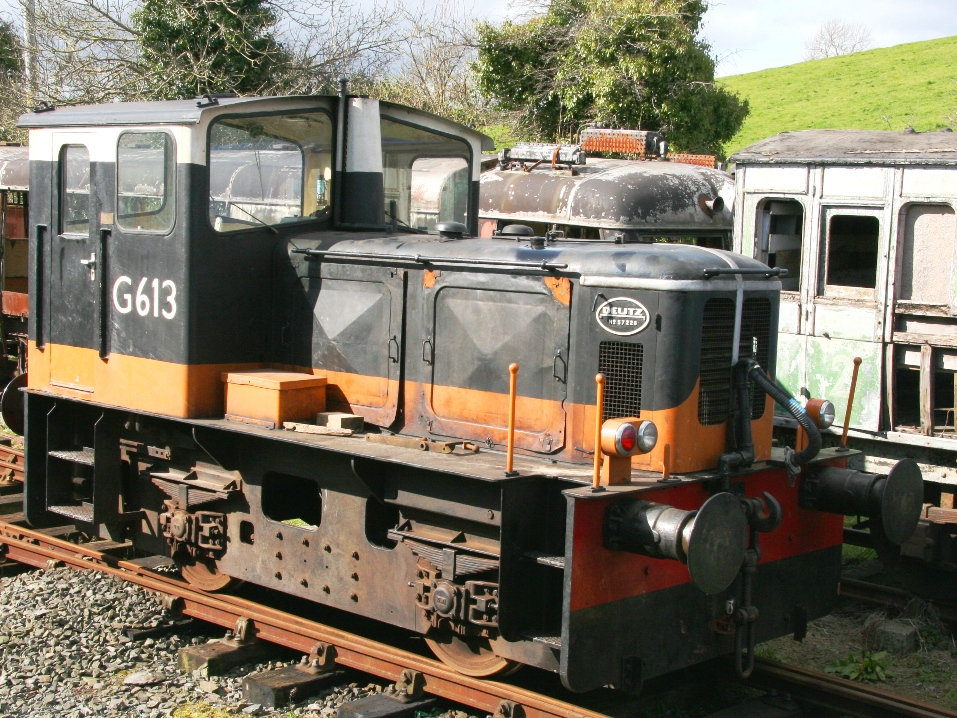
- CIÉ G611 class No. G613 at work on the Downpatrick & Co Down Railway, which also hosts G611 and G617.
Type and origin
- Power type: Diesel Hydraulic
- Builder: Motorenfabrick Deutz, Cologne, West Germany
- Serial number: 57223–57229 (not in order)
- Build date: 1961–1962
Specifications
- Configuration
  - UIC: B
- Gauge: 1,600 mm (5 ft 3 in)
- Driver dia.: 3 ft 1 1/2 in (0.95 m)
- Length: 6.43 m (21 ft 1 in)
- Loco weight: 22 t (22 long tons; 24 short tons)
- Prime mover: Deutz A8L 714 air-cooled diesel
- Engine type: V8
- Cylinders: 8
- Transmission: Voith hydraulic, chain drive final
Performance figures
- Maximum speed: 42 km/h (26 mph)
- Power output: 120 kW (160 hp)
- Tractive effort: 12,000 lbf (53.38 kN)
Career
- Operators: CIÉ (1962-77), Irish Sugar Co. (1977)
- Number in class: 7
- Numbers: G611–G617
- First run: 1962
- Withdrawn: 1967–1977
- Disposition: Four preserved, remainder scrapped

The Córas Iompair Éireann 611 class locomotives were delivered from the manufacturers, Motorenfabrik Deutz at Cologne, Germany. They were delivered between December 1961 and February 1962, entering revenue earning service in the following August after receiving the new tan / black paint job at Inchicore.

== History ==
Nos. 611 to 617 were a larger development of the earlier 601 class locomotives. They were fitted with a Deutz F/A8L 714 engine of 120 kilowatts (160 hp), with Voith hydraulic transmission, weighed 22 tonnes (22 long tons; 24 short tons) and had a maximum speed of 42 kilometres per hour (26 mph). They went into traffic in various parts of the country, as shunting engines at smaller depots such as Dublin's North City Mills siding and branch line duties such as the Loughrea branch line between Attymon and Loughrea. They briefly appeared on the Limerick - Foynes mixed train service for a few months until that line was closed in 1963. Unlike the earlier 601 class, these locomotives were fitted with brake connections enabling them to work passenger trains. Apart from their use on the Foynes and Loughrea lines, they never hauled passengers until preservation in Downpatrick, where all three preserved have served on public passenger trains.

With their original lightweight branch line haunts all closed and therefore little to do, they were withdrawn from service between 1967 and 1977. Nos. 611, 613, 615, 616 and 617 were sold to Cómhlucht Siúicre Éireann (Irish Sugar Co., now known as Greencore) in 1977. Four of these locomotives have been preserved, with the remainder scrapped.

== Fleet list ==
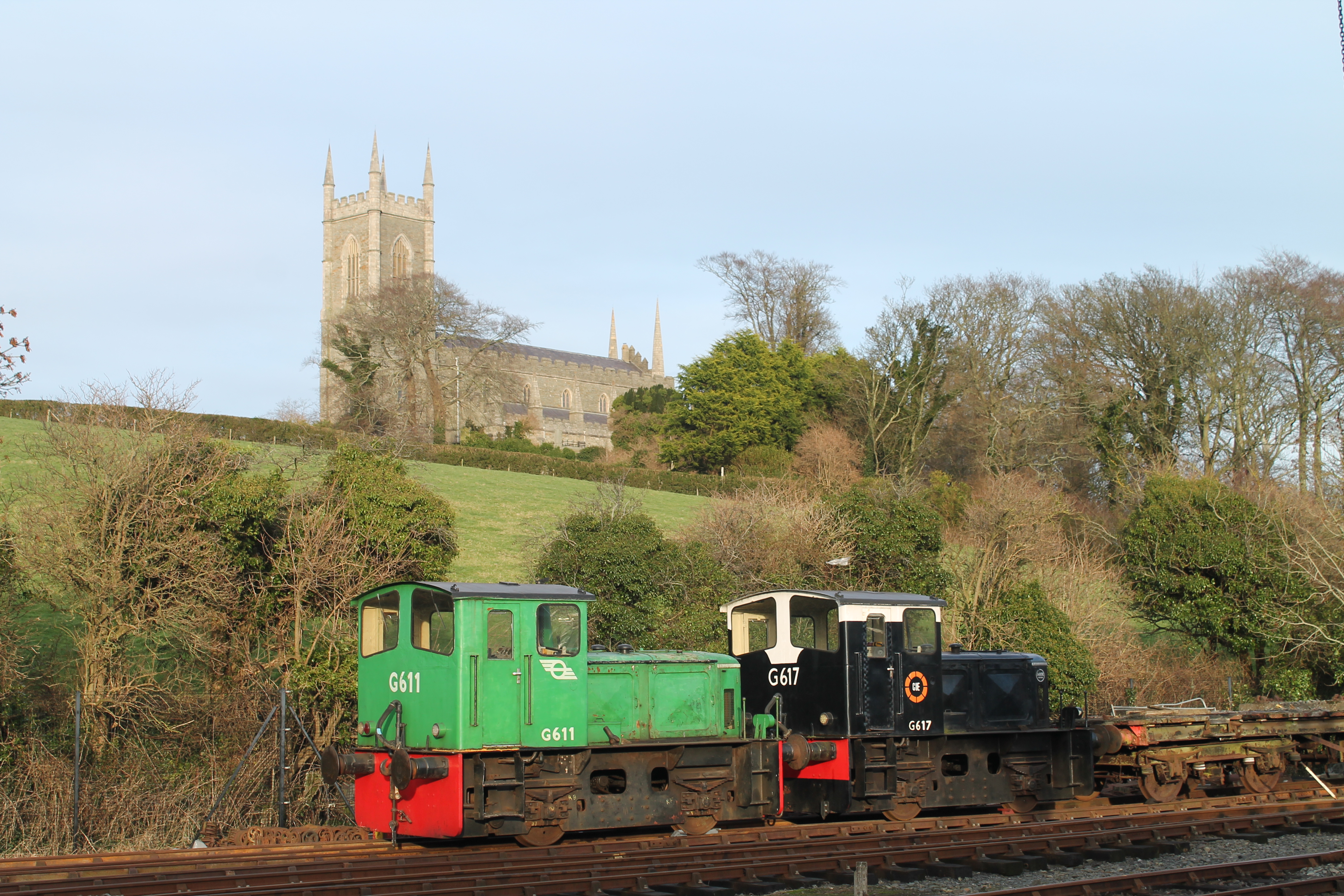
G611 & G617

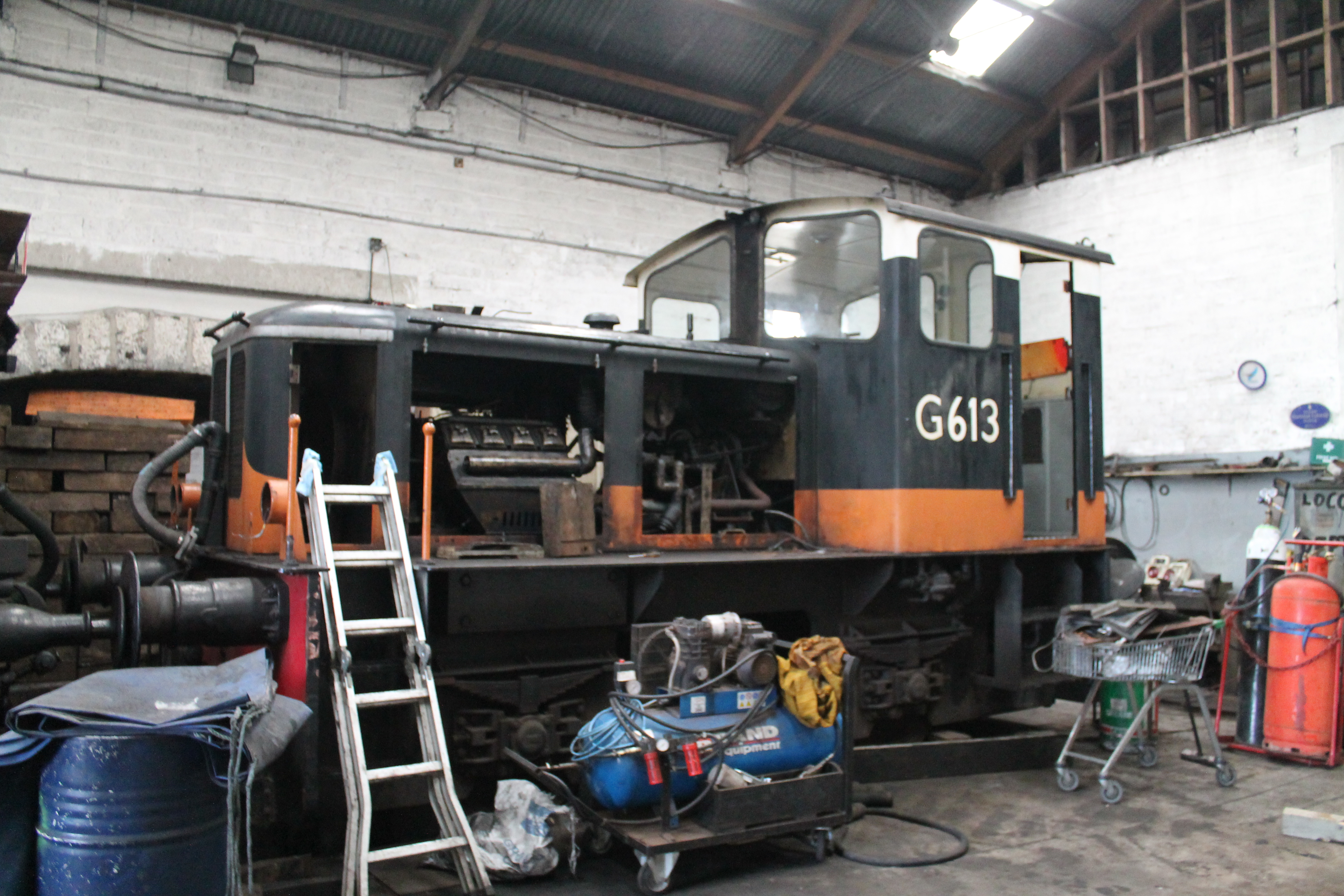
G613

Key:	Scrapped	Preserved

Number	Status	Notes
G611	Preserved	Owned by ITG at DCDR - fully operational
G612	Scrapped	
G613	Preserved	Privately owned, based at DCDR - partway through restoration
G614	Scrapped	
G615	Scrapped	Cab preserved privately
G616	Preserved	Owned by ITG at Carrick-on-Suir - under restoration
G617	Preserved	Owned by ITG at DCDR - fully operational

== Model ==
The 611 Class has been made as a 00 gauge brass kit by Worsley Works Models .
