= CIÉ 421 Class =

Irish diesel locomotive type

Córas Iompair Éireann E class (later 421 class)
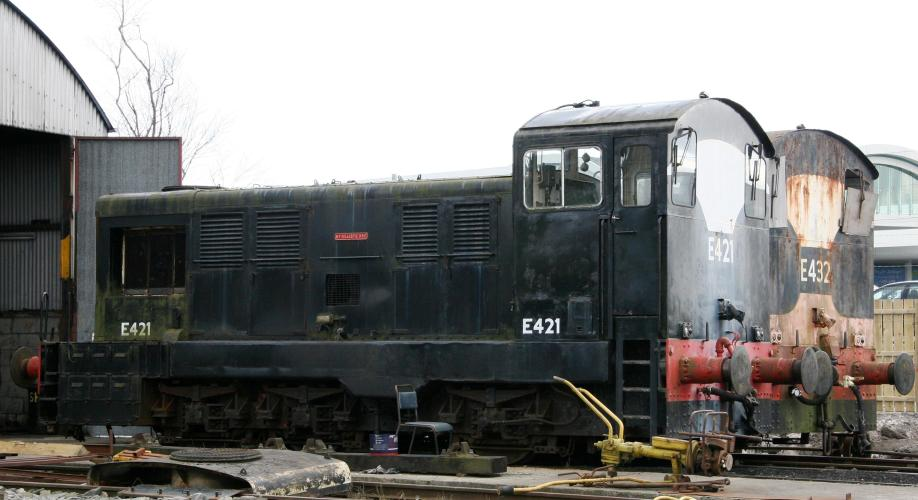
- E421 and E432 in 2008
Type and origin
- Power type: Diesel-hydraulic
- Builder: Córas Iompair Éireann, Inchicore works
- Build date: 1962
- Total produced: 14
Specifications
- Configuration
  - UIC: C
- Gauge: 1,600 mm (5 ft 3 in)
- Wheel diameter: 3 ft 2 in (965 mm)
- Length: 9.56 m (31 ft 4 in)
- Loco weight: 43.5 tonnes (42.8 long tons; 48.0 short tons)
- Prime mover: Maybach MD220
- Engine type: Diesel
- Transmission: Mekydro KL64U torque converter
- MU working: Yes
Performance figures
- Maximum speed: 40 km/h (25 mph)
- Power output: 420 hp (310 kW)
- Tractive effort: Starting: 26,700 lbf (119 kN)
Career
- Operators: Córas Iompair Éireann
- Numbers: E421–E434
- First run: 1962–1963
- Withdrawn: 1979–1983
- Disposition: 3 preserved, remainder scrapped

The Córas Iompair Éireann 421 Class was a railway locomotive, built by the CIÉ at Inchicore Works between 1962–1963 and designed for branch line traffic use and shunting.

== History ==
The 421 Class was a larger development of the earlier 401 Class, and were fitted with a Maybach MD220 engine of 420 horsepower (310 kW) with diesel hydraulic transmission via a Mekydro KL64U transmission. Unlike the earlier E401 class, these locomotives were fitted for multiple operation. They were of C wheel arrangement.

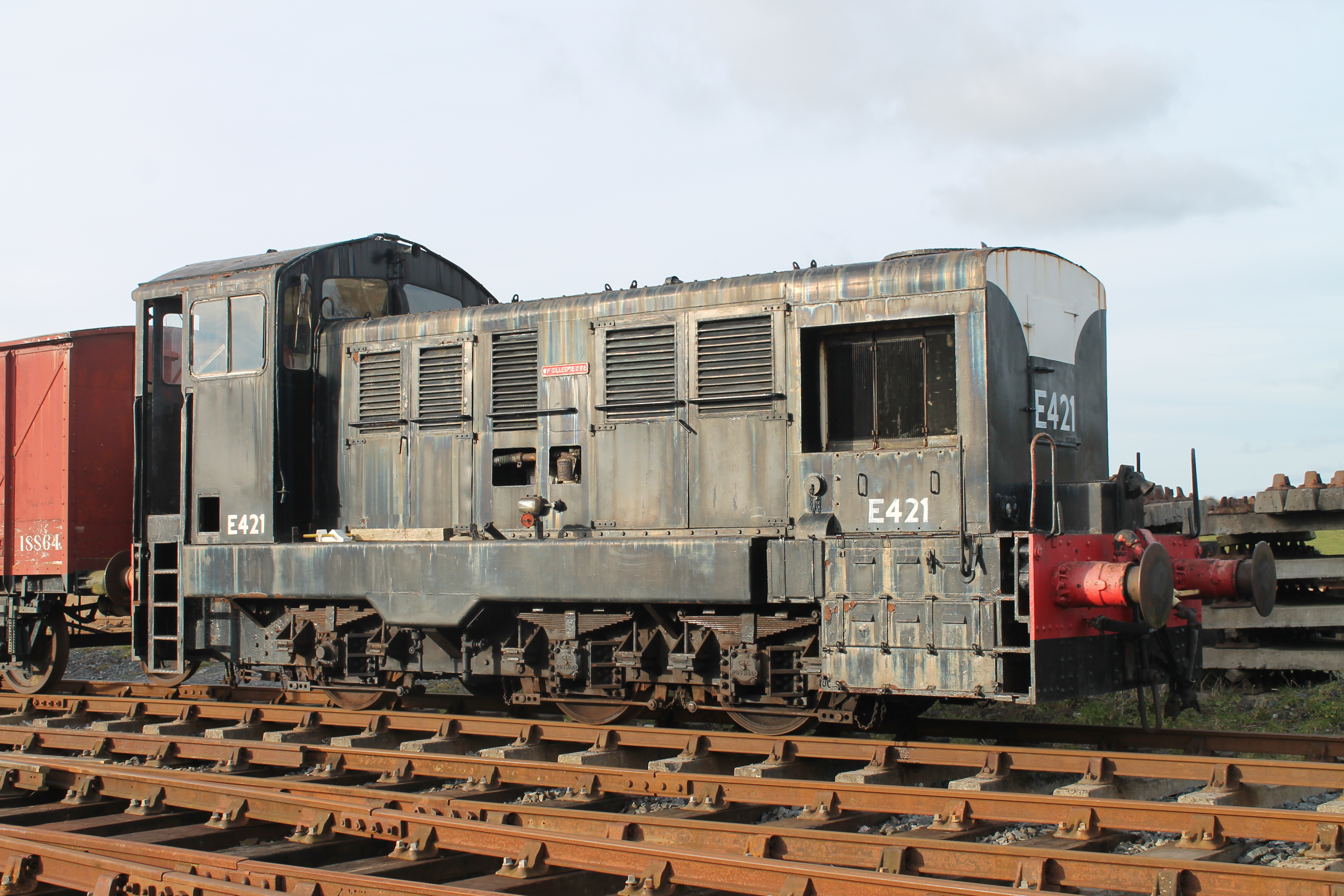
E421 At Downpatrick

The first of the class made its debut in early October 1962 on pilot duties in the Dublin area and although they had a design maximum speed of 100 km/h (62 mph), experience (notably the derailment of a trial train hauled by E421) showed that they did not ride well when travelling at speeds over 40 km/h (25 mph) and so henceforth were limited to that speed and used simply for shunting duties instead. They were numbered E421–E434, and were withdrawn from service between 1979 and 1983.

== Preservation ==
Three of these locomotives have been preserved, as follows:

- E421 and E432: Owned by and based at the Downpatrick and County Down Railway, Northern Ireland. Both locos are currently stored out of traffic, with E421's final year of operation being in 2010.
- E428 and E430 were both acquired by Westrail in January of 1984, with E430 being cannibalised as spares for E428, eventually being scrapped by late 1985. E428 was last operated sometime in 1993 when Westrail ceased operations, having moved to Inchicore Works at some point in the mid-90s. In around 2005, E428 was moved from Inchicore Works to Dunsandle, County Galway, under private ownership, where it remains to this day.

== Model ==
The E421 was available as a resin model from "Q Kits", but this company is no longer trading as the owner has retired.
