= BCDR 2 =

Class 2
Type and origin
- Power type: Diesel-electric
- Builder: Harland & Wolff
- Build date: 1933
- Total produced: 1
Specifications
- Configuration
  - Commonwealth: 1bo / 1B; 0-4-0 from 1951
- Gauge: 5 ft 3 in (1,600 mm)
- Loco weight: 33.0 long tons (33.5 t)
- Prime mover: H&W Harlandic TR4
Performance figures
- Maximum speed: 60 mph (97 km/h); 50 mph (80 km/h)
- Power output: 270 hp (200 kW)
- Tractive effort: 9,450 lbf (42.0 kN)
Career
- Operators: BCDR; NCC; UTA; H&W
- Number in class: 1
- Numbers: D1 (to 1937); 2; 202 (UTA)
- Withdrawn: 1967
- Disposition: Scrapped

The Belfast and County Down Railway (BCDR) Class 2 locomotive was built by Harland & Wolff (H&W) in 1933. The first diesel locomotive build by H&W it was initially designated D1. It often worked the branch to Ballynahinch. The UTA designated the locomotive 202 but returned it to H&W in 1951 to work the shipyards.
