= Mirrlees =

Mirrlees is a surname. Notable people with the surname include:

- Hope Mirrlees (1887–1978), English translator, poet and novelist
- James Mirrlees (born 1936), Scottish economist

== See also ==
- MAN Diesel, current owner of the diesel engine manufacturer, Mirrlees, Bickerton & Day
