= Castlerea Railway Museum =

Railway museum in Castlerea, Ireland

Coordinates: 53.7698°N 8.4948°W

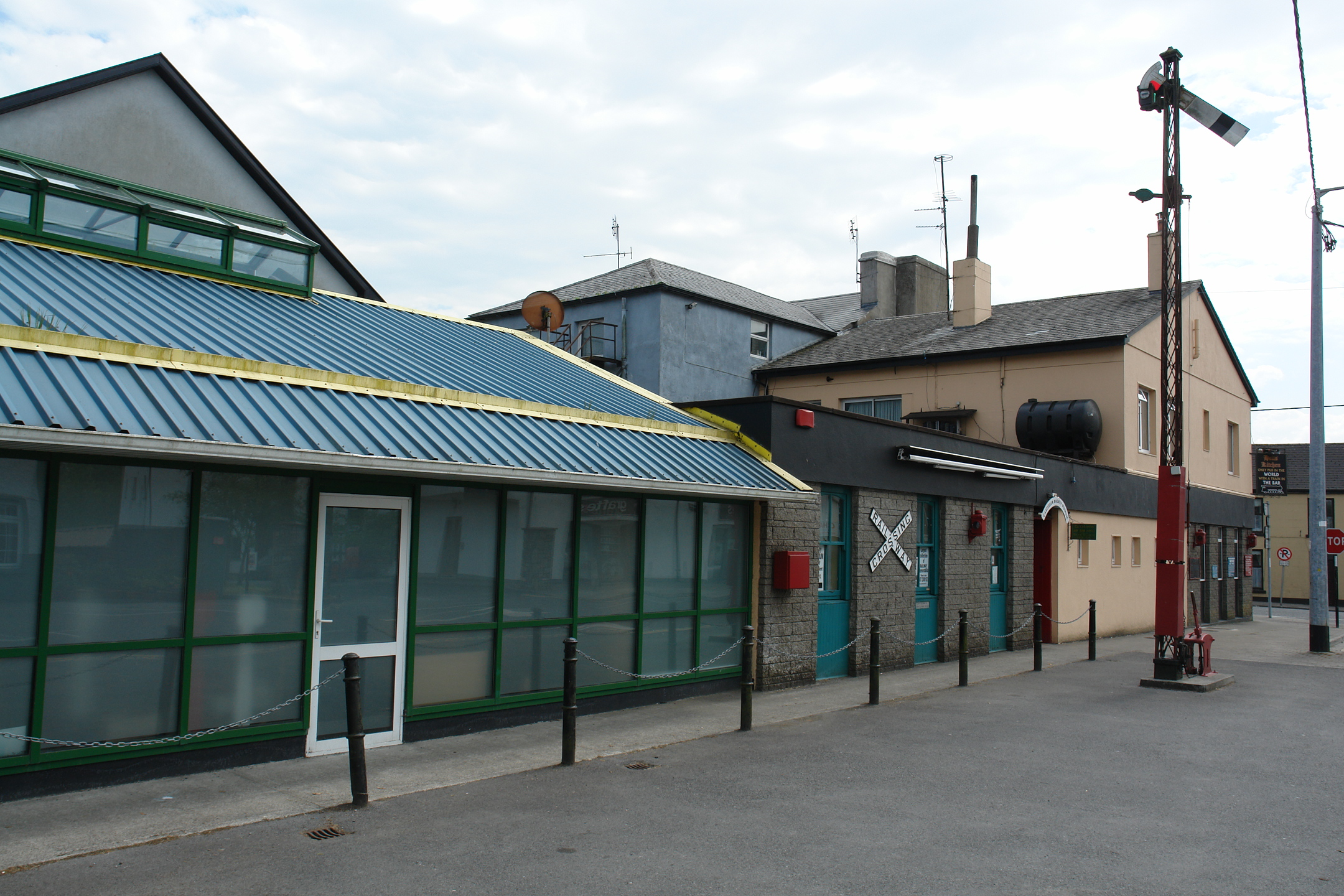
Museum exterior

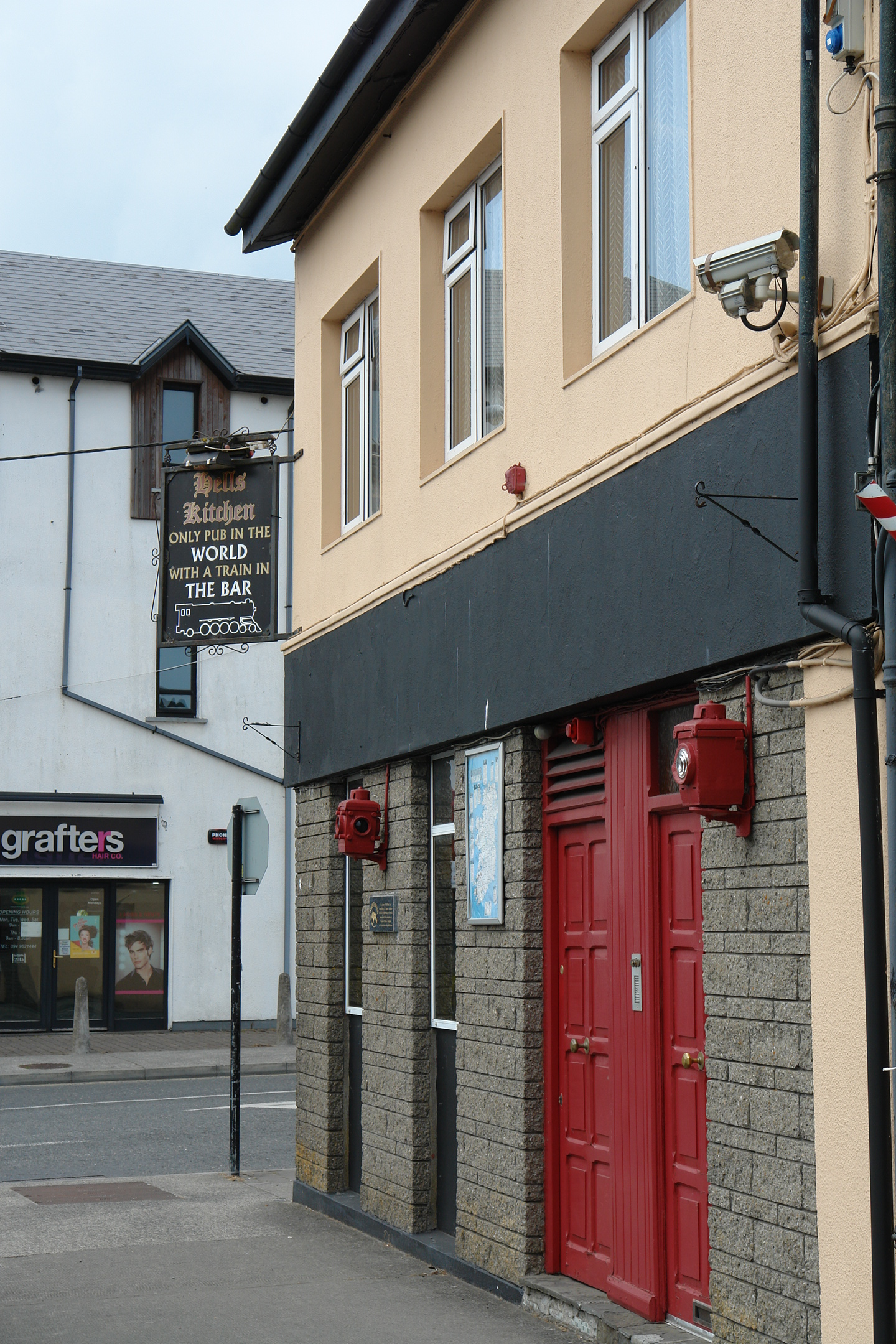
Signage at the Hells Kitchen Bar

Castlerea Railway Museum, formerly known as Hells Kitchen Railway Museum, is a private railway museum on Main Street, Castlerea, County Roscommon in Ireland.

== History ==
This small, privately-run, museum displays the collection of railway enthusiast Sean Browne, who began to collate railway memorabilia in the 1950s: Exhibits include signals, lamps, bells and tokens over warning plaques, posters, timetables and station boards. The first centrepiece of the museum was a Metropolitan-Vickers A Class locomotive, introduced in 1955 by Córas Iompair Éireann (CIÉ) as part of the "dieselisation" programme that helped eliminate steam on Irish railways by April 1963, and was acquired in 1994.

Browne purchased CIÉ 001 Class diesel locomotive no. 055 (earlier called A55), withdrawn as a result of the introduction of Iarnród Éireann 201 Class locomotives. As this locomotive is 51 ft (15.50 m) long and 14 ft (4.25 m) high and weighs 61 tonnes, it required major re-construction to bring this into the building. The locomotive, which would have cost £100,000 at the time of construction, was acquired from CIÉ by Sean Browne, as the only bidder, for a scrap value of £1,600. On 7 July 1998, the locomotive went on its last trip from Dublin to Castlerea, before it was installed in the Hell's Kitchen bar. At the time of its installation it was the "only pub of its kind in Ireland to uniquely feature a full-scale train within the bar".

One of the exhibits is the junction staff of the railway line from Ballaghaderreen to Kilfree Junction, the last piece of track on which steam locomotives were used, until it was closed in 1963.

On 10 January 1992, Seán Doherty, TD gave a television interview in the adjacent pub, which ultimately lead to the resignation of Taoiseach Charles Haughey.

As of 2012, the pub and bar on the site was reportedly closed.
