= G-class destroyer =

G-class destroyer may refer to:

- Beagle-class destroyer, a class of sixteen Royal Navy destroyers launched in 1909 and 1910
- G and H-class destroyer, a class launched in 1935–1939
- G class destroyer (1944), a proposed class of eight destroyers for the Royal Navy
