= NIR 1 Class =

Irish diesel locomotive

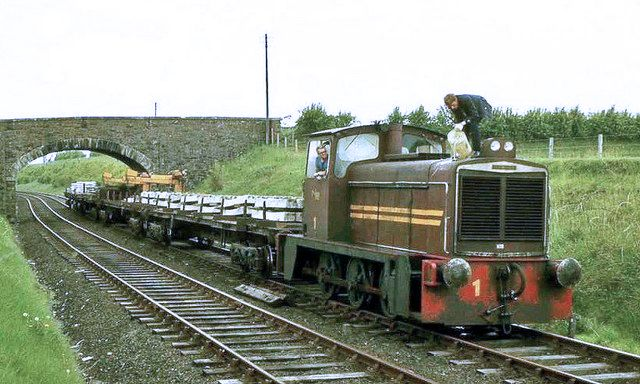
- NIR’s 1 class were prone to overheating. The driver is topping up No. 1’s radiator from an emergency supply of water carried on board.
Type and origin
- Power type: Diesel-hydraulic
- Builder: English Electric at Vulcan Foundry
- Serial number: EE: 3954–3956; VF: D1266–1268
- Model: Stephenson
- Build date: 1969
- Total produced: 3
Specifications
- Configuration
  - AAR: 0-6-0
  - UIC: C
- Gauge: 5 ft 3 in (1,600 mm) Northern Ireland; 5 ft 6 in (1,676 mm) Sri Lanka
- Wheel diameter: 3 ft 6 in (1,067 mm)
- Loco weight: 42.5 tonnes (41.83 long tons; 46.85 short tons)
- Prime mover: Dorman 12QTV
Performance figures
- Maximum speed: 29 mph (47 km/h)
- Power output: 620 hp (460 kW)
- Tractive effort: 25,000 lbf (111.21 kN)
Career
- Operators: Northern Ireland Railways
- Class: 1
- Numbers: 1–3
- Withdrawn: 1986–1989

The Northern Ireland Railways DH class was a class of three diesel-hydraulic shunting locomotives obtained in 1969. All three have now been withdrawn, and two have since been rebuilt for work in Sri Lanka.

== Early service life ==
The DH class of Northern Ireland Railways consisted of three diesel-hydraulic shunting locomotives numbered 1, 2 & 3. They were built by the English Electric Company at their Vulcan Foundry works in Newton-le-Willows in 1969. The works numbers 3954–3956 in the EE list, and D1266–D1268 in the VF list. They were of 0-6-0 wheel arrangement and fitted with Dorman 12QTV engines of 620 hp (460 kW), connected to an EE Twin Disc torque converter and a Wiseman final drive. They weighed 42.5 tonnes (41.83 long tons; 46.85 short tons) and had a maximum speed of 29 mph (47 km/h). They are often referred to with their, "DH," prefix.

The locomotives were of EE's standard 'Stephenson' class, and were obtained primarily for shunting work, trip freights and engineer's trains. Locomotive No. 1 was the first to enter service on 31 July 1969, with No. 2 following on 27 September and No. 3 on 4 October. However, the locomotives were not particularly successful due to problems with the engines overheating regularly while in service.

== Withdrawal from service and initial preservation ==
All three were put into store during the late 1980s, the first in 1986 and the last two in May 1989. The Irish Traction group had approached NIR in August 1989 hoping to run a farewell excursion with No. 2 in September 1989, but this plan failed after No. 2 suffered a catastrophic engine failure on Saturday 9 September 1989 (the day before the excursion), despite having been overhauled by NIR at York Road Works. Both Nos. 2 and 3 ended up in secure storage at Larne Harbour, where the Diesel engines, torque converters and final drives were removed in 1991.

It was originally intended to put the locomotives on display at Lisburn, Belfast Central, and Londonderry to celebrate the 150th anniversary of railways in Northern Ireland, and in mid-1989, locomotive No. 1 had its engine, torque converter and final drive removed at York Road works before being repainted in NIR red and moved to the Lisburn Engineer's yard; unfortunately, difficulties in placing the engine meant it was shunted to the back of the yard.

== Preservation ==
In September 1994, the Irish Traction Group purchased the three locomotives from NIR and moved them south to their restoration base at Carrick-on-Suir. Although Nos 2 and 3 were moved to Lisburn on Sunday 11 September 1994 to be reunited with No. 1, paperwork issues with Iarnród Éireann regarding the transport of the engines from Lisburn to Carrick-on-Suir meant that the locomotives did not move until Monday 7 January 1995 to Inchicore Works at Dublin, where they spent a week parked outside the running shed at Dublin Heuston. The move was completed on 14 January when the locomotives were towed from Dublin to Carrick-on-Suir.

When they moved to Carrick-on-Suir by rail, they formed the last recorded un-braked train in Ireland and were regarded as an "Engineers Special". Unfortunately, despite the best efforts of the ITG to prevent the locomotives from being vandalised while at Carrick-on-Suir, they were repeatedly attacked during their ten years of outside storage. This has prompted the ITG in recent times to construct large metal covers to protect any engines stored out of doors at Carrick-on-Suir, both from vandals and deterioration caused by the Irish weather.

During this period, it became clear that the ITG could not restore even one of the locomotives to running condition. The major cost was to replace the engine, torque converter and final drive, with prices in the area of £70,000 sterling to replace these components. Several engineering companies also queried whether the locomotives would be made available for sale, though the cost of replacing the engines and related drive components meant that these inquiries did not amount to much more than that. Since, two have been rebuilt for work in Sri Lanka; one is in storage in Wales.

== Return to Service ==
In 2005, the ITG was approached by Beaver Power Ltd, who wanted to buy the three locomotives for re-use in Sri Lanka. After much deliberation, the ITG sold Nos. 2 and 3 to Beaver for export to Sri Lanka, and moved to Merthyr Tydfil for overhaul and regauging to allow them to run on the 5 ft 6 in broad gauge tracks in Sri Lanka. Locomotive No. 1 was also sent to Merthyr Tydfil for parts recovery to enable the other two to be rebuilt to running condition. At the time, No. 1 was still owned by the ITG, and was not offered for sale until five years later.

In May 2006, Nos. 2 and 3 departed for Sri Lanka to work at a Holcim cement plant in the Puttalam area. The work included regauging to 5 ft 6 in (1676 mm), fitting of a Rolls-Royce CV12 750 hp Diesel engine coupled to a Twin Disc 13800 MS230 torque converter (both engines had lost their Diesel engines, torque converter and final drives in 1991), and repainting in Holcim livery.

In November 2010, the decision was made by the ITG to sell the stripped remains of No. 1 to Beaver, the sale being concluded on 28 November. This locomotive had lost its engine, torque converter and final drive in 1989, and was heavily stripped due to its use by Beaver as a spare parts unit. It is understood that the locomotive will be rebuilt for industrial service, whether in the UK or overseas.

It is understood that, as of 2010, locomotive No. 3 has been withdrawn and heavily stripped for parts. The locomotive still carries the white Holcim livery that it was painted in when first exported to Sri Lanka, while No. 2 was repainted into a blue and white livery: it is still in service. No. 2 has been named, "Shakhti", and No. 3, "Prince Vijaya" - nameplates adorn the cabsides of each locomotive. No. 2 has received a further repaint and now sports a red and white livery with yellow band.
