= CIÉ 401 Class =

Class of locomotives

Córas Iompair Éireann E class (later 401 class)
Type and origin
- Builder: CIÉ, Inchicore Works
- Build date: 1957–1958
- Total produced: 19
Specifications
- Configuration
  - UIC: C
- Gauge: 1,600 mm (5 ft 3 in)
- Wheel diameter: 3 ft 2 in (965 mm)
- Length: 8.95 m (29 ft 4 in)
- Loco weight: 39.4 tonnes (38.8 long tons; 43.4 short tons)
- Prime mover: Maybach MD220
- Transmission: Hydraulic, Mekydro KL64 torque converter
Performance figures
- Maximum speed: 40 km/h (25 mph)
- Power output: 420 hp (310 kW)
- Tractive effort: Starting: 97 kN (22,000 lbf)
Career
- Operators: Córas Iompair Éireann
- Class: E Class (later 401 class)
- Numbers: E401–E419
- Withdrawn: 1968–1977
- Disposition: All scrapped

The Córas Iompair Éireann 401 Class locomotives were built in 1957–1958 and designed for use on branch line traffic and shunting. They were fitted with a Maybach MD220 engine of 420 hp (310 kW), with diesel hydraulic transmission via a Mekydro KL64 transmission, and were of C wheel arrangement.

Though they had a design maximum speed of 100 km/h (62 mph), experience showed that they did not ride well when travelling at speeds over 40 km/h (25 mph) and so henceforth were limited to that speed. They were numbered E401–E419, and were withdrawn from service between 1968 and 1977 and none were preserved.

== Model ==
The E401 was available as a resin model from "Q Kits", but this company is no longer trading as the owner has retired.

A 401 Body is now available from Shapeways via Valvedesigns (a Rapid Prototyping Service)
