= CIÉ 601 Class =

G601 Class
Type and origin
- Power type: Diesel-hydraulic
- Builder: Motorenfabrick Deutz, Cologne, West Germany
- Serial number: 56118–56120
- Build date: 1956–1957
Specifications
- Configuration
  - UIC: B
- Gauge: 5 ft 3 in (1,600 mm)
- Driver dia.: 3 ft 1 3/8 in (949 mm)
- Length: 6.3 m (20 ft 8 in)
- Loco weight: 18.3 tonnes (18.0 long tons; 20.2 short tons)
- Prime mover: Deutz F8L 614, air-cooled
- Engine type: V8 Diesel
- Cylinders: 8
- Transmission: Voith hydraulic, chain drive final
Performance figures
- Maximum speed: 20 mph (32 km/h)
- Power output: 130 hp (97 kW)
Career
- Operators: Córas Iompair Éireann
- Number in class: 3
- Numbers: G601–G603
- Withdrawn: 1965–1972
- Disposition: One preserved, remainder scrapped by 1981

The Córas Iompair Éireann 601 Class locomotives were built in 1956-1957, by Motorenfabrik Deutz at Cologne, Germany. They were 3 small shunting locomotives (601, 602 & 603) of B wheel arrangement and were fitted with a Deutz V8 F8L 614 engine of 130 hp, with Voith hydraulic transmission and chain final drive. They weighed only 18 tons and had a maximum speed of 32 kilometres per hour (20 mph). These locomotives were never fitted with train brakes, so had limited usefulness compared to their successors, the G611 class. The G601 locomotives were withdrawn from service between 1965 and 1972.

== Preservation ==
One of these locomotives, number G601, has been preserved by the Irish Traction Group and is currently awaiting restoration at Carrick-on-Suir. In 2010 a secondhand engine was purchased to replace the seized engine currently fitted.

== Model ==
The 601 Class has been made as a 4 mm scale brass kit by Worsley Works. Steve Johnson's site also has details on kitbashing a model.
