= Dublin–Sligo railway line =

Railway line in Ireland

Dublin–Sligo
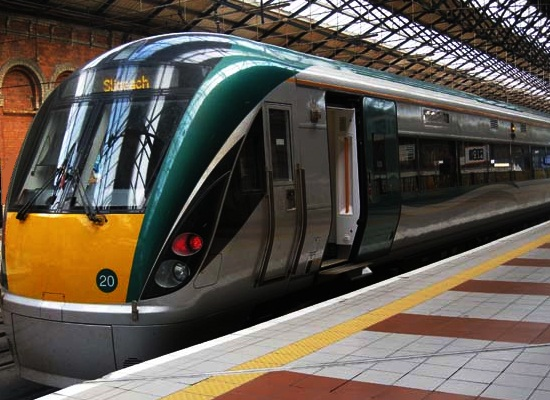
- 22000 Class DMU (22020) at Dublin Connolly forming a service to Sligo.

Overview
- Status: Operational
- Owner: Iarnród Éireann
- Locale: Ireland
- Termini: Dublin Connolly; Sligo Mac Diarmada
- Stations: 13

Service
- Type: Commuter rail, Inter-city rail Heavy rail
- System: Iarnród Éireann
- Services: InterCity: Dublin–Sligo; Western Commuter
- Operator(s): Iarnród Éireann
- Depot(s): Dublin Connolly
- Rolling stock: 29000 Class (Commuter); 22000 Class (InterCity and Commuter)

History
- Opened: 1847

Technical
- Line length: 216.05 km (134.25 mi)
- Number of tracks: Double track (Dublin Connolly–Maynooth); Single track with passing loops (Maynooth–Sligo)
- Character: Secondary
- Track gauge: 1,600 mm (5 ft 3 in) Irish gauge
- Electrification: Not electrified
- Operating speed: 121 km/h (75 mph)

The Dublin–Sligo railway line is a railway route operated by Iarnród Éireann in Ireland. It starts in Dublin Connolly station, terminating at Sligo Mac Diarmada railway station in Sligo. The route is a double-track railway as far as Maynooth, being a single-track railway with passing loops between there and Sligo.

Between Dublin and Longford, the line is served by the Western Commuter service, part of the Dublin Suburban Rail network. In 2018, 1.4 million passengers were carried on the line.

== History ==
The line would start construction as the Midland Great Western Railway (MGWR) was incorporated in 1845 to buy the Royal Canal between Dublin and Longford to build a parallel railway. The MGWR would receive assent in 1846 to branch off from Mullingar to further their planned Galway main line, and they would reach Mullingar on 2 October 1848, pausing work on the line to Longford to focus on the Galway line.

After Galway was reached in 1851, the MGWR would open as far as Longford on 8 November 1855. An extension to Sligo would be approved in 1857, and the line would open in full on 3 December 1862. After the Broadstone terminus' closure in 1937, most trains on the line would be diverted to Westland Row (now Pearse).

In 1973, the line would lose most its services as they were diverted to use the ex-GSWR branch towards Heuston.

== Route ==
The line is 216.05 kilometres (134.25 mi) long. From Dublin the route mostly bends alongside the Royal Canal to Mullingar along a fairly level gradient. Thereafter there are a number of gradients, with the sustained 1 in 80 between mileposts 75 1/4 and 70 3/8 towards Dublin noted as challenging.

== Services ==
Commuter operates the suburban services between Dublin and Maynooth. These run from Pearse Station, which connects with the line to Rosslare Europort. Some trains run from Bray through to Maynooth.

Two trains per day (Monday to Friday) operate Longford to Pearse in the morning and return from Connolly to Longford in the evening.

InterCity

- Monday–Friday

8 trains in each direction Dublin to Sligo

- Saturday

7 trains in each direction Dublin to Sligo

- Sunday

6 trains in each direction Dublin to Sligo

=== Former services in dieselisation era ===
There was a basic service pattern of 3 services a day, sometimes supplemented by an additional service from Dublin on Fridays and a very early morning service from Sligo on Monday mornings. The closure of many stations in 1963 enabled the service to be speeded up with over an hour reduction in journey time.

Freight trains from Sligo stopped when the final trains carrying logs from Sligo ceased in December 2008.

=== Dublin stations ===
InterCity services now commence and terminate at Dublin Connolly. Originally Broadstone railway station was the terminus. In the intervening years Pearse (Westland Row) was the starting point.

== Connections at Dublin Connolly ==
The line is also used by rail passengers changing at Dublin Connolly onto the DART to Dún Laoghaire or Bray for example or travelling to Dublin Port for the Irish Ferries or Stena Line to Holyhead and then by train along the North Wales Coast Line to London Euston and other destinations in England and Wales.

Dublin Port can be reached by walking beside the tram lines around the corner from Amiens Street into Store Street or by Luas one stop to Busáras where Dublin Bus operates route 53 to the Ferry Terminal or to take a taxi.

Passengers can change at Dublin Connolly for the Belfast–Dublin railway line for the Enterprise to east Ulster.

== Rolling stock ==
=== Current operations ===
InterCity services have been operated by 22000 Class DMUs since December 2007, the Dublin-Sligo route being the first in the whole of Ireland to get the new trains. They replaced the interim use of 29000 Class Commuter DMUs, which had been introduced to these services in 2005, having in turn replaced locomotive-hauled stock.

=== Previous dieselisation era operations ===
InterCity services saw haulage by CIÉ classes 001, 121, 141 and latterly 071 after they were displaced from mainline duties. 121 and 141 Classes would often work in multiple on the heavy midday trains and latterly to achieve faster timetables. The CIE 201 Class was rarer on passenger duties. Coaching stock could reach to about 13 coaches requiring multiple stops at some stations. Laminate and Park Royal coaching stock including 6-wheel luggage/generator vans were replaced in time by Cravens and eventually Mark 2 coaches with Mark 1 generator vans cascaded from mainline services.

CIÉ 2600 Class AEC DMUs were sometimes used on the morning and evening services up until 1969/70.

== See also ==
- Midland Great Western Railway
- Sligo, Leitrim and Northern Counties Railway
