= CIÉ 121 Class =

Irish diesel locomotive

Córas Iompair Éireann 121 Class
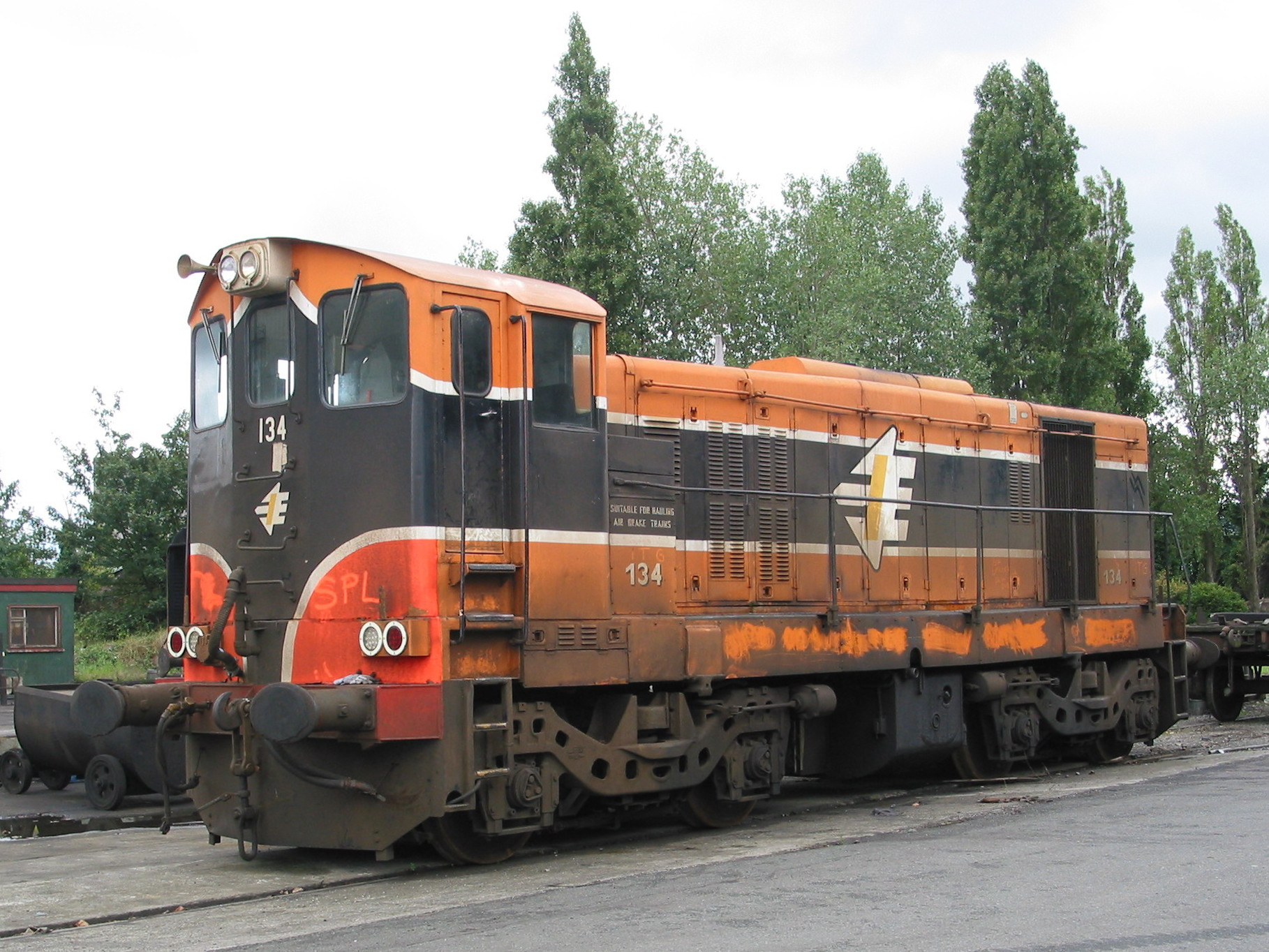
- Preserved 121 Class locomotive (134)
Type and origin
- Power type: Diesel-electric
- Builder: General Motors Electro Motive Division, La Grange, Illinois, USA
- Order number: 702667–702681
- Serial number: 26271–26285
- Model: EMD GL8
- Build date: December 1960 – January 1961
- Total produced: 15
Specifications
- Configuration
  - AAR: B-B
  - UIC: Bo′Bo′
- Gauge: 1,600 mm (5 ft 3 in)
- Wheel diameter: 40 in (1,016 mm)
- Length
  - Over buffers: 39 ft 10 in (12.14 m)
- Loco weight: 64 tonnes (63.0 long tons; 70.5 short tons)
- Prime mover: EMD 8-567CR; 126-129 re-engined with EMD 8-645E
- Engine type: Two-stroke diesel
- Aspiration: Roots-type supercharger
- Traction motors: EMD D47
- Cylinders: 8
- Transmission: D25 DC generator; DC traction motors
- Train brakes: Air and vacuum
Performance figures
- Maximum speed: 77 mph (124 km/h)
- Power output: EMD 8-567CR: 950 hp (710 kW); EMD 8-645E: 1,100 hp (820 kW)
- Tractive effort
  - Starting: 35,000 lbf (160 kN)
  - Continuous: 30,400 lbf (135 kN)
Career
- Operators: Córas Iompair Éireann; Iarnród Éireann
- Number in class: 15
- Numbers: B121–B135 (later 121–135)
- Withdrawn: 1986–2008
- Disposition: 2 preserved (124 & 134), 1 cab preserved (133), 13 scrapped

The Córas Iompair Éireann 121 Class were diesel-electric locomotives manufactured by General Motors Electro-Motive Division. These locomotives were in regular service on the Irish railway network until 2002, with the last two remaining in service until early 2008.

== History ==
The poor availability of the A and C class locomotives in the late 1950s together with the split of the cross-border Great Northern Railway in 1958 and the target to eliminate steam locomotives led CIÉ to urgently seek more diesel locomotives. Prior to 1961, almost all Irish diesel locomotives had been built in Great Britain, but CIÉ now turned to an American-style single cab road switcher design from General Motors. The 121 Class were manufactured from December 1960 to January 1961 and numbered B121 to B135 inclusive. The locomotives proved an immediate success, with low maintenance and high availability, and led to further orders from the same supplier starting with the 141 class.

The 121 Class were the first locomotives to be exported to Europe from EMD's plant at La Grange. The layout of the cab was quite different from the other CIÉ diesel models of the time, with the controls to the side of the driver, rather than the front. Due to reduced visibility when operating with the cab trailing, it was decided that these locomotives should only operate in a cab-leading formation. Later conversion for multiple-unit working allowed two 121 Class locomotives to be coupled hood-end to hood-end, removing the need to turn them around for their return journey.

Although originally fitted with an EMD 8-567CR engine of 960 horsepower (720 kW), all were later fitted with 645 type "power packs" (piston & liner assemblies) for parts standardisation, while at the same time keeping their original power output for reliability reasons. They weighed 64 tonnes (63.0 long tons; 70.5 short tons) and had a maximum speed of 123 km/h (76 mph). Numbers B126–B129 were later rebuilt with an EMD 8-645E engine of 1,100 hp (820 kW); as used in the 181 Class locomotives. The engine blocks were originally recycled from withdrawn rebuilt 201 Class locomotives, but in their later years much swapping of engines occurred between classes 121, 141 and 181. From the early 1970s onwards several locomotives of this class dropped the "B" prefix from their fleet number when re-liveried.

== Operations ==
By the late 1980s the main passenger services worked by the 121 Class were trains from Dublin Connolly to Sligo and Rosslare.

From the late 1980s the 121 Class were also used on outer suburban services from Dublin to Dundalk, Arklow and Maynooth. They operated as push-pull trains with new Inchicore-built, British Rail Mark 3 based carriages, until being replaces by diesel multiple units in the mid-1990s. These were the last regular passenger duties for the 121 Class within Greater Dublin. The Limerick shuttle continued to be worked by 121s for several years after this date.

Their last official scheduled mainline passenger working was on 9 July 2005 on the Sligo line. The last known passenger working of this class was the 13:15 Waterford-Heuston service on 18 January 2007. Previously, these locomotives had filled in on the Manulla-Ballina service or occasionally services from Limerick.

== Withdrawal ==
The first member of the class to be withdrawn was 125 on 6 March 1986 following an electrical fire, though it had been extensively damaged in an accident twelve years previously. However it was not scrapped until 2002.

By 1995, the 201 Class had replaced the 121 Class on most passenger routes. Throughout the late 1990s the fleet dwindled, and by 2005 only numbers 124 and B134 remained in service, with 123 in storage for five years until eventually being scrapped in 2008. The rest of the fleet was also scrapped, due to the decline in freight traffic that they were also used for.

The last use of 121 Class locomotives was in the early months of 2008 on maintenance trains. By this stage 124 and 134 were the only survivors and both were officially withdrawn on 31 March 2008.

== Livery ==
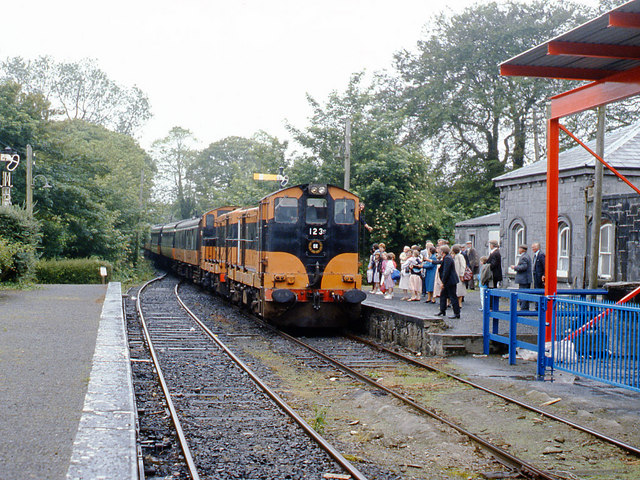
Special passenger train at Gort station on the Western Railway Corridor in 1986

On delivery, the locomotives were painted in a grey and yellow livery. by a black and tan (golden brown) colour scheme with a thick white band similar to the Cravens coaching stock, delivered in 1963. With time, the colour scheme changed to tan with a black band. Soon after CIÉ rail services became known as Irish Rail, two thin white bands were added separating the colours. At the same time, as a safety aspect, self-adhesive high-visibility panels were added to the front of the locomotives.

== Preservation ==
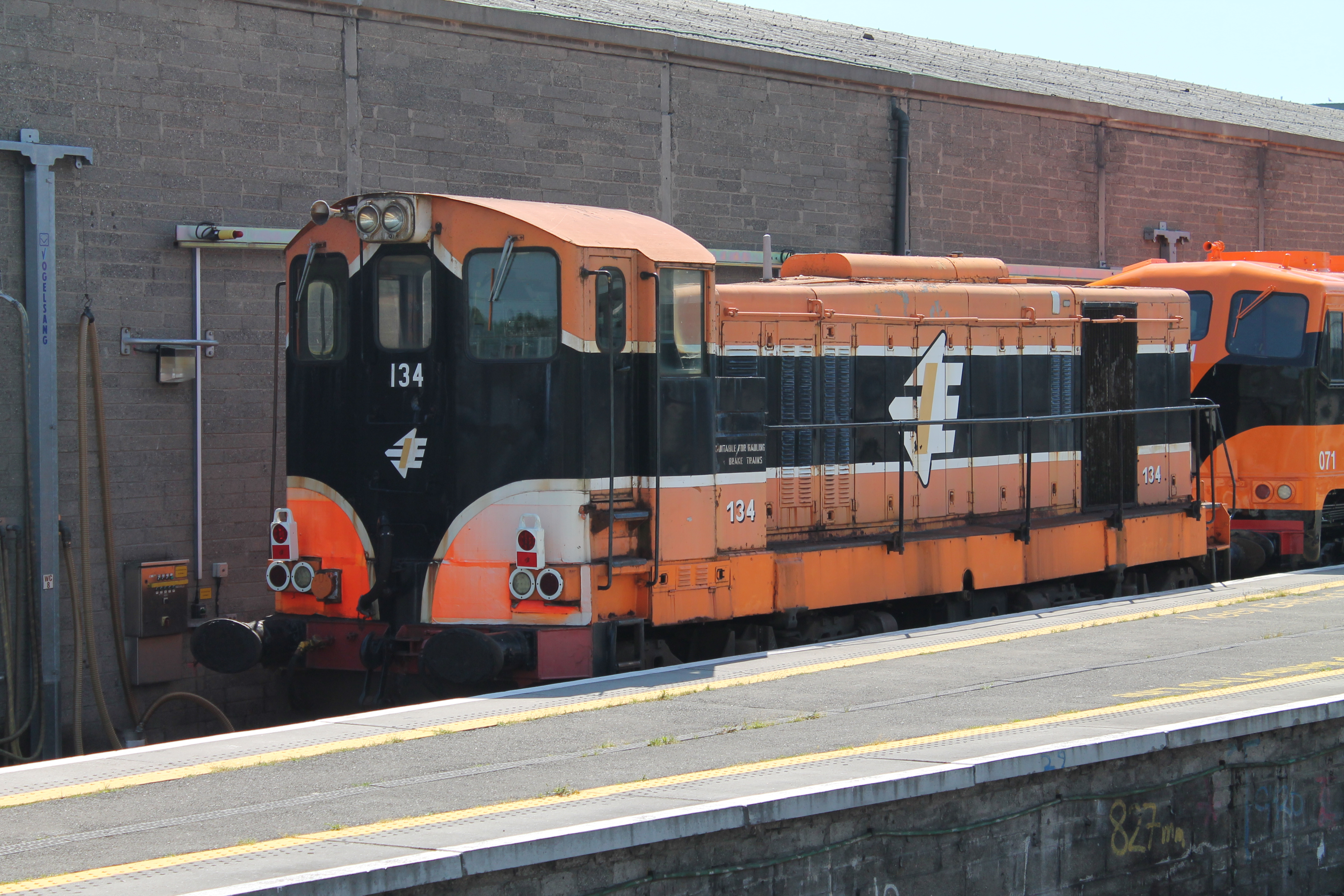
No. 134, preserved by the Railway Preservation Society of Ireland at Dublin Connolly

The Irish Traction Group has preserved locomotive 124. After withdrawal in 2008, 124 was kept in Inchicore Works until November 2009 when it was moved to Moyasta Junction on the West Clare Railway for storage. After 16 years, it left Moyasta on 31 May 2025 and was relocated to Downpatrick railway station on the preserved Downpatrick & County Down Railway, where it arrived the following day.

The other surviving member of the class, locomotive B134, is owned by the Railway Preservation Society of Ireland (RPSI), and is undergoing restoration. On 19 July 2016 it was hauled by 071 Class locomotive 071 from Inchicore to the RPSI's locomotive shed at Dublin Connolly. Later that year it was returned to Inchicore. In 2021 it was given a protective top-coat in older IE grey (per 071 class) with plans for final fitments. On 7 May 2022, 134 was displayed at an Inchicore Works open day and a commemorative plaque was unveiled on the locomotive, much like 141 Class number 150 during 1996.

On 23 August 2025, the ITG’s 124 became the first 121 Class locomotive to work a passenger train in preservation, as part of a diesel gala at the Downpatrick and County Down Railway.

The cab of locomotive 133 is preserved at the Cavan & Leitrim Railway in Dromod, County Leitrim.

=== Preservation status ===
Number	Owner	Status	Livery	Notes
124	ITG	Operational	IÉ (1994)	DCDR, Downpatrick
133	Cavan & Leitrim Railway	Cab Only	IÉ (1994)	Dromod
B134	RPSI	Restoration	Grey & Yellow Stirpes (1960)	Inchicore Works

== Models ==
The 121 Class has been made as a 00 gauge whitemetal kit by Model Irish Railways.

Murphy Models released an 00 gauge ready to run model of the 121 Class in 2020, with variants covering different CIÉ, IR and IÉ liveries and the RPSI's locomotive. model.

== See also ==
- Diesel locomotives of Ireland
