= Irish Traction Group =

Irish locomotive preservation society

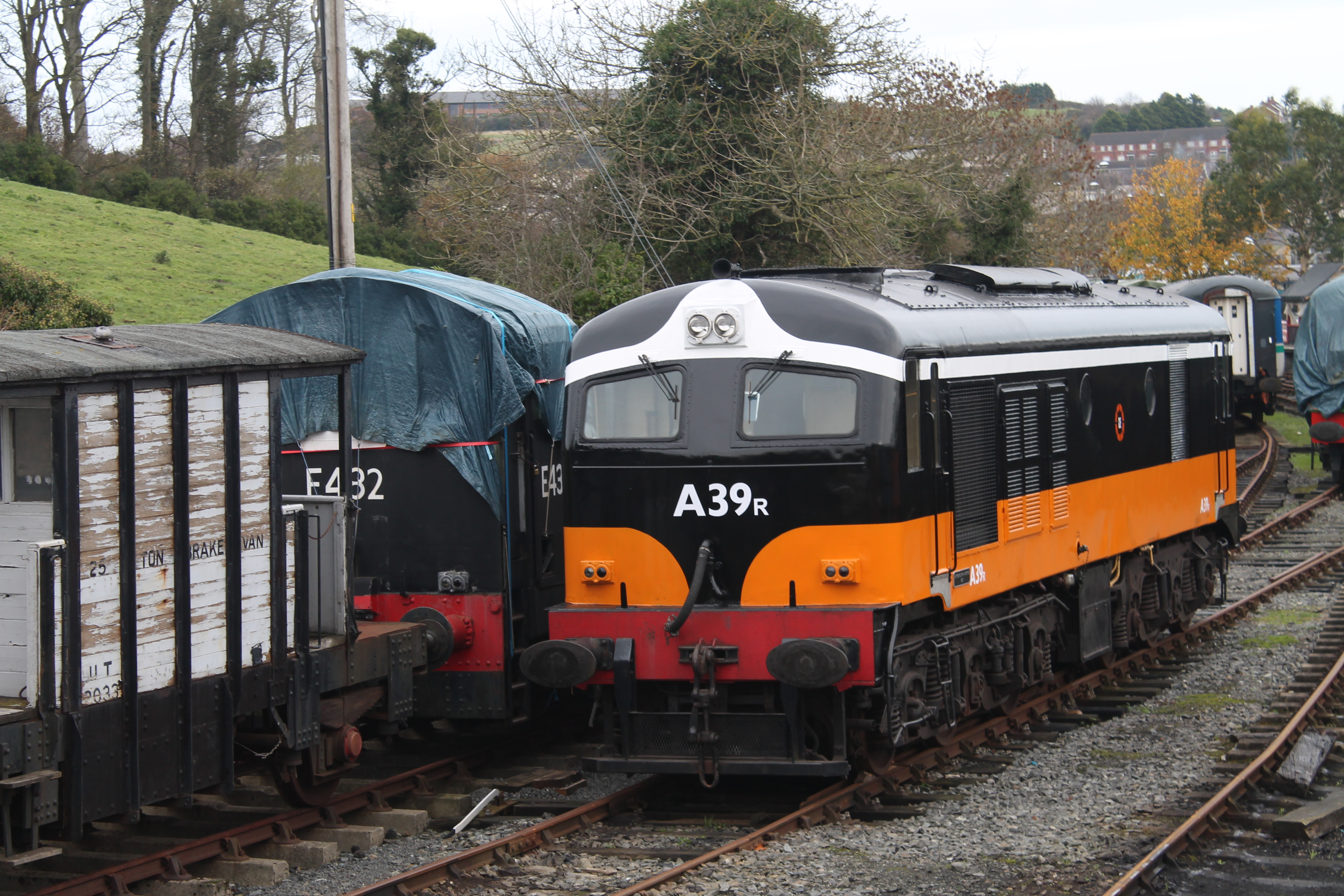
- ITG-owned locomotive No. A39R, based at the Downpatrick and County Down Railway
- Abbreviation: ITG
- Formation: 1989
- Headquarters: Carrick-on-Suir
- Locations: Carrick-on-Suir; Downpatrick
- Main organ: The Irish Mail
- Website: www.irishtractiongroup.com

The Irish Traction Group (ITG) is a railway preservation society dedicated to preserving diesel locomotives from Irish railways. It was founded on 4 June 1989 with the intention of attempting to preserve at least one example of every type of diesel locomotive to have operated on the Irish Rail system. The ITG's locomotives and work are spread across two sites: Carrick-on-Suir railway station, and the Downpatrick and County Down Railway (DCDR).

== Locations ==
When the ITG was first set up, Iarnród Éireann (IÉ) were reluctant to sell any locomotives to the group until they had a location to store them. IÉ offered the group use of the disused goods sheds at Portarlington or Carrick-on-Suir in December 1990. Portarlington was initially preferred due to its better condition, connection to the Dublin–Cork mainline, and closer proximity to Dublin city. However, IÉ's decision to instead redevelop the property in May 1991 left the ITG with Carrick-on-Suir as the only choice. The group had also briefly investigated the possibility of sharing a base with the now-defunct Tuam-based preservation society Westrail, but IÉ rejected this.

=== Current locations ===
==== Carrick-on-Suir ====
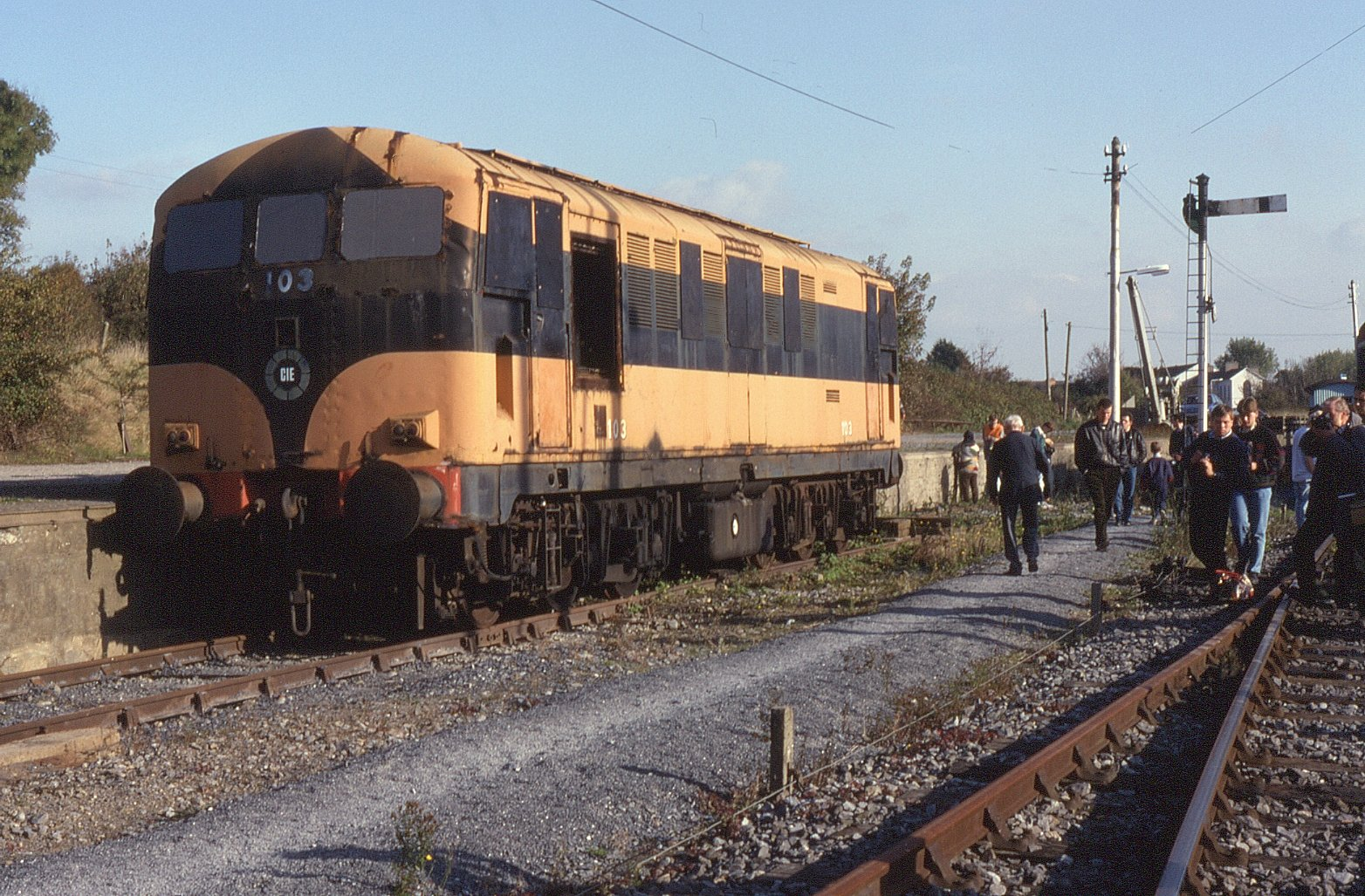
B103 at Carrick-On-Suir shortly after it arrived there in 1993. The locomotive is now stored under a protective casing awaiting overhaul.

The former goods shed at Carrick-on-Suir is the ITG's headquarters and main restoration base. The ITG moved into the site in May 1992, with one initial year of free rent to restore the building. The first locomotives (226 and C231) arrived on site in December 1992, and since then 10 locomotives have been stored or repaired there at various times. In 2013, the ITG's siding was disconnected from the Limerick - Waterford line as part of rationalisation work by IÉ, leaving the shed isolated from the mainline network.

Present work at Carrick-on-Suir is focused on restoring 226, while B103 and G601 are stored outside under protective steel covers. G616 is currently stored inside the shed in a partially dismantled state, the results of an overhaul started in 1993 but stopped in 1996 due to a lack of volunteers to continue work on the locomotive. Work resumed on this locomotive in early 2012. The engine was started for the first time in some 26 years on Saturday 29 September 2012.

==== Downpatrick ====
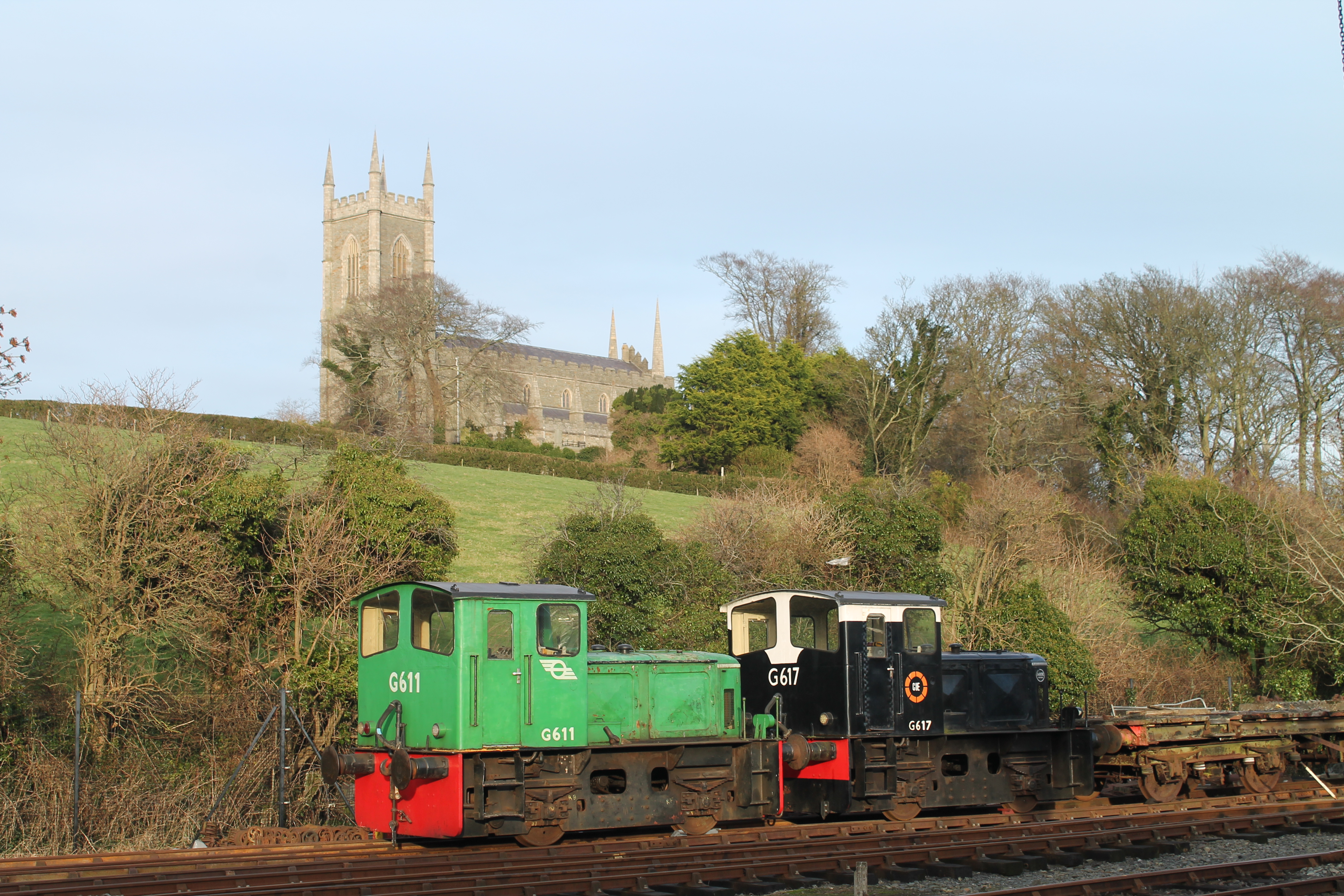
ITG-owned G611 and G617 at Downpatrick. These were the first ITG locomotives at Downpatrick, arriving in the mid-1990s.

The Downpatrick and County Down Railway is the only Irish standard gauge heritage railway in Ireland. ITG locomotives have been based there since 1995, when G617 was sent to the railway on long term loan. It has since been joined by G611 (1996), A39R (2009), 146 (2010), C231 (2014), and most recently 124, 190, 152, and A3R (2025). The ITG's Wickham inspection railcar No. 712 has also been based at DCDR since 1998 and is currently in long-term storage.

Locomotive 146 is the main workhorse of the ITG fleet at Downpatrick, and has been in near-continuous use since its arrival in 2010. G617 and A39R are also fully operational, and are used for shunting and special diesel-hauled passenger trains respectively. 124 and 190 are more recent arrivals and are currently undergoing overhaul to be made operational. G611, C231, and A3R are all stored awaiting overhaul. 152 was originally acquired by the ITG as a source of spare parts for 124, 146, and 190, and is stored at Downpatrick for piecemeal cannibalization as needed for those three locomotives.

=== Former locations ===
==== Inchicore Works ====
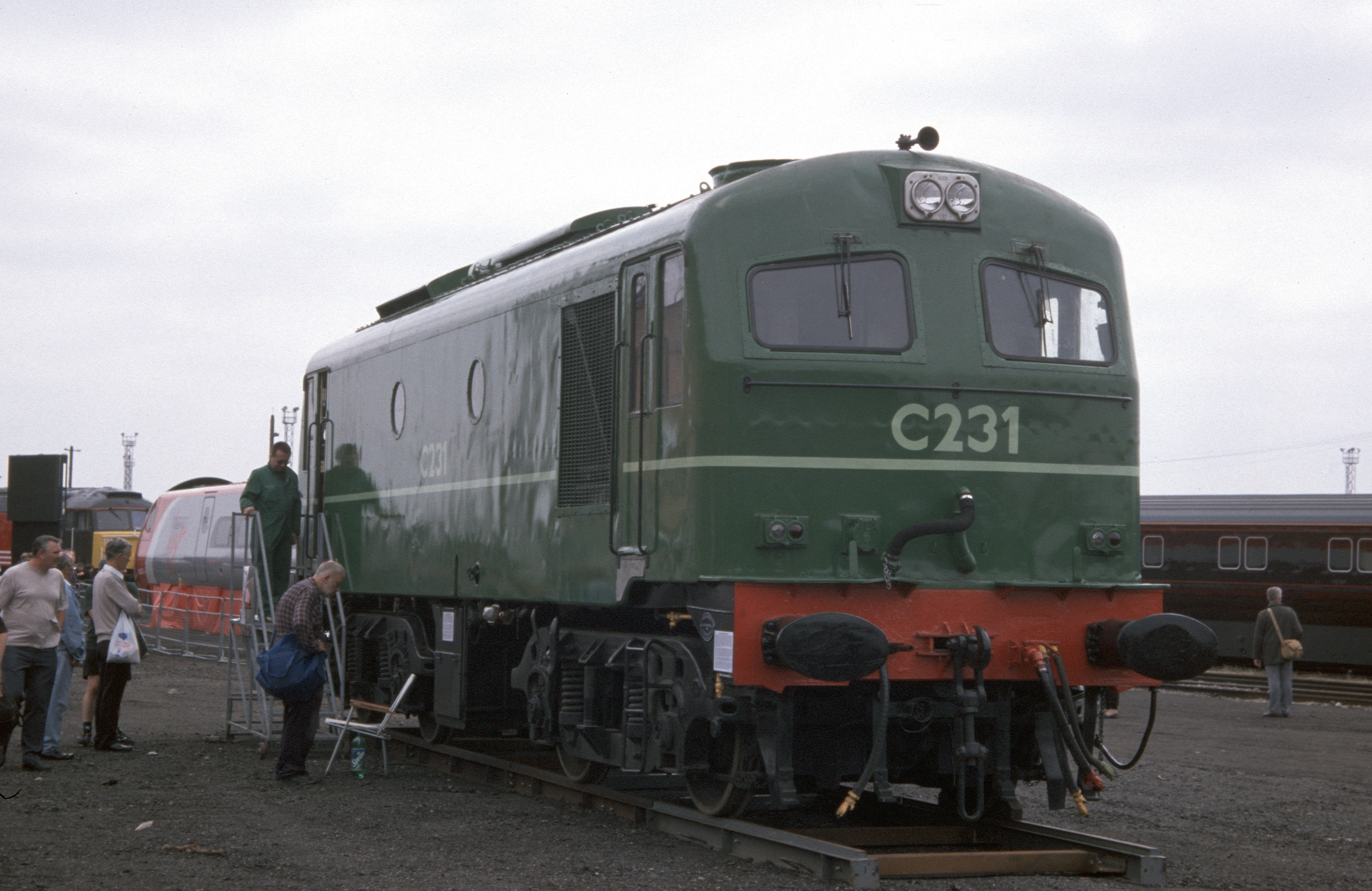
C231 at an open day in Old Oak Common Depot in England. The locomotive had been in England for work and was stored at Inchicore after returning to Ireland in 2000.

In 1995, the ITG purchased its two A Class locomotives (A3R and A39R) from Iarnród Éireann (IÉ). The locomotives were located at IÉ's Inchicore Works in Dublin, and it was agreed that they could remain there with ITG being permitted access to work on them. They were joined in 2000 by C Class loco No. C231. In November 2009, the A3R and A39 locomotives were moved to other sites.

In November 2009 the ITG acquired 124 and 190, which were also located in Inchicore, and by the end of that month they had been moved to Moyasta Junction on the West Clare Railway along with A3R and C231. A39R was moved to the Downpatrick and County Down Railway at the same time.

In November 2010 the ITG purchased 141 Class locomotives 146 and 152, which were again located at Inchicore. The locomotives were moved to Downpatrick and Moyasta respectively shortly after purchase.

==== Moyasta ====
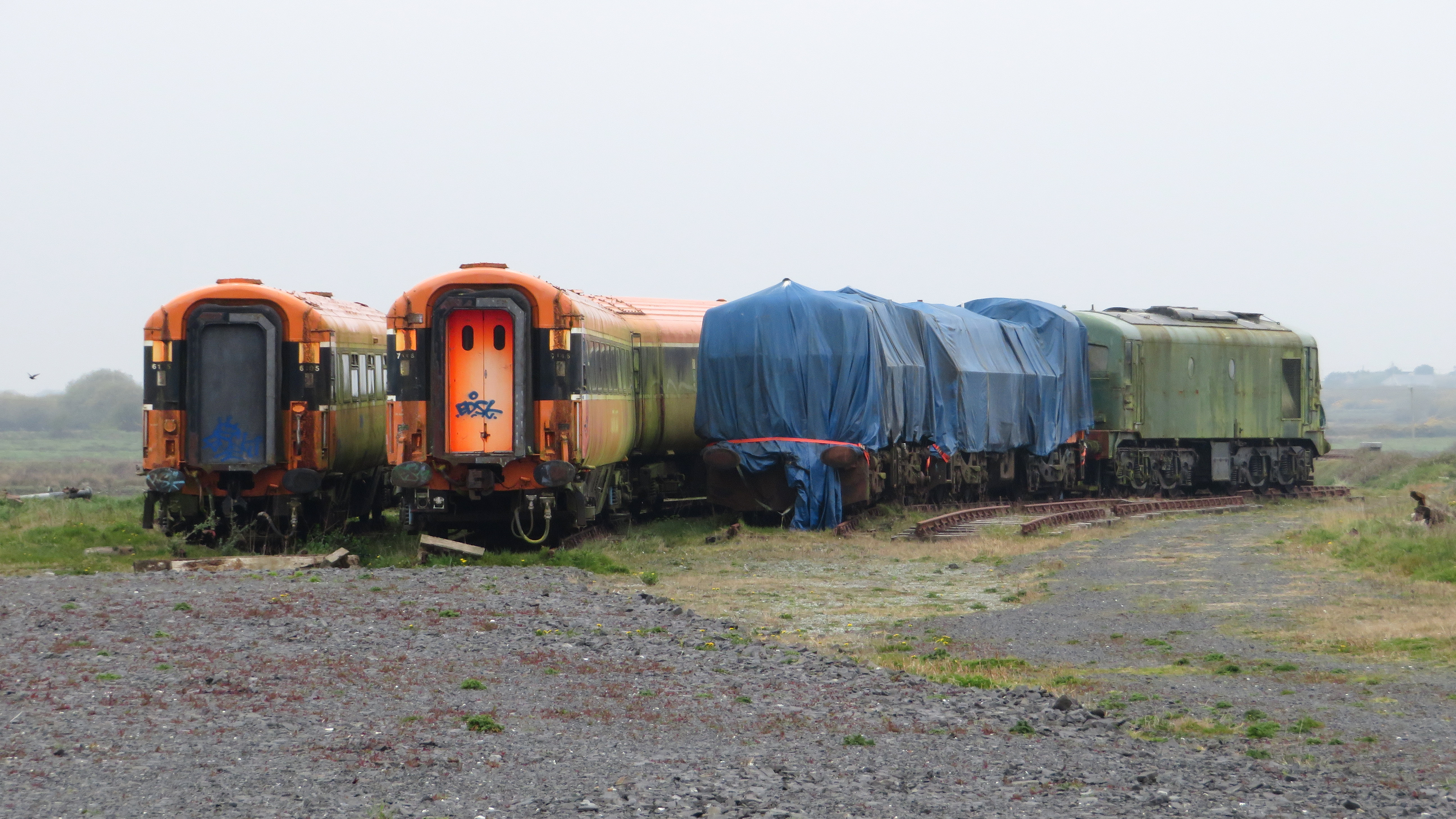
190 and 124 stored under tarpaulins at Moyasta in 2019, alongside some privately-owned Mark 3 carriages at the West Clare Railway's own A Class locomotive No. A15.

From 2009 to 2025, the ITG stored some of their locomotives at Moyasta Junction on the West Clare Railway. A3R, C231, 124, and 190 were moved to Moyasta in November 2009, being joined by 152 in November 2010. The West Clare Railway had been planning to build a museum which could accommodate both its own 3 ft gauge vehicles and the ITG's 5 ft 3 in vehicles.

C231 was relocated to the Downpatrick and County Down Railway in June 2014 to take part in the ITG's 25th Anniversary diesel gala later that year; it did not return. By 2025 there was still no progress with the museum at Moyasta, so the ITG began relocating the remaining vehicles from there to Downpatrick in a process which came to be known as "Moyexit". 124 and 190 left Moyasta on 31 May that year, followed by 152 on 7 June and A3R on 26 July, bringing the ITG's 16-year presence at Moyasta to an end.

== Operations ==
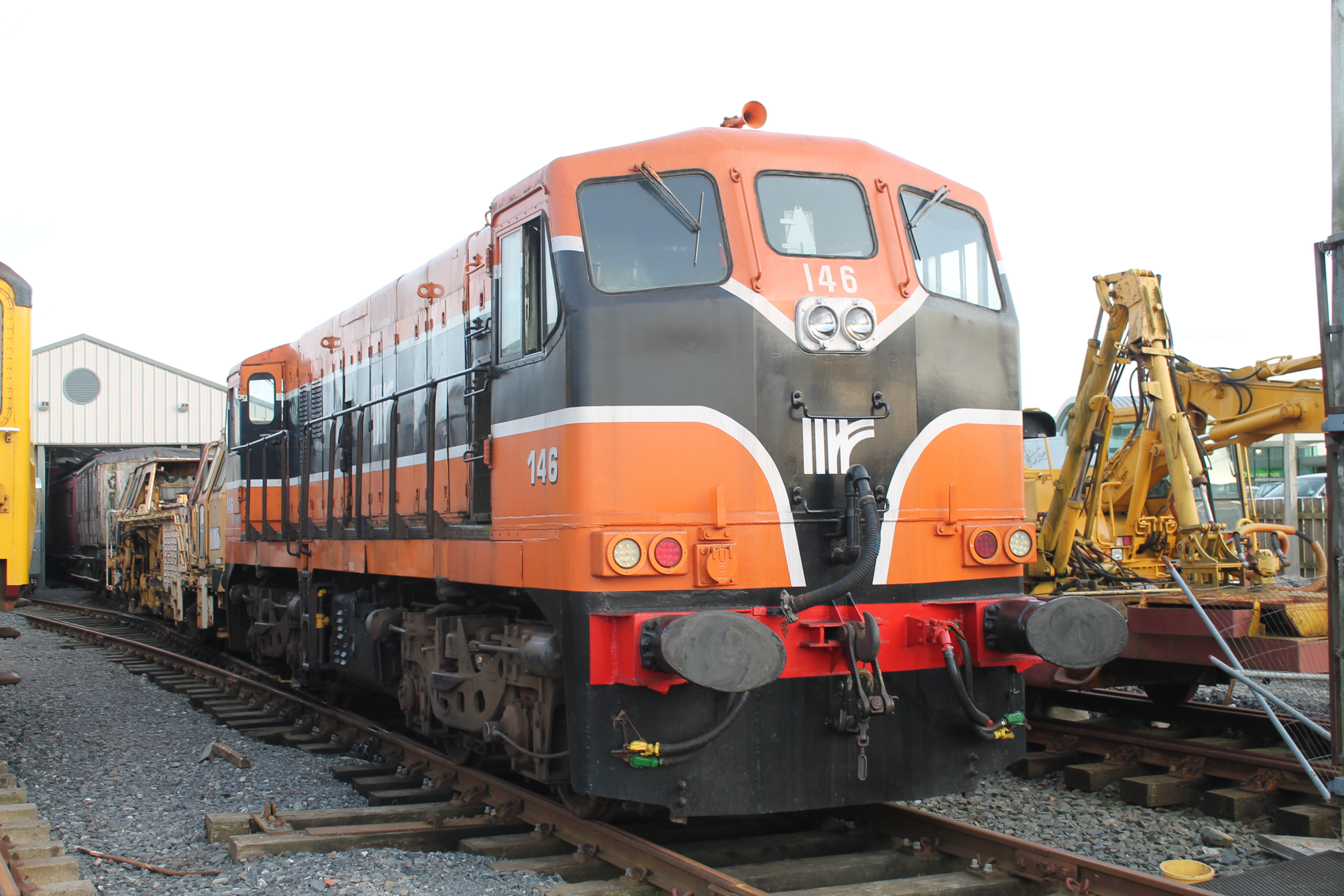
146 at the Downpatrick and County Down Railway.

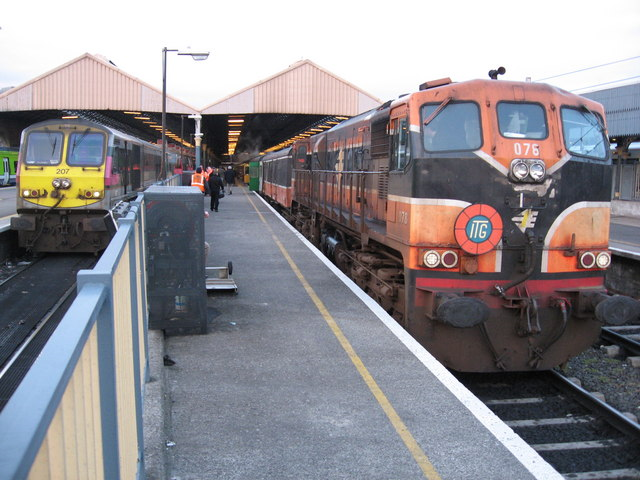
The ITG's final railtour, the 141 Class Farewell Tour, at Dublin Connolly in March 2010.

=== Restoration ===
At present, the ITG have four vehicles at their Carrick-on-Suir site and ten at Downpatrick in various states of repair. Restoration work on these vehicles is carried out by volunteers at both these locations.

=== Heritage diesel trains and galas ===
The ITG does not have any track or carriages of its own, but the locomotives based at Downpatrick are considered part of a pooled fleet along with DCDR's own locomotives. ITG locomotives are regularly used at Downpatrick to haul heritage passenger trains using DCDR carriages. They also perform shunting, private charters, and empty coaching stock movements for DCDR. 'Diesel Gala' events using multiple ITG locomotives and DCDR's own diesels are held regularly, such as in 2012 (to mark 146 turning 50 years old), 2014 (to mark the ITG's 25th anniversary), and 2019 (to mark the ITG's 30th anniversary).

=== The Irish Mail ===
The ITG publishes a quarterly journal for its members called The Irish Mail, named after the train and ferry service from England to Ireland that the group's members and volunteers used in its early days.

=== Railtours ===
From 1989 to 2010, the ITG operated over 40 railtours on the Irish railway network, using a mixture of its own locomotives and hired locomotives from Iarnród Éireann and Northern Ireland Railways. During the 1990s, some of these tours were operated by NIR Class 111 engines. These railtours ceased in 2010 with the 141 Class Farewell Tour.

== Locomotives ==
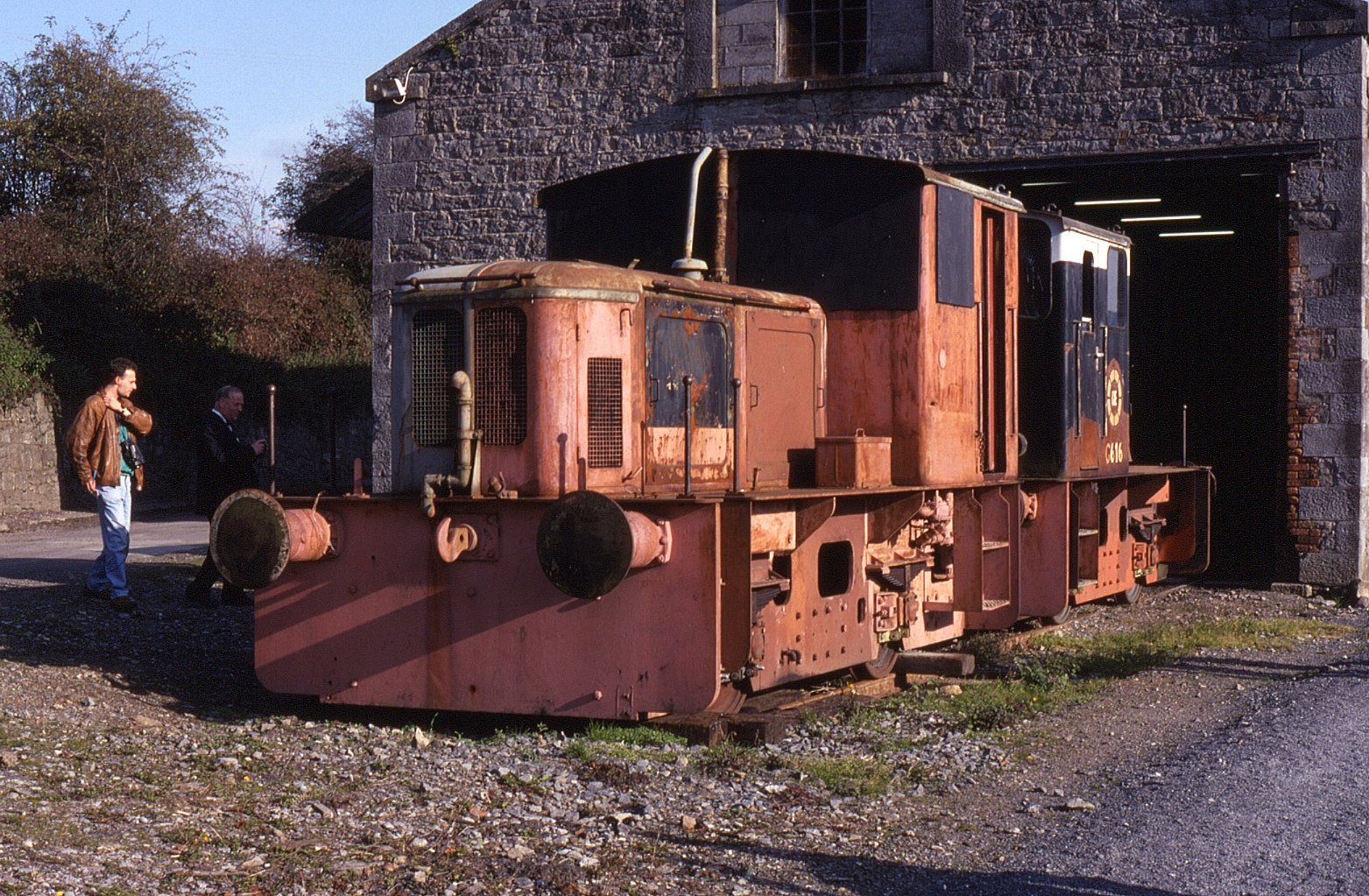
G611 Class locomotives G617 and G616 while under restoration at Carrick-on-Suir

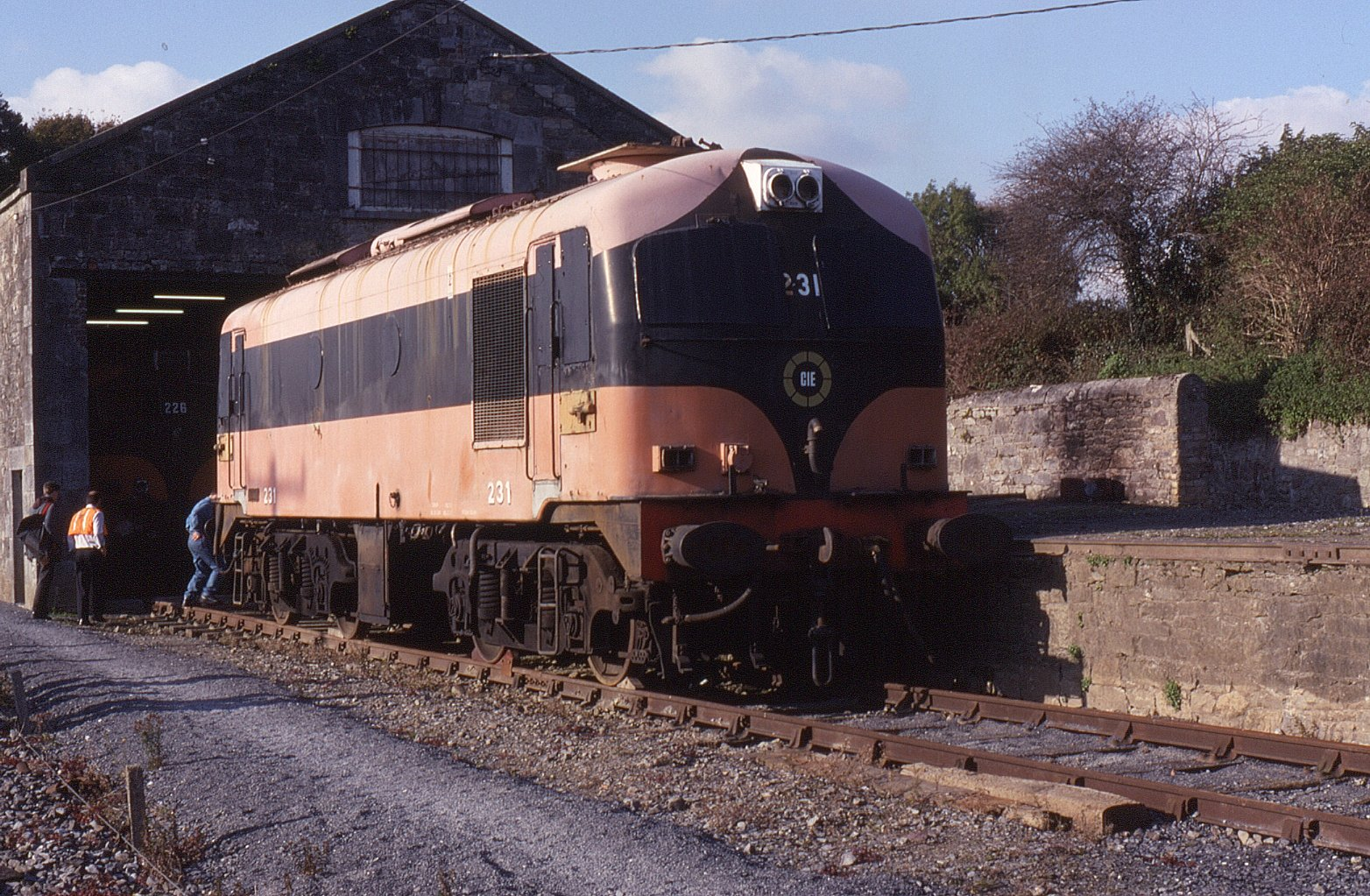
Locomotive C231 at Carrick-on-Suir prior to restoration. This engine is now at the Downpatrick and County Down Railway.

The ITG owns thirteen locomotives and one inspection trolley. It has previously owned another three locomotives. 226 was the ITG's first locomotive, arriving at its Carrick-on-Suir base on 6 December 1992.

Locomotives owned by the ITG
Loco No.	Class	Date Acquired	Current location	Current Status	Country of origin
A3R	001 (A) Class	1995	Downpatrick	Stored	England
A39R	001 (A) Class	1995	Downpatrick	Stored	England
B103	101 (B) Class	1993	Carrick-on-Suir	Stored	England
124	121 (B) Class	2009	Downpatrick	Operational	United States
146	141 (B) Class	2010	Downpatrick	Operational	United States
152	141 (B) Class	2010	Downpatrick	Stored	United States
190	181 (B) Class	2009	Downpatrick	Under restoration	United States
226	201 (C) Class	1992	Carrick-on-Suir	Under restoration	England
C231	201 (C) Class	1992	Downpatrick	Stored	England
G601	601 (G) Class	1994	Carrick-on-Suir	Stored	West Germany
G611	611 (G) Class	1994	Downpatrick	Stored	West Germany
G616	611 (G) Class	1993	Carrick-on-Suir	Under restoration	West Germany
G617	611 (G) Class	1993	Downpatrick	Operational	West Germany
712	Wickham Trolley	1997	Downpatrick	Stored	Unknown

=== Locomotives formerly owned by the ITG ===
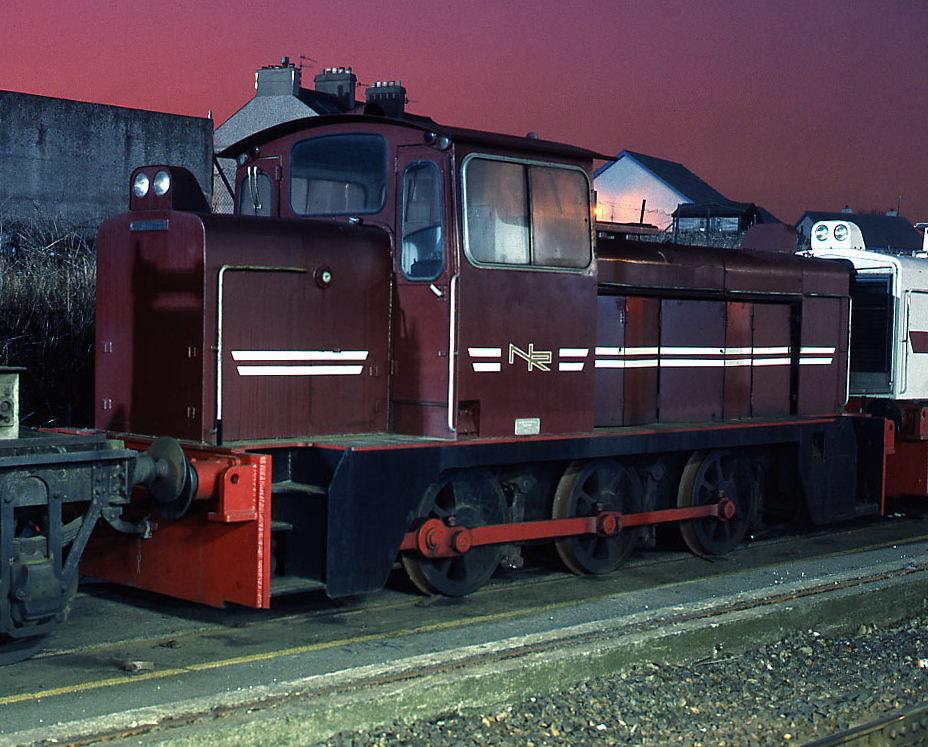
NIR No. 2, formerly preserved by the ITG.

The entire NIR 1 Class (Nos.1, 2 and 3) were purchased by the ITG in 1994. The ITG sold locomotives 2 and 3 to Beaver Power Ltd in 2005 for work in Sri Lanka, which were subsequently overhauled at Beaver's Merthyr Tydfil workshops with the work including regauging to 5' 6" and the fitting of a new diesel engine. In 2010, the ITG sold locomotive 1 to Beaver for eventual overhaul (it had been moved with 2 and 3 in 2005 for use initially as a source of spare parts) and reuse in Sri Lanka. Today, 2 is operational and carried the name 'Shakthi' at a Holcim cement plant in Puttalam province, Sri Lanka, while 1, stripped for parts during the rebuilding of the other two, remains stored at Merthyr Tydfil. After several years of operation, 3 has also been stripped for parts in Sri Lanka for the upkeep of 2.

== See also ==
- List of heritage railways in the Republic of Ireland
- Diesel locomotives of Ireland
- Downpatrick and County Down Railway
- West Clare Railway
- Railway Preservation Society of Ireland
