= CIÉ 071 Class =

Diesel–electric locomotive

Córas Iompair Éireann 071 class Northern Ireland Railways 110 class ŽS class 666
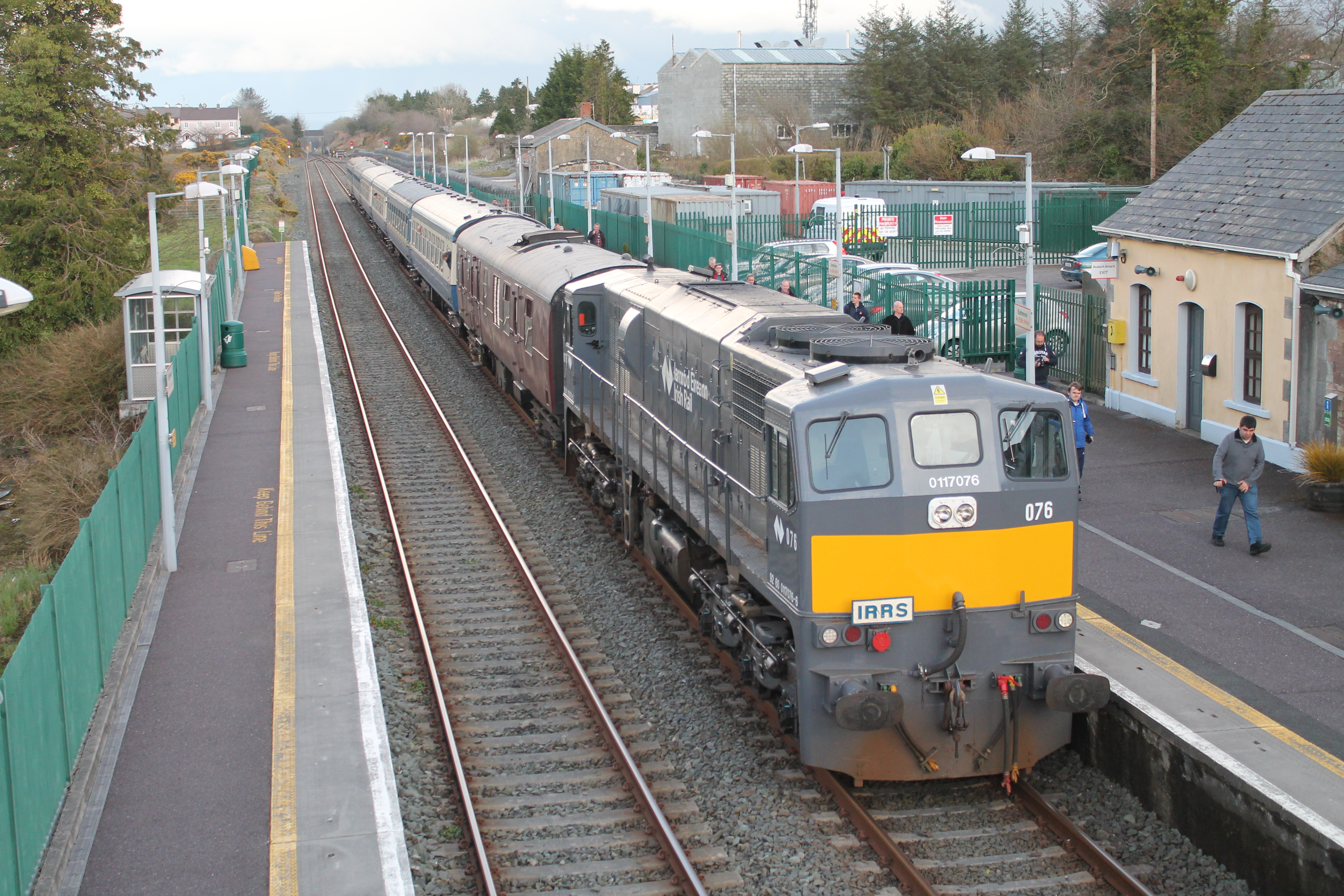
- Iarnród Éireann No. 076 in the current Irish Rail livery at Rathmore, April 2016
Type and origin
- Power type: Diesel–electric
- Builder: General Motors Electro Motive Division, La Grange, Illinois, USA
- Serial number: 713736–713753 (CIÉ 071-088); 798072-1, 798072-2 (NIR 111/112); 838084-1 (NIR 113)
- Model: JT22CW
- Build date: 1976 (CIÉ 071-088); 1978 (JŽ/ŽS); 1980 (NIR 111/112); 1984 (NIR 113)
- Total produced: 18 (CIÉ/IÉ); 3 (NIR); 4 (JŽ/ŽS/SV)
Specifications
- Configuration
  - AAR: C-C
  - UIC: Co′Co′
- Gauge: 1,600 mm (5 ft 3 in) 1,435 mm (4 ft 8 1/2 in) standard gauge (Serbia)
- Wheel diameter: 1,016 mm (40.0 in)
- Length: 17.37 m (57 ft 0 in)
- Loco weight: 99 t (97 long tons; 109 short tons)
- Prime mover: EMD 12-645E3B, later 12-645E3C
- Engine type: V12 Two-stroke diesel
- Aspiration: Turbocharger
- Generator: AR10D3
- Traction motors: D77, 6 off
- Cylinders: 12
- MU working: Within class and with CIÉ 121, 141 and 181 Classes
- Loco brake: Air
- Train brakes: Air & vacuum
Performance figures
- Maximum speed: 145 km/h (90 mph)
- Power output: 1,830 kW (2,450 hp)
- Tractive effort
  - Starting: 245 kN (55,000 lbf)
  - Continuous: 209 kN (47,000 lbf)
Career
- Operators: Iarnród Éireann; Northern Ireland Railways; Srbijavoz
- Numbers: 071–088 (IÉ); 111–113 (NIR); 001–004 (JŽ/ŽS/SV)
- Locale: Republic of Ireland; Northern Ireland; Serbia; Yugoslavia

The Córas Iompair Éireann/Iarnród Éireann 071 Class or Northern Ireland Railways 110 Class or Serbian Railways JŽ series 666 is a General Motors Electro-Motive Division EMD JT22CW series diesel–electric locomotive used in the Republic of Ireland, Northern Ireland and Serbia.

== Córas Iompair Éireann ==
In the mid-1970s the principal passenger services of Córas Iompair Éireann (CIÉ) were operated by the 001 Class, which were limited to 75 mph (121 km/h), or pairs of 141 Class and 181 Class locomotives. In order to facilitate 90 mph (140 km/h) running on the Dublin–Cork and Dublin–Belfast lines CIÉ ran a tendering process to acquire 18 higher-powered locomotives and General Motors Electro-Motive Diesel (EMD), builder of much of CIÉ's existing locomotive fleet, were chosen as the supplier. The new 071 Class were similar to CIÉ's earlier 141 Class and 191 Class locomotives, also built by EMD, with a narrow body between two full-width cabs. Compared to the older locomotives they were longer with a Co-Co wheel arrangement and had a larger turbo-charged 12-cylinder EMD 645.

The locomotives were built at EMD's factory in La Grange, Illinois, and all 18 were delivered together to Ireland by boat, arriving in Dublin on 2 November 1976. A trade union dispute, with drivers wanting extra pay for driving the faster, more powerful locomotives, resulted in a significant delay in their introduction. Their first passenger service was the 14:30 from Dublin Heuston to Cork on 23 May 1977, operated by 082. They displaced the older 001 Class from CIÉ's principal passenger services and allowed a new timetable with reduced journey times to be introduced. From 1982, after Northern Irish Railways had acquired similar locomotives, the 071 Class began operating the Enterprise service between Dublin and Belfast.

The 071 Class began to be replaced on the most important passenger services from 1994 by the new 201 Class locomotives and were moved to services from Dublin to Waterford, Rosslare and Sligo. They worked these passenger services until in the mid-2000s, when they were replaced by 22000 Class railcars. The locomotives remained in service for freight and permanent way trains.

As of 2023 all the CIÉ locomotives remained in service, being used on freight and permanent way trains. Their maximum speed has been reduced to 120 km/h (75 mph) while light engine and 80 km/h (50 mph) while operating certain freight services.

The class was originally fitted with an EMD 12-645E3B engine but was upgraded to 12-645E3C specification in 1992, along with the installation of yaw dampers to resolve issues of poor ride quality and bogie cracks at high speeds.

In 2013 an overhaul programme started the class which included an engine rebuild, refurbished bogies, bodywork repairs, sealing the cabs to prevent draughts and a new slate grey livery. As of September 2018, the entire 071 Class has been refurbished.

=== Hydrogen conversion ===
IÉ announced plans in 2023 to convert a member of the fleet to run on hydrogen with the assistance of Latvian firm DIGAS. The project will convert the locomotive's existing engine to burn hydrogen and is expected to cost around €1.5 million, part of which be funded by the European Union.

== Northern Ireland Railways ==
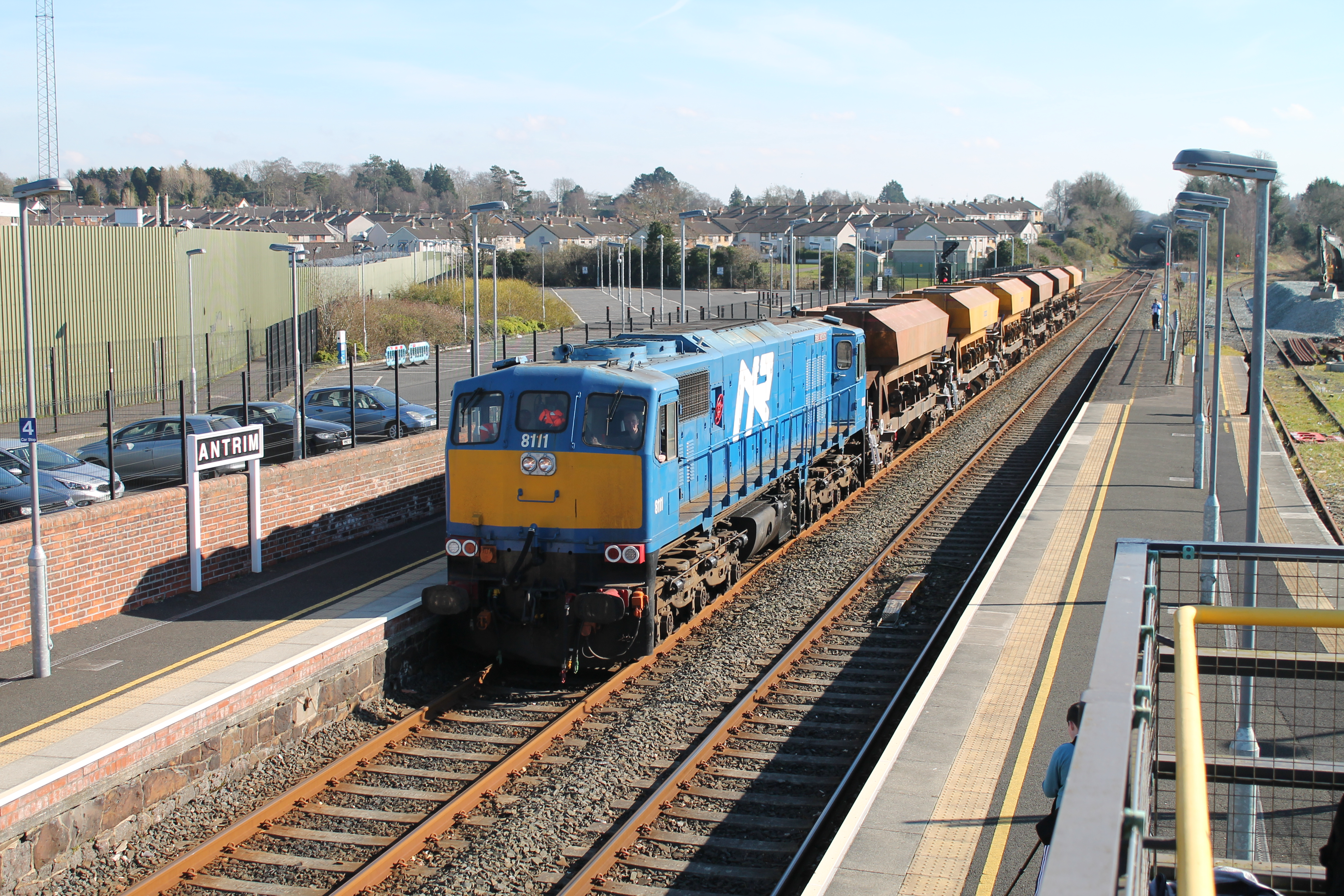
111 at Antrim station with a ballast train in 2015

The three NI Railways Class 110 (originally Class 111) locomotives are identical to CIÉ's 071 Class. The first two were delivered in December 1980 and entered service in February 1981. The third locomotive followed in 1984. The locomotives were numbered 111, 112 and 113 and named Great Northern, Northern Counties and Belfast & County Down respectively. A number 8 was later prefixed to the original numbers for NIR's computer system.

The Class 110 were initially used to replace the NIR 101 Class on the Enterprise service, hauling Mark 2 carriages bought second-hand from British Rail. Locomotive 112 was on long-term loan to Iarnród Éireann from 2003 until 2006. In 2007, it was announced that the three locomotives would be converted for push-pull operation with a DBSO driving trailer, however this never happened. The DBSO was disposed of, never having been used, and is now preserved at the Downpatrick and County Down Railway and the other ex-Gatwick Express carriages were sold to the Railway Preservation Society of Ireland (RPSI), leaving the Class 110 locomotives with no normal passenger duties. As of 2023 the locomotives no longer haul passenger trains (including for third parties like the RPSI) but remain in use for shunting, permanent way and engineering duties. Locomotives 111 and 112 were equipped for electric train supply, but as of 2005 this was no longer in use.

== IÉ/NIR locomotive names ==
All three Northern Ireland Railways locomotives are named after former railway companies whose lines make up the current NIR network. Two of the Iarnród Éireann freight locomotives are named. Details are as follows:

- IÉ 071: Great Southern and Western Railway
- IÉ 082: Cumann Na nInnealtoiri / The Institution Of Engineers Of Ireland
- NIR 111: Great Northern
- NIR 112: Northern Counties
- NIR 113: Belfast & County Down

== Liveries ==
The CIÉ locomotives were delivered in a new Supertrain livery of golden brown with a broad horizontal black band. This was later modified with brighter orange instead of golden brown and then with thin white lines either side of the black band. In 2011, after the class were no longer in use for passenger trains, a new black and silver freight livery was introduced. From 2013 this has been replaced by slate grey which includes the UIC number as well as IÉ's three-digit numbers.

The NIR locomotives are blue with a small yellow warning panel on each end.

Special liveries have been applied to two 071 Class locomotives. In 2016 locomotive 071 was repainted into the original CIÉ Supertrain livery for the 40th anniversary of the introduction of the class and in 2017 locomotive 073 was repainted into the 'white stripe' livery to mark 30 years of Iarnród Éireann. In September 2026, loco 082 was overhauled and repainted back to the original Irish Rail livery dating back to 1994 in order to celebrate the 50th anniversary of the class entering service.

== Yugoslavia and Serbia ==
ŽS series 666 locomotive

Four similar EMD JT22CW-2 locomotives were supplied to Yugoslav Railways in 1978 for use with Tito's Blue Train, designated as Class 666. These locomotives differ from the Irish units in being standard gauge rather than Irish gauge and having a full-width car-body. After the dissolution of Yugoslavia, the locomotives were transferred to Serbian Railways and used to haul freight and passenger trains. In 2015, when Serbian Railways was restructured, the Class 666 locomotives passed to the passenger train operator, Srbijavoz. As of 2017 only two locomotives (001 and 003) were in use, operating international passenger trains from Belgrade to Sofia, Bulgaria and Bar, Montenegro.

=== JŽ/ŽS/SV locomotive names ===
All four Class 666 locomotives were named:

- 666-001: Dinara
- 666-002: Kozara
- 666-003: Sutjeska
- 666-004: Neretva

== Fleet ==
Class	Number built	Number range	Operators
071 Class	18	071–088	Iarnród Éireann
Class 110	3	111–113	Northern Ireland Railways
Class 666	4	001–004	Jugoslovenske Železnice / Železnice Srbije / Srbijavoz

== Additional technical details ==
- Auxiliary Alternator: D14
- Auxiliary Generator: A-8147M1, 18 kW (24 hp)
- Power at rail: 1,300 kW (1,700 hp)
- Storage Battery: 32 cells, 420 ampere hours
- Bogies: Flexicoil
- Wheel Diameter: 1,016 mm (40.0 inches)
- Compressor/Exhauster: Model ABOV
- Height over horn: 4.04 m (13 ft 3 in)
- Width: 2.89 m (9 ft 5 3/4 in)
- Fuel Tank: 3,600 L (790 imp gal; 950 US gal)
- Min Turning Radius: 50 m (164.04 ft)
- Multiple working: To AAR, with all IÉ & NIR GM locos
- Nos. 111 and 112 were modified by NIR to provide head end power to coaching stock in the early 1990s, however this capability was seldom used and is now isolated.

== Accidents and incidents ==
- On Friday 1 August 1980, locomotive 075 was hauling a passenger train which was derailed at Buttevant, County Cork, killing eighteen and injuring 62 people.
- On 21 August 1983, locomotive 086 was hauling a passenger train which ran into the back of another passenger train near Cherryville Junction, County Kildare. Seven people were killed and 55 were injured.

== Models ==
An 00 gauge resin kit of the 071 Class was produced by Model Irish Railways (MIR) but is no longer available. Murphy Models released an 00 gauge ready-to-run model of the 071 class in 2012.

Both the 071 and 110 class have been produced for the Microsoft Train Simulator add-on, "Irish Enterprise North".

== See also ==
- List of GM-EMD locomotives
