= CIÉ 001 Class =

Class of Irish locomotive

Córas Iompair Éireann A class (later 001 class)
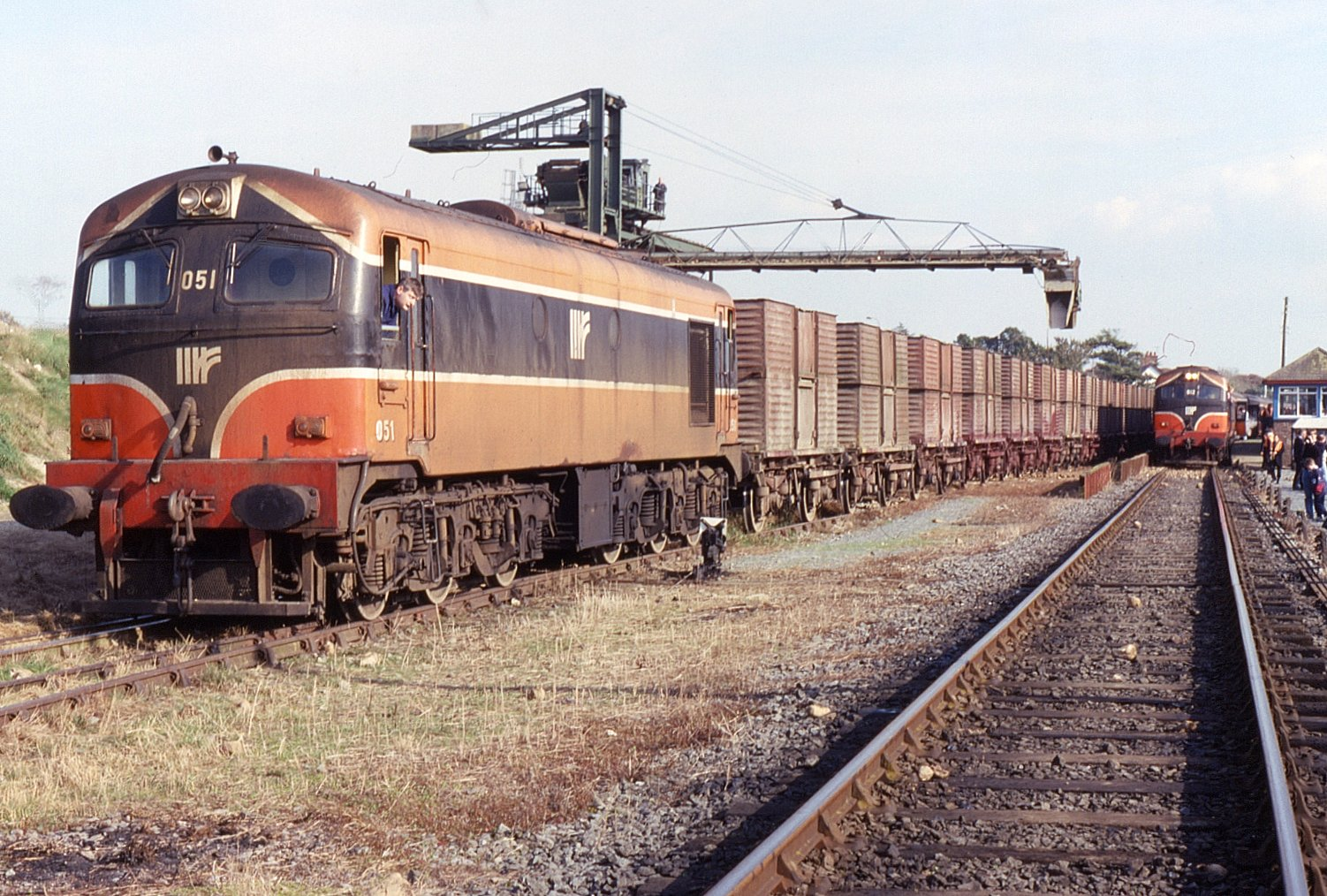
- 001 Class locomotive No. 051
Type and origin
- Power type: Diesel–electric
- Builder: Metropolitan-Vickers, Dukinfield Works, Manchester
- Build date: 1954–1956
- Total produced: 60
Specifications
- Configuration
  - UIC: Co′Co′
  - Commonwealth: Co-Co
- Gauge: 1,600 mm (5 ft 3 in)
- Length: 15.55 m (51 ft 0 in)
- Width: 2.692 m (8 ft 10.0 in)
- Height: 3.835 m (12 ft 7.0 in)
- Loco weight: 82 tonnes (81 long tons; 90 short tons)
- Prime mover: Crossley HSTV8; Re-engined 1968–1971 with EMD 12-645E
- Generator: DC generator
- Traction motors: Metropolitan Vickers MV137CW/K, 6 off DC traction motors
- Transmission: Diesel electric
- Loco brake: Vacuum
- Train brakes: Vacuum
Performance figures
- Maximum speed: 120 km/h (75 mph)
- Power output: Crossley HSTV8: 1,200 hp (890 kW) at 625 rpm EMD 12-645E: 1,325 hp (988 kW) at 830 rpm EMD 12-645E: 1,650 hp (1,230 kW) at 900 rpm (Nos. 027, 036, 046, 054 & 059. All later de-rated to 1325 hp)
- Tractive effort: 275 kN (62,000 lbf) starting, 77 kN (17,000 lbf) continuous at 35 km/h (22 mph)
Career
- Operators: Córas Iompair Éireann; Iarnród Éireann
- Class: A, later 001
- Numbers: A1–A60, later 001–060
- Withdrawn: 1973–1995
- Disposition: Four preserved, remainder scrapped

The Córas Iompair Éireann 001 Class locomotive was manufactured by Metropolitan-Vickers at their Dukinfield Works in Manchester. The 001 Class locomotive was the backbone of mainline passenger and freight train services on the Irish railway network for forty years from 1955 until the mid-1990s when they were replaced by the new 201 Class.

== History ==
Viewing dieselisation as a way of bringing operations into profitability, CIÉ placed an order for 94 diesel locomotives to be built by a British consortium on 5 May 1954: sixty being the 'A' class (later 001 Class), and the remainder being smaller 'C' class locomotives for branch line work. With components from Metropolitan Cammell, the English Steel Corporation, Crossley Brothers and Metropolitan-Vickers, the first unit would be delivered to Inchicore in July 1954.

The first of the class to enter service was A3, which entered service on 27 September 1955. The Crossley engines soon proved to be unreliable, and CIÉ would seek to replace them with engines from the Electro-Motive Division of General Motors. GM reluctantly agreed to supply 2 engines as a trial in 1967.

Trials over 1968 would prove to be a success and the entire class would be re-engined over the following years. Relegated to secondary duties after the introduction of the 071 Class, the class would be withdrawn following the delivery of the 201 Class, with the last unit withdrawn on 5 April 1995, and a 'farewell' railtour hauled by 039 occurring on 23 September 1995.

== Engines ==
=== Crossley ===
Initially they were fitted with eight-cylinder two-stroke, port-controlled Crossley engines. These were a loop scavenge type, which utilised a patented principle that recycled the normally wasted exhaust-pressure pulse to boost charge air in the cylinder. They produced 890 kW (1,200 hp) at 625 rpm and could do 120 km/h (75 mph). The original sandboxes, which were used to improve traction with the rail, were removed after a few years.

Their Crossley engines proved to be notoriously unreliable from the start. Amongst a plethora of problems were:

- Unbalanced engines resulting in vibration-induced fuel pipe and water pipe fractures
- Cylinder defects
- Excessive water temperature causing shutdowns

There were also problems with generator and motor flashovers.

Similar problems were also encountered on the Crossley-engined Western Australian Government Railways X Class and British Rail Class 28 locomotives.

=== EMD ===
These problems were tackled between 1968 and 1971 through the progressive re-engining of the entire class with a 1,650 horsepower (1,230 kW) 12-cylinder EMD 645E engine (a similar process was implemented for the original 201 Class). However, this power output stressed the ability of the original cooling and transmission systems and the engine output was reduced to 1,325 horsepower (988 kW) for improved reliability. When built, these locomotives were originally numbered A1 to A60, and as locomotives were re-engined, they had the suffix 'R' added to their number. From 1972, the prefix letters were dropped and the locomotives were renumbered 001 to 060.

== Accidents and incidents ==
- On 5 December 1963, locomotive A17 was hauling a passenger train from Westland Row to Westport when it broke down at Mullingar, County Westmeath. Locomotive A42 was sent to its assistance, but collided with the stationary train at a speed of 30 to 40 miles per hour (48 to 64 km/h). Both locomotives were damaged, 16 people were injured.
- On 23 October 1973, 008 suffered bomb damage at Meigh.
- On 20 December 1978, 010 collided with three NIR vehicles at Lisburn.
- On 21 April 1979, 046 suffered bomb damage at Killeen Bridge (near Newtowncloghoge).
- On 23 July 1979, 004 was hijacked, derailed and burnt out at Goraghwood.
- On 12 March 1983, 032 sustained damage after running away in Cork Yard.
- On 2 June 1988, 040 sustained damage in a shunting accident at Heuston station.

== Preservation ==
Four A class locomotives survived into preservation, the details of which are outlined in the table below:

Number	Owner	Location	Operational	Livery
A3_{R}	Irish Traction Group	Downpatrick	No	Black and Tan (Low bands)
A15	West Clare Railway	Moyasta	No	Unlined green
A39_{R}	Irish Traction Group	Downpatrick	No	Black and Tan (High bands)
A55	Castlerea Railway Museum	Castlerea	No	Lined green

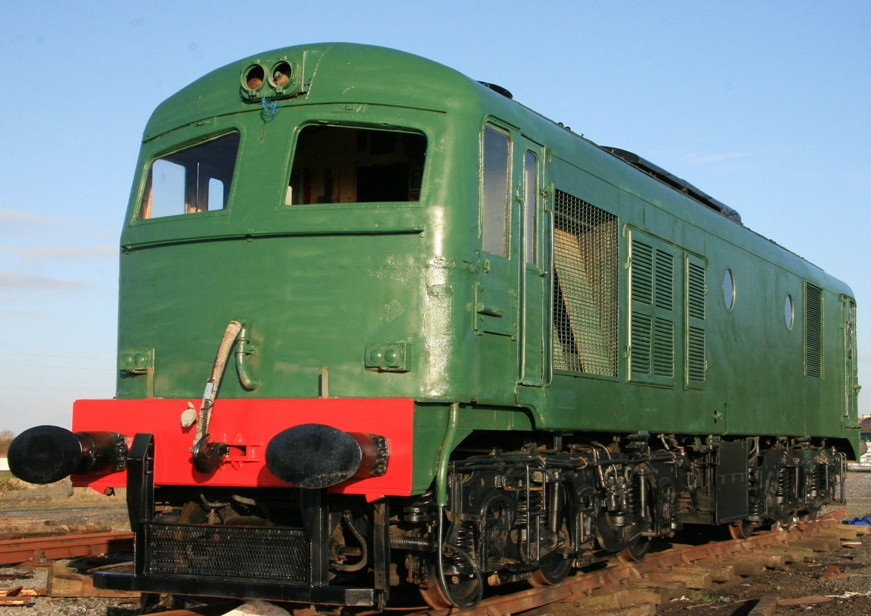
A15

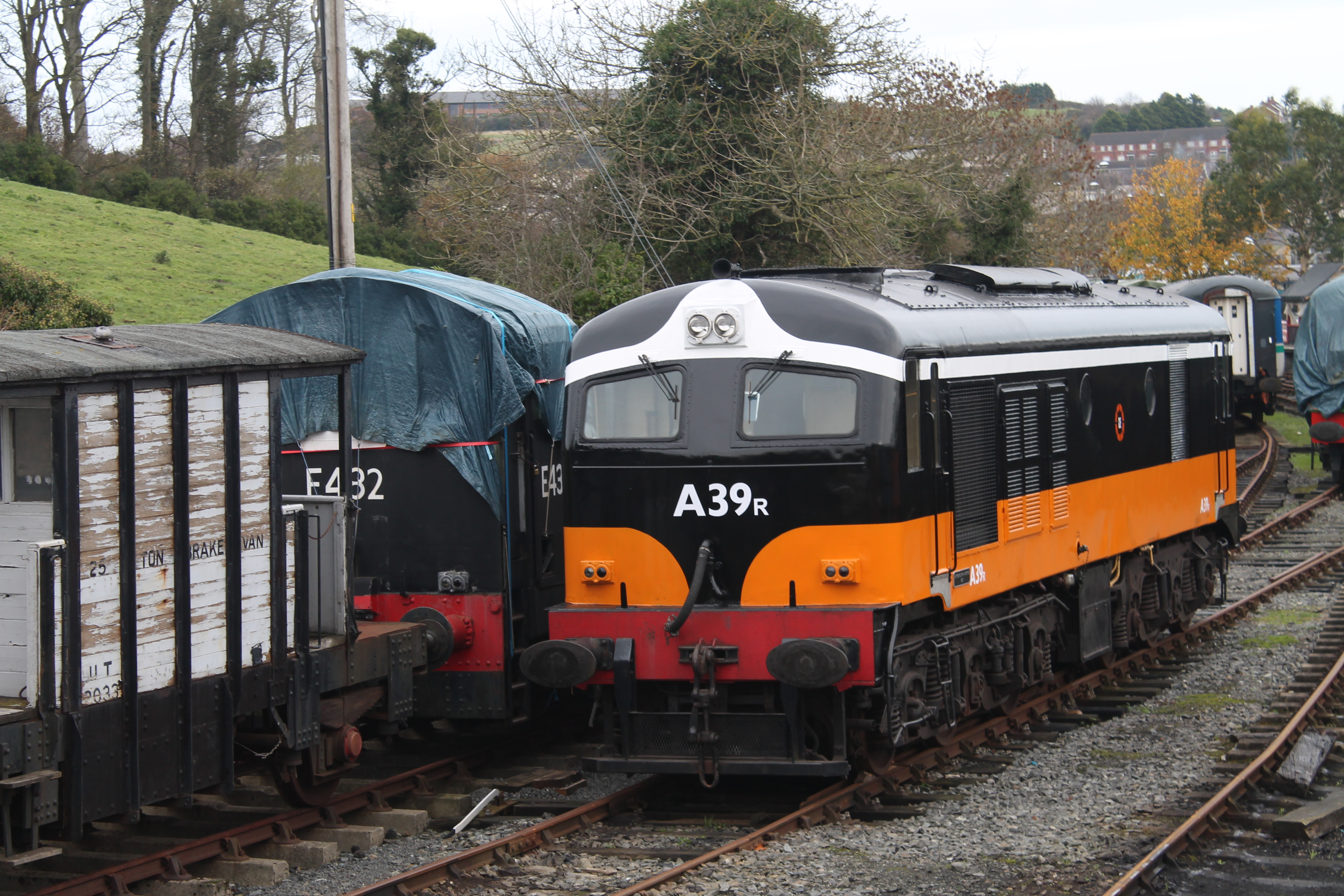
A39_{R}

== Model ==
The A Class is available as a 4mm scale (OO) ready-to-run (RTR) model from Irish Railway Models. Announced in October 2018, it was released in October 2021. In the past it has been made as a 00 gauge kit by Silver Fox Models.
