= CIÉ 141 Class =

Railway locomotive

Córas Iompair Éireann 141 class
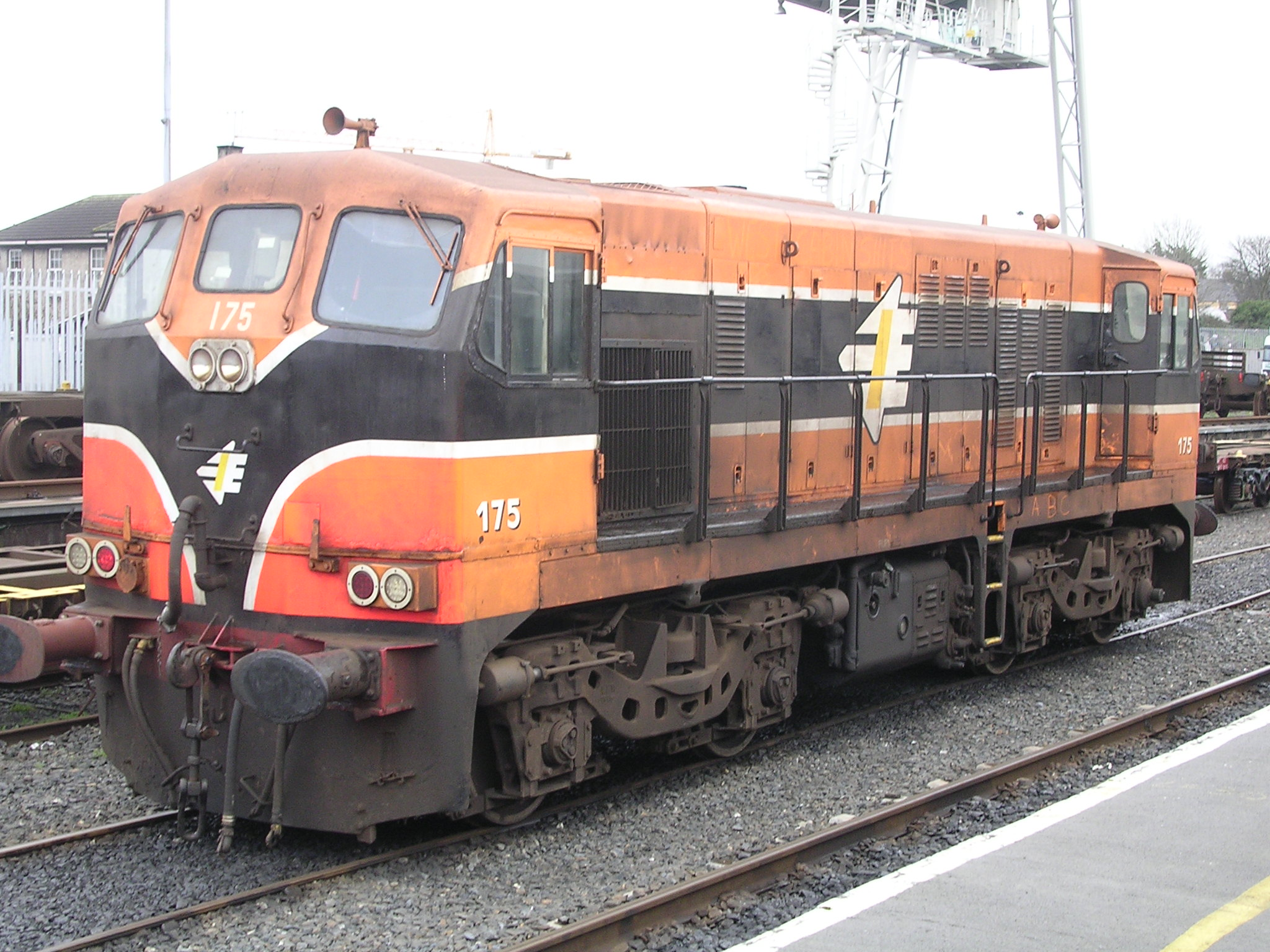
- Iarnród Éireann 175 at Colbert station, Limerick, 2006
Type and origin
- Power type: Diesel–electric
- Builder: General Motors Electro Motive Division, La Grange, Illinois, USA
- Order number: 700438–700474
- Serial number: 27467–57503
- Model: JL8
- Build date: 1962
- Total produced: 37
Specifications
- Configuration
  - AAR: B-B
  - UIC: Bo′Bo′
- Gauge: 5 ft 3 in (1,600 mm)
- Wheel diameter: 40 in (1,016 mm)
- Length: 13.42 m (44 ft 0 in)
- Loco weight: 67 tonnes (66 long tons; 74 short tons)
- Prime mover: EMD 8-567CR
- Engine type: 8-cylinder Two-stroke diesel
- Aspiration: Roots-type supercharger
- Traction motors: Axle-hung, nose-suspended, 4 off
- Cylinders: 8
- Transmission: D25 DC generator DC traction motors
- Train brakes: Air & Vacuum
Performance figures
- Maximum speed: 123 km/h (76 mph)
- Power output: 960 hp (720 kW)
- Tractive effort: 197 kN (44,000 lbf) starting
Career
- Operators: Córas Iompair Éireann; Iarnród Éireann
- Class: 141 class
- Numbers: B141–B177 (later 141–177)
- Withdrawn: 1993–2011
- Disposition: 8 preserved, 29 scrapped

The CIE 141 Class locomotives were built in 1962 by General Motors Electro Motive Division (EMD) in the United States. Numbered B141 to B177, they were an updated version of the 121 Class locomotives, mechanically very similar but with cabs at each end.

They are EMD model JL8 (J = Double Ended Cabs, L = Lightweight Frame, 8= 8-cylinder 567 engine) and although originally fitted with an EMD 8-567CR engine of 960 horsepower (720 kW), all were later fitted with 645 type "power packs" (piston & liner assemblies) for parts standardisation. The original power output was kept for reliability reasons. They weighed 67 tonnes and had a maximum speed of 123 km/h (76 mph).

Many of these locomotives were later rebuilt with a GM 8-645E engine of 1,100 horsepower (820 kW) (as used in the re-engined Class C locomotives), though some have since had the original engine refitted. The locomotives were delivered in the CIE livery of brown/black/white.

== Service ==
Following crew training trials between Inchicore and Monasterevin (passenger trains), Kildare (goods trains), and Hazelhatch (light engines), the class appeared on main line trials from Amiens Street (Connolly) to Drogheda, and Westland Row (Pearse) to Arklow on Tuesday 4 December 1962, entering traffic on the Dublin to Cork main line four days later. The locomotives were fitted for multiple working and double-headed the 10:40 Dublin to Cork train and the return Cork to Dublin at 15:30. These were the heaviest trains at that time. From Monday 10 December 1962 one locomotive was allocated to the Dublin–Belfast Enterprise service.

In later years, regular passenger duties included trains on the Rosslare to Waterford/Limerick lines, until they were superseded by railcars on these duties.

The remaining locomotives, nos. 142, 144, 146, 147, 152, 162, 171, 175 and 177, were withdrawn in February 2010. However, 171 was reinstated for a short time and was confined to pilot duties in the Dublin area.

== Accidents and incidents ==
- On Tuesday 13 August 1974, locomotive B176 was hauling a passenger train when it was involved in a head-on collision with locomotive B192, which was also hauling a passenger train, at Rosslare Strand. Fifteen people were injured.
- On Friday 5 May 1995, locomotive 165 left Cork Kent railway station at roughly 06:30, ferrying an empty train into Cobh. The train failed to stop and continued through the wall of the adjacent Cobh Heritage Centre. There were no injuries incurred by any of the four personnel on board, the driver narrowly escaping injury as a roof beam penetrated the right side cab window. The carriages were later removed and services resumed from the station that day.

== Preservation ==
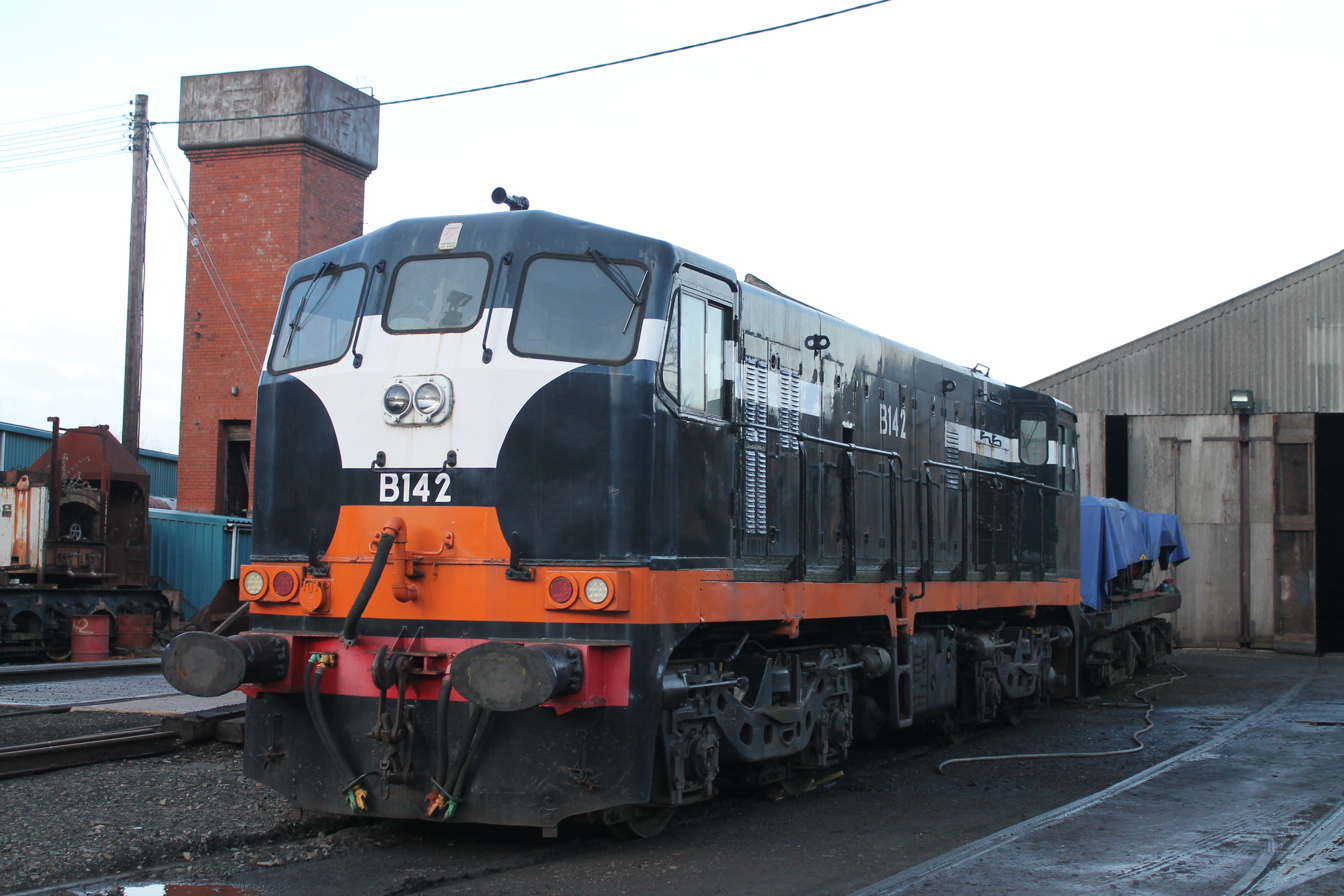
B142, Whitehead

=== Railway Preservation Society of Ireland ===
The first of the 141 class locomotives to enter preservation was class leader 141, which was purchased by the Railway Preservation Society of Ireland with sponsorship from Murphy Models in February 2010. The sale of the locomotive was assisted by Phil Verster, the CME of Iarnród Éireann. As part of the sale, the locomotive received a repaint into its original Black & Tan livery as B141 at Inchicore workshops, where it was held in store.

Later in February 2010, locomotive 142 was purchased privately by a member of the RPSI and given to the Society. This locomotive was also repainted into its original Black & Tan livery as B142 at Inchicore, and ran an enthusiasts' special on Wednesday 24 February 2010 with B141. Following this the locomotive was moved to the RPSI's site at Whitehead, where it saw regular service as a yard shunter. Bodywork repairs, including cab floors and sides were completed in 2020/21, a full engine rebuild during 2021/22 after failure due to cylinder liner o-ring failure, and full repaint to original livery in 2023.

In January 2011, the RPSI newsletter Five Foot Three announced that the RPSI had approached IÉ with the intentions of purchasing a third 141 class locomotive. At the time IÉ had three locomotives - numbers 162, 171, and 175 - still in service and agreed to make the best of the three locomotives available for preservation. Accordingly, locomotive 175 was selected for future preservation. In 2014 the locomotive was bought by the RPSI.

In July 2016, the two stored GM 141 locomotives owned by RPSI (B141 & 175) were brought out of the sidings in Inchicore, and moved to RPSI's shed at Connolly station for storage. The move happened on Tuesday 19 July, hauled by 071. Assessment of their condition took place afterwards and restoration to mainline running is planned. 175 was originally earmarked as a source of spares for B141, B142 and 121-class B134, but it may also be refurbished.

In April 2026, the three stored GM 141 locomotives owned by RPSI (147, 171 & 177) were brought out of the sidings in Inchicore, and moved to RPSI's shed at Connolly station for storage.

=== Irish Traction Group ===
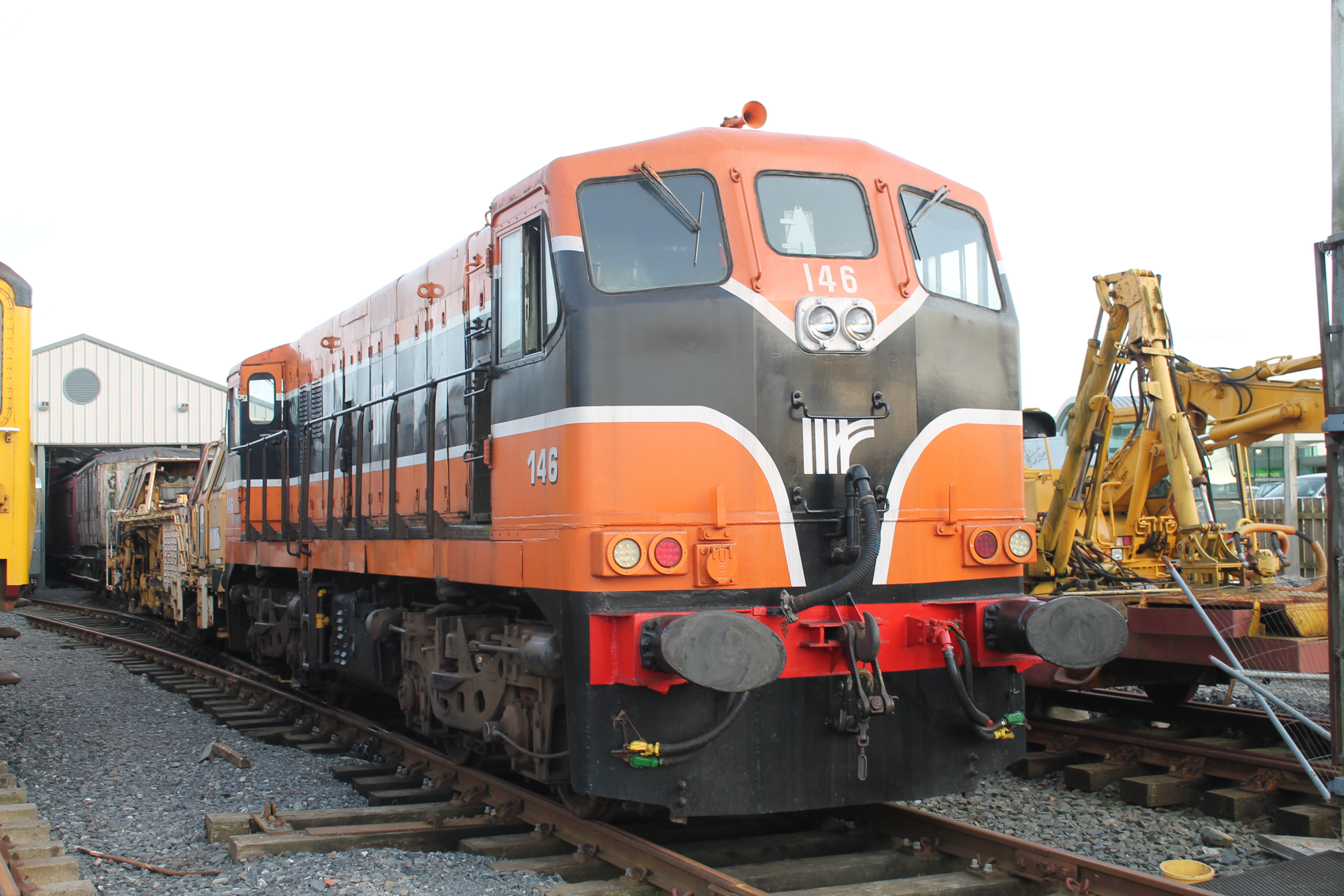
146, Downpatrick

The Irish Traction Group (ITG) purchased locomotive 146 in May 2010. This locomotive, withdrawn in March 2010, remained in storage at Inchicore until November of that year, when it was transported by Allelys to the Downpatrick and County Down Railway. The locomotive is in active service and is a useful member of the D&CDR fleet. Later in November 2010, the ITG purchased locomotive 152. This locomotive had been employed on work trains in the Mayo area until withdrawn in February 2010 following a brake failure at Ballyhaunis. Although repairs were started by IÉ, work was stopped after some preliminary dismantling work had been carried out in both cabs. It was sold as a source of spare parts for 124, 146, and 190. It was in storage at Moyasta Junction on the West Clare Railway until June 2025, when it was moved by road to the Downpatrick and County Down Railway.

=== Preservation status ===
| Number | Owner | Status | Livery | Notes |
|---|---|---|---|---|
| B141 | RPSI | Stored, serviceable | Black & Tan (1962) | Inchicore Works Dublin |
| B142 | RPSI | In traffic, currently used as a shunter | Black & Tan (1962) | Whitehead |
| 146 | ITG | In traffic | IR (1987) | DCDR, Downpatrick |
| 147 | RPSI | Stored | IE (1994) | Connolly Shed - stored (originally bought as a spares source) |
| 152 | ITG | Stored | IE (1994) | DCDR, Downpatrick |
| 171 | RPSI | Stored | IE (1994) | Connolly Shed - stored (originally bought as a spares source) |
| 175 | RPSI | Stored | IE (1994) | Connolly Shed - stored (originally bought as a spares source) |
| 177 | RPSI | Stored | IE (1994) | Connolly Shed - stored (originally bought as a spares source) |

645 Engine Re-fitted: B142, 145, 149, 151, 154, 157, 163, 167, 170, 172 and 175.

567 Engine fitted: B141, 143, 144, 146, 147, 148, 150, 152, 153, 155, 156, 158, 159, 160, 161, 162, 164, 165, 166, 168, 169, 171, 173, 174, 176 and 177.

== In fiction ==
- Class members 164 and 172 appear in the 1992 Irish fantasy family adventure Into the West.
- Class member 151 appears in the Walt Disney Productions film The Secret of Boyne Castle

== Model ==
- Murphy Models have produced via Bachmann a comprehensive range of '00' gauge 141 Class models. All liveries are covered (Black & Tan, CIE Golden Brown, Irish Rail and Iarnród Éireann) and with correct detailing for each era (e.g. LED pilot lights on the later versions). These models were first released in early 2008.
- A Rapid Prototyped 141 N Scale body is available from Valve Design.
- The 141 class along with many other locomotives and rolling stock has been made into a drivable locomotive for the game openbve by Celtic trainsim.

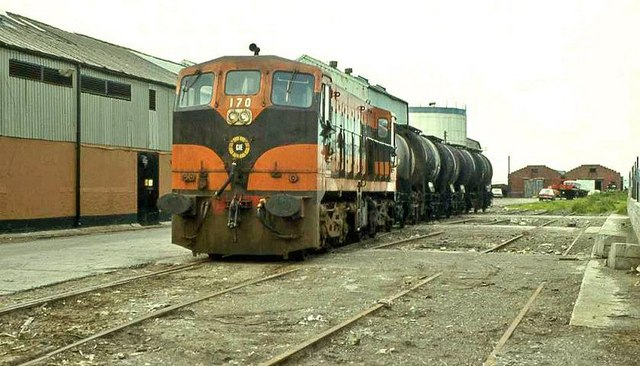
Sligo Quay working in 1983
