= CIÉ 181 Class =

Córas Iompair Éireann 181 class
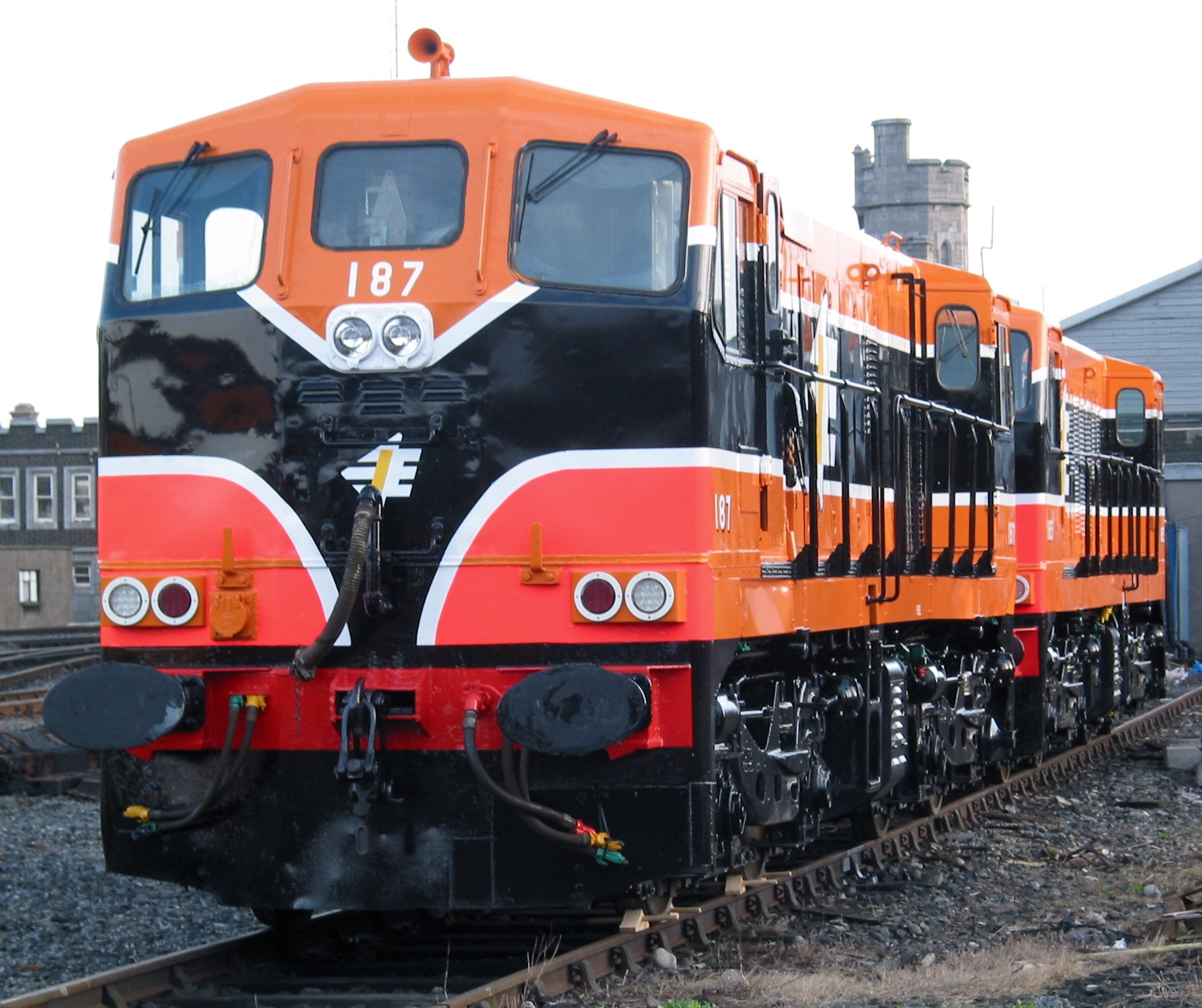
- 187 at Inchicore, 2002
Type and origin
- Power type: Diesel–electric
- Builder: General Motors Electro Motive Division, La Grange, Illinois, USA
- Order number: 710408–710419
- Serial number: 31248–31259
- Model: JL18
- Build date: 1966
- Total produced: 12
Specifications
- Configuration
  - UIC: Bo′Bo′
  - Commonwealth: Bo-Bo
- Gauge: 5 ft 3 in (1,600 mm)
- Wheel diameter: 40 in (1,016 mm)
- Length: 13.42 m (44 ft 0 in)
- Loco weight: 67 tonnes (66 long tons; 74 short tons)
- Fuel type: Diesel
- Fuel capacity: 500 Gallons (1890 litres)
- Prime mover: EMD 645E
- Engine type: Two-stroke diesel
- Generator: D25 DC generator
- Traction motors: Axle-hung, nose-suspended, 4 off
- Cylinders: 8
- Transmission: Electric
- Train brakes: Air & Vacuum
- Couplers: Buffers and chain coupler
Performance figures
- Maximum speed: 143 km/h (89 mph)
- Power output: 1,100 hp (820 kW)
- Tractive effort: 170 kN (38,000 lbf) starting, 119 kN (27,000 lbf) continuous at 18 km/h (11 mph)
Career
- Operators: Córas Iompair Éireann; Iarnród Éireann
- Numbers: B181–B192 (later 181–192)
- Nicknames: "Baby GM", "Small GM", "Bo-Bos"
- Last run: 7th November 2009
- Withdrawn: 1991–2009
- Disposition: One preserved (190), remainder scrapped

The Córas Iompair Éireann 181 Class locomotives were built in 1966 by General Motors Electro-Motive Division (EMD) and numbered B181 to B192.

== Overview ==
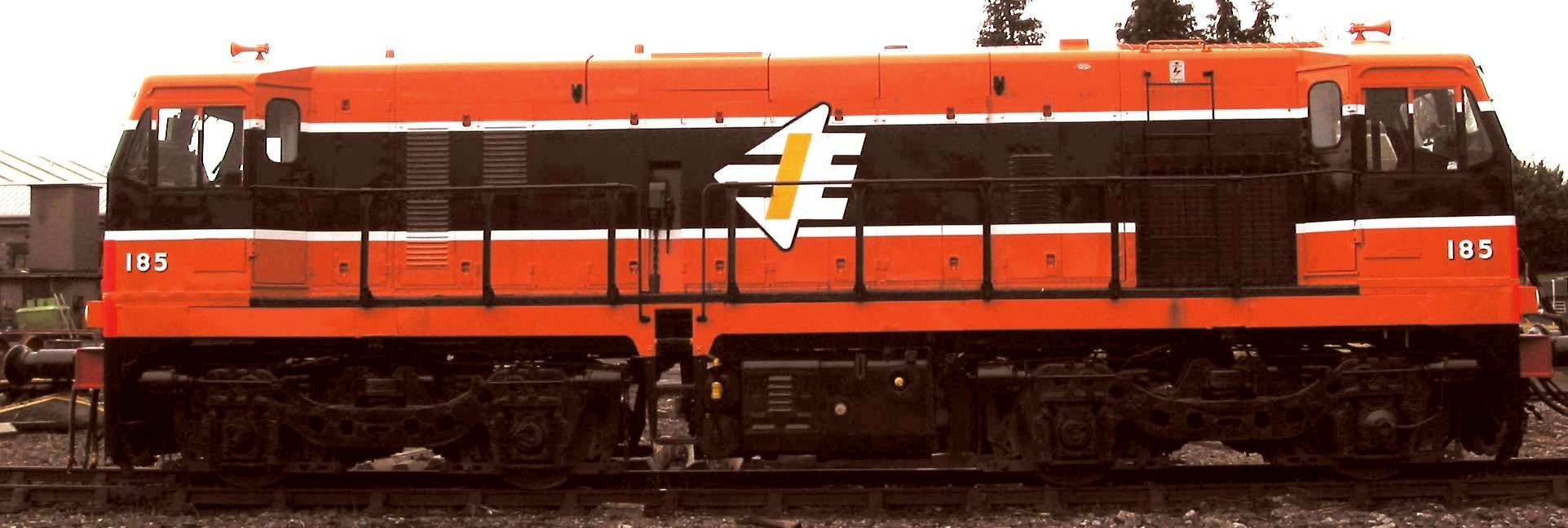
Loco 185 at Inchicore, 2002

These locomotives were virtually identical to the earlier 141 Class locomotives, but fitted with the more powerful 645 engine and thermostatically controlled engine cooling fan and inlet shutters. Delivery took place in 1966, with introduction into service happening a short time later.

They were fitted with an EMD 8-645E engine of 1100 hp, weighed 67 tonnes (66 long tons; 74 short tons), and had a maximum design speed of 143 km/h (89 mph) which was restricted to 120 km/h (75 mph) in service. Number 186 was later fitted with an EMD 8-567CR engine of 960 hp (720 kW), as used in the 141 Class locomotives.

== Withdrawal and preservation ==
All of the 181 class have been withdrawn, the first being 191 in 1991 after a runaway incident at Clonsilla; it was later scrapped in 1998. In their final days they were only used on permanent way trains or as pilots. The last of the class to be withdrawn was 190 in November 2009, which spent its last days in service as the Inchicore works pilot engine before being immediately acquired for preservation by the Irish Traction Group. The locomotive was moved to Moyasta Junction on West Clare Railway for storage, where it would remain for 16 years. On 31 May 2025, 190 was moved by road to Downpatrick railway station on the Downpatrick and County Down Railway, arriving there the following day.

On 29 August 2026, 190 (in multiple with 141 Class No. 146) operated the first passenger working of the class in preservation at that year's joint DCDR-ITG diesel gala.

== Accidents and incidents ==
- On Tuesday 13 August 1974, locomotive B192 was hauling a passenger train when it was involved in a head-on collision with locomotive B176, which was also hauling a passenger train, at Rosslare Strand. Fifteen people were injured.

== Model ==
Murphy Models of Dublin commissioned Bachmann to produce an OO gauge model of these locomotives. This model first was released in December 2007. It has been supplied in all four main liveries worn by the class.
