= CIÉ 201 Class =

Diesel-electric locomotive

Córas Iompair Éireann C Class (later 201 Class)
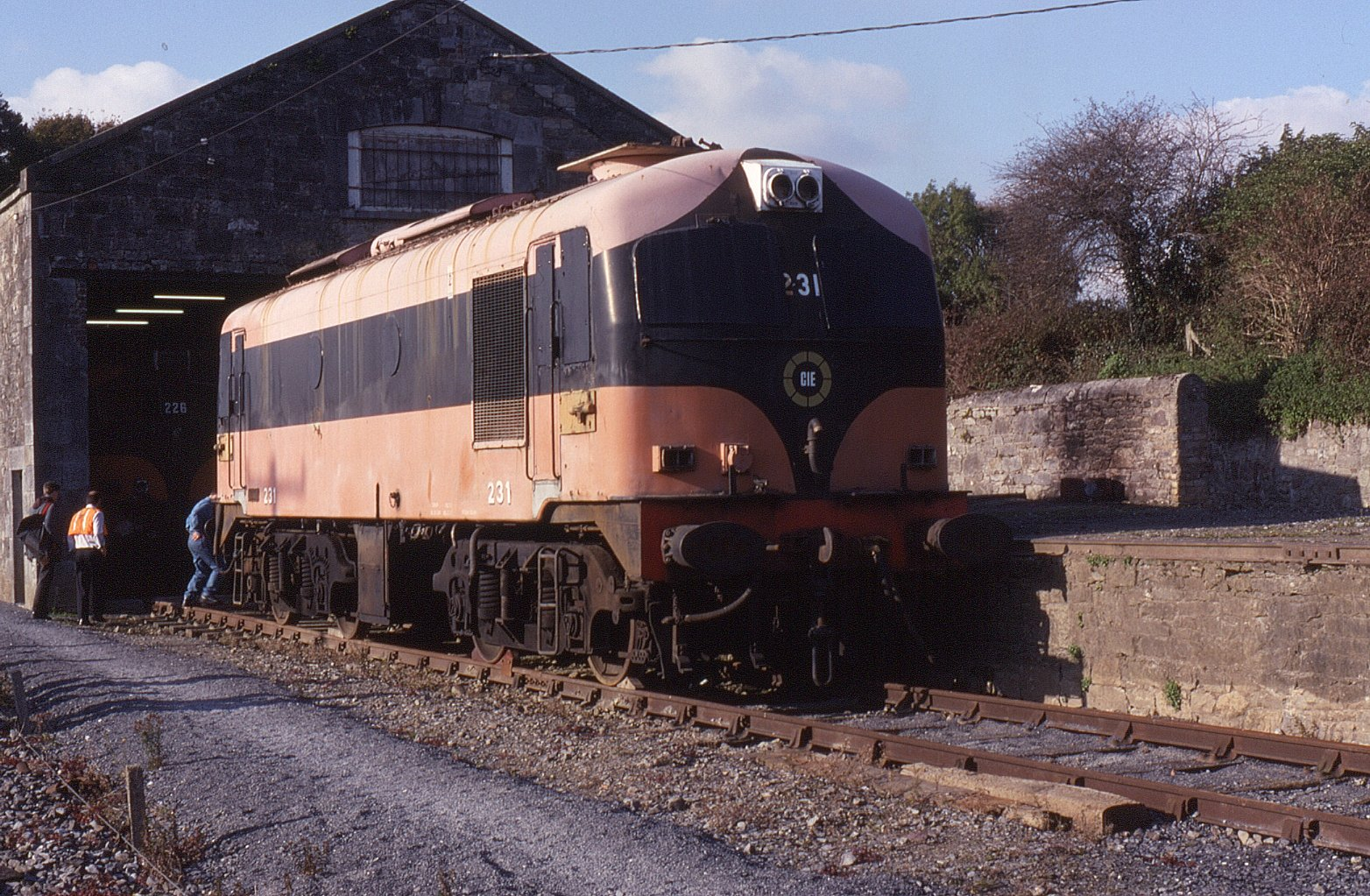
Type and origin
- Power type: Diesel–electric
- Builder: Metropolitan-Vickers, Dukinfield Works, Manchester
- Serial number: 947–980
- Build date: 1956–1957
- Total produced: 34
Specifications
- Configuration
  - UIC: Bo′Bo′
- Gauge: 1,600 mm (5 ft 3 in)
- Wheel diameter: 965 mm (3 ft 2.0 in)
- Length
  - Over buffers: 12.8 m (42 ft 0 in)
- Width: 2.692 m (8 ft 10.0 in)
- Height: 3.835 m (12 ft 7.0 in)
- Loco weight: 61.5 t (60.5 long tons; 67.8 short tons)
- Fuel capacity: 300 imp gal (1,400 L; 360 US gal)
- Prime mover: Crossley ESTV8; Re-engined with EMD 645E
- Generator: DC
- Traction motors: Metropolitan Vickers MV137CW
- Cylinders: 8
- Train brakes: Vacuum brake and air
Performance figures
- Maximum speed: 80 mph (130 km/h)
- Power output: Crossley: 410 kW (550 hp); EMD: 820 kW (1,100 hp)
- Tractive effort: 153 kN (34,000 lbf) (max)
Career
- Operators: Córas Iompair Éireann; Iarnród Éireann; Northern Ireland Railways
- Class: CIÉ C; later CIÉ 201; NIR 104
- Numbers: CIÉ: 201–234; NIR: 104–109
- Withdrawn: CIÉ: 1973–1986; NIR: 1987–1995
- Disposition: Two preserved, remainder scrapped

The Córas Iompair Éireann 201 Class or C Class was a series of 34 diesel-electric locomotives manufactured by Metropolitan-Vickers at their Dukinfield Works in Manchester. They were a smaller, lighter and less powerful version of the 001 Class and were originally intended for branch line passenger and freight (mixed traffic) duties. They were introduced in 1956 and, although their duties changed over the years, were in regular service on the Irish railway network until the mid-1980s. Six were sold to Northern Ireland Railways (NIR) in 1986.

== History ==
Unfortunately, these locomotives suffered from two distinct problems:

- During the late 1950s and early 1960s, following the publication of the Andrews Report (mimicking the widescale Beeching cuts in Britain), CIÉ undertook large-scale closures of branch lines, leaving the engines without a purpose.
- The locomotives were of insufficient power for their duties and their Crossley engines suffered reliability problems.

=== Replacement engines ===
Because of the problems with the Crossley engines attempts were made to fit the locomotives with more suitable equipment. Between 1965 and 1980, Maybach MD650 engines of 980 horsepower (730 kW) were fitted in Nos. 233 and 234. From 1969, however, a permanent solution was found by fitting the entire class with General Motors engines, in a similar process to that previously undergone by the 001 Class. The existing Metro-Vick traction motors and generators were recognised as robust and retained in the rebuild.

=== Push-pull services ===
From the early 1970s the class were given new duties, being partnered with former 2600 class diesel multiple units converted to push-pull carriage rakes to operate the suburban services around Dublin. In 1984 the Dublin suburban lines over which they worked were electrified as the Dublin Area Rapid Transit (DART) system and operated by the new 8100 Class electric multiple units.

=== Withdrawal ===
The first member of the class to be withdrawn was No. B201, being bomb damaged in 1973. The remaining members of the class, except for the six sold to NIR, were withdrawn over the two years following the opening of the DART system, having completed 30 years service for their operators.

== Numbering ==
When built, the locomotives were numbered C201–C234. As locomotives were re-engined they were renumbered B201–B234 to reflect their increased power. The prefix letter was later dropped.

== Livery ==
Over the years the class has carried six different liveries. When introduced they were painted an all-over silver-grey livery which unfortunately dirtied quickly. This was followed by all-over CIÉ green livery with a thin lighter green band on the lower panels. In the next change black became the base colour with just a white relief around the top panel, which opened to a squared-off 'V' between the cab windows. Some locomotives received large yellow panels on the cab fronts to aid visibility. With the adoption of CIÉ's "black and tan" scheme in the mid-1960s, the locomotives received this livery with a white line at roof level to match the coaches. The last CIÉ livery was golden brown with a very broad black band covering the upper panels at the level of, and as wide as, the cab windows. Those locomotives sold to NIR carried their blue livery.

== Northern Ireland Railways ==
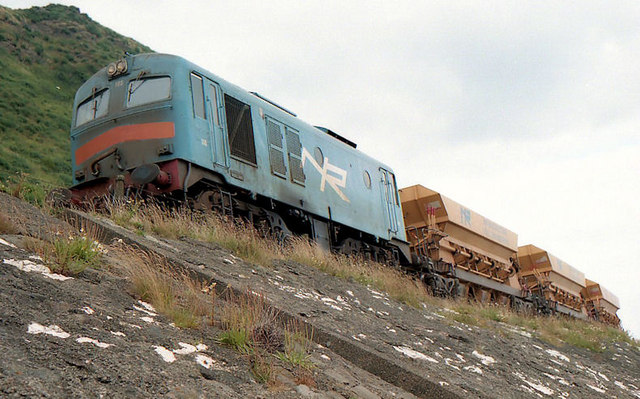
Northern Ireland Railways No. 105 near Whitehead in 1993

Six locomotives were sold to Northern Ireland Railways (NIR) in 1986. The locomotives involved were CIÉ 216, 218, 227, 228, 230 and 234 which were renumbered by NIR as 104–109 and designated 104 Class. Originally, CIÉ 224 was intended to become 105, but it was rejected by NIR and replaced by 218. 224 was left stored with NIR until it was scrapped in January 1996.

Of those that entered service, some had very short lives working for their new owners. They were stored as soon as any problems arose (e.g. a seized engine or traction motor), and the whole class was formally withdrawn between 1993 and 1995.

== Accidents and incidents ==
On 21 October 1974, locomotive B202 was hauling an empty passenger train when it ran away driverless from Connolly station and collided with a passenger train at Gormanston, County Meath, A third passenger train, hauled by locomotive B219 was struck by the wrecked trains. Two people were killed and 29 were injured.

== Preservation ==
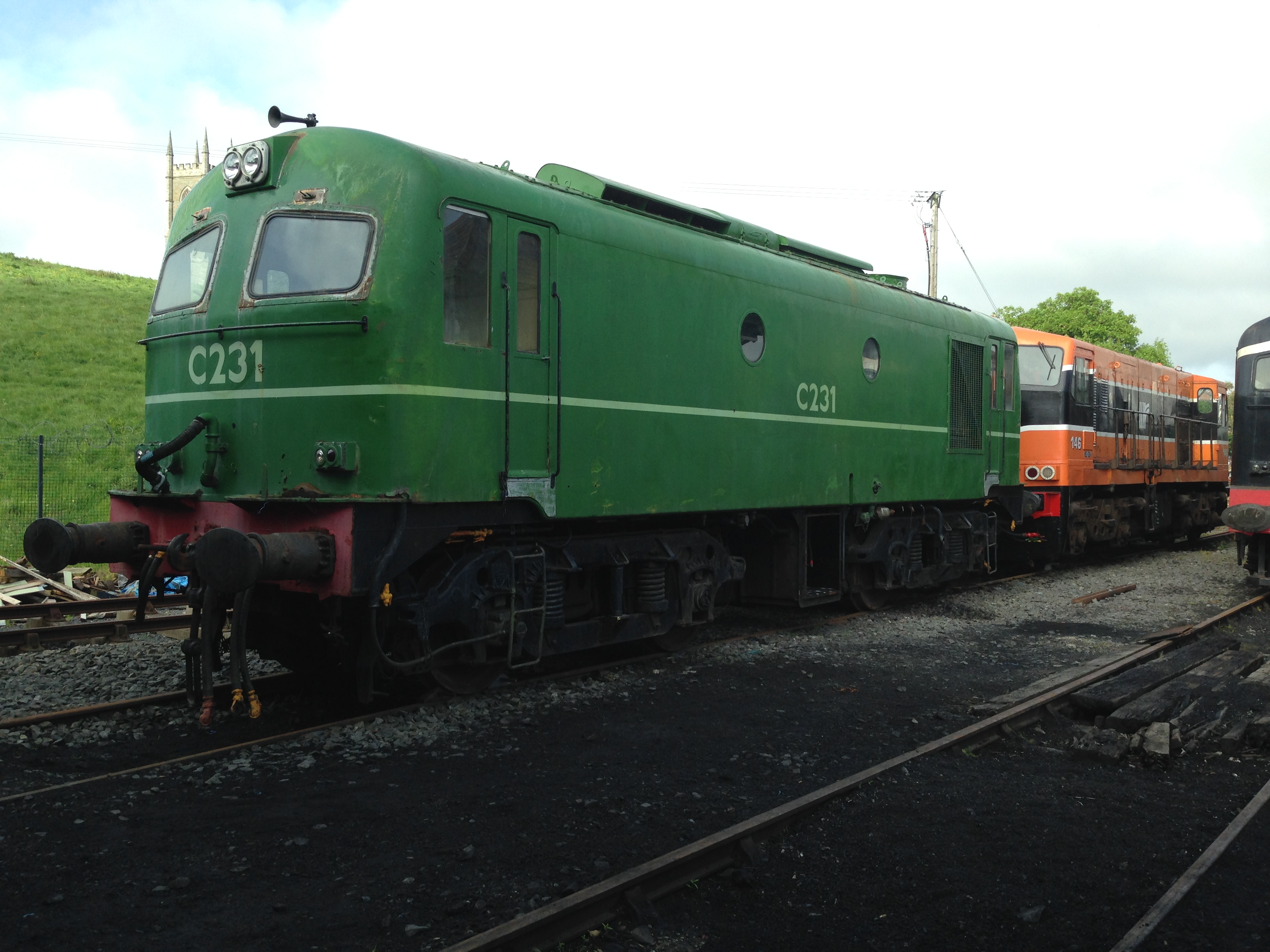
C231 at the Downpatrick and County Down Railway

Two 201 Class locomotives, numbers 226 and 231, have been preserved by the Irish Traction Group As of 2025, C231 was at the Downpatrick and County Down Railway, but not in service due to damage to its traction motors.. 226 was the first mainline diesel to be preserved in Ireland and is undergoing restoration at Carrick-on-Suir.

A third example was preserved privately and displayed at Cahersiveen, County Kerry. It was moved to Cahersiveen in 1997 and painted in the original silver livery and carried the number C202, which was supposedly the number of the locomotive hauling the last train from Cahersiveen in 1960. This locomotive was in fact NIR 106/CIÉ 227 and had been stripped of almost all internal equipment. While in Cahersiveen the locomotive suffered from vandalism and it was moved in 2007 to Waterford and again in 2013 to the West Clare Railway before being scrapped in 2025.

== Models ==
A brass and white metal kit for the C Class in 00 gauge originally produced by No Nonsense Kits is available from Phoenix Paints. A resin version is available from Silver Fox Models.
