= Glenariff Iron Ore and Harbour Company =

Coordinates: 54.9688°N 5.9526°W

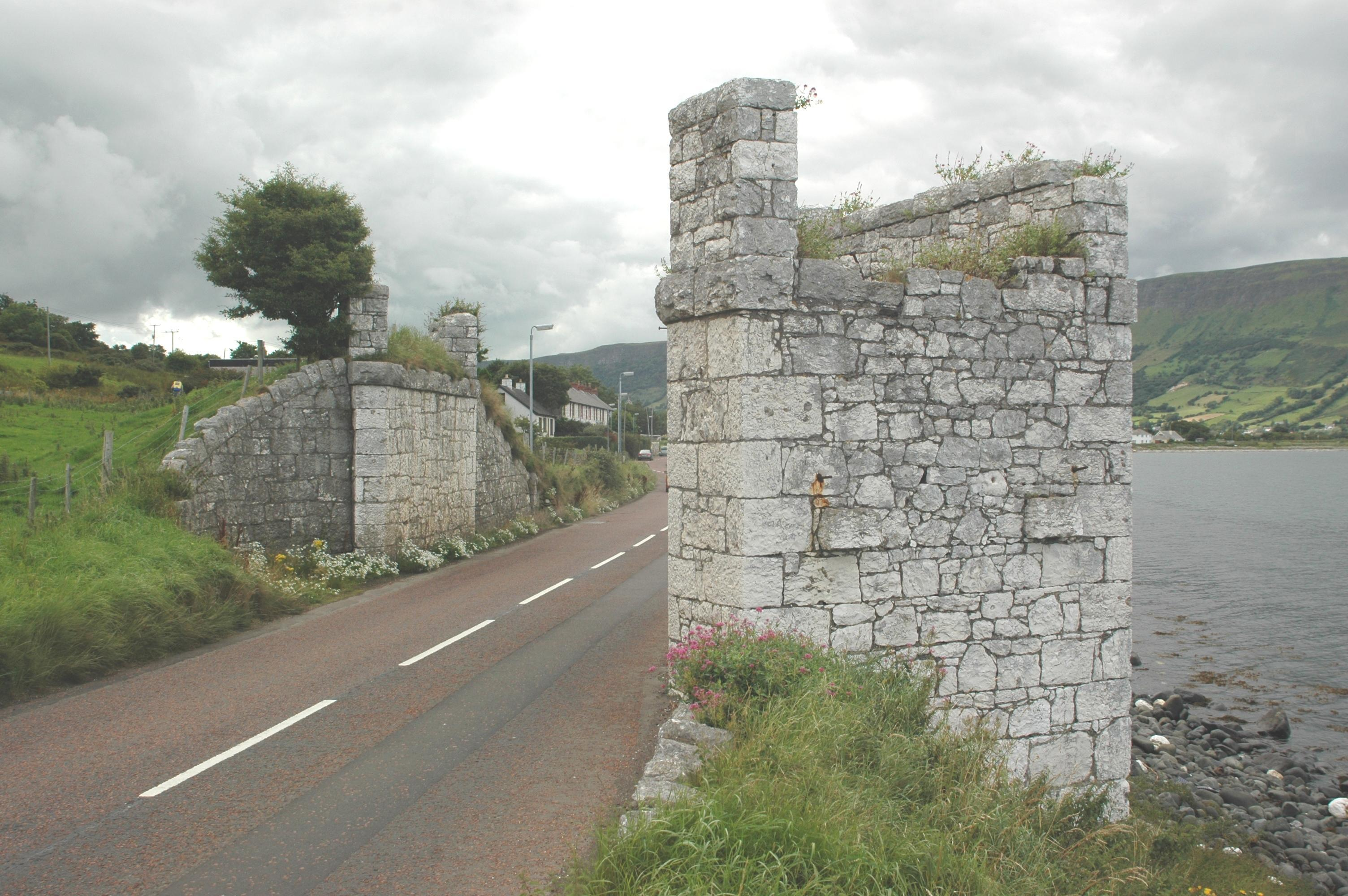
Piers of former GIOH railway bridge across Garron Road, Waterfoot, looking west

The Glenariff Iron Ore and Harbour Company (GIOH) was a railway and harbour company in Glenariff, County Antrim, in what is now Northern Ireland. It operated Red Bay Pier on the Antrim coast and about 4 miles (6.4 km) of narrow gauge railway between the pier and Cloughcor Mines in Glenariff. The railway was 3 ft (914 mm) narrow gauge and carried iron ore from the mines to the pier, where it was loaded onto cargo ships for export to ironworks in Scotland and England.

== History ==
The pier and railway were completed in 1873, making it the first 3 ft (914 mm) narrow gauge railway in Ireland. The railway operated two 2-4-0T tank locomotives built by Robert Stephenson & Company and built its own shunter with a vertical boiler that had previously powered a plant to crush stone for use as ballast. Ore was carried in four-wheeled wagons built by Ashbury Railway Carriage & Iron Company. Horses hauled the wagons onto Red Bay Pier, where the ore was manually shovelled from the wagons down wooden chutes into the ships.

Cloghcorr Mines produced less ore than the promoters hoped and the area was short of skilled and willing labour for the mine. Red Bay is not a sheltered harbour so ships at the pier were vulnerable to bad weather. The iron industry became depressed in the 1870s and in 1875 the GIOH ceased operation.

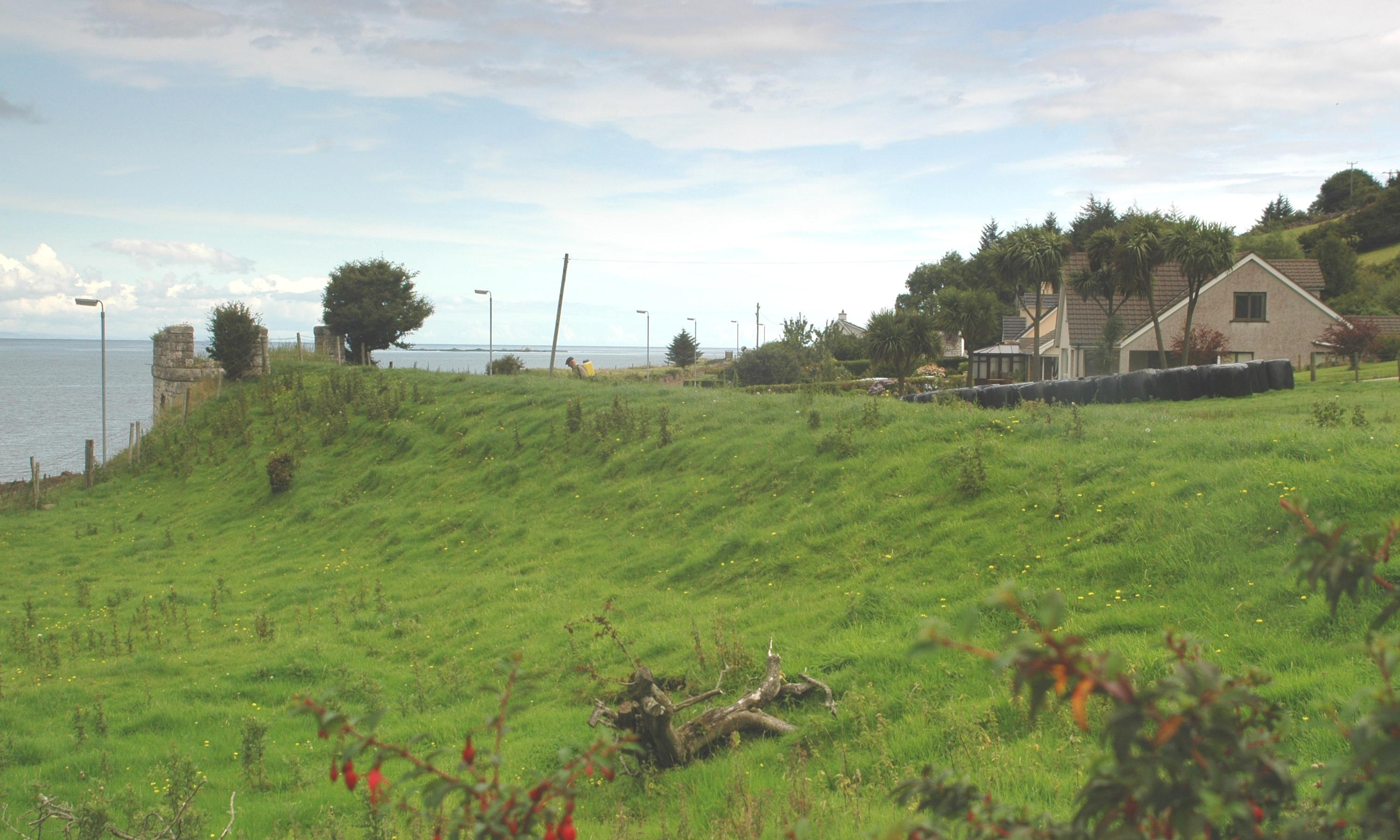
Embankment of former GIOH railway leading to bridge across Garron Road, Waterfoot, looking east

The track was left in place for a number of years. In 1880 William Traill, promoter of the Giant's Causeway, Portrush and Bush Valley Railway & Tramway Company, sought to build a 5 ft 3 in (1,600 mm) railway across Glenariff to link the GIOH line with Parkmore on the narrow gauge Ballymena, Cushendall and Red Bay Railway, which connected with Ireland's 5 ft 3 in (1,600 mm) railway network at Ballymena. Traill was unsuccessful and the GIOH line remained out of use.

The final attempt to revive the iron ore operation ended in about 1884 when the GIOH's growing losses forced it to default on its ground rent to William McDonnell, 6th Earl of Antrim. The Earl served a writ on the GIOH, which was duly wound up and its assets auctioned to defray its debts. The Londonderry and Lough Swilly Railway bought the two 2-4-0T locomotives and the iron ore wagons. The 2-4-0Ts were numbered 5 and 6 in the L&LSR locomotive fleet. In 1899 number 5 was scrapped and number 6 was renumbered 6A. 6A was scrapped in 1904.

The GIOH track was not lifted until 1890, after 3 miles (5 kilometres) of it had been stolen in a single night.

For a more detailed history of the Glenariff Mines and mineral railway see "The Mountains of Iron" chapters 6 and 10.

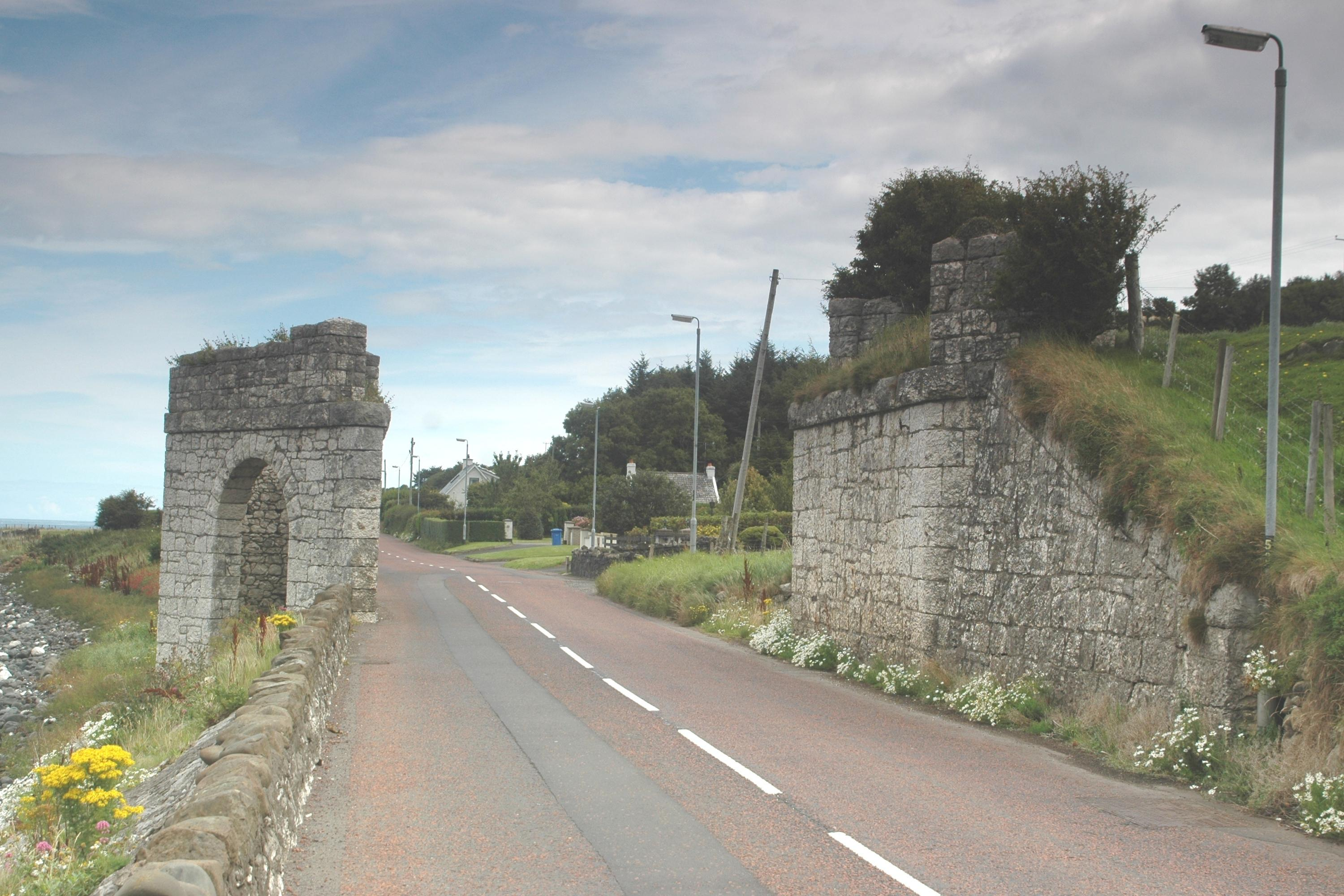
Piers of former GIOH railway bridge across Garron Road, Waterfoot, looking east

== White Arch ==
A bridge carried the railway across the Antrim Coast Road near Waterfoot. The span would have been iron or steel and has been removed, but the two Ulster White Limestone piers and the embankment approaching one of the piers survive. The piers are called the White Arch.

== Bibliography ==
- Hajducki, S Maxwell (1974). A Railway Atlas of Ireland. Newton Abbot: David & Charles. map 5, page xv. ISBN 0-7153-5167-2.
- McCutcheon, Dr. Alan (1969). Railway History in Pictures: Ireland Volume I. Newton Abbot: David and Charles. p. 67. ISBN 0-7153-4651-2.
