= Glen =

Name for valley commonly used in Ireland, Scotland and the Isle of Man

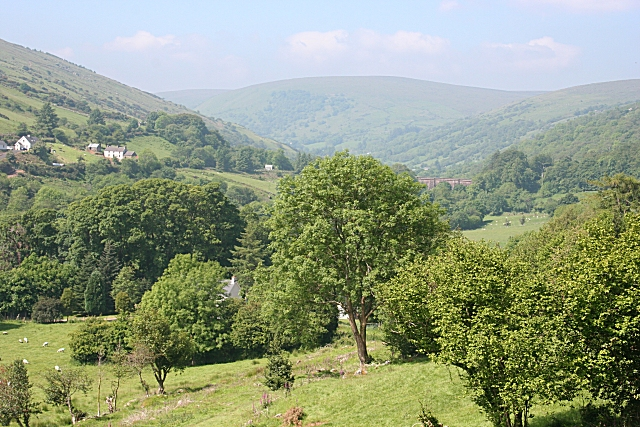
Glendun, one of the Glens of Antrim in Northern Ireland

A glen is a valley, typically one that is long and bounded by gently sloped concave sides, unlike a ravine, which is deep and bounded by steep slopes.

== Etymology ==
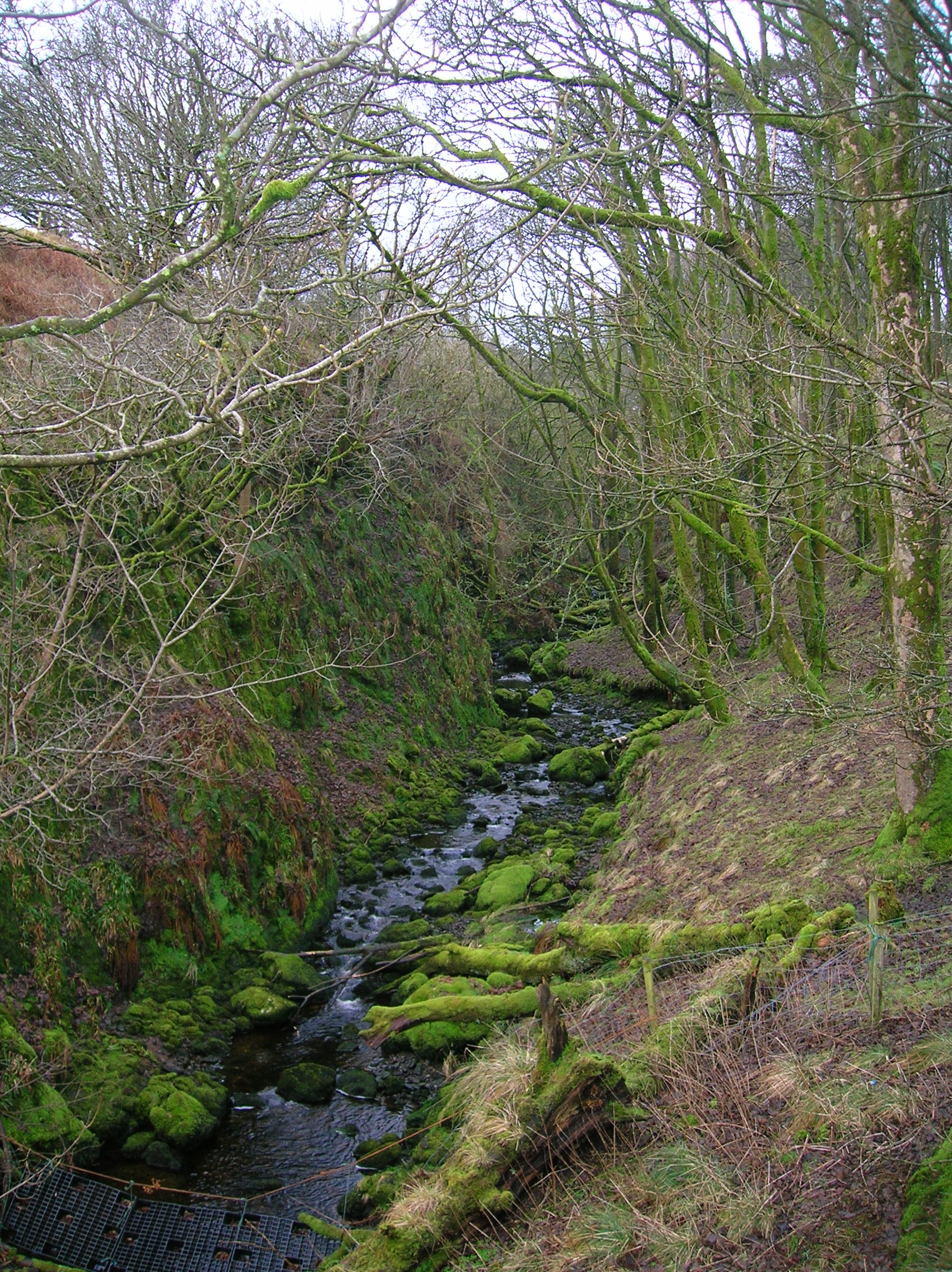
Raven's Craig Glen located in Dalry, North Ayrshire, Scotland

The word is Goidelic in origin: gleann in Irish and Scottish Gaelic, glion in Manx. The designation "glen" also occurs often in place names. In Manx, glan is also to be found meaning glen. It is cognate with Welsh glyn. Whittow defines it as a "Scottish term for a deep valley in the Highlands" that is "narrower than a strath".

Examples in Northern England, such as Glenridding, Westmorland, or Glendue, near Haltwhistle, Northumberland, are thought to derive from the aforementioned Cumbric cognate, or another Brythonic equivalent. This likely underlies some examples in Southern Scotland.

As the name of a river, it is thought to derive from the Irish word glan meaning clean, or the Welsh word gleindid meaning purity. An example is the Glens of Antrim in Northern Ireland where nine glens radiate out from the Antrim plateau to the sea along the coast between Ballycastle and Larne.

== Places ==
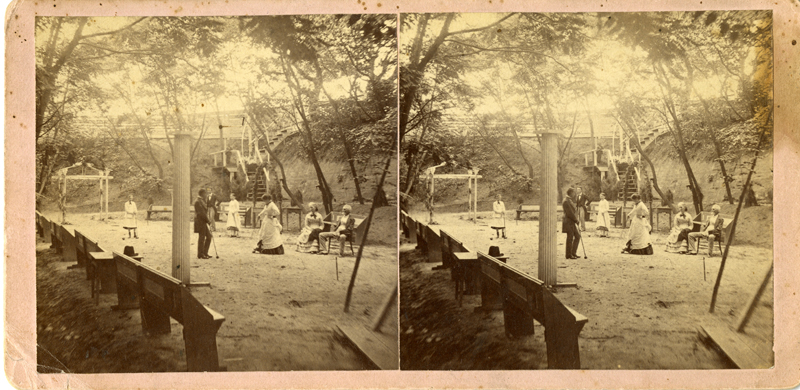
Robert's Glen in Macon, Georgia circa 1877

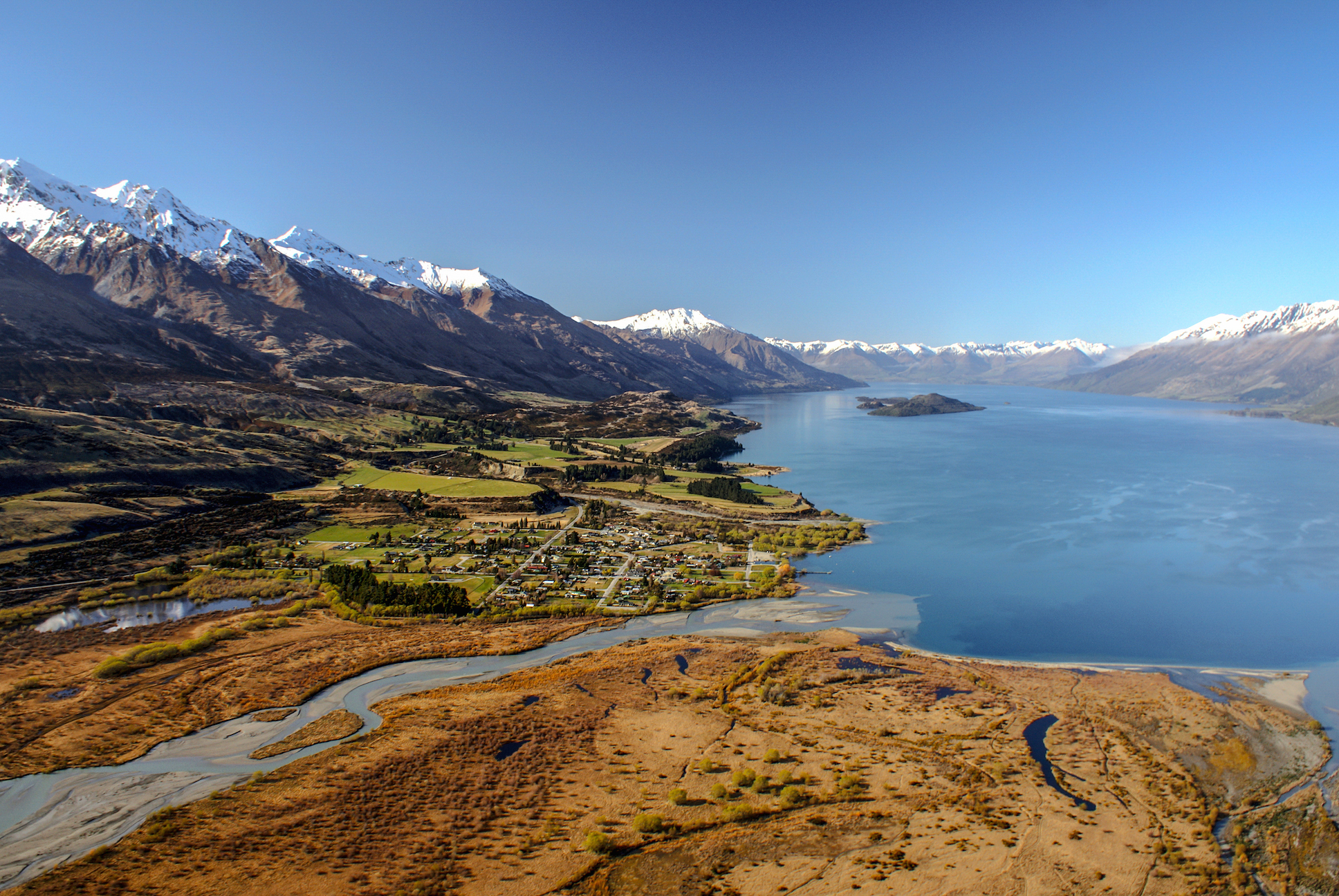
Glenorchy, in Otago, New Zealand

The designation "glen" also occurs often in place names such as Great Glen and Glenrothes in Scotland; Glendalough, Glenswilly, Glen of Aherlow, Glen of Imaal and the Glens of Antrim in Northern Ireland; Glenn Norman in Canada; Glendale, Glen Ellen and Klamath Glen in California, Glenview, Glen Carbon and Homer Glen in Illinois, and Glenrock in Wyoming; Glenview, Glen Waverley, Glen Eira, Glengowrie, Glen Huntly and Glen Forrest in Australia; and Glenorchy, Glendowie, Glen Eden, Glenledi, Glenomaru, Glen Massey, Glen Murray, Glenleith, Glendhu Bay, Glenbrook, and Glen Innes in New Zealand.

In the Finger Lakes region of New York State, the southern ends of Seneca Lake and Cayuga Lake in particular are etched with glens, although in this region the term "glen" refers most frequently to a narrow gorge, as opposed to a wider valley or strath. The steep hills surrounding these lakes are filled with loose shale from glacial moraines. This material has eroded over the past 10,000 years to produce rocky glens (e.g., Watkins Glen, Fillmore Glen State Park and Treman State Parks) and waterfalls (e.g., Taughannock Falls) as rainwater has flowed down toward the lakes below.

=== Scotland ===
Many place-names in Scotland with "glen" derive from the Gaelic gleann ("deep valley"), with some being from the cognates in the Brittonic languages Cumbric and Pictish or from the Gaelic loanword glen in Scots.

- Glenalmond, Perthshire
- Glen Affric, Inverness-shire
- Glenbarton, Dumfriesshire - from Gaelic *gleann-Breatann, or else Brittonic glyn-Brython ("Briton valley").
- Glencairn, Dumfriesshire
- Glen Coe, Argyll
- Glencortas, Fife - from Gaelic gleann + possibly coirthe ("standing stone") + as (locational suffix).
- Glendevon, Perthshire
- Glendevon, Lanarkshire
- Glendivan, Dumfriesshire
- Glendow, Dumfriesshire - from Middle Irish glenn-dubh or Brittonic glyn-du ("dark valley").
- Glen Doll, Perthshire
- Glenduckie, Fife - from Gaelic gleann + possibly duaigh ("evil") + -in (suffix).
- Glen Etive, Argyll
- Glengaber, Dumfriesshire
- Glenkens, Kirkcudbrightshire - Brittonic glyn + Ken (river name).
- Glenlochar, Kirkcudbrightshire
- Glen Ogle, Perthshire
- Glenrothes, Fife - from Scots glen + Rothes.
- Glensax, Peeblesshire
- Glensaxon, Dumfriesshire
- Glen Shiel, Ross and Cromarty
- Glentanner, Selkirkshire
- Glentenmont, Dumfriesshire
- Glenturk, Wigtownshire
- Glenturret, Perthshire
- Glen Vale, Fife - from Gaelic gleann-a’-bhealaich ("glen of the pass").

=== England ===
Some place-names in England contain the element "Glen". Many of these are derived from Brittonic cognates of Gaelic gleann (Welsh glyn).

- Glencoyne, Cumberland - Brittonic glyn or Middle Irish glenn + possibly a river name.
- Glendinning, Cumberland - Brittonic glyn or Middle Irish glen + Brittonic din ("fort") + an/in (suffix).
- Glendon, Devon - possibly a hybrid of Cornish glyn and Old English dun ("hill").
- Glendowlin, Westmorland - Brittonic glyn or Middle Irish glenn + earlier Brittonic du ("black") + llyn ("pool").
- Glendue, Northumberland
- Glendurgan, Cornwall - from Cornish glynn ("deep valley") + dowrgeun ("otters").
- Glenridding, Westmorland - equivalent to Old Welsh glinnredin ("bracken valley").
- Glyn Morlas, Shropshire
- Glynn Kenyel, Cornwall - from Cornish glynn ("deep valley") + ken ("meeting, confluence") + yel (adjectival suffix).

Note that some place-names in England with "Glen", such as Glen Parva in Leicestershire, are actually more likely to derive from river-names named with Brittonic glan ("shining").

=== Wales ===
Some place-names in Wales contain the element glyn ("valley").

- Emlyn, Pembrokeshire, from am-glyn ("at the valley")
- Glynceiriog, Denbighshire
- Glyncorrwg, Glamorgan
- Glynneath, Glamorgan
- Glynrhonwy, Caernarfonshire
- Glyn Tarell, Brecknockshire

=== Isle of Man ===
- Ballaglass Glen, Maughold
- Glen Maye, Glenfaba
- Glen Wyllin, Kirk Michael
- Groudle Glen, Onchan
- Silverdale Glen, Malhew
- Tholt-y-Will Glen, Lezayre - also known as Sulby Glen

== See also ==
- High valley – Valley in the upper third of a mountain range
- Strath – Large valley
- Dale (landform)
