= Barmeen =

Townland in County Antrim, Northern Ireland

Coordinates: 55.126°N 6.071°W

Barmeen is a townland in County Antrim, Northern Ireland. It is located at the foot of Glendun, one of the nine Glens of Antrim, west of Cushendun and north of Knocknacarry. It is situated in the historic barony of Cary and the civil parish of Culfeightrin and covers 59 acres.

The name derives from the Irish: Barr min (smooth top). The population of the townland declined during the 19th century:

Year	1841	1851	1861	1871	1881	1891
Population	35	43	47	40	21	26
Houses	5	7	6	6	5	5

== See also ==
- List of townlands in County Antrim
