= A43 road (Northern Ireland) =

Road in Northern Ireland

A43

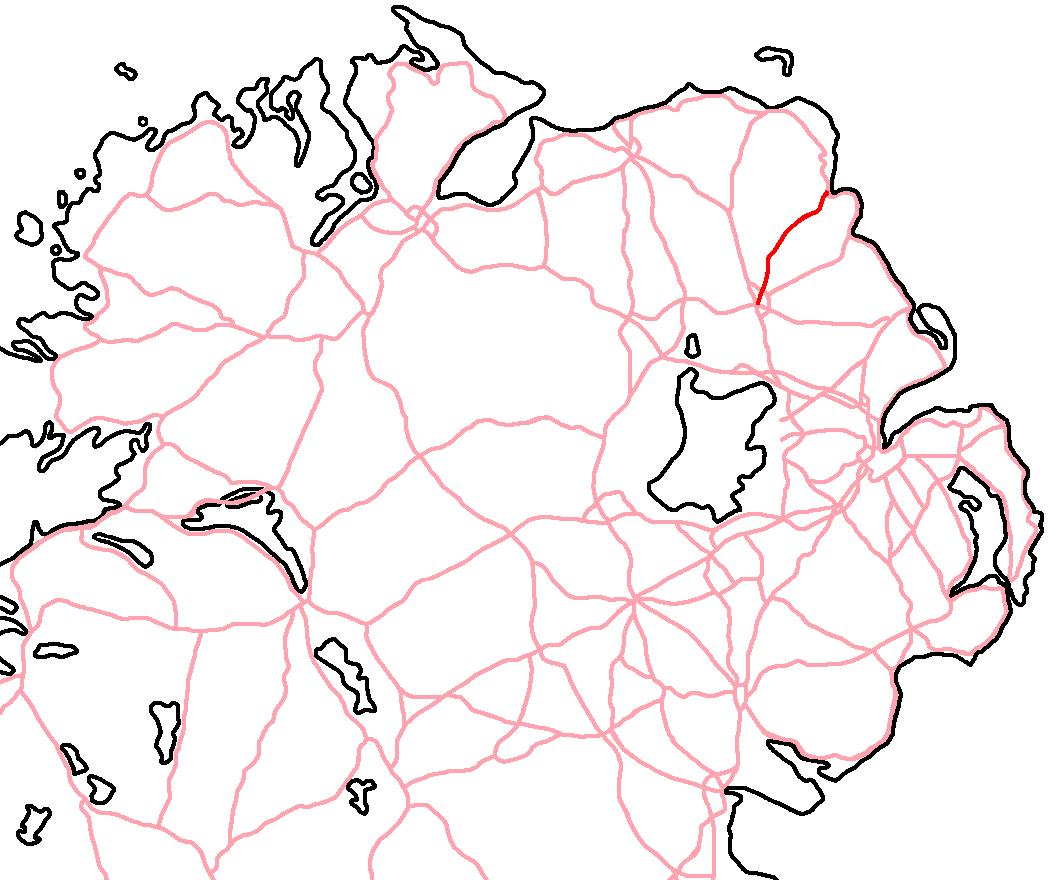

Location
- Country: United Kingdom
- Constituent country: Northern Ireland
- Primary destinations: Ballymena, Martinstown, Glenariff

Road network
- Roads in Northern Ireland; Motorways; A roads in Northern Ireland

The A43 is a primary route in east Ulster. The road starts in Ballymena, goes north, to Martinstown, then crosses the Antrim Hills, and descends into Glenure. The A43 terminates along the coast by A2, in the small town of Glenure.

Towns on its route are;

- Ballymena (for M2, A26, A36, A42)
- Martinstown
- Glenariff (for A2)
