= Cushendall Formation =

Geological formation in Northern Ireland

- Stratigraphic range: Early Devonian
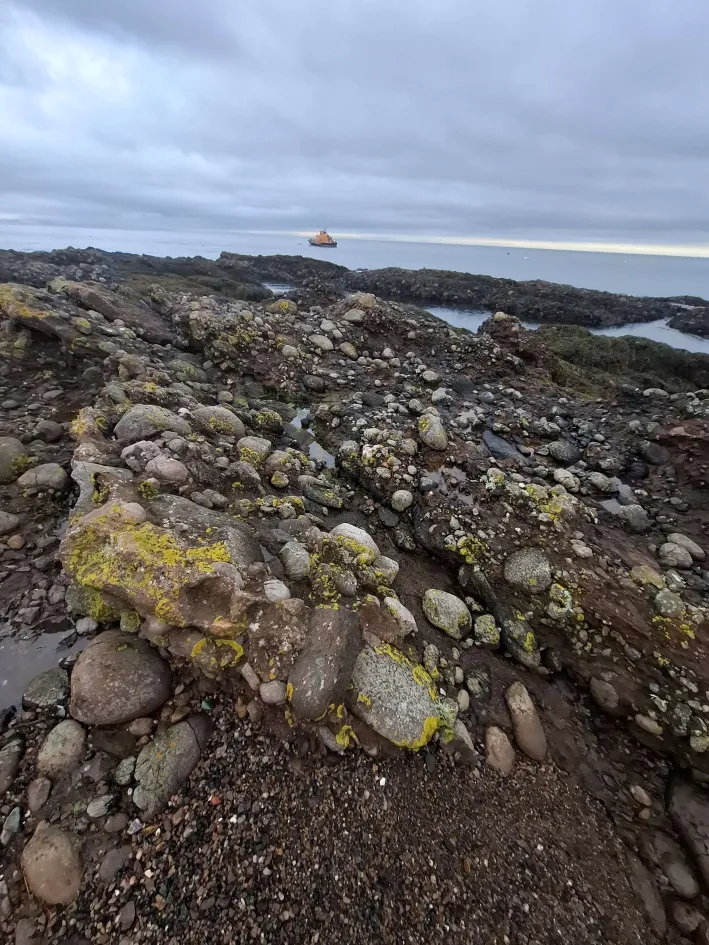
- Outcrop at Port Obe
- Type: Geological formation
- Unit of: Cross Sieve Group
- Underlies: Igneous porphyry
- Overlies: Ballyagan Formation
- Thickness: up to 600 metres (1,970 ft)

Lithology
- Primary: conglomerate, sandstone
- Other: Rhyolite, basalt

Location
- Region: County Antrim
- Country: Northern Ireland
- Extent: Cushendun Bay and Cushendun Caves

Type section
- Named for: Cushendall
- Named by: Simon
- Year defined: 1984

The Cushendall Formation is a geologic formation of Early Devonian age in Northern Ireland where it outcrops at Cushendall, County Antrim.

== History ==
Surveys of Cushendall were undertaken in 1886 and it was concluded that the rocks were metamorphic in origin. The first geological maps of the area were produced by Bailey & McCallien (1934), and Wilson (1953) was the first to conclude the rocks were Early Devonian in age and he placed them into the Old Red Sandstone as a new, unnamed member.

Simon (1984b) defined the Cushendall Formation as a separate geological formation when he defined the Cross Sieve Group.

== Geology and location ==
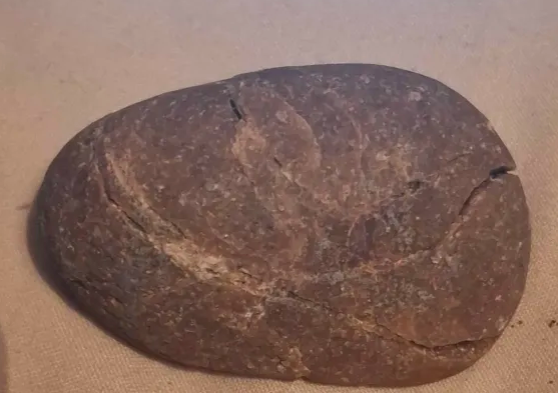
Individual clast from the Cushendall Formation

The Cushendall Formation is formed of rhyolite and basalt clasts overlain by conglomerate. The age of the formation can not be dated any more precisely than the Early Devonian due to the lack of fossils preserved, and it was part of the Cross Slieve Group in the Old Red Sandstone; it is believed it is the youngest of the three formations of the Cross Slieve Group. It is underlain by intrusive igneous porphyry and the formation is up to 600 metres (2,000 ft) thick in places.

The Cushendun Formation outcrops only at Port Obe, Cushendall on the northeastern section of Cross Slieve; the northeastern section is dominated by the Cushendun Formation.

== Paleogeography ==
It is believed that the Cushendall Formation represented an alluvial environment which at some point experienced volcanic activity.
