= Cross Roads railway station =

Railway station in County Antrim, Northern Ireland

Coordinates: 54.978796°N 6.2047°W

Cross Roads
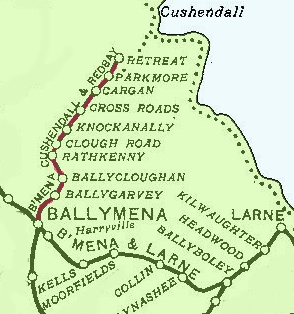
- The line in 1906

General information
- Location: Martinstown, County Antrim, County Antrim; Northern Ireland

Other information
- Status: Disused

History
- Original company: Ballymena, Cushendall and Red Bay Railway
- Pre-grouping: Ballymena, Cushendall and Red Bay Railway
- Post-grouping: Ballymena, Cushendall and Red Bay Railway

Key dates
- 1 August 1886: Station opens
- 1 October 1930: Station closes
Location

Cross Roads railway station was on the Ballymena, Cushendall and Red Bay Railway which ran from Ballymena to Retreat in County Antrim, Northern Ireland.

== History ==
The station was on the Ballymena, Cushendall and Red Bay Railway route and opened by the Belfast and Northern Counties Railway on 1 August 1886, which had taken ownership in October 1884.

The station closed to passengers on 1 October 1930.

Preceding station	Historical railways	Following station
Knockanally	Ballymena, Cushendall and Red Bay Railway; Ballymena-Retreat	Cargan
