= Moira O'Neill =

Irish-Canadian poet

- Born: Agnes Nesta Higginson; 13 July 1864; Mauritius
- Died: 22 January 1955 (aged 90)
- Spouse: Walter Clarmont Skrine
- Children: Charles John, Susan, Mary Nesta (Molly Keane), Godfrey Higginson and Walter Henry

Moira O'Neill was the pseudonym of Agnes Shakespear Higginson (1864–1955), an Irish-Canadian poet who wrote ballads and other verse inspired by County Antrim, where she lived at Cushendun. In 1895, she and her husband Walter Skrine lived on a 16,500 acre ranch in Alberta. But they returned to Ireland and were, in 1921, burned out of their mansion Ballyrankin House near Bunclody.

She also used the name Nesta. She published Songs of the Glens of Antrim (1900) and More Songs of the Glens of Antrim (1921). From the first of these collections, composer Charles Villiers Stanford selected the six poems of his song-cycle 'An Irish Idyll' (publ. 1901), dedicated to baritone Harry Plunket Greene, which includes one of Stanford's best-known songs, 'The Fairy Lough'. Her poem Sea Wrack was also set to music for voice and piano by the composer Hamilton Harty and this remains a popular work today.

== Early life and family ==
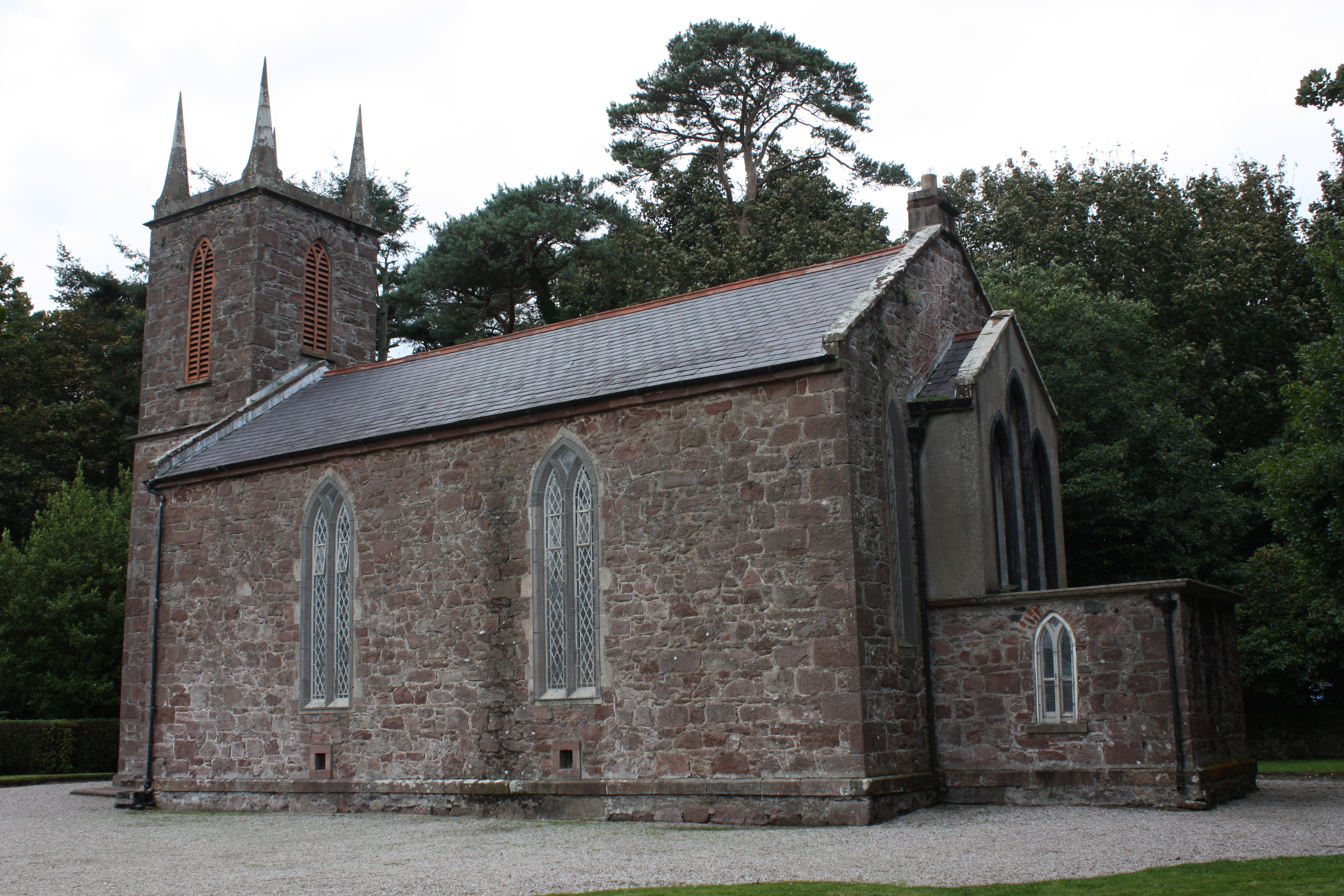
Old Church at Cushendun with plaque

Moira O'Neill was born in Mauritius on the 13th of July, 1864 and was raised in Cushendun, County Antrim in Ireland. Born Agnes Higginson and known as Nesta, Moira O'Neill was the pen name used to publish her poems. She was the youngest daughter of Charles Higginson, who was a colonial administrator in Mauritius, and Mary Higginson, who was the daughter of the Governor of Mauritius Sir James MacAuley. Charles and Mary were first cousins and raised seven children together, four boys and three girls. Agnes's brothers joined the military which then encouraged the family to move to Rockport, Cushendun in County Antrim.

On the 5th of June, 1895, Agnes married Walter Clarmont Skrine who was born in Warleigh Manor, County Somerset. The couple was married in Cushendun and after that moved to Alberta, Canada since Walter had land holdings placed there."The couple settled in the Bar S Ranch, 24 miles southwest of High River where Walter had nearly 17,000 acres under lease and built a new, two-story home for his family, the lumber freighted from Calgary by teams of horses". Agnes and Walter raised five children together, three sons and two daughters. Charles John and Susan were born in Canada. Mary Nesta, later known as renowned writer Molly Keane; Godfrey Higginson; and Walter Henry were all born in Ireland after the family moved back in 1902 and settled in the Ballyrankin House, Ferns, County Wexford. In 1921 the house was burned down during The Troubles in Ulster, forcing the Skrine family to move back to Northern Ireland and live with their cousins until the Skrine's home in Ballyrankin was restored.

== Later life and death ==
After marrying Walter Clarmont Skrine in 1895 the couple re located to live a rather secluded life on Walters 17,000-acre ranch 24 miles southwest of high river in Alberta Canada. They would live peacefully there for six years, starting a family, before returning to Moira’s beloved Ireland in 1902. With the family now growing larger, the family originally settled on the outskirts of Dublin in Ballymore Eustace County Kildare before moving ultimately to Ferns in County Wexford. Having had her family home in Ferns tragically burned down by republicans during the war of independence, Moira along with Husband Walter re located temporarily to the north of Ireland while they awaited the reconstruction of their home. It was during this stay in the north of Ireland that reminded her of the deep-rooted love for Antrim she still possessed, the county in which she was born, and inspired her to publish 'More songs of the Glens of Antrim' a somewhat sequel to her earlier release in 1901 'Songs of the glens of Antrim' one of Moira O'Neill's most coveted collections of poetry. Although Agnes took her husband's last name, she continued to write under her nom de plume 'Moira O'Neill' well into her later life as she continued to publish Poetry.

O'Neill and husband Walter had five children. Their daughter Mary went on to become a novelist and playwright who went under the pen names 'Molly Keane' and occasionally 'M.J Farrell'. It was in 1930 that O'Neill's husband Walter would pass away leaving his wife, then 65, to live another quarter of a century without him. With her children grown up and having never been a social character, O'Neill became even more introverted and isolated socially without her family present. Moira O'Neill died at Ballyrankin house in County Wexford on January 22, 1955, aged 90.
