= Cushendun Formation =

Geological formation in Northern Ireland

- Stratigraphic range: Early Devonian
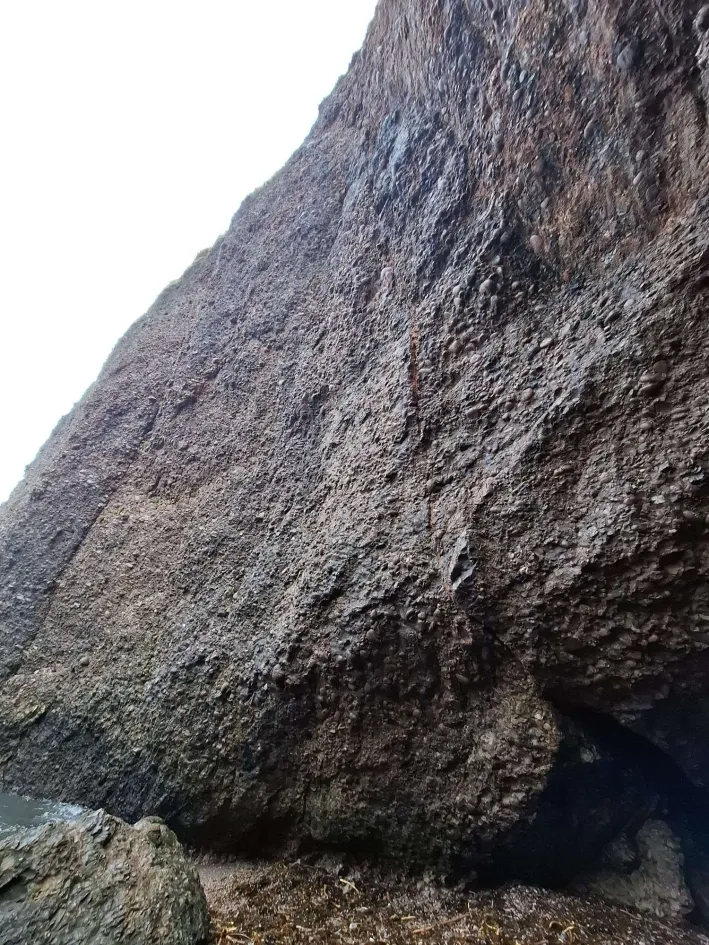
- Outcrop at Cushendun Bay
- Type: Geological formation
- Unit of: Old Red Sandstone
- Underlies: Ballyagan Formation and Cushendall Formation
- Overlies: Dalradian Supergroup (unconformity)
- Thickness: up to 600 metres (1,970 ft)

Lithology
- Primary: Breccia, schist, conglomerate
- Other: Quartzite

Location
- Region: County Antrim
- Country: Northern Ireland
- Extent: Cushendun Bay and Cushendun Caves

Type section
- Named for: Cushendun
- Named by: Simon
- Year defined: 1984b

The Cushendun Formation, also known as the Cushendun Conglomerate, is a geologic formation of Early Devonian age in Northern Ireland where it outcrops at Cushendun, County Antrim.

== History ==
Surveys of Cushendun Bay were undertaken in 1886 and it was concluded that the rocks were metamorphic in origin. The first geological maps of the area were produced by Bailey & McCallien (1934), and Wilson (1953) was the first to conclude the rocks were Early Devonian in age and he placed them into the Old Red Sandstone as a new, unnamed member.

Simon (1984b) defined the Cushendun Formation as a separate geological formation then known as the "Cushendun Conglomerate".

== Geology and location ==
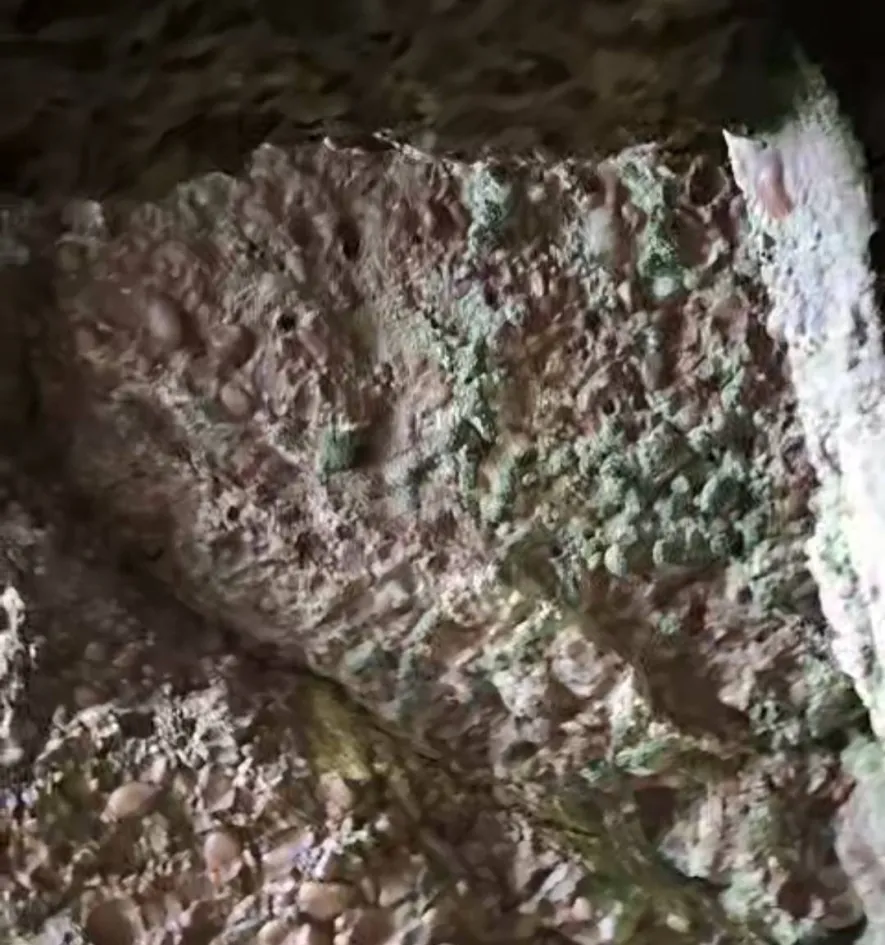
Outcrop at Cushendun Caves

The formation is formed of thin breccia clasts overlain by conglomerate and quartzite. The age of the formation can not be dated any more precisely than the Early Devonian due to the lack of fossils preserved, and it was part of the Cross Slieve Group in the Lower Old Red Sandstone. It overlies the Precambrian age Dalradian Supergroup at its base through an unconformity, and it underlies the Early Devonian age Ballyagan Formation. The formation is also up to 600 metres (2,000 ft) thick in places and has clasts of up to 20 centimetres (7.9 in) long.

The Cushendun Formation outcrops only at Cushendun Bay and the nearby Cushendun Caves (which formed the current cave system around 100,000 years ago) on the northeastern section of Cross Slieve; the southeastern section is dominated by the Cushendall Formation.

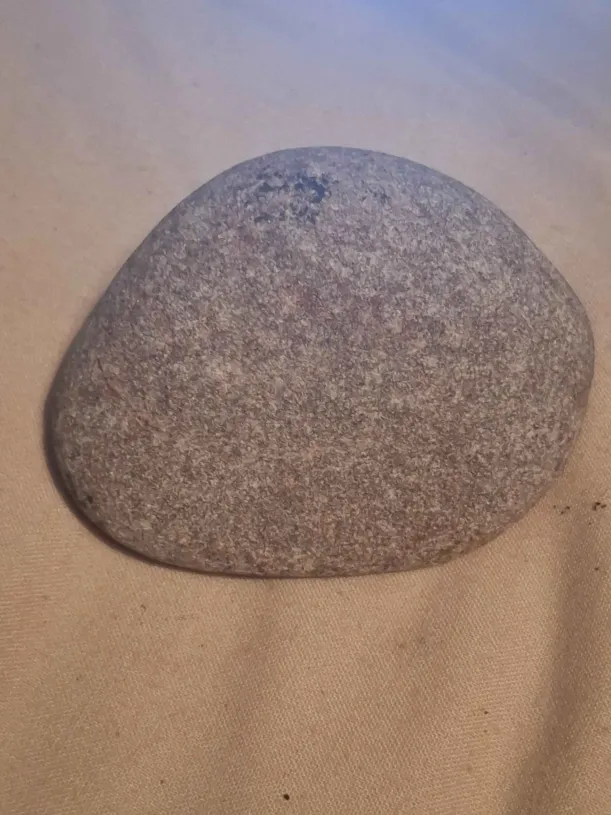
Individual clast from the Cushendun Formation

== Paleogeography ==
It is believed that the Cushendun Formation represented a desert environment where the larger rocks were deposited by a braided river stream.
