= Newtown Crommelin =

Village in County Antrim, Northern Ireland

Coordinates: 54°59′N 6°13′W

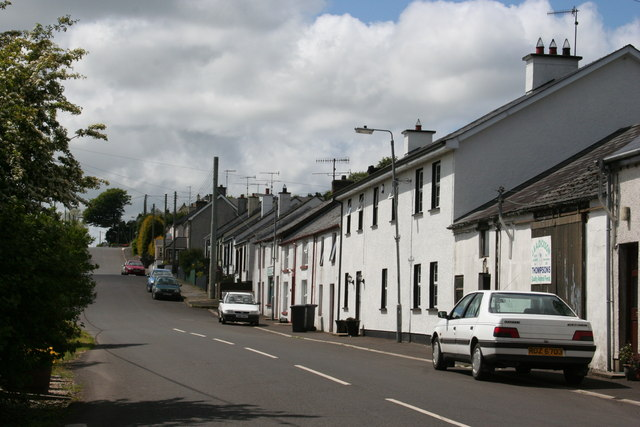
Newtown Crommelin

Newtowncrommelin (Irish: Baile Nua Chromlain) is a small village and civil parish in County Antrim, Northern Ireland. It lies 8 miles north-northeast of Ballymena and is in the Mid and East Antrim Borough Council area. The village of Newtowncrommelin was founded in the townland of Skerry (from Irish An Sceire, meaning 'rocky hill') (now the townlands of Skerry West and Skerry East).

Ballymena, Cargan and Martinstown can be viewed from atop Skerry Rock, which is accessible through private land, alongside the back of the Skerry Inn.

Most of the housing developments are situated along the Skerry East, Skerry West, Windy Gap, Tullykittagh and Old Cushendun Roads.

== See also ==
- List of towns and villages in Northern Ireland
- List of civil parishes of County Antrim
