= Glentaisie =

Glen in County Antrim, Northern Ireland

Coordinates: 55°10′27″N 6°17′15″W

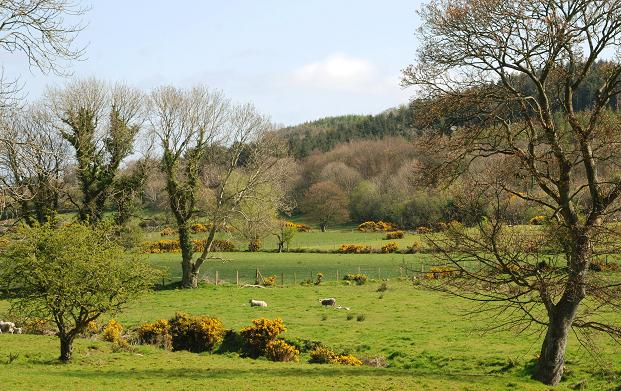
Glentaisie south of Ballycastle

Glentaisie (Irish: Taoibhgeal, English: of the bright cheeks) is one of the nine Glens of Antrim in County Antrim, Northern Ireland. It was shaped during the Ice Age by glaciers. The glen is most northerly of the nine glens and lies at the foot of Knocklayde mountain. The town of Ballycastle lies on the coast at the foot of the glen.

According to the traditional shanachies, Glentaisie was named after Princess Taisie, the daughter of King Dorm of Rathlin Island. Renowned for her beauty, she was betrothed to Congal, heir to the Kingdom of Ireland, however the King of Norway also sought her hand in marriage, and he arrived to claim his bride, as wedding celebrations to Congal were underway. The King of Norway and his army tried to capture Taisie but in the subsequent battle he was killed and his army fled leaderless and empty handed.

The Battle of Glentaisie, was fought in the Glentaisie area on 2 May 1565, with Shane O'Neill defeating Clan MacDonald of Dunnyveg in battle.
