= Francis Turnly =

Antrim landowner and philanthropist

Francis Turnly (born 1765/6, died 1845) was a landowner in Antrim who sought to improve the conditions for the people on the land he owned.

He was born in or around Newtownards, the son of Francis Turnly and Catherine Turnly, nee Black. Through his mother, he was related to the chemist, Joseph Black.

After studying at Glasgow University he worked for the East India Company. He worked for them, including in Guangzhou (then known as Canton), for 15 years. He sent some of his wages back to Northern Ireland to "wheaten bread and broth for the poor of Belfast".

When he returned to Northern Ireland in 1801 he purchased Richmond Lodge, near Holywood, and, in 1804, married Dorothea, daughter of John Rochfort. They had several children. He bought further properties at Cushendall and Drumnasole. Having bought the house at Drumnasole, he sought to improve local roadways between his properties. This included introducing a road through the rocky headlands. Part of this work lead to the construction of the Red Arch on the Antrim coastal way in 1817. He was also responsible for Turnly's Cut (1822), which eased passage around Garron Point.

He also built several schools in the area.

The schools and the roads were part of his philanthropic goals, which included building Turnley's Tower in Cushendall, and making provision for its maintenance. Many of his goals, and methods for reaching them, were viewed as eccentric

This eccentricity, and the large provision for philanthropic goals, led to his will being challenged after his death in 1845. Due to the provisions and the mental illness of his eldest son, the will was set aside

His great-great-grandson was John Turnley, the SDLP politician.
