= Ballaglass Glen =

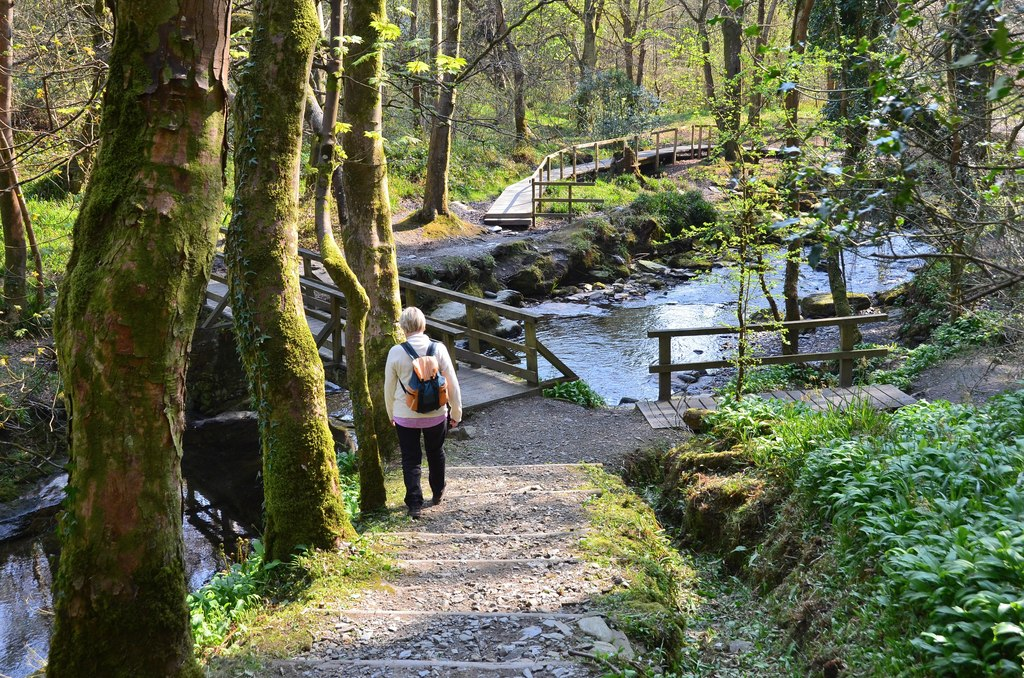
- Footbridge

- Location within Isle of Man

Naming
- Native name: Glion Valley Glass (Manx)

Geography
- Country: Isle of Man
- State/Province: Maughold
- Coordinates: 54°16′49″N 4°21′36″W
- River: Cornaa
- Interactive map of Ballaglass Glen

Ballaglass Glen (Manx: Glion Valley Glass) is a 6.4-hectare Manx National Glen located in the parish of Maughold, Isle of Man. It is a popular spot for photography and art.

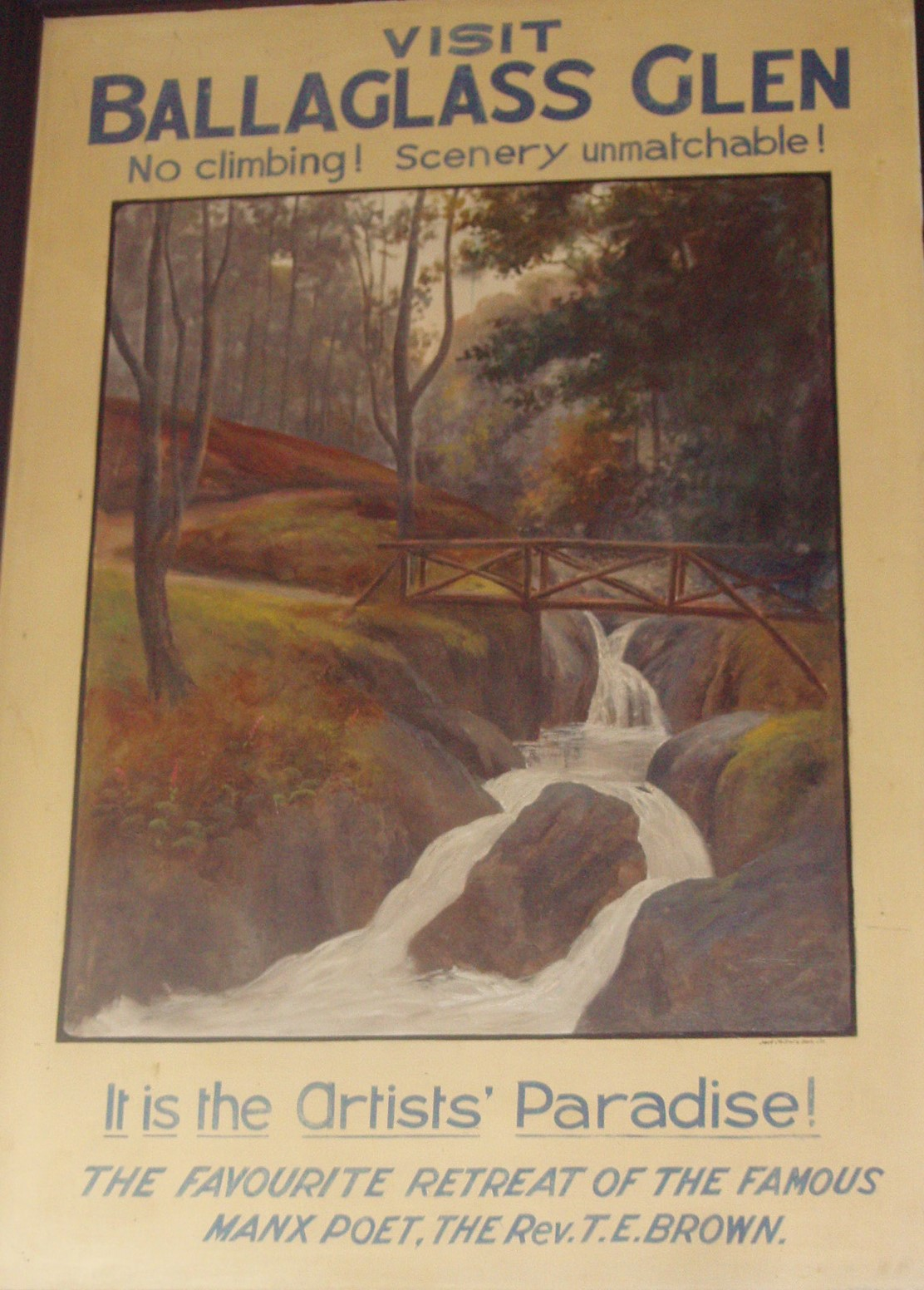
Visit Ballaglass Glen sign

== Toponymy ==
The glen is named after a nearby farm. Balla means farm or place, while glas means green or stream.

== Geography ==
The River Cornaa flows through the bedded grey flagstone rock of Ballaglass Glen on its way from the "North Barrule ridge of Clagh Ouyr" into the sea at Port Cornaa. Ballaglass Glen forms part of the lower valley, while the upper valley is called Corrany Valley (or Corony).

== History ==
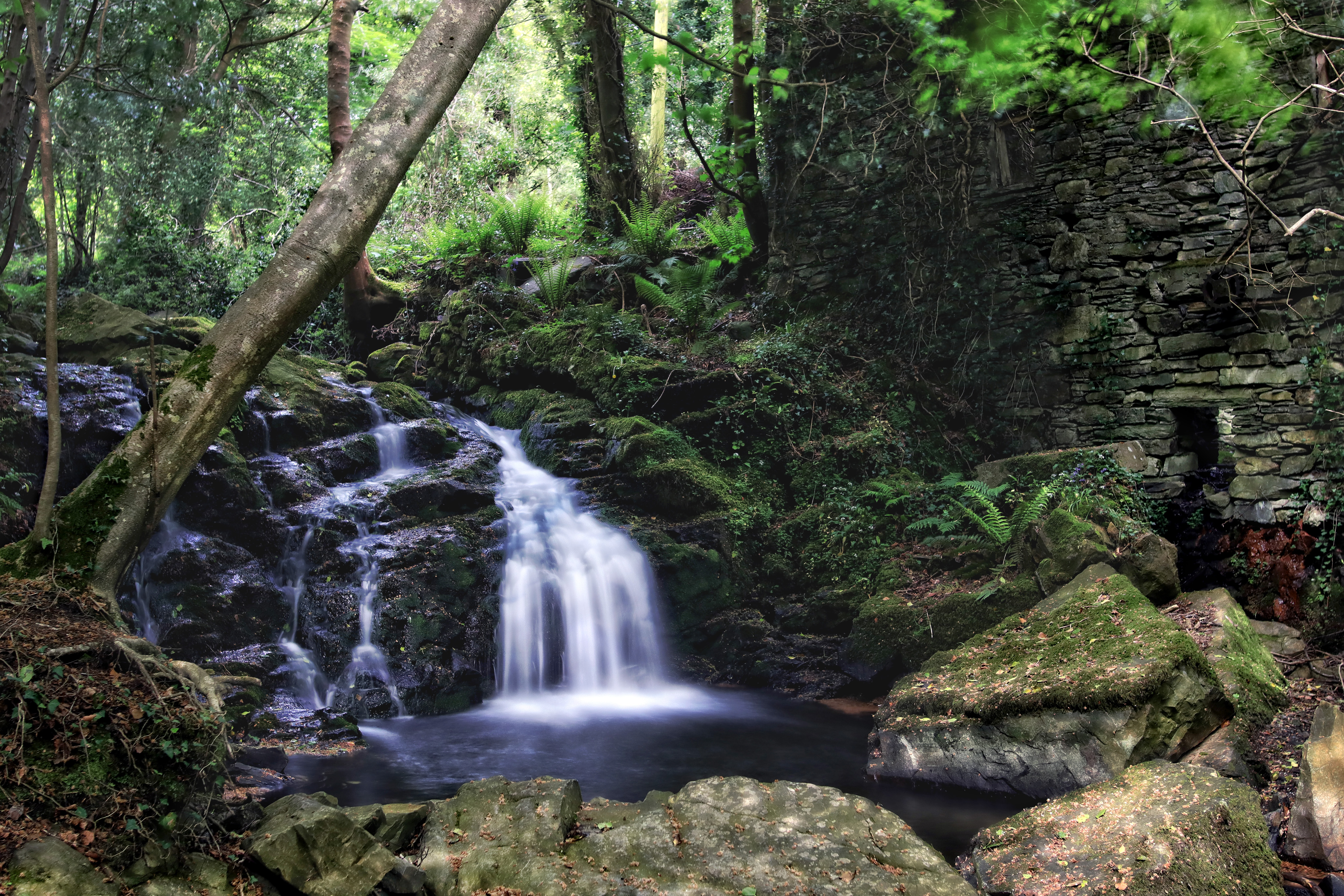
Derelict mill

The Great Mona Mining Company operated a speculative mine in Ballaglass Glen in the 1850s and 1860s, mining for copper, lead, and zinc in the river bed. A large wheel was built above the waterfall. The remains of stone buildings including an office and wheel casing can still be found.

Ballaglass Glen was the site of a corn mill until 1951 and a smaller flax mill. The corn mill had threshing facilities, a drying kiln and grinding machinery, while the flax mill left behind the ruins of a cog wheel.

In 1952, Ballaglass Glen was acquired by the Forestry Board.

Lag Vollagh Freshwater Fish Hatchery, also known as Cornaa Fish Farm, opened just south of Ballaglass Glen in 1972. The hatchery produces around 20 thousand rainbow trout a year. It is publicly owned and operated by Department of Environment, Food and Agriculture (DEFA) Fisheries office.

== Flora and fauna ==
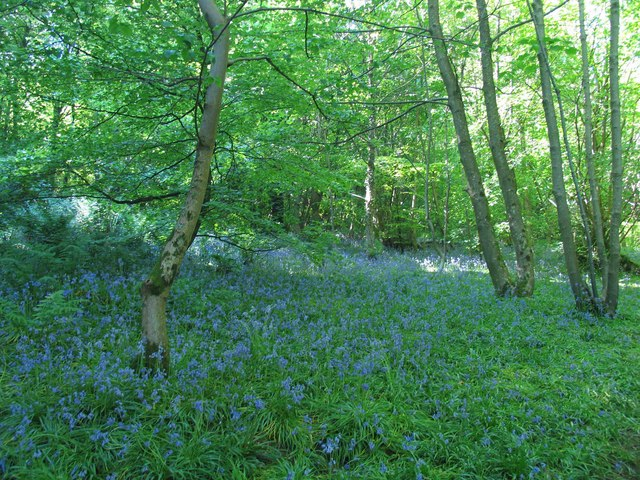
Bluebells

Ballaglass Glen is perhaps best known for its bluebells that bloom in the spring, earning it the nickname Bluebell Glen. The glen's marsh marigold and pink purslane wildflowers are reportedly a "rare sight elsewhere on the island". Also grown in spring is wild garlic. Other plant species found in the glen include lady's smock, field poppy, wood sorrel, liverwort, lesser celandine and purple loosestrife as well as bilberry.

Tall trees create a canopy over the rock bedded-stream. The trees include mature oak, beech, larch and pine as well as willow, birch and ash.

Bird species found in Ballaglass Glen include robins, mistle thrush and grey wagtails.

== Transport ==
Ballaglass Glen is served by Ballaglass Glen Halt on the Manx Electric Railway.
