= Glens of Antrim Historical Society =

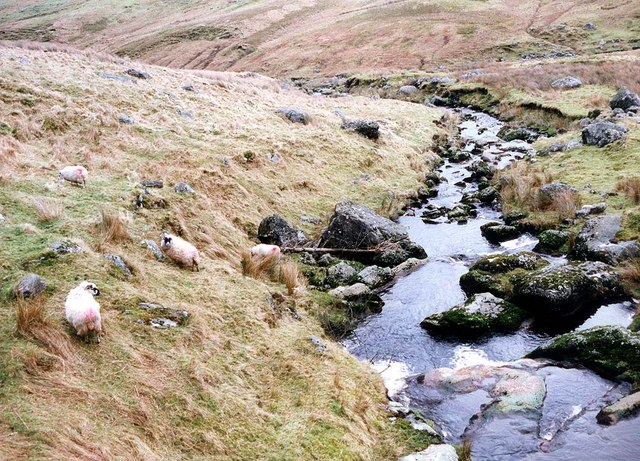
A moorland valley in the Glens of Antrim

The Glens of Antrim Historical Society (founded 1965) is a society for those interested in the history of the Glens of Antrim. It is recognised as one of the leading historical societies on the island of Ireland. Since 1975 it has published a journal called The Glynns.

== See also ==
- List of historical societies in Ireland
