= Cargan railway station =

Railway station in County Antrim, Northern Ireland

Coordinates: 54.996155°N 6.180367°W

Cargan
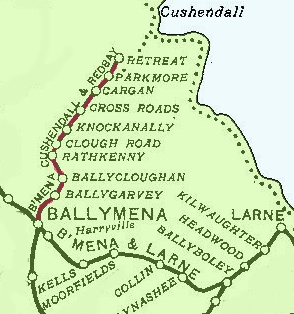
- The line in 1906

General information
- Location: Cargan, County Antrim; Northern Ireland

Other information
- Status: Disused

History
- Original company: Ballymena, Cushendall and Red Bay Railway
- Pre-grouping: Belfast and Northern Counties Railway
- Post-grouping: Northern Counties Committee

Key dates
- 1 July 1889: Station opens
- 1 October 1930: Station closes to passengers
- 12 April 1937: Station closes
Location

Cargan railway station served the local mines and the village of Cargan and was on the Ballymena, Cushendall and Red Bay Railway which ran from Ballymena to Retreat in County Antrim, Northern Ireland.

== History ==
The station was opened by the Belfast and Northern Counties Railway on 1 July 1889, which had taken ownership in October 1884.

The station connected to the local ironstone and bauxite mines via the Crommelin Mineral Tramway. The ore was then transported by rail to Ballymena and thence to Larne for shipment.

The station closed to passengers on 1 October 1930 following the line's loss of passenger traffic. It then closed completely on 12 April 1937.

== Routes ==
Preceding station	Disused railways	Following station
Cross Roads	Ballymena, Cushendall and Red Bay Railway; Ballymena-Retreat	Parkmore
