= Ballymena, Cushendall and Redbay Railway =

Railway in Ireland

Coordinates: 54.863°N 6.278°W

The Ballymena, Cushendall and Redbay Railway was a 3 ft (914 mm) narrow gauge railway between Ballymena and Retreat, both in County Antrim, in what is now Northern Ireland. It operated from 1875 to 1940.

== History ==
Ballymena, Cushendall and Redbay Railway Act 1872
- Act of Parliament
- Parliament of the United Kingdom
- Long title: An Act for making a Railway from the Belfast and Northern Counties Railway at Ballymena to Cushendall and Redbay; and for other purposes.
- Citation: 35 & 36 Vict. c. lxxxv

Dates
- Royal assent: 18 July 1872

Ballymena, Cushendall, and Redbay Railway Act 1878
- Act of Parliament
- Parliament of the United Kingdom
- Long title: An Act for empowering the Ballymena, Cushendall, and Redbay Railway Company to make certain new Railways; to acquire additional Lands; to divide their Shares; and for other purposes.
- Citation: 41 & 42 Vict. c. cxvii

Dates
- Royal assent: 4 July 1878

Text of statute as originally enacted

Ballymena, Cushendall and Redbay Railway Act 1880
- Act of Parliament
- Parliament of the United Kingdom
- Long title: An Act to authorise the Ballymena, Cushendall, and Redbay Railway Company to apply to the purposes of the Ballymena, Cushendall, and Redbay Railway Act, 1872, a sum of twenty-two thousand pounds which they are authorised to raise under the Powers of the Ballymena, Cushendall, and Redbay Railway Act, 1878, and which is not required for the purposes of that Act.
- Citation: 43 & 44 Vict. c. cv

Dates
- Royal assent: 2 August 1880

Text of statute as originally enacted

Ballymena, Cushendall, and Redbay Railway Act 1883
- Act of Parliament
- Parliament of the United Kingdom
- Long title: An Act to revive and extend the Time limited by the Ballymena Cushendall and Redbay Railway Act 1878 for the compulsory taking of Lands and to extend the Time limited by that Act for the completion of the Railway thereby authorised; and for other purposes.
- Citation: 46 & 47 Vict. c. cxxviii

Dates
- Royal assent: 16 July 1883

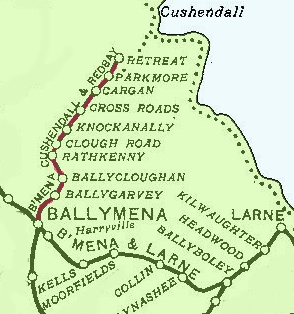
The line in 1906

The railway line was incorporated by the Ballymena, Cushendall and Redbay Railway Act 1872 (35 & 36 Vict. c. lxxxv), opened in May 1875 and was the first narrow gauge railway in Ireland to be sanctioned by Parliament. It was essentially a mineral railway which ran for 16 1/4 miles from Ballymena to Retreat. It served iron mines in the area, which were connected to the mainline by sidings and branch lines, some of which were owned by mining companies. Initially it was financially successful, but later the market collapsed and in October 1884 it was taken over by the Belfast and Northern Counties Railway (BNCR), the sale having been approved by Parliament on 14 July 1884. In 1886 the first passenger trains were introduced, which terminated at Parkmore, some 2 3/4 miles from Retreat.

For most of the route from Ballymena trains had to struggle against the gradient taking 50 minutes for the northbound journey and returning in 40 minutes. The summit at Essathohan siding was 1,045 feet (319 m) above sea level, the highest point reached by an Irish railway. To reach the tourist areas of Cushendall and Glenariff, passengers had to hire road transport from the Parkmore terminus. At the start three Black Hawthorn 0-4-2ST engines were used, but these were replaced by the BNCR. Passengers were transported in tramway type bogie carriages. Passenger traffic ceased in 1930 and goods traffic ceased in 1940.

== Route ==
- Ballymena railway station
- Ballygarvey railway station, 2 3/4-miles, open for passenger traffic 01/10/1888 to final closure 01/10/1930.
- Ballycloughan railway station, 4-miles, open for passenger traffic from 05/04/1886 to 01/10/1930, goods & final closure 03/06/1940.
- Rathkenny railway station, 6-miles, open for passenger traffic from 05/04/1886 to 01/10/1930, goods closure 12/04/1937, final closure 03/06/1940.
- Clough Road railway station, 6 3/4-miles, open for passenger traffic from 05/04/1886, goods, passenger & final closure 01/10/1930.
- Knockanally railway station (renamed Martinstown 01/07/1920), 8 1/4-miles, open for passenger traffic from 05/04/1886 to 01/10/1930, goods & final closure 12/04/1937.
- Cross Roads railway station (formerly Carrowcowan), 9 3/4-miles, open for passenger traffic from 01/08/1886. Goods, passenger & final closure 01/10/1930.
- Cargan railway station, 11 1/4-miles, open for passenger traffic from 01/06/1889 to 01/10/1930, goods closure 07/1923, final closure 12/04/1937.
- Parkmore railway station, 13 1/2-miles, open for passenger traffic from 01/09/1888. Goods, passenger & final closure 01/10/1930.
- Retreat railway station (County Antrim), 16 1/4-miles.

== See also ==
- Ballycastle Railway
- Ballymena and Larne Railway
- List of narrow-gauge railways in Ireland
