= Ballycloughan railway station =

Railway station in County Antrim, Northern Ireland

Coordinates: 54.907952°N 6.240559°W

Ballycloughan
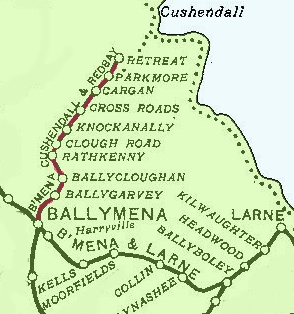
- The line in 1906

General information
- Location: Ballycloughan, County Antrim; Northern Ireland
- Platforms: 1

Other information
- Status: Disused

History
- Original company: Ballymena, Cushendall and Red Bay Railway
- Pre-grouping: Belfast and Northern Counties Railway
- Post-grouping: Northern Counties Committee

Key dates
- 5 April 1886: Station opens
- 1 October 1930: Station closes to passengers
- 3 June 1940: Station closes
Location

Ballycloughan railway station was on the 3-ft narrow gauge Ballymena, Cushendall and Red Bay Railway which ran from Ballymena to Retreat in County Antrim, Northern Ireland.

== History ==
The station was on the Ballymena, Cushendall and Red Bay Railway route and opened by the Belfast and Northern Counties Railway on 5 April 1886, which had taken ownership in October 1884.

The line lost its passenger traffic on 1 October 1930 and eventually closed completely on 3 June 1940.

== Routes ==
Preceding station	Disused railways	Following station
Ballygarvey	Ballymena, Cushendall and Red Bay Railway; Ballymena-Retreat	Rathkenny
