= Clough Road railway station =

Station in County Antrim, Northern Ireland

Coordinates: 54.942182°N 6.251178°W

Clough Road
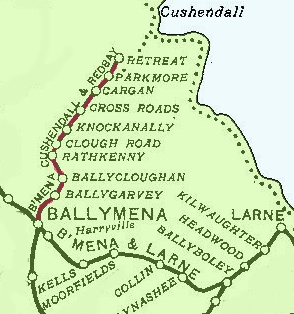
- The line in 1906

General information
- Location: Clough Road, County Antrim; Northern Ireland

Other information
- Status: Disused

History
- Original company: Ballymena, Cushendall and Red Bay Railway
- Pre-grouping: Ballymena, Cushendall and Red Bay Railway
- Post-grouping: Ballymena, Cushendall and Red Bay Railway

Key dates
- 5 April 1886: Station opens
- 1 October 1930: Station closes
Location

Clough Road railway station was on the Ballymena, Cushendall and Red Bay Railway which ran from Ballymena to Retreat in County Antrim, Northern Ireland.

== History ==
The station was on the Ballymena, Cushendall and Red Bay Railway route and opened by the Belfast and Northern Counties Railway on 5 April 1886, which had taken ownership in October 1884.

The station closed to passengers on 1 October 1930.

Preceding station	Historical railways	Following station
Rathkenny	Ballymena, Cushendall and Red Bay Railway; Ballymena-Retreat	Knockanally
