= Ballygarvey railway station =

Railway station in County Antrim, Northern Ireland

Coordinates: 54.88937°N 6.244097°W

Ballygarvey
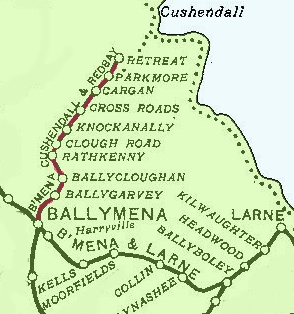
- The line in 1906

General information
- Location: Ballygarvey, County Antrim; Northern Ireland

Other information
- Status: Disused

History
- Original company: Ballymena, Cushendall and Red Bay Railway
- Pre-grouping: Ballymena, Cushendall and Red Bay Railway
- Post-grouping: Ballymena, Cushendall and Red Bay Railway

Key dates
- 1 October 1888: Station opens
- 1 October 1930: Station closes
Location

Ballygarvey railway station was on the Ballymena, Cushendall and Red Bay Railway which ran from Ballymena to Retreat in County Antrim, Northern Ireland.

== History ==
The station was on the Ballymena, Cushendall and Red Bay Railway route and opened by the Belfast and Northern Counties Railway on 18 October 1888, which had taken ownership in October 1884.

The station closed to passengers on 1 October 1930.

Preceding station	Historical railways	Following station
Ballymena	Ballymena, Cushendall and Red Bay Railway; Ballymena-Retreat	Ballycloughan
