= Rathkenny railway station =

Former railway station in County Antrim, Northern Ireland

Coordinates: 54.935106°N 6.255856°W

Rathkenny
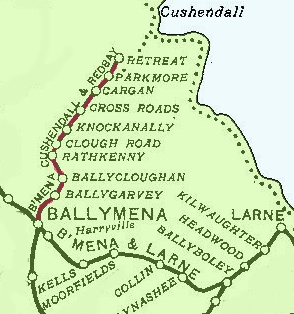
- The line in 1906

General information
- Location: Rathkenny, County Antrim; Northern Ireland

Other information
- Status: Disused

History
- Original company: Ballymena, Cushendall and Red Bay Railway
- Pre-grouping: Belfast and Northern Counties Railway
- Post-grouping: Northern Counties Committee

Key dates
- 5 April 1886: Station opens
- 1 October 1930: Station closes to passengers
- 12 April 1937: Station closes to goods
- 3 June 1940: Station closes completely
Location

Rathkenny railway station was on the Ballymena, Cushendall and Red Bay Railway which ran from Ballymena to Retreat in County Antrim, Northern Ireland.

== History ==
The station was on the Ballymena, Cushendall and Red Bay Railway route and opened by the Belfast and Northern Counties Railway on 5 April 1886, which had taken ownership in October 1884.

The line closed to passengers on 1 October 1930 and then completely on 3 June 1940.

== Routes ==
Preceding station	Disused railways	Following station
Ballycloughan	Ballymena, Cushendall and Red Bay Railway; Ballymena-Retreat	Clough Road
