= Retreat railway station (Northern Ireland) =

Former railway station in County Antrim

Coordinates: 55.049749°N 6.116145°W

Retreat
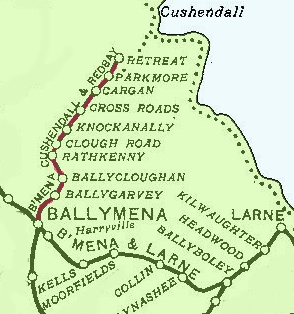
- The line in 1906

General information
- Location: County Antrim; Northern Ireland

Other information
- Status: Disused

History
- Original company: Ballymena, Cushendall and Red Bay Railway
- Pre-grouping: Ballymena, Cushendall and Red Bay Railway
- Post-grouping: Ballymena, Cushendall and Red Bay Railway

Key dates
- May 1875: Station opens
- 1940: Station closes
Location

Retreat railway station was on the Ballymena, Cushendall and Red Bay Railway which ran from Ballymena to Retreat in County Antrim, Northern Ireland.

== History ==
The station was on the Ballymena, Cushendall and Red Bay Railway route and opened by that company in October 1876 for goods traffic only.

The station was only ever for freight loading, and was never open to passenger services.

Preceding station	Historical railways	Following station
Parkmore	Ballymena, Cushendall and Red Bay Railway; Ballymena-Retreat	Terminus
