= Cargan =

Hamlet in County Antrim, Northern Ireland

Coordinates: 54°59′37″N 6°10′55″W

Cargan: Irish: Carraigín
- The Legagrane Road in Cargan

- Location within Northern Ireland
- Population: 588 (2011 census)
  - Belfast: 25 mi (40 km)
- District: Mid and East Antrim
- County: County Antrim
- Country: Northern Ireland
- Sovereign state: United Kingdom
- Post town: BALLYMENA
- Postcode district: BT43
- Dialling code: 028
- Police: Northern Ireland
- Fire: Northern Ireland
- Ambulance: Northern Ireland
- UK Parliament: North Antrim
- NI Assembly: East Antrim

Cargan (from Irish an Carraigín, meaning 'the small rock') is a hamlet and townland in County Antrim, Northern Ireland. It lies at the foot of Slievenanee in Glenravel – locally known as "The Tenth Glen" along with the more widely known nine Glens of Antrim. It is part of Mid and East Antrim district. It had a population of 588 people (223 households) in the 2011 census.

== History ==
One of the earliest anglicisations of the townland of Cargan is Carrigan. In the late 1800s, the village of Cargan was known as Fisherstown. An iron ore mine was opened up around the same time. The ore was shipped to Barrow-in-Furness, first by horse, then from 1875 by railway to Ballymena. The railway closed in 1937.

== Transport ==
The Ballymena to Cargan railway line was opened in 1875 and extended to Parkmore and Retreat in 1876. Cargan railway station opened on 1 June 1894, was closed for passenger traffic on 1 October 1930, and finally closed altogether on 12 April 1937. It was on the Ballymena, Cushendall and Red Bay Railway which operated narrow gauge railway services from Ballymena to Parkmore from 1875 to 1940.

== Demographics ==
On census day in 2011, there were 588 people living in Cargan. Of these, 91.2% were from a Catholic background and 6.5% were from a Protestant background.

== See also ==
- List of villages in Northern Ireland
- List of places in County Antrim
