= Knockanally railway station =

Former railway station in County Antrim, Northern Ireland

Coordinates: 54.962636°N 6.226158°W

Knockanally
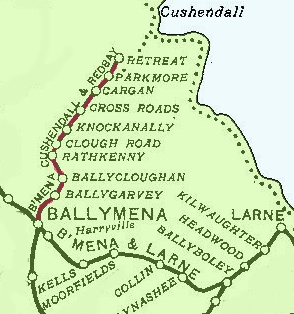
- The line in 1906

General information
- Location: Martinstown, County Antrim, County Antrim; Northern Ireland

Other information
- Status: Disused

History
- Original company: Ballymena, Cushendall and Red Bay Railway
- Pre-grouping: Belfast and Northern Counties Railway
- Post-grouping: Northern Counties Committee

Key dates
- 5 April 1886: Station opens
- 1 July 1920: Renamed Martinstown
- 1 October 1930: Station closes to passengers
- 12 April 1937: Station closes
Location

Knockanally railway station, later known as Martinstown railway station was on the Ballymena, Cushendall and Red Bay Railway which ran from Ballymena to Retreat in County Antrim, Northern Ireland.

== History ==
The station was on the Ballymena, Cushendall and Red Bay Railway route and opened by the Belfast and Northern Counties Railway on 5 April 1886, which had taken ownership in October 1884.

On 1 July 1920 it was renamed Martinstown.

The station closed to passengers on 1 October 1930 following the line's loss of passenger traffic. It then closed completely on 12 April 1937.

Preceding station	Disused railways	Following station
Clough Road	Ballymena, Cushendall and Red Bay Railway; Ballymena-Retreat	Cross Roads
