= River Dun (Northern Ireland) =

River in Northern Ireland

Coordinates: 55.12487°N 6.04574°W

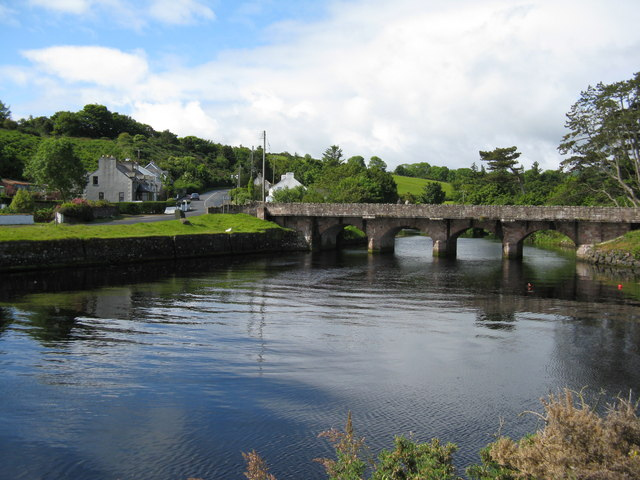
River Dun at Cushendun

The River Dun, also known as the Glendun River (in Irish: Abhann Duinne, brown river) is a river in County Antrim, Northern Ireland. It runs through Glendun, one of the nine Glens of Antrim. The river is named after its brown colour, which comes from the peat bogs at its source on the slopes of Slievenanee on the Antrim Plateau. The source of the river is a few hundred metres from that of the River Bush, which flows north-east to meet the sea at Bushmills. Cushendun (Bun Abhann Duinne, "foot of the River Dun" in Irish – although the English name derives from Cois Abhann Duinne, "beside the River Dun") is a small coastal resort town lying at the mouth of the River Dun and Glendun.

== Glendun Viaduct ==
The river is spanned by the Glendun Viaduct. The arched viaduct, known locally as the Big Bridge, was built between 1834 and 1839 by workers from County Monaghan and County Donegal.

== Angling ==
The river supports a population of brown trout which rarely attain weights exceeding one pound due to the naturally acidic chemistry of the water. Sea trout and salmon enter the river and make their way to the upstream spawning beds from July onwards. Eels are also present.

== See also ==
- List of rivers of Ireland
