= Knocknacarry =

Hamlet in County Antrim, Northern Ireland

Coordinates: 55.1202°N 6.05332°W

Knocknacarry: Irish: Cnoc na Caraidh / Cnoc na Cora
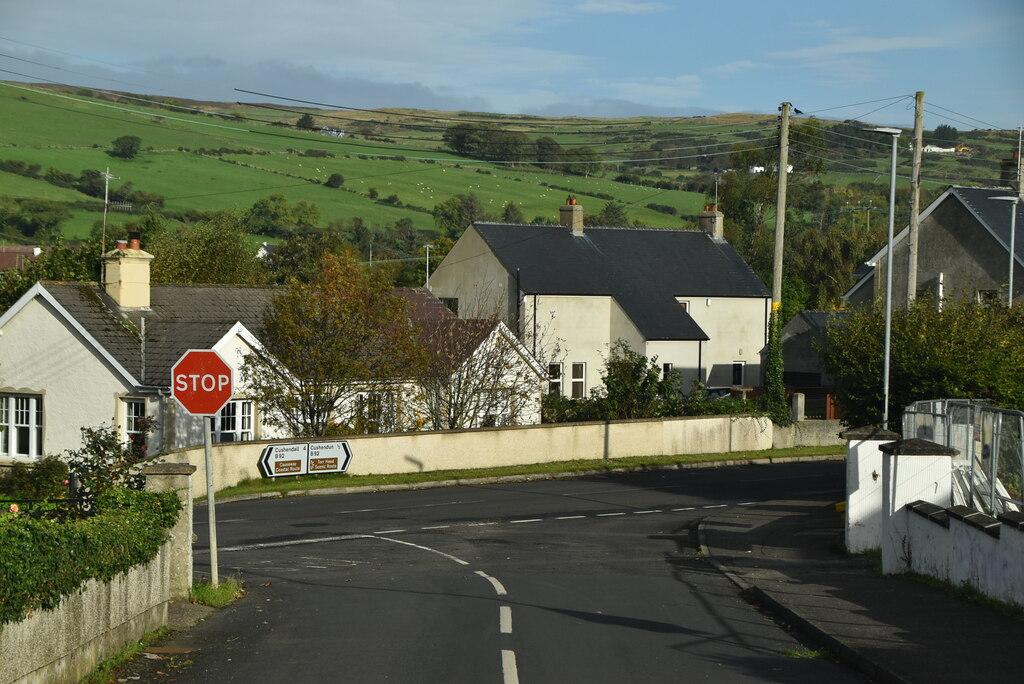
- Layde Road at the B92

- Location within Northern Ireland
- Population: 138 (2001 Census)
- District: Causeway Coast and Glens
- County: County Antrim
- Country: Northern Ireland
- Sovereign state: United Kingdom
- Post town: Ballymena
- Postcode district: BT44
- Dialling code: 028
- UK Parliament: North Antrim
- NI Assembly: North Antrim

Knocknacarry (/ˌnɒknəˈkjɑːri/ NOK-nə-KYAR-ee; from Irish Cnoc na Caraidh / Cnoc na Cora 'hill of the weir' – referring to a weir diverted off the River Dun which operated a watermill) is a hamlet and townland (of 155 acres) about 1 kilometre west of Cushendun and 17 kilometres south-east of Ballycastle in County Antrim, Northern Ireland. It is situated in the historic barony of Glenarm Lower and the civil parish of Layd. In the 2001 Census it had a population of 138 people. It is within the Causeway Coast and Glens Borough Council area.

Knocknacarry lies within the Antrim Coast and Glens Area of Outstanding Natural Beauty, designated in 1988. St. Ciaran's Primary School, which also serves the village of Cushendun and the wider local area, is in Knocknacarry.

The river bed of the River Dun at Knocknacarry Bridge, north of Knocknacarry, is of scientific interest in the field of mineralogy and an example of Cushendun Granite.

== See also ==
- List of villages in Northern Ireland
- Barmeen (a townland near Knocknacarry)
