= Pink purslane =

Pink purslane is a common name for several flowering plants, including:

- Claytonia sibirica, a plant native to Siberia and North America
- Calandrinia calyptrata, a plant native to Australia
- Portulaca pilosa, a plant native to parts of North, Central and South America
