= Cushendall =

Village in County Antrim, Northern Ireland

Coordinates: 55.082887°N 6.05896°W

Cushendall: Irish: Cois Abhann Dalla/Bun Abhann Dalla; Scots: Cushendall
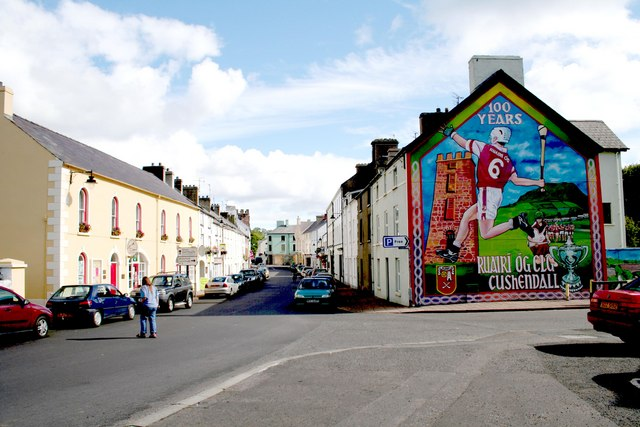
- Cushendall village with hurling mural

- Location within Northern Ireland
- Population: 1,180 (2021 census)
- District: Causeway Coast and Glens
- County: County Antrim
- Country: Northern Ireland
- Sovereign state: United Kingdom
- Post town: BALLYMENA
- Postcode district: BT44
- Dialling code: 028
- UK Parliament: North Antrim
- NI Assembly: North Antrim

Cushendall (from Irish Cois Abhann Dalla, meaning 'foot of the River Dall') is a coastal village and townland (of 153 acres) in County Antrim, Northern Ireland. It is located in the historic barony of Glenarm Lower and the civil parish of Layd, and is part of Causeway Coast and Glens district.

Located on the A2 coast road between Glenariff and Cushendun, Cushendall is in the Antrim Coast and Glens, an Area of Outstanding Natural Beauty. It lies in the shadow of the table topped Lurigethan Mountain and at the meeting point of three of the Glens of Antrim: Glenaan, Glenballyemon and Glencorp. This part of the Northern Irish coastline is separated from Scotland by the North Channel, with the Mull of Kintyre about 16 miles away. In the 2021 census, Cushendall had a population of 1,180 people.

Much of the historic character of the 19th-century settlement on the north bank of the River Dall remains, including the mostly-intact Irish Georgian buildings of the town's four original streets. In 1973, it was the second village in Northern Ireland to be designated as a Conservation Area. Since 1990, Cushendall has hosted the Heart Of The Glens festival every August. Thomas D'Arcy McGee, a father of Canadian Confederation, spent his childhood in Cushendall when his father, who worked for the Coast Guard Service, was posted there.

== History ==
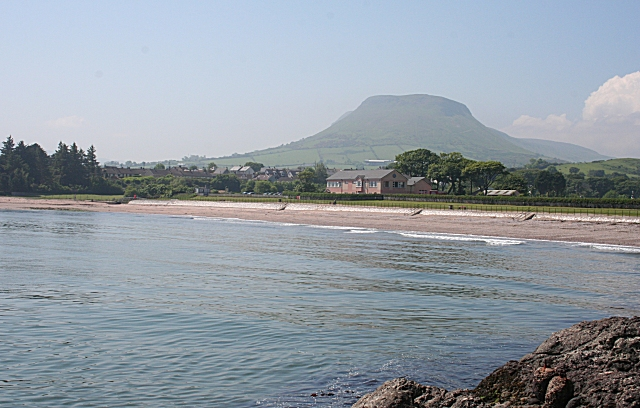
Cushendall Beach as seen from the Salmon Rocks, with Lurigethan in the background.

In the 17th century, Cushendall was called Newtownglens.

=== The Troubles ===
During The Troubles in Northern Ireland from 1970 to 1998, a shooting occurred in Cushendall. Several lorries of Ulster Special Constabulary (USC) personnel, accompanied by British Army soldiers, drove into Cushendall on the night of 23 June 1922 to enforce the nightly curfew. The USC proceeded to open fire on a crowd of onlookers, killing three Catholic men: James McAllister, John Gore and John Hill. After the incident, the USC claimed they were ambushed by the Irish Republican Army and returned fire, but a British government inquiry, which was declassified almost a century later, concluded that the constabulary's version of events was false.

There were further violent incidents during the Troubles of the late 20th century:

- Sergeant Joseph Campbell, a Catholic Royal Ulster Constabulary (RUC) officer, was shot dead on 25 February 1977 as he locked up the local police station. An RUC officer, Charles McCormick, was later acquitted of Campbell's murder and other charges including possession of explosives, firearms and armed robbery.
- RUC officer Alexander Bell died as a result of his injuries on 25 July 1989 from a previous Provisional Irish Republican Army (IRA) land mine attack on his patrol car.

== Places of interest ==
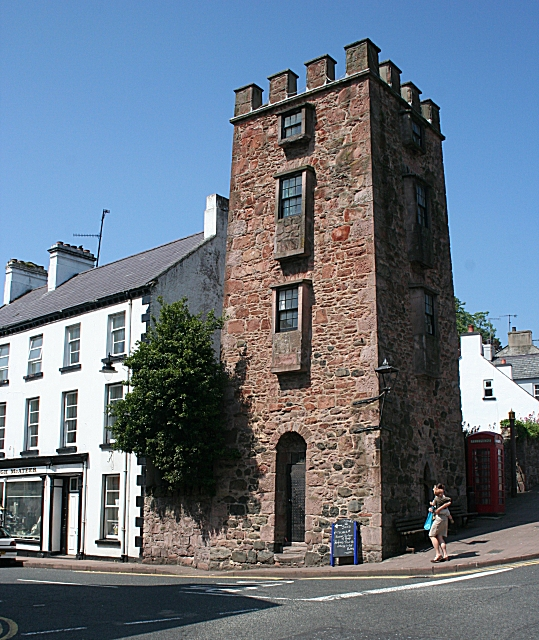
The Curfew Tower

=== Curfew Tower ===
The Curfew Tower in the centre of the village was built in 1817 to confine riotous prisoners by Francis Turnly — landlord of the town at the time. Dan McBride, an army pensioner, was given the job of permanent garrison and was armed with one musket, a bayonet, pistols and a thirteen-foot-long pike. The tower is now owned by Scottish musician and artist Bill Drummond.

=== Oisin's Grave ===
Oisín's Grave, off the main Cushendall to Ballymoney road, is a megalithic court cairn on a hillside in Lubitavish, near the Glenann River. It is believed to be the burial place of the Celtic warrior poet, Oisín, but it has been dated to be around 5000 years old and therefore predates his lifetime . A 16-foot-wide court opens into a gallery which is divided into two chambers. A stone cairn was erected on the site in 1989 in memory of John Hewitt, the poet of the Glens.

=== Layd Church and churchyard ===
The ruins of Layd Church, a Franciscan foundation possibly partially from the 13th century, are about 1.5 km north of Cushendall. They are also accessible by road and a cliff path from Cushendall. There are old vaults in the churchyard and it was one of the main burial places of the MacDonnells. There is a stone cross memorial to Dr James MacDonnell, one of the organisers of the last Belfast Festival of Harpists in 1792 and a pioneer of the use of chloroform in surgery. By the gate of the churchyard is a holestone and nearby two 'corp stones' on which coffins were rested. Layd Church saw service as a parish church from 1306 until about 1790.

=== Red Bay Castle ===
Red Bay Castle is situated between the villages of Cushendall and Waterfoot. Built by the Bisset family in the 14th century and later occupied by the MacDonnells, it was one of the outposts of the Kingdom of Dál Riata.

=== Glenariff Forest Park ===
Glenariff Forest Park, about 8 km inland from Cushendall, covers an area of 1185 hectares. The park contains waterfalls, forest trails, and riverside walks, including a café, toilets, and an exhibition centre. Four way-marked trails of varying length (1–9 km) wind through the forest leading walkers into some of the park's wooded areas.

== Demographics ==
Cushendall is classified as a village by the Northern Ireland Statistics and Research Agency (NISRA) (i.e., with a population between 1,000 and 2,499 people). On Census Day (27 March 2011) the usually resident population of Cushendall Settlement was 1,280, accounting for 0.07% of the NI total. Of these:

- 21.09% were under 16 years old and 14.84% were aged 65 and above;
- 49.69% of the population were male and 50.31% were female; and
- 92.11% were from a Catholic community background and 6.33% were from a 'Protestant and Other Christian (including Christian related)' community background.

== Sport ==
=== Hurling ===
The local hurling club, Ruairí Óg GAC, was founded in 1906 and plays its home matches at Páirc Mhuire in Cushendall. They became Ulster champions for the first time in the 1981-82 season, when the team beat Ballycastle Mc Quillans after a replay. As of 2022, the club had been Ulster champions 11 times (All Ireland Senior Club Hurling Championships). They reached the final of the All Ireland Senior Club Hurling Championships in the 2015-16 season, losing to Na Piarsaigh (Limerick) 2-25 to 2-14.

=== Sailing ===
Established in 1951, Cushendall Sailing & Boating Club (CSBC) is situated in Red Bay. CSBC has a sailing school which runs throughout the summer using RYA's learn-to-sail scheme. The school teaches all ages and abilities.

=== Other sports ===
On the second Saturday of August each year, during the Heart of the Glens Festival, the Lurig Run takes place. This is a 3.5 mile run consisting of a 1500 ft climb up the face of the Lurigethan mountain.

Cushendall Golf Club is a small nine-hole course located in a valley with the Abhainn Dala (River Dall) running through its centre.

== Tourism ==
Holiday accommodation in the area ranges from self-catering to bed & breakfast and caravan and camping. Cushendall has three caravan and camping sites. It has a number of shops, which offer local gifts and crafts, as well as many other items.

There is also an annual vintage car rally which is held in the village.

== In the media ==
In 2023 Cushendall was featured in an episode of Ben Robinson's BBC television series Villages by the Sea.
