= Glendun =

One of the nine Glens of Antrim in Northern Ireland

Coordinates: 55°06′27″N 6°08′17″W

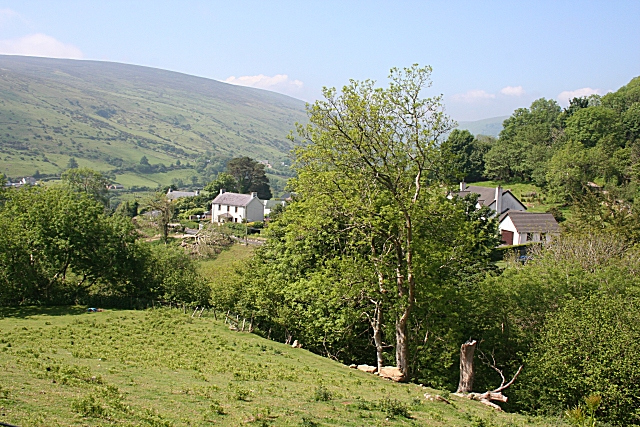
View of the glens of Antrim at Glendun

Glendun (in Irish: Gleann Abhann Duinne) translates into English as glen of the brown river and is one of the nine Glens of Antrim in County Antrim in Northern Ireland.

It is named after the River Dun which is coloured brown by the peat bogs at the river source.

Like all glens in that area, it was shaped during the Ice Age by giant glaciers.

The village of Cushendun and the hamlet of Knocknacarry both lie at the foot of the glen.
