= Waterfoot, County Antrim =

Village in County Antrim, Northern Ireland

Coordinates: 55.0604°N 6.0611°W

Waterfoot: Irish: Gleann Airimh; Glenariff
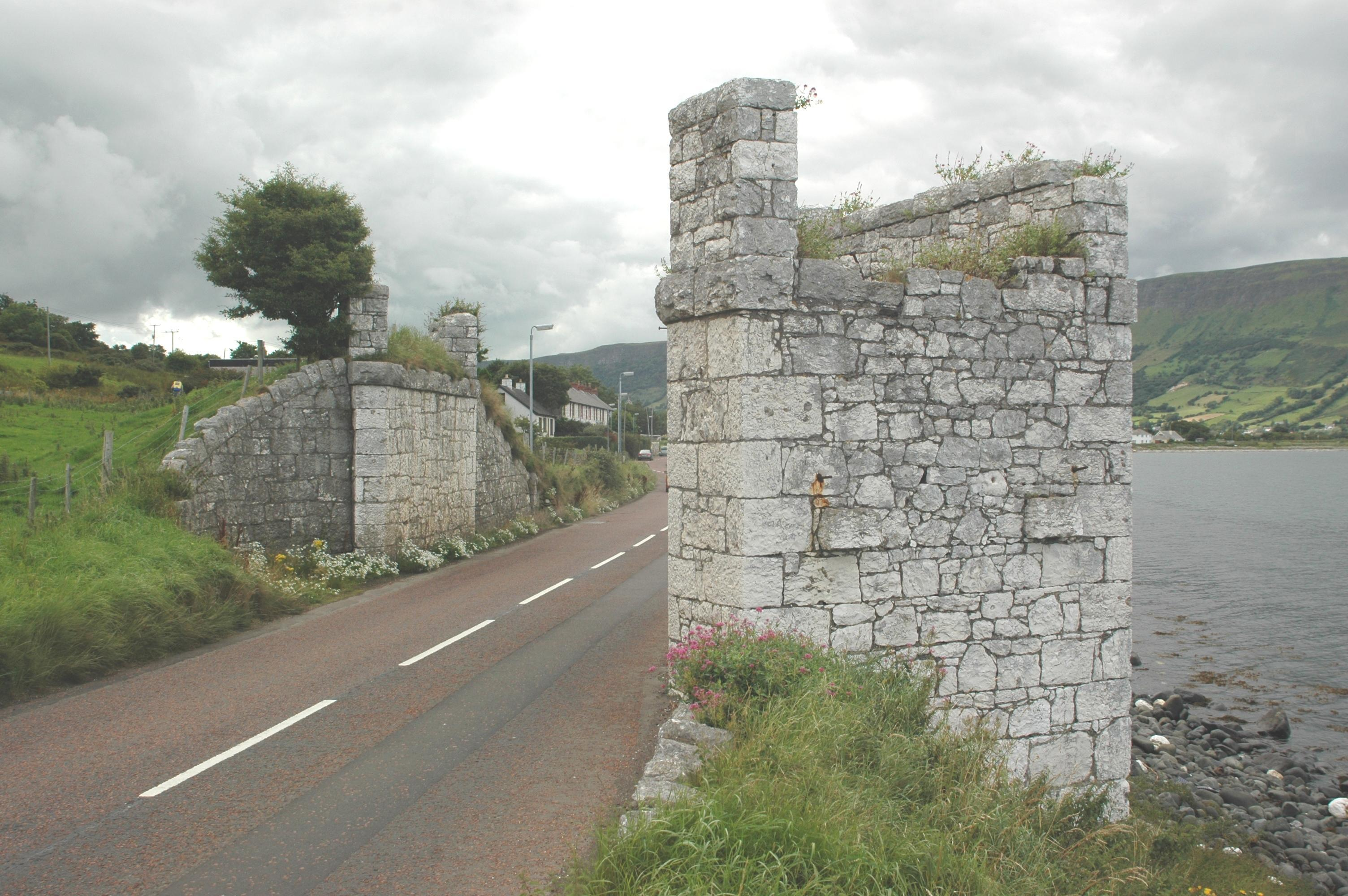
- White Arch with Glenariff in the background

- Location within Northern Ireland
- Population: 520 (2011 census)
- Irish grid reference: D240255
  - Belfast: 47 miles (76 km)
- District: Causeway Coast and Glens
- County: County Antrim
- Country: Northern Ireland
- Sovereign state: United Kingdom
- Post town: Ballymena
- Postcode district: BT44
- Dialling code: 028
- UK Parliament: North Antrim
- NI Assembly: North Antrim

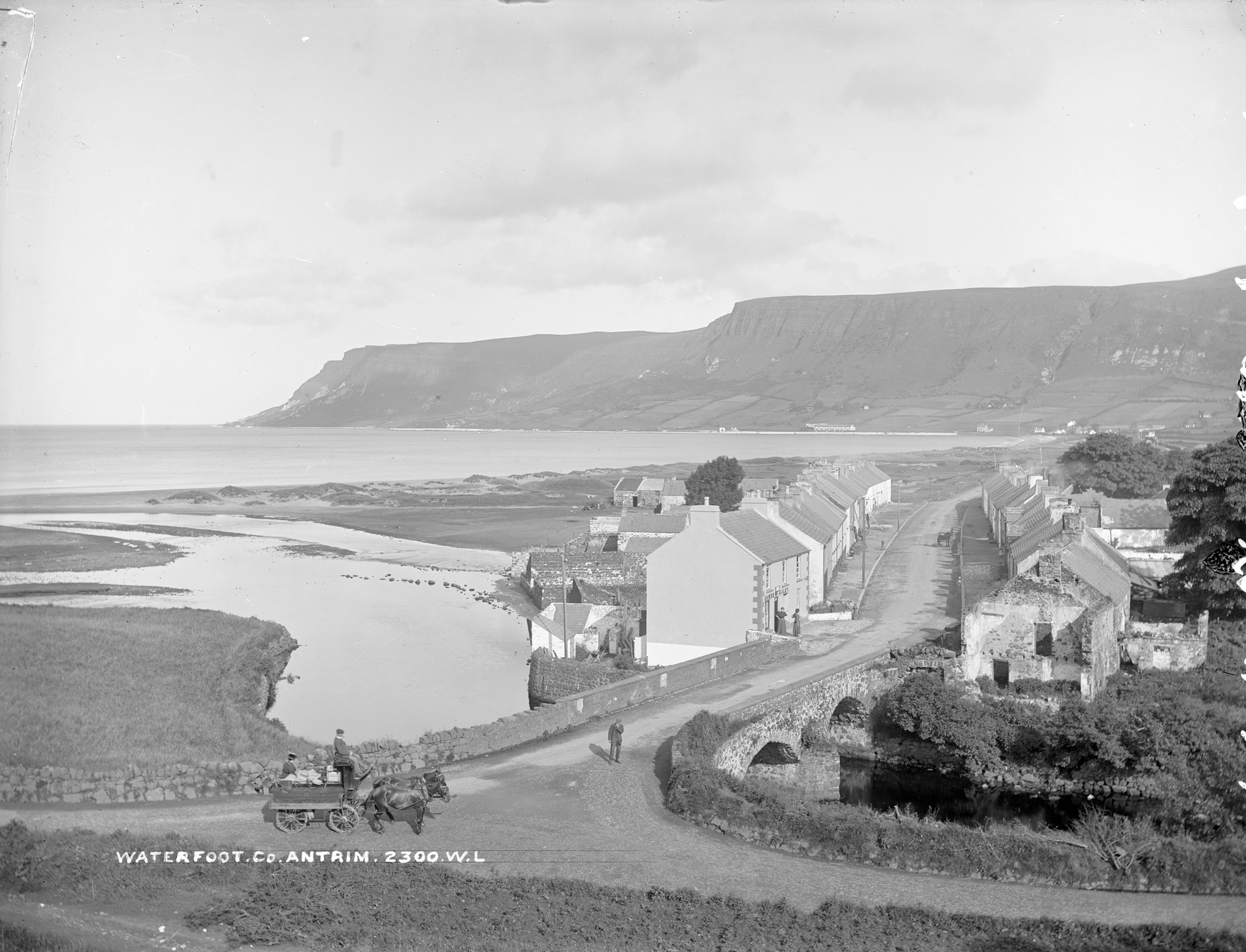
Waterfoot in the late 19th century

Waterfoot or Glenariff (from Irish Gleann Airimh 'glen of arable land') is a small coastal village in County Antrim, Northern Ireland. It is at the foot of Glenariff, one of the Glens of Antrim, within the historic barony of Glenarm Lower and the civil parishes of Ardclinis and Layd. The village is in the townland of Warren, 16 miles (26 km) north-east of Ballymena. The 2001 census recorded a population of 504 inhabitants.

The village appeared in the news in November 2010 when Peter Wilson, one of the "disappeared" of the Troubles, was found buried on its beach on 2 November 2010.

== Demographics ==
On census day in 2011, 27 March 2011, Waterfoot had a population of 520. Of these:

- 98.85% were from the white (including Irish Traveller) ethnic group;
- 94.62% belong to or were brought up in the Catholic religion and 4.42% belong to or were brought up in a 'Protestant and Other Christian (including Christian related)' religion; and
- 12.12% indicated that they had a British national identity, 58.65% had an Irish national identity and 31.73% had a Northern Irish national identity*.

== See also ==
- List of towns and villages in Northern Ireland
