= Glynrhonwy quarries =

Two adjacent former slate quarries in Carnarvonshire, Wales

Glynrhonwy
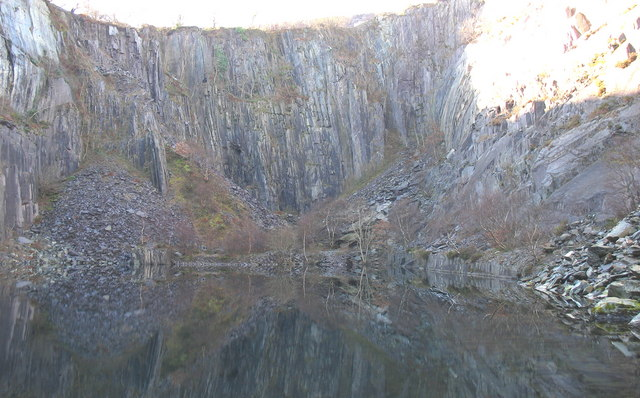
- The west wall of the upper pit of Lower Glynrhonwy Quarry

- Location in Gwynedd
- Location: near Llanberis, Carnarvonshire (now Gwynedd), Wales; 53°07′25″N 4°08′53″W SH 563 607
- Products: Slate
- Type: Quarry
- Opened: early 1700s
- Closed: 1930

The Glynrhonwy quarries (also known as the Glyn-Rhonwy quarries) were two adjacent quarries in the Glynrhonwy area, north-west of Llanberis, in Carnarvonshire (now Gwynedd), Wales.

They were:

- Upper Glynrhonwy quarry, known locally as "Glyn Ganol" or "Middle Glyn", which operated from 1861 to 1930, and
- Lower Glynrhonwy quarry, known locally as "Captain Taylor's Quarry", which operated from the early 1700s to 25 January 1930.

The quarries operated internal railways of 2 ft (610 mm) gauge and were served by Glynrhonwy Siding off the LNWR's Caernarfon to Llanberis branch.

Lower Glynrhonwy was acquired by the Air Ministry in 1939 for munitions storage. It occupied the site until 1961. During the Second World War the site generated two extra trains per day on some occasions. The railway siding was taken out of use on 18 December 1956.

A 100 MW pumped storage project, marketed as a "quarry battery", received approval in 2017 and as at 2019 had reached the "detailed engineering design" stage.
