= Parkmore railway station =

Railway station in County Antrim, Northern Ireland

Coordinates: 55.013974°N 6.146593°W

Parkmore.
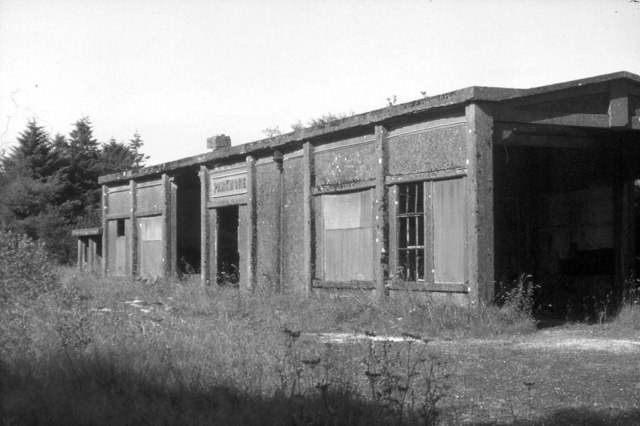
- Parkmore station in 1997

General information
- Location: Parkmore, County Antrim; Northern Ireland

Other information
- Status: Disused

History
- Original company: Ballymena, Cushendall and Red Bay Railway
- Pre-grouping: Ballymena, Cushendall and Red Bay Railway
- Post-grouping: Ballymena, Cushendall and Red Bay Railway

Key dates
- 1 September 1888: Station opens
- 1 October 1930: Station closes
Location

Parkmore railway station was on the Ballymena, Cushendall and Red Bay Railway which ran from Ballymena to Retreat in County Antrim, Northern Ireland.

== History ==
The station was on the Ballymena, Cushendall and Red Bay Railway route and opened by the Belfast and Northern Counties Railway on 1 July 1889, which had taken ownership in October 1884.

The station closed to passengers on 1 October 1930.

Preceding station	Historical railways	Following station
Cargan	Ballymena, Cushendall and Red Bay Railway; Ballymena-Retreat	Retreat
