= Glens of Antrim =

Series of valleys in County Antrim, Northern Ireland

Coordinates: 55°09′36″N 6°06′00″W

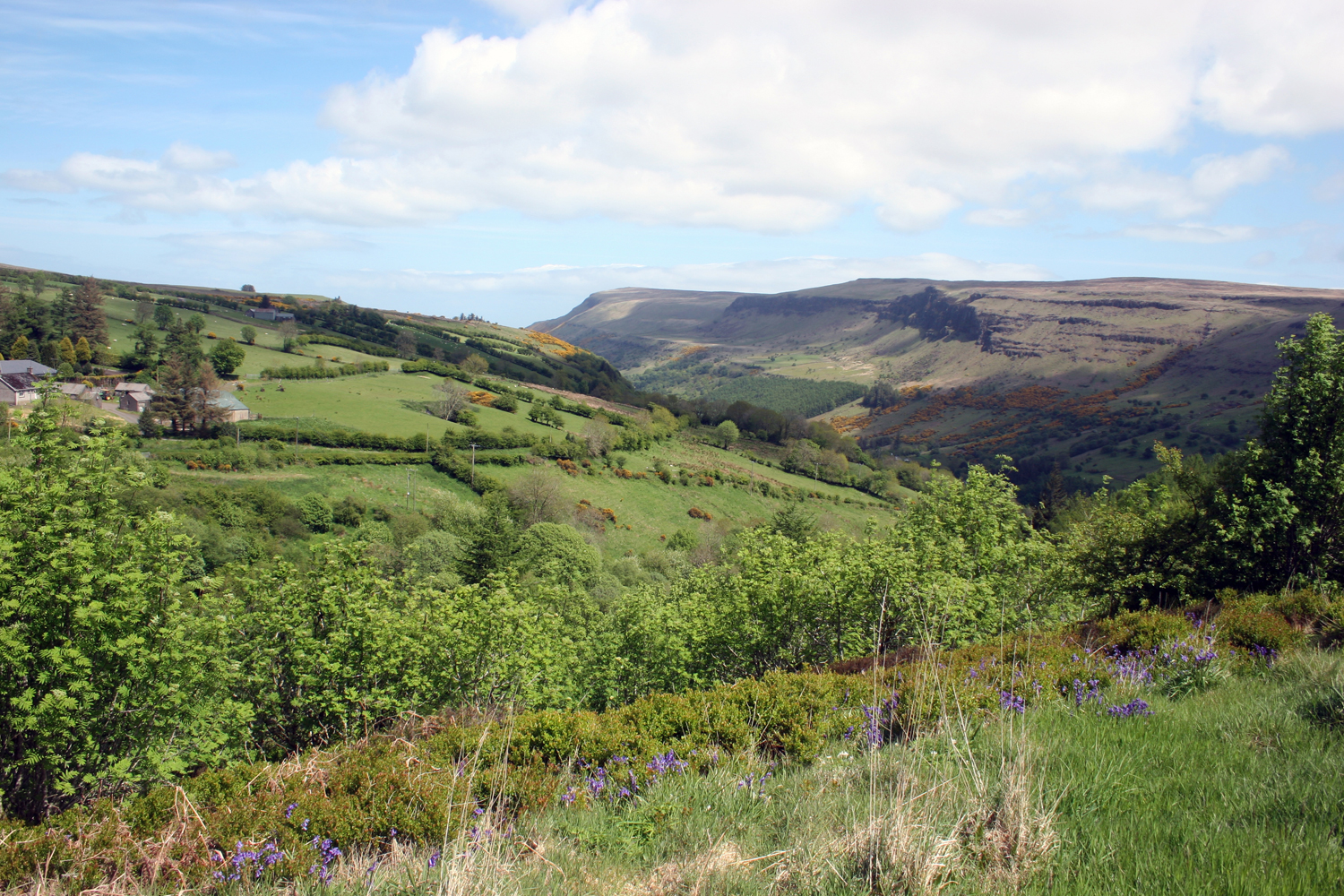
Glenariff

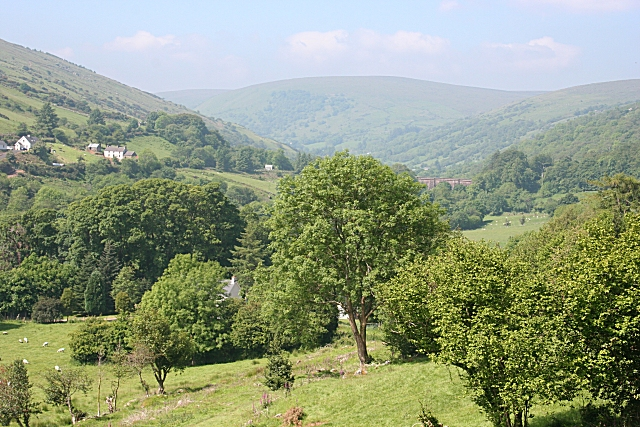
Glendun: the Glendun Viaduct can just be made out among the trees in the middle distance, and on the skyline is Crocknamoyle

The Glens of Antrim (Irish: Glinnte Aontroma), known locally as simply the Glens, is a region of County Antrim, Northern Ireland. It comprises nine glens that radiate from the Antrim Plateau to the coast. The glens are an area of outstanding natural beauty and are a major tourist attraction in north Antrim.

The main towns and villages in the Glens are Ballycastle, Cushendun, Cushendall, Waterfoot, Carnlough and Glenarm.

== The Lordship of the Glens ==
From the mid-13th century onward, the lordship of the Glens belonged to the Bissett family, Anglo-Norman in origin but Gaelicized over generations. With the marriage of John Mor Macdonald, second son of John of Islay, Lord of the Isles, to Margery Bisset in the late 14th century, the glens came into the ownership of the MacDonnells of Antrim. John Mor gained the title Lord of Dunyvaig and the Glens.

== The nine glens ==
From north to south, the nine glens are:

	Irish name	Meaning	Ref
Glentaisie	Gleann Taise	Taise's valley/damp valley	
Glenshesk	Gleann Seisc	barren valley	
Glendun	Gleann Doinne	valley of the [river] Dun	
Glencorp	Gleann Corp	valley of the body (or bodies)	
Glenaan	Gleann Athain	valley of the burial chamber	
Glenballyeamon	Gleann Bhaile Uí Dhíomáin; Gleann Bhaile Éamainn	valley of Ó Díomáin's town valley of Éamonn's town	
Glenariff	Gleann Aireamh	valley of the ploughman/arable valley	
Glencloy	Gleann Claidheamh	valley of the sword	
Glenarm	Gleann Arma	valley of the army	

== Tenth glen ==
Glenravel is sometimes referred to as a tenth glen by locals. It lies to the southwest of Glenballyeamon and Glenariff, being separated from the latter by the Glenariff forest park.

The main settlements of Glenravel are Cargan, Martinstown and Skerry (Newtowncrommelin).

== Archaeology ==
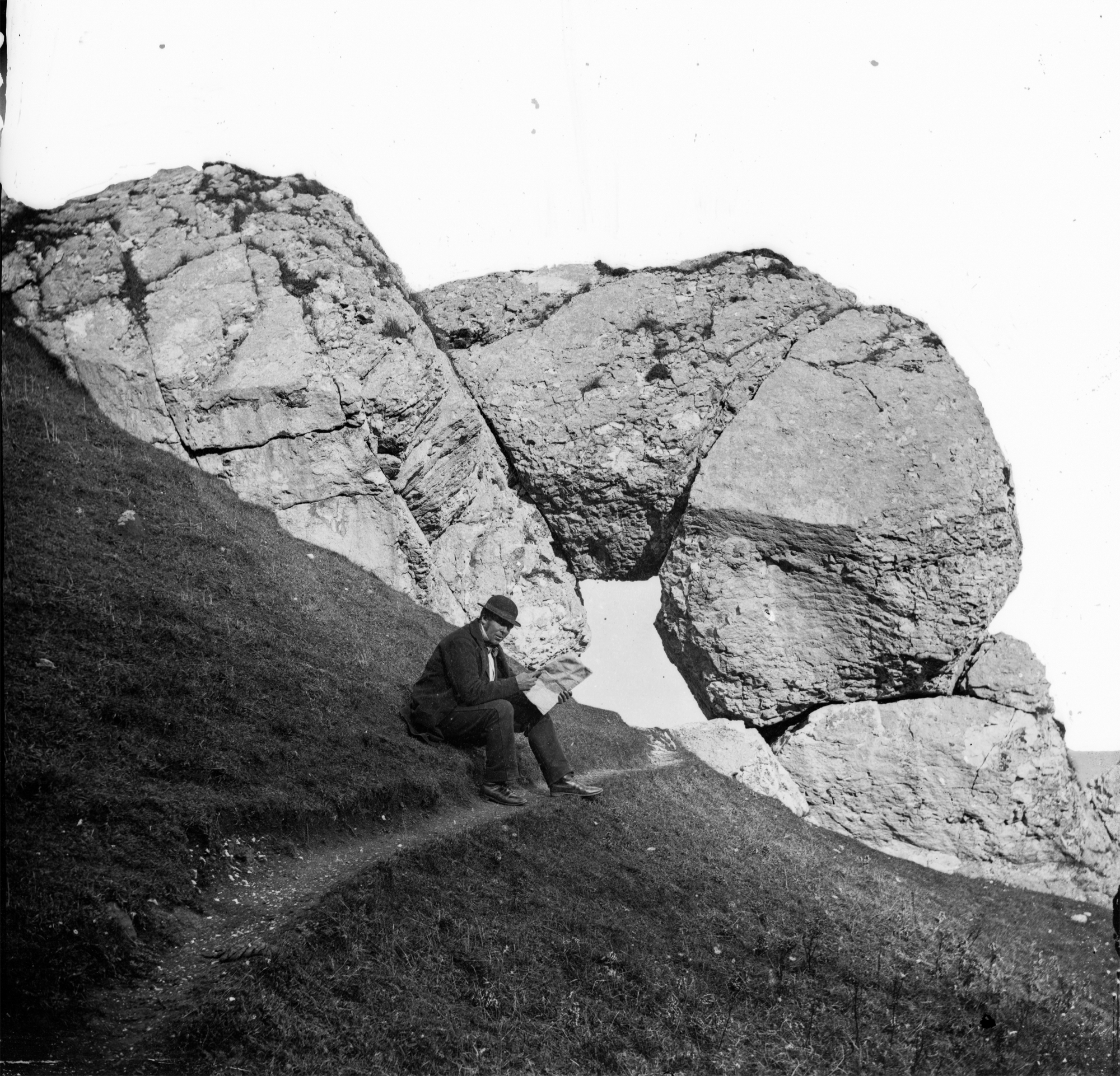
Madman's Window in Antrim, ca. 1860 (National Library of Ireland)

Artifacts of the Neolithic period have been found in various places of the Glens of Antrim including Bay Farm II and Madman's Window.

== In popular culture ==
- The Glens are mentioned in the song "Ireland's Call".
- DI Sean Duffy, in the Troubles mysteries by Adrian McKinty, is from the Glens.
- The song The Green Glens of Antrim was written by Kenneth North and has been recordedby artists such as The Wolfe Tones, Daniel O'Donnell and Paddy Reilly.

== See also ==
- Glens of Antrim Historical Society
