= Cushendun =

Village in County Antrim, Northern Ireland

Coordinates: 55.12526°N 6.04265°W

Cushendun: Irish: Bun Abhann Duinne; Scots: Cushenduin
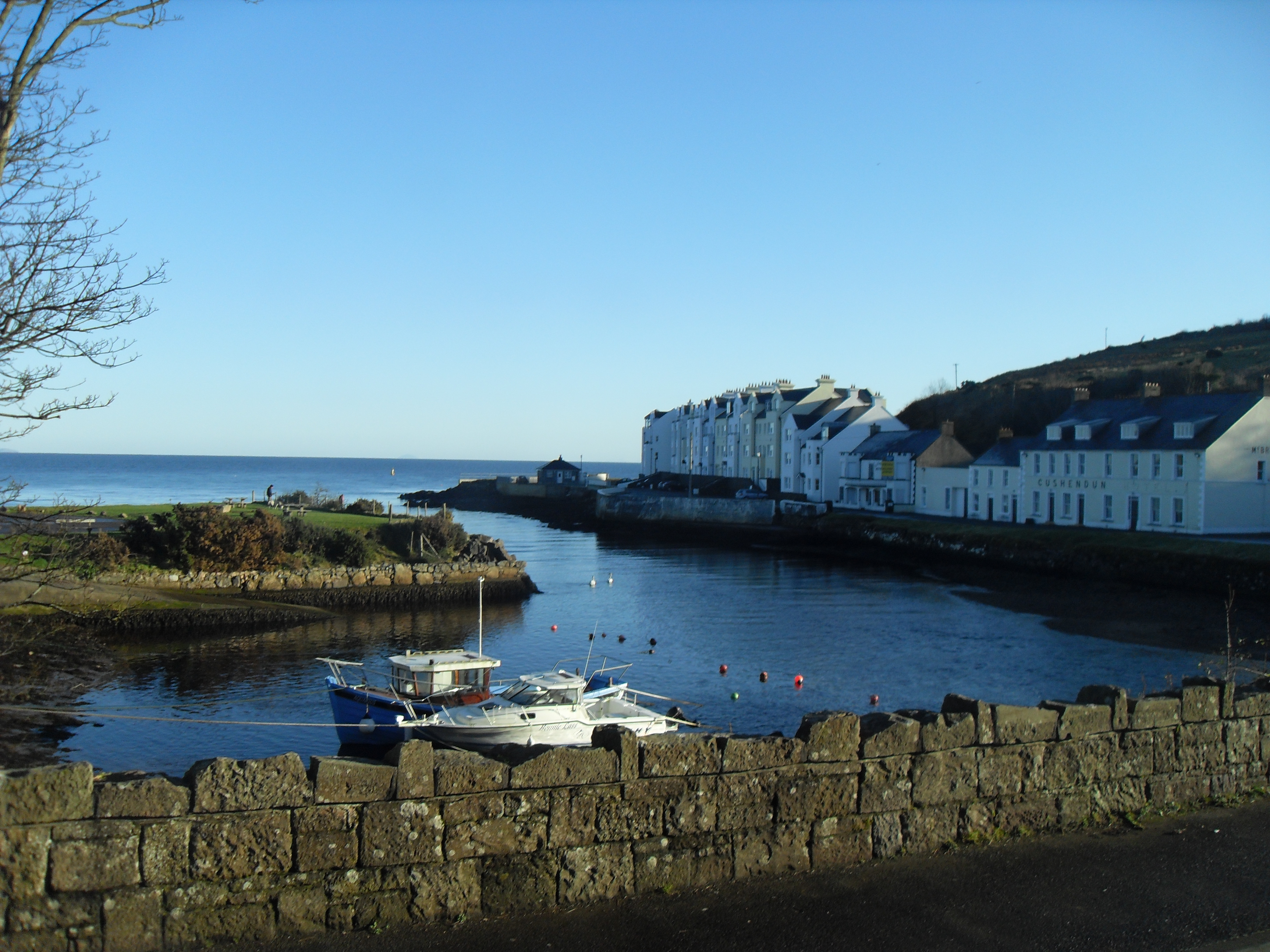

- Location within Northern Ireland
- Population: 115
- District: Causeway Coast and Glens
- County: County Antrim
- Country: Northern Ireland
- Sovereign state: United Kingdom
- Post town: Ballymena
- Postcode district: BT44
- Dialling code: 028
- UK Parliament: North Antrim
- NI Assembly: North Antrim

Cushendun (from Irish Cois Abhann Doinne, meaning 'foot of the River Dun') is a small coastal village in County Antrim, Northern Ireland. It sits off the A2 coast road between Cushendall and Ballycastle. It has a sheltered harbour and lies at the mouth of the River Dun and Glendun, one of the nine Glens of Antrim. The Mull of Kintyre in Scotland is only about 15 miles away across the North Channel and can be seen easily on clear days. In the 2021 census it had a population of 115 people. It is part of Causeway Coast and Glens district. The hamlet of Knocknacarry is nearby.

== History ==
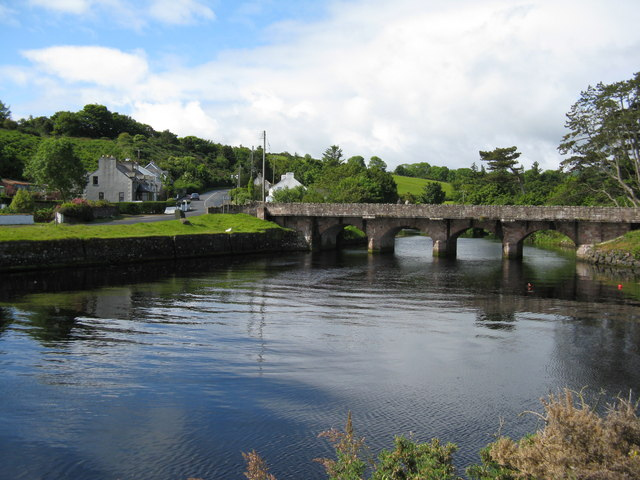
Cushendun Bridge

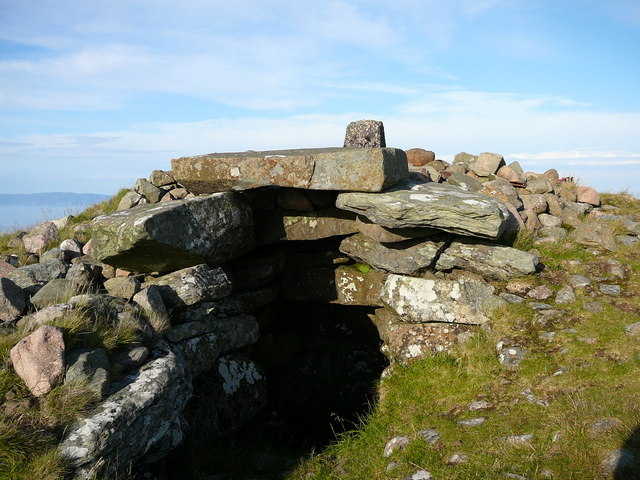
Chambered grave on Carnanmore

Four miles north of Cushendun is the Carnanmore passage cairn. This well-preserved cairn is located on a hilltop, is 75 feet in length and is visible is for miles. The chamber has a corbelled roof and is capped with a massive stone slab. Two stones are decorated with lozenges and spirals.

Cushendun is where Shane O'Neill, chief of the Tyrone O'Neill dynasty, was killed by the MacDonnells in 1567.

Cushendun village was designed for Ronald McNeill, the Conservative MP and author, later Lord Cushendun, in the style of a Cornish village by the architect Clough Williams-Ellis. He is buried in the Church of Ireland graveyard near his nationalist cousin Ada or Ide McNeill, Roger Casement's friend and admirer who died in 1959.

The National Trust has owned and cared for most of the village and the parkland around Glenmona House since 1954. Cushendun was designated as a conservation area in 1980, due to its architectural history and location within the Antrim Coast and Glens Area of Outstanding Natural Beauty.

In the early 21st century, the caves near Cushendun were used as backdrop in the TV series Game of Thrones.

== Sport ==
In 1904, the first Gaelic Athletic Association (GAA) club was founded in Cushendun. Originally known as the Brian Boru's, the club participated in the first Feis-na-nGleann in 1904 and, after defeating Glenarm, lost to Carey in the final of the “Shield of Heroes”. The club later became known as Robert Emmets GAC and, in 2004, celebrated its centenary.

During most of their existence, Cushendun has been a junior hurling club but on a few occasions has moved up to the senior ranks. In 1931, the club won the Antrim Senior Hurling Championship. Cushendun Emmets have also won the Antrim Intermediate Hurling Championship on three occasions: 1973, 1992 and 2007. The Junior Hurling Championship was also secured in 1963 and again in 2018, along with several Feis competitions and leagues. While primarily a hurling club, Cushendun Emmets has also intermittently fielded camogie and Gaelic football teams.

The club built a new pitch in 1967/68, and a new pavilion was officially opened by then president of the GAA Jack Boothman in 1995. A second floodlit pitch was added at Lig-na-Arigid Park in 1999.

== Notable people ==
- Moira O'Neill (pseudonym of Agnes Shakespear Higginson (1864–1955)), Irish-Canadian poet, lived across the bay from Cushendun at Rockport Lodge.
