= Martinstown, County Antrim =

Village in County Antrim, Northern Ireland

Coordinates: 54.964°N 6.225°W

Martinstown (Irish: Baile Uí Mháirtín) is a small village in County Antrim, Northern Ireland. Located 6 miles from Ballymena, it is situated in Glenravel, locally known as "The Tenth Glen", alongside the widely known nine Glens of Antrim.

It lies within the Mid and East Antrim Borough Council area. It had a population of 345 people (108 households) in the 2011 Census. (2001 Census: 285 people)

On 19 May 1922, the Irish Republican Army attacked Martinstown Royal Irish Constabulary barracks with gunfire and grenades, sparking a battle. They also ambushed a group of reinforcements, killing a Special Constable.

== Transport ==
- Knockanally railway station (now Martinstown) opened on 5 April 1886, closed for passenger traffic on 1 October 1930 and finally closed altogether on 12 April 1937. It was on the Ballymena, Cushendall and Red Bay Railway which operated narrow gauge railway services from Ballymena to Parkmore from 1875 to 1940.

== See also ==
- List of towns and villages in Northern Ireland
