= Glenariff =

Valley in County Antrim, Northern Ireland

Coordinates: 55°01′56″N 6°04′46″W

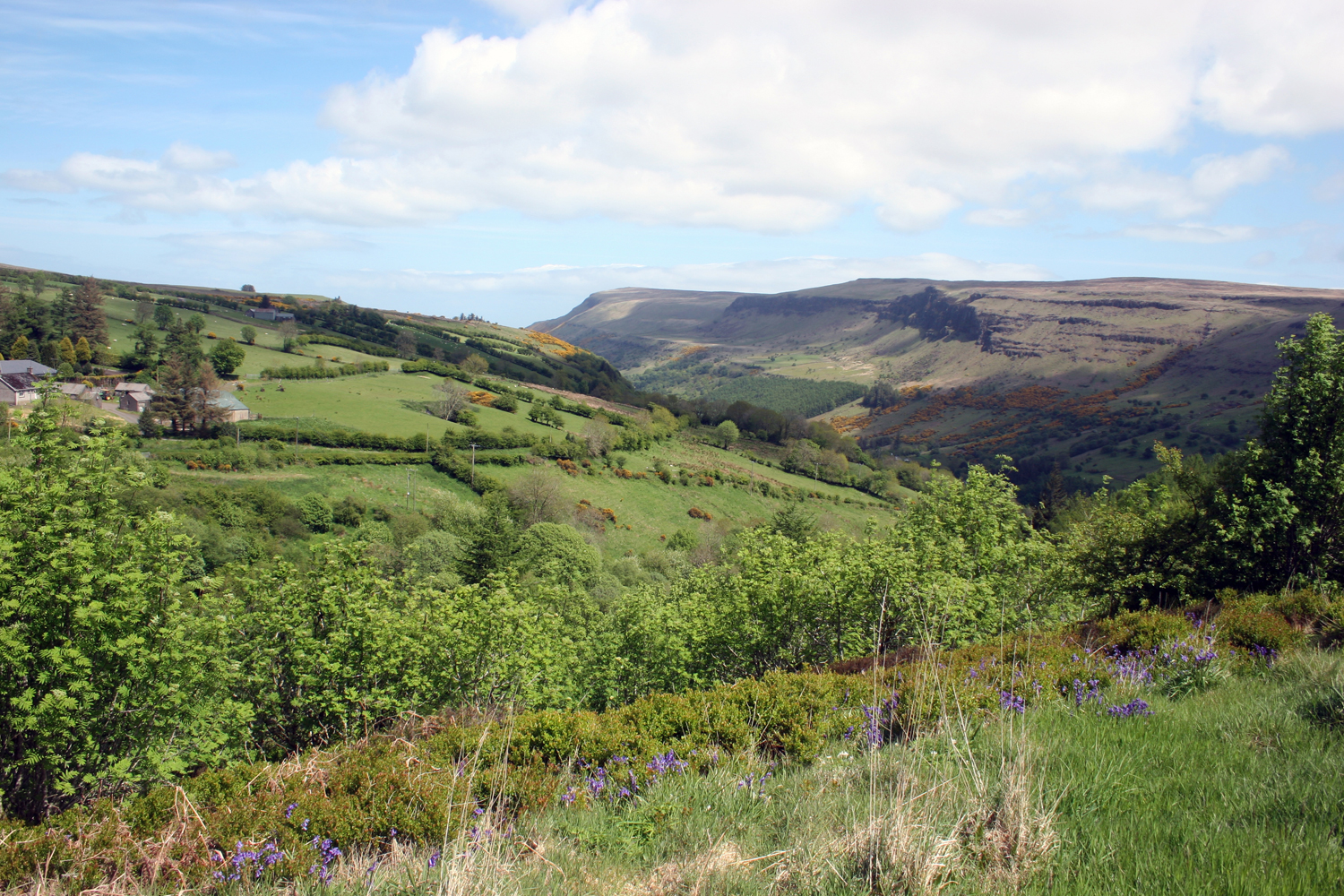
Glenariff

Glenariff or Glenariffe (from Irish Gleann Airimh, meaning 'valley of the ploughmen' or from Irish Gleann Aireamh, meaning 'arable valley') is a valley in County Antrim, Northern Ireland. It is one of the Glens of Antrim. Like other glens in that area, it was shaped during the Ice Age by giant glaciers.

It is sometimes called the 'Queen of the Glens', and is the biggest of the Glens of Antrim and visited by most tourists. The village of Waterfoot lies on the coast at the foot of the glen.

A popular tourist destination is the Glenariff Forest Park with its trails through the trees and alongside waterfalls.
