= Edward Cotton =

Edward Cotton may refer to:

- Edward Cotton (priest, died 1647), Archdeacon of Totnes
- Edward Cotton (priest, died 1675) (1616–1675), Archdeacon of Cornwall
- Edward John Cotton (1829–1899), English accountant and railway manager
- Ted Cotton (1929–2002), Australian cricketer
- Edward Cotton-Jodrell (1847–1917), known until 1890 as Edward Thomas Davenant Cotton, British Army officer and politician
