= Northern Counties Committee =

Railway in Northern Ireland (1903–1949)

- Lines owned and worked by NCC; Line owned by NCC but worked by County Donegal Railways Joint Committee (CDRJC); CDRJC lines jointly owned with Great Northern Railway (Ireland)
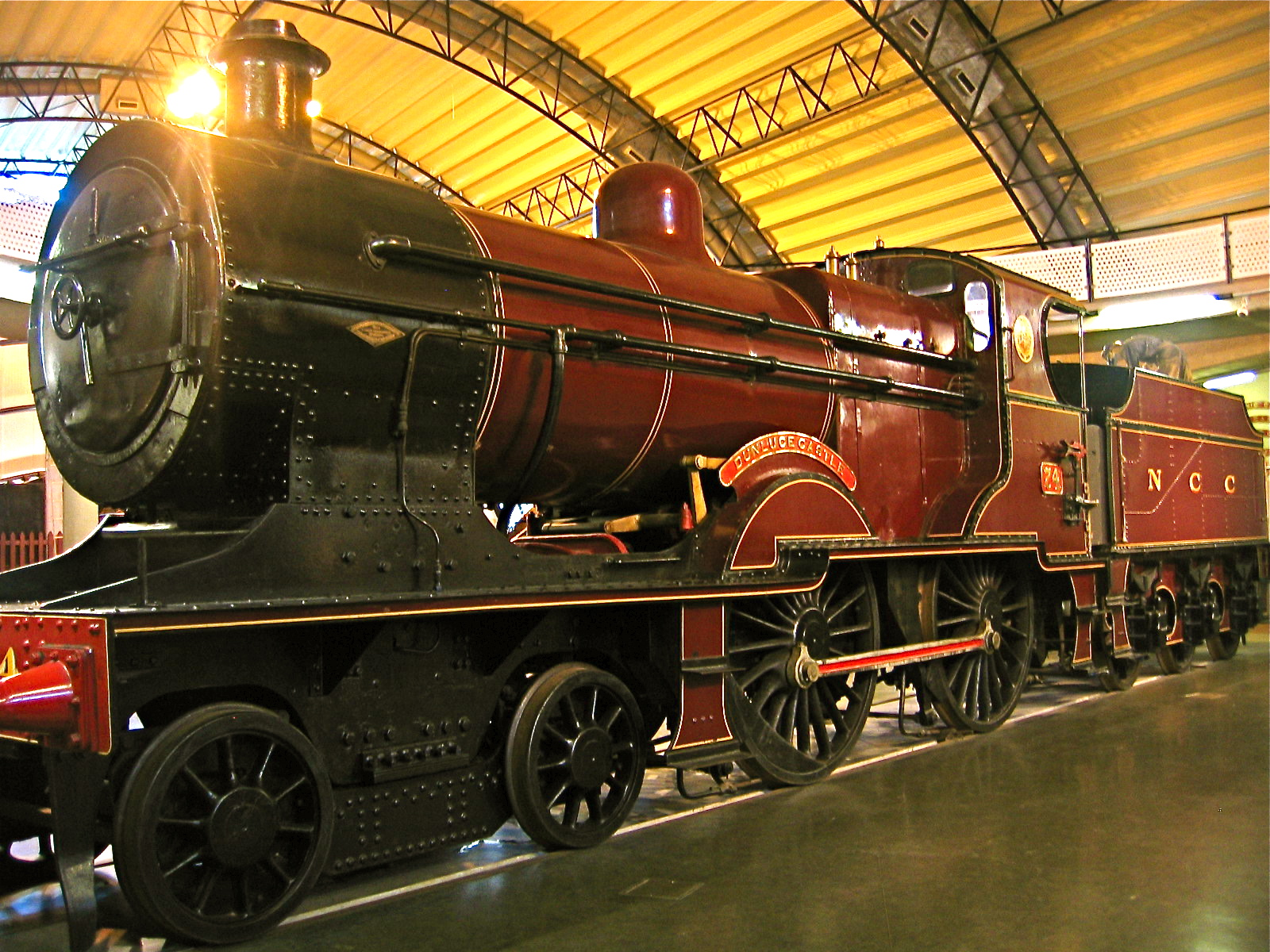
- Class U2 74 Dunluce Castle at the Ulster Folk and Transport Museum, Cultra

Overview
- Dates of operation: 1903–1949
- Predecessors: List of prior companies: Belfast and Ballymena Railway (1848–1859); Ballymena, Colraine and Portrush Railway (1855-1861); Londonderry and Colraine Railway (1852-1871); Ballymena, Cushendall and Redbay Railway (1875-1884); Ballymena and Larne Railway (1877-1889); Carrickfergus and Larne Railway (1862-1890); Draperstown Railway (1883-1895); Portstewart Tramway (1882-1897); Derry Central Railway (1880-1901); Belfast and Northern Counties Railway (1860–1902); Limavady and Dungiven Railway (1883-1907); Donegal Railway (Derry to Strabane section) (1900-1906); Ballycastle Railway (1880-1924)
- Successor: Ulster Transport Authority

Technical
- Track gauge: 5 ft 3 in (1,600 mm); 3 ft (914 mm)
- Length: 281 miles 17 chains (452.6 km) (1925)
- Track length: 388 miles 2 chains (624.5 km) (1925)

The Northern Counties Committee (NCC) was a railway that served the north-east of Ireland. It was built to Irish gauge (1,600 mm (5 ft 3 in)) but later acquired a number of 914 mm (3 ft) narrow gauge lines. It had its origins in the Belfast and Ballymena Railway which opened to traffic on 11 April 1848.

The NCC itself was formed on 1 July 1903 as the result of the Midland Railway of England taking over the Belfast and Northern Counties Railway (BNCR), which the Belfast and Ballymena Railway had become. At the 1923 Grouping of British railway companies, the Committee became part of the London, Midland and Scottish Railway (LMS). After the nationalisation of Britain's railways in 1948 the NCC was briefly part of the British Transport Commission, which sold it to the Ulster Transport Authority (UTA) in 1949.

The BNCR and its successors recognised the potential value of tourism and were influential in its development throughout Northern Ireland. They were able to develop and exploit the advantages of the Larne to Stranraer ferry route between Northern Ireland and Scotland which gained importance in World War II.

== Belfast and Ballymena Railway ==
=== Proposals ===
There had been a proposal by the Davison brothers of Ballymena to build a railway between Belfast and Ballymena in 1836 but this came to nothing due, firstly, to the inability to identify a suitable route out of Belfast that did not include excessive gradients and, secondly, an economic downturn.

However, in 1844, the same promoters, in association with Sinclair Mulholland, William Coates and John McNeile of Belfast drew up a new scheme that included a branch to Carrickfergus. Charles Lanyon was employed to carry out preliminary surveys of the proposed route.

In fact, two routes out of Belfast were surveyed. One was an inland route beginning at the Antrim Road and skirting Cavehill. The other started at the junction of York Road and Corporation Street; it ran north on an embankment across slob land on the western shore of Belfast Lough. To ease the gradient, it was necessary for the line to Ballymena to leave the Carrickfergus branch by means of a trailing junction 6 1/2 miles (10.5 km) from Belfast. Lanyon strongly favoured this latter coastal route and reported accordingly at a public meeting in Antrim courthouse on 20 May 1844. A motion was carried that a complete survey of the line was to be completed and that costs were to be defrayed by opening a subscription.

A prospectus was issued in September 1844 with an optimistic review of the financial prospects for the undertaking. There was a good response and capital accumulated steadily from both sides of the Irish Sea. By 1848, the Belfast and Ballymena Railway (B&BR) would have 221 shareholders.

=== Parliamentary approval ===
Belfast and Ballymena Railway Act 1845
- Act of Parliament
- Parliament of the United Kingdom
- Long title: An Act for making a Railway from Belfast to Ballymena in the County of Antrim, with Branches to Carrickfergus and Randalstown.
- Citation: 8 & 9 Vict. c. lxxxi

Dates
- Royal assent: 21 July 1845

The next stage was to obtain parliamentary approval for the B&BR's original line plus a branch to Randalstown. A bill was duly lodged and came before a committee of the House of Commons in April 1845. Clauses were inserted at the Belfast Harbour Commissioners' request to protect them from possible competition from the harbour at Carrickfergus. The promoters were able to assuage the committee's fears that the works would be heavy and costly and the bill received royal assent on 21 July 1845 as the Belfast and Ballymena Railway Act 1845 (8 & 9 Vict. c. lxxxi), "An Act for making a Railway from Belfast to Ballymena in the County of Antrim, with Branches to Carrickfergus and Randalstown".

=== Building the line ===
Lanyon immediately began preparations for building the line and placed advertisements for tenders for the construction of the railway. The contract was awarded to William Dargan. Orders were placed for rails and sleepers and locomotives were ordered from Bury, Curtis and Kennedy.

Meanwhile, the directors were recruiting staff. A secretary was appointed in 1845, Ellis Rowland was appointed locomotive superintendent in 1847 and Thomas Houseman Higgin became manager in May 1848.

By the spring of 1847, portions of the line were ready for ballasting and, as neither Dargan nor the B&BR had any locomotives, a second-hand engine was obtained from the Ulster Railway to carry out the work. While it had been hoped to open the line in November 1847, this was put back by the need to raise the embankment along the shore of Belfast Lough.

Stations were built along the main line and the Carrickfergus branch. The most impressive was that at Belfast where Lanyon used his architectural talents to create an imposing classical design.

==== Board of Trade inspections ====
Eventually the line was deemed to be ready for inspection by the Board of Trade on 10 January 1848. Captain Robert Michael Laffan RE carried out the inspection and issued an unfavourable report dated 3 March. He was much concerned that the permanent way was very roughly laid and unballasted in places; neither were there any signals. Furthermore, he deemed that a bridge had been constructed in a hasty manner with the result that, when tested, it exhibited very great deflection. Other defects included poor drainage in cuttings and a lack of mileposts. Captain Laffan's opinion was that it was therefore unsafe to allow the line to be opened.

Lanyon and Dargan were keen to retrieve their reputations and there was a period of furious activity as they worked to correct deficiencies identified in the Board of Trade report. The directors carried out their own inspection of the line on 6 April and felt sufficiently confident about what they had seen to ask Captain Laffan to make a second inspection. This he did and his report of 8 April was more encouraging than the previous one. Although there were some strictures, Captain Henry Drury Harness RE, secretary to the Railway Department of the Board of Trade formally advised the directors of the B&BR on 14 April that the railway could be opened for public service. However, authorisation had been sent previously by telegraph and the railway was already at work.

=== The line opens ===
As soon as the Board of Trade's telegraphic authority had been received, advertisements were placed in the newspapers on 8 April 1848 to inform the public that the B&BR would be open for passenger traffic on 12 April. Because of the delay in starting operations, it was decided not to have an official opening ceremony. However, two special trains ran on 11 April to give members of the press and potential customers a foretaste of railway travel and the railway was in business.

The normal train service was five trains each way with the Carrickfergus Junction (later renamed Greenisland)-Carrickfergus and Drumsough Junction-Randalstown lines being considered as branches. All main line trains had to reverse at Carrickfergus Junction because of the trailing connection there. This was to be an operating problem for years to come.

Because the goods sheds were still incomplete, it was not possible to run goods trains at first but some articles were accepted for carriage by passenger train.

==== Early accounts ====
The financial results for the first year of operation were very poor due to depressed passenger traffic during the winter season and because of the Great Famine of Ireland with the result that no dividend was paid. Goods traffic increased once the goods sheds and other facilities had been completed and, in an attempt to obtain additional passenger traffic, the company reduced second and third class fares. However, the financial situation remained unsatisfactory throughout the early years and no dividend would be declared until 1850–51 when it was possible to pay a modest dividend of 1%.

Dividends continued at around 1-1 1/2% until November 1855 when they rose to a new peak of 5%. Goods traffic had continued to increase gratifyingly although passenger numbers fluctuated.

=== Cookstown extension ===
Belfast and Ballymena Extension Railway Act 1853
- Act of Parliament
- Parliament of the United Kingdom
- Long title: An Act to enable the Belfast and Ballymena Railway Company to make a Railway from Randalstown to Cookstown; and for other Purposes.
- Citation: 16 & 17 Vict. c. lxviii

Dates
- Royal assent: 28 June 1853

Text of statute as originally enacted

Terminating at a small country town, the Randalstown branch was not generating as much traffic as the directors wished. Therefore, it was decided to extend the line to Cookstown. The act of Parliament for this extension, the Belfast and Ballymena Extension Railway Act 1853 (16 & 17 Vict. c. lxviii) became law on 28 June 1853. After a delay to acquire land and raise capital, William Dargan was awarded the contract for building the line and began work in March 1855.

The Cookstown extension included two massive engineering features. One was the eight-span masonry bridge which carried the line fifty feet above the River Main just outside Randalstown and the other, a few miles further on, was a lattice bridge with a swing section across the River Bann near its outflow from Lough Neagh. Nevertheless, Dargan was able to carry out the work on the Cookstown extension speedily and the line was deemed to be ready for a Board of Trade inspection on 13 October 1856.

Captain H. W. Tyler RE, the inspecting officer, reported that although there was much that was satisfactory, the presence of an unauthorised level crossing prevented his allowing the line to be opened. Eventually, following correspondence between the directors and the Board of Trade, permission was given to open the line on condition that a bridge replaced the crossing within six months. The line was officially opened on 16 October 1856 but public services did not begin until 10 November. Four trains ran in each direction on weekdays and two on Sundays.

=== Excursion traffic ===
Cheap travelling facilities were offered from the earliest days of the railway. Special trains were run from Ballymena and intermediate stations in connection with Queen Victoria's visit to Belfast in August 1849. Later that year, day excursion tickets were available from Belfast to Randalstown for those who wished to visit Shane's Castle demesne at about two-thirds of the cost of normal tickets. Cheap tickets were also available for those travelling to Belfast; in 1857, passengers from Cookstown were being urged to experience the view from Cave Hill.

By 1859, further reductions were available for parties of eight or more travelling to destinations such as Shane's Castle, Masserene Park, Toomebridge, Moyola Park, the Giant's Causeway and Dunluce Castle. As always, the seaside was a popular destination with excursion tickets to Portstewart and Portrush via the neighbouring Belfast, Ballymena, Coleraine and Portrush Junction Railway (BBC&PJR) and valid for seven days being offered at normal single fare rates.

=== A lack of capital and a change of name ===
The B&BR continued to prosper but lacked capital and matters came to a head at when it was reported that the capital was totally expended and borrowing powers had been exceeded by £10,000. It was essential that the company raise additional funds to double the existing single line out of Belfast, as it was no longer adequate for the current volume of traffic and to replace many of the original wooden stations. It was therefore proposed to make a submission to Parliament as soon as possible.

Ballymena and Portrush Railway Act 1858
- Act of Parliament
- Parliament of the United Kingdom
- Long title: An Act to enable the Ballymena, Ballymoney, Coleraine, and Portrush Junction Railway Company to sell their Undertaking to the Belfast and Ballymena Railway Company.
- Citation: 21 & 22 Vict. c. liii

Dates
- Royal assent: 28 June 1858

In 1858, with the connivance of the B&BR, the neighbouring BBC&PJR promoted the Ballymena and Portrush Railway Act 1858 (21 & 22 Vict. c. liii) to empower the B&BR to purchase the BBC&PJR at a future date. The sum required was to be paid for by the issue of new shares. This manoeuvre was aided by the links both companies had with William Dargan.

Ballymena and Portrush Railway (Coleraine Junction) Act 1859
- Act of Parliament
- Parliament of the United Kingdom
- Long title: An Act to enable the Ballymena, Ballymoney, Coleraine and Portrush Junction Railway Company to make n Junction Railway at Coleraine.
- Citation: 22 Vict. c. xxxi

Dates
- Royal assent: 19 April 1859

However, a complication arose when the BBC&PJR was granted approval in the Ballymena and Portrush Railway (Coleraine Junction) Act 1859 (22 Vict. c. xxxi) in April 1859 to build a bridge over the River Bann at Coleraine to connect with the Londonderry and Coleraine Railway. Since this was after the 1858 act, the bridge could not be included in any sale of the BBC&PJR. The Belfast and Northern Counties Railway Act 1860 had to regularise the situation. In addition, this act made provision to change the title of the B&BR and to alter the dates of the half-yearly meetings.

When the last half-yearly accounts ending in March 1860 were issued, it was possible to declare a dividend of 4%.

Belfast and Northern Counties Railway Act 1860
- Act of Parliament
- Parliament of the United Kingdom
- Long title: An Act for altering the Name of "The Belfast and Ballymena Railway Company" to the Name of "The Belfast and Northern Counties Railway Company;" for increasing their Capital; and for other Purposes.
- Citation: 23 & 24 Vict. c. xlvi

Dates
- Royal assent: 15 May 1860

Text of statute as originally enacted

With the passage of the Belfast and Northern Counties Railway Act 1860 (23 & 24 Vict. c. xlvi) on 15 May 1860, the Belfast and Ballymena Railway ceased to exist and the Belfast and Northern Counties Railway (BNCR) took its place.

== Belfast and Northern Counties Railway ==
Belfast and Northern Counties Railways Act 1890
- Act of Parliament
- Parliament of the United Kingdom
- Long title: An Act for conferring further Powers on the Belfast and Northern Counties Railway Company and for amalgamating with their Undertaking the Undertaking of the Carrickfergus and Larne Railway Company; and for other purposes.
- Citation: 53 & 54 Vict. c. xxiii

Dates
- Royal assent: 22 May 1890

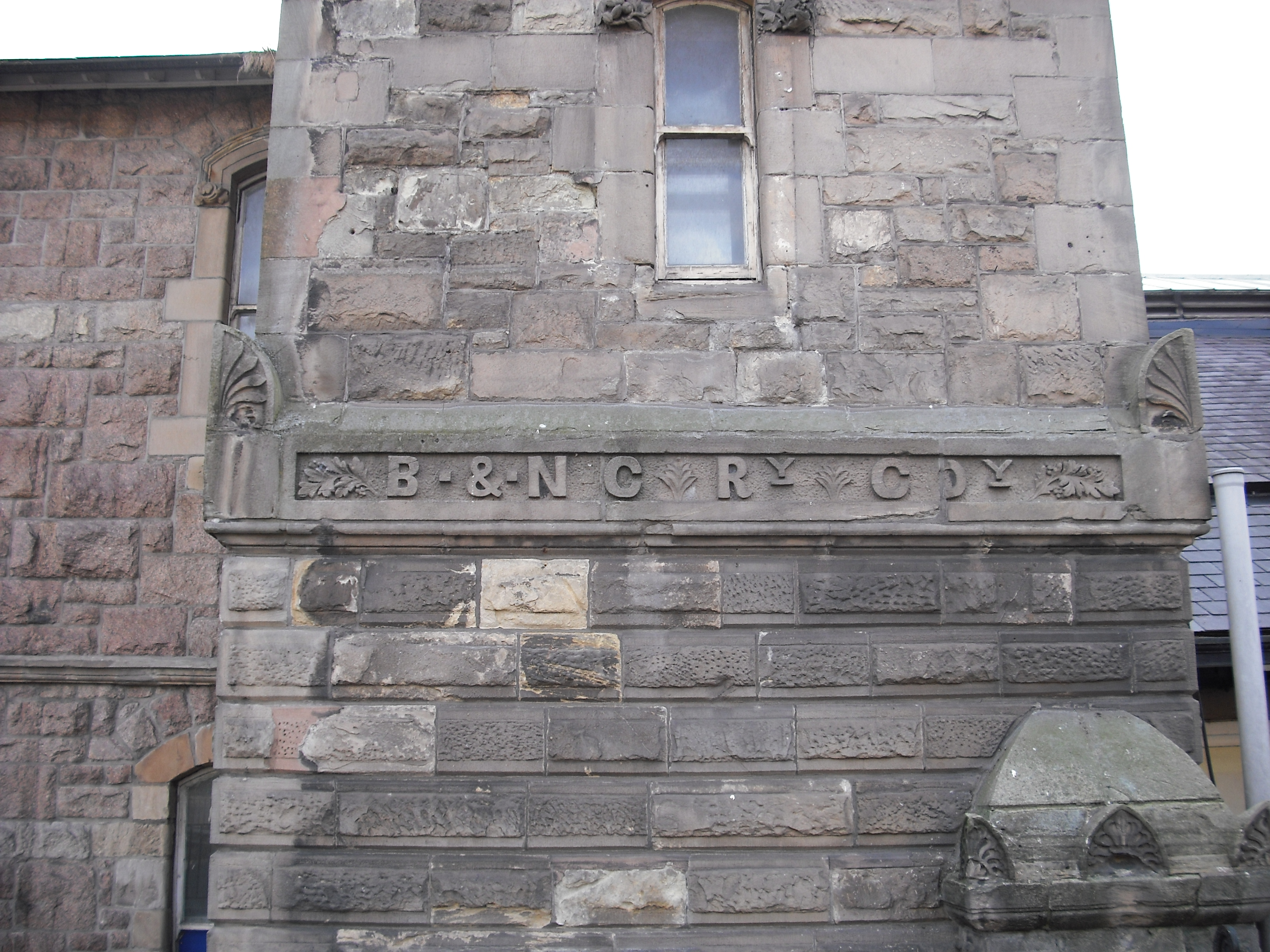
B & N C Railway Co. name, at Derry

On 15 May 1860 the Belfast and Ballymena Railway became known as the Belfast and Northern Counties Railway (BNCR), a title it would retain until amalgamation with the Midland Railway in 1903. The change of name was authorised by the Belfast and Northern Counties Railways Act 1860.

The following independent railways became part of the BNCR after its incorporation (opening date(s)/amalgamation date):

- Ballymena, Ballymoney, Coleraine and Portrush Junction Railway (November 1855/January 1861)
- Londonderry and Coleraine Railway (December 1852 and July 1853/July 1871)
- Ballymena, Cushendall and Red Bay Railway (1875 & 1876/October 1884)
- Ballymena and Larne Railway (August 1877, June & August 1878/July 1889)
- Carrickfergus and Larne Railway (October 1862/July 1890)
- Draperstown Railway (July 1883/July 1895)
- Derry Central Railway (29 miles (47 km)) (February 1880/September 1901)
- Portstewart Tramway (June 1882/June 1897)

Edward John Cotton had succeeded Thomas H. Higgin as manager of the B&BR in 1857 and continued in this position with the BNCR. He would be instrumental in making it the most prosperous railway in Ireland. Berkeley Deane Wise was the Chief Civil Engineer of the BNCR from 1888 to 1906. During those 18 years Wise made an immense contribution to the BNCR, designing many of its grand stations and tourist attractions.

=== Steamer services ===
The shortest distance between Great Britain and Ireland is the 22 miles (35 km) across the North Channel between Portpatrick in Wigtownshire, Scotland and Donaghadee in County Down. A privately run mail service had started in 1662 which. taken over by the Post Office and then the Admiralty, continued for nearly 200 years. In 1849, problems at both Portpatrick and Donaghadee during severe weather and the difficulty in accommodating larger steamers at Portpatrick caused the termini of the Short Sea Route to be transferred to Stranraer and Larne.

Even before the Carrickfergus & Larne railway (C&LR) had been completed, the BNCR was playing a leading role in discussions with other railway companies about operating a steamer service between Larne and Stranraer. The BNCR, Glasgow and South Western, Portpatrick, North British and Newcastle and Carlisle railways formed a joint committee to operate a steamer. It purchased the iron-hulled paddle steamer Briton which made her first sailing in normal service on 2 October 1862. The service was not a success and continuing poor financial results led to its being suspended on 31 December 1863.

Meanwhile, the BNCR continued to promote the possibility of a steamer service but with a better ship. Although lacking capital it was able to encourage private investors to set up a new company in 1871. Known as the Larne and Stranraer Steam Boat Company it began operating the PS Princess Louise on a daily service from 1 July 1872.

In 1885, the London and North Western, Midland, Caledonian and Glasgow and South Western railways had formed the Portpatrick and Wigtownshire Joint Railway to operate the Portpatrick Railway and to, improve the profitability of the route, bought out the steamship company. A new, faster and larger ship, the Princess Victoria entered service in May 1890 and reduced the sea crossing to only 2 1/4 hours. The new service was an immediate success and was well patronised by businessmen. Furthermore, the Postmaster General recognised the crossing as a supplementary mail route in addition to Holyhead-Kingstown. Traffic increased by 40% between 1875 and 1885 and in July 1891 an additional ship was put on the service during the summer. The BNCR had subscribed a large sum in 1890 and in July 1893 it was able to join the four railways operating the Portpatrick Joint Railway in the newly created Larne & Stranraer Steamship Joint Committee. Edward John Cotton of the BNCR managed the service which continued to be a success.

Once the BNCR had absorbed the Ballymena and Larne Railway in 1889 and the Carrickfergus and Larne Railway in 1890, it possessed both of the Irish routes leading to the Larne-Stranraer steamer.

=== Tourism ===
Whilst tourism in Ireland was not a new development, it was in the last quarter of the nineteenth century that a great increase occurred with large numbers of tourists making the sea crossing from Great Britain to see the delights of Ireland's scenery. The railways saw that it would be to their advantage to encourage tourist development since this would bring them increased traffic. On the BNCR, its manager, Edward John Cotton, especially recognised the potential value of tourism and was influential in its development throughout the North of Ireland.

The BNCR was able to exploit the advantages of the Larne-Stranraer short sea route with its benefit of a daylight crossing in the summer months and the ease with which passengers could transfer to trains alongside the steamer berth at Larne Harbour.

==== Excursions and special attractions ====
The BNCR continued the B&BR's practice of running cheap excursions. Besides excursions organised by the company itself, there were extensive summer programmes of special trains operated on behalf of outside organisations especially Sunday schools and other church organisations. A large number of special trains were chartered by Loyalist organisations around the "Twelfth of July" and the "Twelfth of August".

G. L. Baillie, the golfing pioneer, organised golfing excursions that included first class train fare and hotel accommodation to Portrush and Newcastle as well as to the County Donegal links at Rosapenna, Portsalon and Lisfannon.

The Giant's Causeway became an even greater tourist attraction with the opening of the Giant's Causeway, Portrush and Bush Valley Electric Tramway all the way to the Causeway in 1887. Thousands of tourists found the journey from outside Portrush railway station much quicker and easier than before and, being the world's first hydro-electric tramway, it was an attraction in itself.

Another of Ulster's celebrated tourist attractions is the Antrim Coast Road that stretches north from Larne to Ballycastle and Portrush and from which may be seen the Nine Glens of Antrim. The largest and arguably the most beautiful of these is Glenariff which stretches from Parkmore down to the sea. The opening of the Cushendall line to passengers created whole new possibilities for tourism. The BNCR leased Glenariff from the landlords and laid out a series of paths and bridges to make it easily accessible to tourists. Rustic shelters were provided near the water falls to protect visitors from the spray and, in 1891, a "tea house" was built which, as well as providing refreshments, included a dark room for the use of photographers.

Coastal scenery of a different kind may be seen in the Islandmagee area near Whitehead. While there was already some provision for tourists, the BNCR's civil engineer Berkeley Deane Wise constructed a new promenade and imported sand from Portrush to make a beach. In 1892 he also engineered a cliff path was engineered that stretched 1 1/4 miles from Whitehead to the Blackhead promontory. The lower sections bordered the shore but blasting and cantilevering from the cliffs was necessary higher up.

Further north from Whitehead on the eastern coast of Islandmagee is a region of high basalt cliffs known as the Gobbins. Here too, Wise set to work building a path. Steps were cut to connect the various levels, bridges were thrown across ravines including two tubular bridges that connected the "Man o'War Stack" to the main path. The first section of the path opened in August 1902 but it was to prove too expensive to continue to Heddle's Port as originally planned.

==== Hotels ====
Hotel accommodation in nineteenth century Ireland was not of a generally high standard. While this should have been of concern to the railway companies, few took a direct interest in the matter. The BNCR and the Great Southern & Western Railway were exceptions.

The BNCR purchased a share in the lease of the long-standing and well thought of Antrim Arms hotel at Portrush and in 1883 formed a separate company to manage what was renamed the Northern Counties Hotel. Situated on an elevated site, the hotel overlooked the Atlantic Ocean at front and back. With more than one hundred rooms, it was intended to accommodate high-class tourists visiting the Giant's Causeway. The hotel was enlarged and improved in 1884 and 1892 and in 1902 the BNCR purchased the freehold outright from the Earl of Antrim.

A new hotel was built in Belfast as part of the York Road station reconstruction with the intention of capturing trade from long-distance travellers as it was convenient to the cross-channel steamer berths. Designed by Berkeley Dean Wise and directly connected to the station, the unimaginatively named Station Hotel opened in 1898.

In addition to the railway-operated hotels, arrangements were made during the 1890s with the independent Olderfleet hotel in Larne and the Antrim Arms and Marine hotels in Ballycastle for the issue of combined railway and hotel tickets.

==== The Holden train ====
The Holden train was a new concept in Irish tourism. In 1902, A. W. Holden, a Larne hotelier who had hired trains from the BNCR for his summer tours, approached the railway to provide him with a special train. York Road works built the all first class four-car train. Three of the coaches were saloons and the fourth was a restaurant car, all being furnished to a high standard. They were bogie vehicles with corridor connections; the lower body panels were finished in match boarding and the end doors were recessed in the manner of Pullman cars. Two six-wheel vans were fitted with corridor connections to work with the train.

The train entered service in 1903 shortly before the end of the BNCR's independent career. Based at the Laharna Hotel, Larne, Holden's tour visited most of the popular tourist attractions in north-eastern Ireland over a six-day period. During this time, it covered some 400 miles (640 km) of railway travel and a further 40 miles (64 km) by road. The tours ran until the outbreak of World War I.

=== Accidents ===
The early years of the company were relatively free from serious incidents but as traffic increased and the system became busier, weaknesses in less than adequate operating procedures were exposed and a number of accidents occurred. Board of Trade inspectors investigated these and reported on the causes and recommended appropriate corrective actions.

The injury rates were low but sadly there were some fatalities which are mentioned in the list below.

- 9 February 1863. The coupling between two carriages of a Ballymena to Belfast train broke and a first class coach fell on it side but fortunately did not drag other vehicles with it. Two passengers were injured.
- 3 April 1863. A pointsman at Coleraine turned a down train into the up loop where it collided with engine of an up train
- 2 October 1876. A stopping train from Belfast to Ballymena derailed on a crossover at Cookstown Junction. Major General C. S. Hutchinson RE investigated the accident and blamed the system of wire interlocking in use at the junction.
- 26 December 1876. The 08.35 Coleraine to Belfast passenger train and 08.15 down goods collided head-on at Moylena near Antrim. One passenger was killed and eight others were injured. Colonel Frederick Rich RE investigated and, finding fault with the company's method of working the single line by the fixed timetable system, recommended adopting the train staff system until the line was doubled.
- 23 December 1878. Wagons ran away while a mixed train was shunting at Duncrue siding near Carrickfergus.
- 28 September 1887. An up train derailed just on the Londonderry side of the Bann Bridge at Coleraine. During his investigation, Colonel Rich found that the track was old and the ballast to be of poor quality. He commented on the lack of timber baulks on the bridge itself that would prevent a derailed train from falling in the river and also criticised the signalling arrangements at the bridge which the company revised shortly afterwards.
- 27 February 1892. A ballast train from Limavady ran into the back of the 07.00 Londonderry to Belfast passenger train at Castlerock. There were no injuries. Major General Hutchinson found fault with personnel at Downhill and Castlerock for signalling irregularities. The passenger train had been running late due to poor steaming because the brick arch in its firebox had collapsed some days previously and General Hutchinson censured the driver for not reporting the collapse.
- 25 August 1894. A stopping train from Larne Harbour to Belfast derailed on a section of track that was being relaid shortly after leaving Whitehead. A 10 mph (16 km/h) speed restriction should have been imposed but the permanent way gang carrying out the work had failed to post warning signs and had left the track in a dangerous condition. Fortunately the derailed vehicles remained upright as they passed through Whitehead tunnel otherwise the consequences could have been much more serious.
- 7 August 1897. The firebox collapsed on 2-4-0 locomotive No.58, killing both locomotive men on the approach to Antrim station. Major F.A. Marindin RE found that the procedure for inspecting locomotive boilers was inadequate and a more rigorous regime was put in place.
- 13 July 1898. The 09.55 Belfast to Larne passenger train overran signals at Larne Town station and collided with a train of empty coaches causing extensive damage to both trains. Lieutenant Colonel George Addison RE found that lapses routinely occurred in working the block system and signals. Shortly afterwards, Larne Town station was completely resignalled and the Larne Town-Larne Harbour section was equipped with tablet instruments.
- 10 October 1900. The 16.00 train from Kilrea to Coleraine was completely derailed a little over a mile to the south of Coleraine station but fortunately there were no injuries. Major J.W. Pringle RE determined that the cause was excessive speed over old iron rails aggravated by the rigidity of the double-framed locomotive, No.22. The completion of the track relaying programme was put in hand immediately.
- 25 September 1902. A special troop train from Ballincollig, County Cork to Larne Harbour became divided. The detached rear portion subsequently collided with that in front between Greenisland and Trooperslane. Four vehicles were destroyed and many others damaged; three cavalry horses were killed but there were no other injuries. Major Pringle felt that the locomotive crew had not been sufficiently vigilant in keeping a proper lookout. Furthermore, he censured the Great Southern and Western Railway, the GNR(I) and the BNCR, over whose metals the train had run, for treating it as goods or cattle and marshalling the passenger vehicles behind the non-braked cattle wagons with the result that the vacuum brake was not in operation throughout the train.

=== Amalgamation ===
The Midland Railway had invested heavily in new harbour facilities at Heysham and was anxious that its influence in Ulster would not end at Donegall Quay in Belfast. To extend its activity in Ireland it decided to purchase an interest in a large Irish railway. The BNCR was an efficient, prosperous company and well suited the Midland's purposes; it connected the two largest cities in the north of Ireland and had direct links to County Donegal. The Midland made a very tempting offer which the BNCR's directors advised the shareholders to accept. This was also agreed by the Midland's shareholders.

Midland Railway (Belfast and Northern Counties Railway Purchase) Act 1903
- Act of Parliament
- Parliament of the United Kingdom
- Long title: An Act to provide for the vesting of the undertaking of the Belfast and Northern Counties Railway Company in the Midland Railway Company.
- Citation: 3 Edw. 7. c. cxxvii

Dates
- Royal assent: 21 July 1903

Text of statute as originally enacted

The date of vesting was set for 1 July 1903 and on 21 July 1903, the act of Parliament necessary for amalgamation passed into law as the Midland Railway (Belfast and Northern Counties Railway Purchase) Act 1903 (3 Edw. 7. c. cxxvii). Thus ended the separate existence of the railway that was affectionately nicknamed "Big Nancy Coming Running". Henceforth, the BNCR would be known as the Midland Railway (Northern Counties Committee).

== Midland Railway (Northern Counties Committee) ==
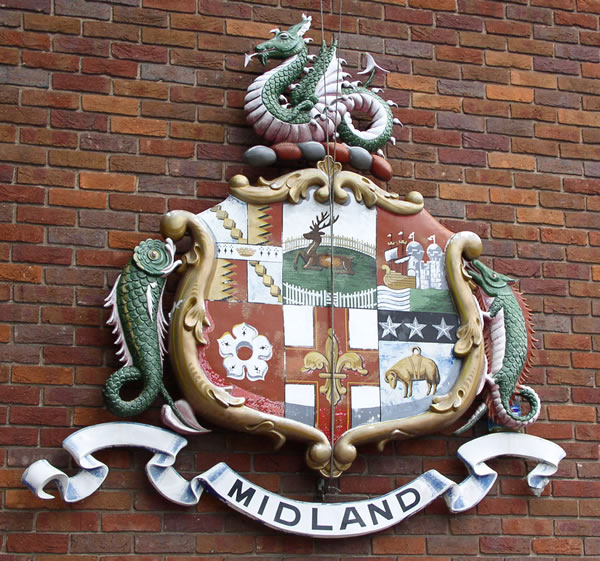
Midland Railway coat of arms.

The amalgamation of the BNCR with the Midland Railway took place on 1 July 1903. The railway retained a great deal of autonomy and was run by a management committee based in Belfast – the Northern Counties Committee (NCC). Locomotive and rolling stock liveries remained very much as they had been under the BNCR except for the adoption of the Midland Railway coat of arms and NCC monogram.

The following railways became part of the MR(NCC) (opening date(s)/amalgamation date):

- County Donegal Railways Joint Committee Londonderry and Strabane section, formerly part of the narrow gauge Donegal Railway (14.25 miles; 22.93 km) was vested in the MR (NCC) in May 1906.
- Limavady and Dungiven Railway (10.75 miles; 17.30 km) (July 1883/February 1907).

Total mileage in 1911 was 263.25 miles (423.66 km)

Two steam railmotors were obtained from Derby and entered service in 1905. Originally proposed for Belfast suburban services, the traffic department put them to work on Belfast-Ballymena stopping services. Hauling vans and horseboxes, they soon became worn out and were withdrawn in 1913.

Meanwhile, valuable iron ore traffic was obtained in 1907. Iron ore had been transported by road from the mines near Parkmore to Waterfoot for shipment but the poor condition of the roads was making this impossible. The traffic was put on rail via Ballymena to Larne Harbour, 100 new wagons and two new locomotives were built to handle the 35 000 tons of ore that was to be transported annually.

The NCC purchased two Thornycroft motor char-a-bancs in 1905 and hired a third for at least one season. One was used to take guests at the Northern Counties Hotel on trips to the Giant's Causeway and other tourist attractions while the second provided a service between Parkmore, Glenariff Glen and Cushendall. The hired vehicle was used on tours of the Antrim Coast Road.

=== Statistics – 1910 ===
- In 1910 the Committee owned 79 locomotives; 364 passenger train vehicles; two railmotor cars; and 2328 goods vehicles
- Locomotives were painted "invisible green" (a very dark bronze green that looked almost black) picked out with yellow, blue and vermilion lining; passenger rolling stock, lake, picked out with gold and vermilion lining.
- The Portstewart Tramway owned 3 locomotives and four other vehicles
- The Committee owned three hotels: Midland Station Hotel, Belfast; Northern Counties Hotel, Portrush; and Laharna Hotel, Larne

All details in this section are from Railway Year Book 1912 (Railway Publishing Company)

=== Tourism ===
The NCC continued the BNCR's policy of encouraging tourism.

The Belfast hotel, now known as the Midland Station Hotel continued to prosper and additional bedrooms were added in 1905. In 1906 additional accommodation was added to the rear of the Northern Counties Hotel at Portrush. The work increased the number of rooms to 150 and provided a splendid new ballroom. The NCC acquired a third hotel, the Laharna Hotel at Larne, from the Holden company in 1909 and with it the Holden train.

Glenariff continued to be a popular tourist destination and Sunday trains were run on the Cushendall line during summer to meet public demand.

The Gobbins cliff path on Islandmagee had not been completed in BNCR days. While it had been intended to carry the path three miles (4.8 km) to Heddle's Port, the engineering and other construction works this would entail were considered to be too expensive. Instead a final extension of the path only as far as the Seven Sisters caves opened in 1908.

=== Steamer services ===
The Larne-Stranraer steamer service continued to prosper. A new steamer, the Princess Maud, was delivered in May 1904. She was the first turbine steamer to operate on any of the cross-channel services on the Irish Sea. A further steamer arrived in 1912. The Princess Victoria was broadly similar to the Maud but with more powerful engines and improved passenger accommodation.

Meanwhile, the Midland Railway's Heysham-Belfast service began operations in September 1904 with three new ships, Antrim, Donegal and Londonderry. The NCC was less involved in this route than that to Stranraer but managed the facilities at the Donegall Quay berth in Belfast and provided booking facilities both in Belfast and through booking from its stations.

=== World War I ===
The NCC was relatively unaffected by the events of World War I. Most cross-channel traffic was carried on the principal Kingstown-Holyhead route.

Conscription was never applied in Ireland but 318 of the NCC's employees enlisted in the armed forces of whom 60 were to be killed during the hostilities.

In September 1914 the NCC undertook to build seventy road transport wagons at York Road for the War Department and in October 1915 subcontracted work on munitions for Workman Clark & Co.

The war created severe shortages of permanent way materials and a number of little used sidings were lifted for the materials they yielded. It was also necessary to resort to using sleepers made from home-grown timber rather than the imported Baltic variety. Steel boiler tubes replaced copper and brass in locomotives for economy and a different pattern of uniform overcoat had to be sourced since the government had commandeered the wool crop.

Greencastle, the first station out of Belfast, closed in June 1916 because of competition from the extended Belfast tramways.

The NCC along with other Irish railways adopted Greenwich Mean Time in October 1916. This was 25 minutes ahead of Dublin or Irish time which had previously been used throughout Ireland.

The Belfast and Portrush hotels continued to function fairly normally although they had lost their French and German employees at the outbreak of war. The Laharna, on the other hand, was suffering from a shortage of tourists and was requisitioned by the army in 1917.

The steamer services were affected by the war. The Princess Victoria was requisitioned as a troop ship leaving the Princess Maud to operate the Larne-Stranraer mail service which was sometimes the only crossing available due to enemy submarine activity in the Irish Sea. The Princess Victoria returned to cross-channel service in 1920. The Heysham service was suspended in the latter part of the war and the steamer SS Donegal was sunk while on war service in 1917.

==== Government control ====
The railways in Great Britain had come under government control from the outbreak of war but those in Ireland had not. The trades unions believed that under control their members would achieve parity in wartime bonuses with cross-channel railwaymen and applied constant pressure to achieve this. Frustrated with a lack of progress the unions threatened to strike in December 1916 which prompted the government to agree to taking control of the Irish lines. On 22 December 1916 they came under Board of Trade supervision which acted through the Irish Railways Executive Committee (IREC).

The government paid compensation to the railways to bring their net yearly receipts up to those of 1913 subject to limitations on capital expenditure. The NCC had already been affected by virtue of its Midland Railway parent having been under control since 1914. The cost of war bonuses was also met by the government.

The tremendous consumption of coal by industry meant that less was available for Ireland and in March 1918 the Board of Trade ordered the Irish railways to cut their consumption by 20%. The NCC maintained its goods mileage but reduced passenger working by a quarter.

Control did not end with the Armistice in 1918. The IREC enforced the eight-hour day for railwaymen starting in January 1919. This resulted in the NCC having to employ an additional 158 men in the traffic department.

The newly created Ministry of Transport assumed the powers of the IREC which ceased to function on 31 December 1919. Negotiations between the railways and the ministry for de-control and compensation continued throughout 1920 and early 1921 and governmental supervision came to an end on 15 August 1921.

=== The troubles ===
There was widespread political unrest in Ireland during the 1920s. The railways were prime targets although the NCC did not suffer as seriously as other lines. On 25 March 1921, wooden buildings at Crossroads, Cargan, Parkmore and Retreat on the Cushendall line were set on fire and completely destroyed. The same night the signal cabins at Killagan and Dunloy on the main line were destroyed by fire while that at Glarryford suffered minor damage.

Two trains that were crossing at Staffordstown on 29 June 1921 were held up by armed men who robbed mailbags. In a similar incident armed men stopped a train from Parkmore near Martinstown and again rifled mailbags.

On 3 May 1922 an attempt was made to set fire to coaches stabled at Limavady but was foiled by the prompt action of staff. A more serious arson attack on 19 May destroyed part of Ballymena station.

The only recorded attempt to damage the track itself was on 19 May when a bridge between Killagan and Dunloy was damaged by explosives. Repairs took four days during which time passengers had to pass the gap on foot.

Sadly two members of staff were murdered in Belfast. The first incident took place on the night of 14 April 1922 when a driver was shot near the engine shed and in the other a ganger was killed in broad daylight on 22 May. One other casualty was a police constable who was hit by a train while guarding Randalstown viaduct.

=== Changed conditions ===
The railways had regained control of their own finances in August 1921 and were again dependent on their own resources. However, a large number of former military lorries had come on to the second hand market and, with no system of licensing in place, anyone who wished could set up as a common carrier. In August 1921, James Cowie, the NCC's manager, estimated that 50 000 tons of goods traffic was being lost annually.

Ireland had been partitioned in 1921 and in May 1922 the newly created Northern Ireland government set up a commission to enquire into the railways operating in Northern Ireland. The majority report recommended continuing the existing system of private management but recommended several economies such as common use of wagons and plant. The minority report recommended nationalisation.

The unsatisfactory financial condition of all the companies was noted with only the NCC considered to be in a strong position by virtue with its British connections even though it receipts were markedly reduced. The committee recommended that the struggling Ballycastle Railway should be amalgamated with the NCC. The government took no action, being preoccupied with other matters.

Between 1913 and 1922 there had been a 26% reduction in passenger traffic and 25% less goods traffic. Receipts had increased by nearly 60% but working expenditure has risen by an alarming 112% and the necessity for economy was to become a dominant factor in operating the railway.

== London, Midland and Scottish Railway (Northern Counties Committee) ==
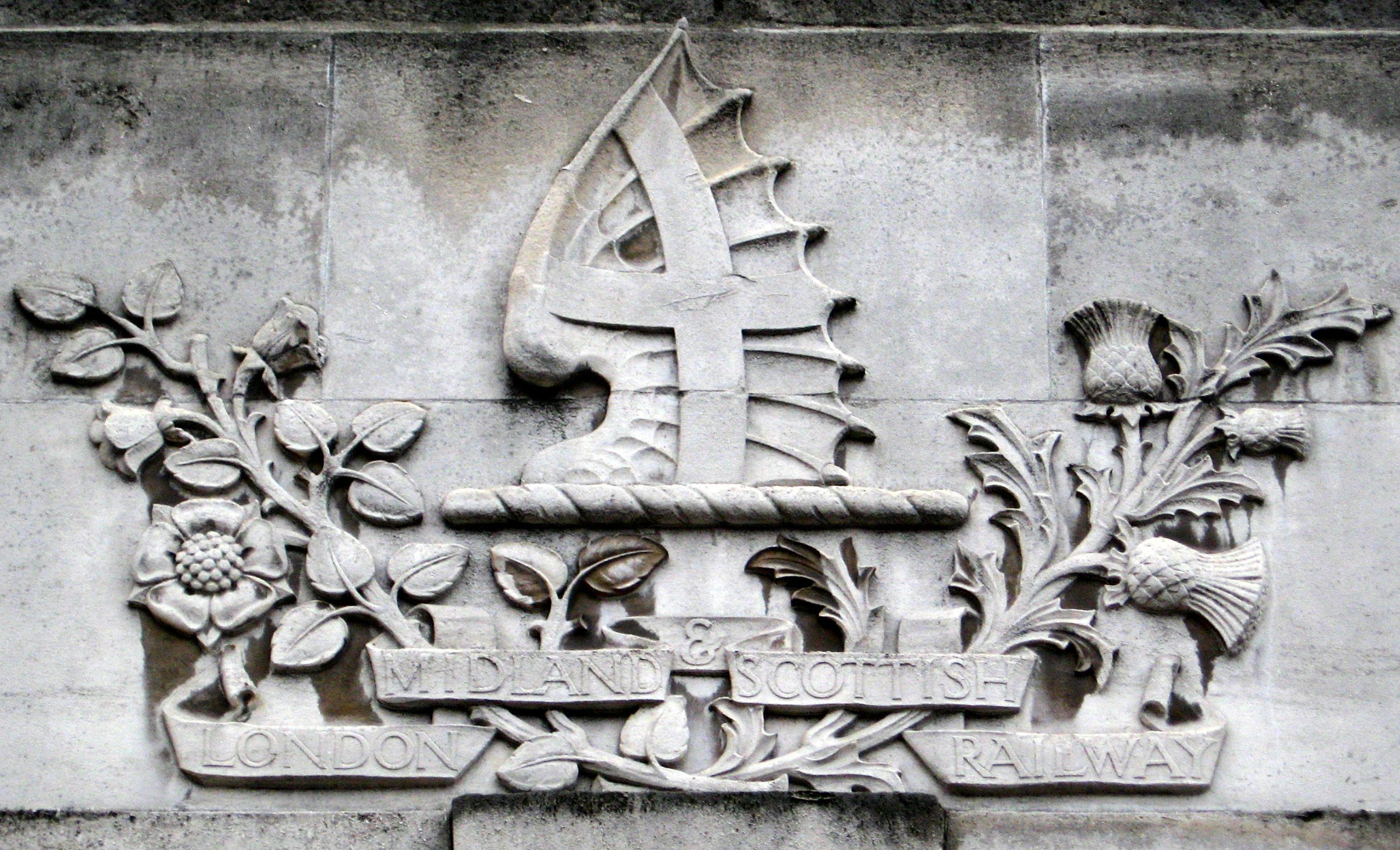
LMS crest.

The Midland Railway, and with it the NCC, was grouped by the Railways Act 1921 into the London, Midland & Scottish Railway (LMS) in 1923. On grouping, it was recorded as having 201 miles (323 km) of Irish broad gauge and 64 miles (103 km) of 3 ft (0.91 m) narrow gauge track. The LMS started painting NCC locomotives and carriages into crimson lake (also known as Midland red).

A new railway bridge over the River Bann at Coleraine was opened in March 1924. It had been built to replace an older bridge dating from 1860. The construction of this 800-foot-long (240 m) bridge was carried out to the design and largely under the supervision of Bowman Malcolm. The opening span was the first application of the Strauss underhung bascule principle in the United Kingdom.

The NCC took over the operation of the narrow gauge Ballycastle Railway in August 1924, completing its acquisition of the line in June 1925 under the London Midland and Scottish Railway (Ballycastle Railway Vesting) Act (Northern Ireland) 1925 (15 & 16 Geo. 5. c. ii (N.I.)). This brought the NCC up to its maximum route mileage of 282 miles (454 km).

The first line closure took place when the Portstewart Tramway ceased operating on 31 January 1926 due to continuing losses, deferred maintenance and obsolete equipment. The NCC sponsored a replacement bus service.

York Road station, Belfast was resignalled with colour light signalling. The installation, which was brought into use in 1926, was the first of its kind in Ireland and among the earliest large installations in the United Kingdom.

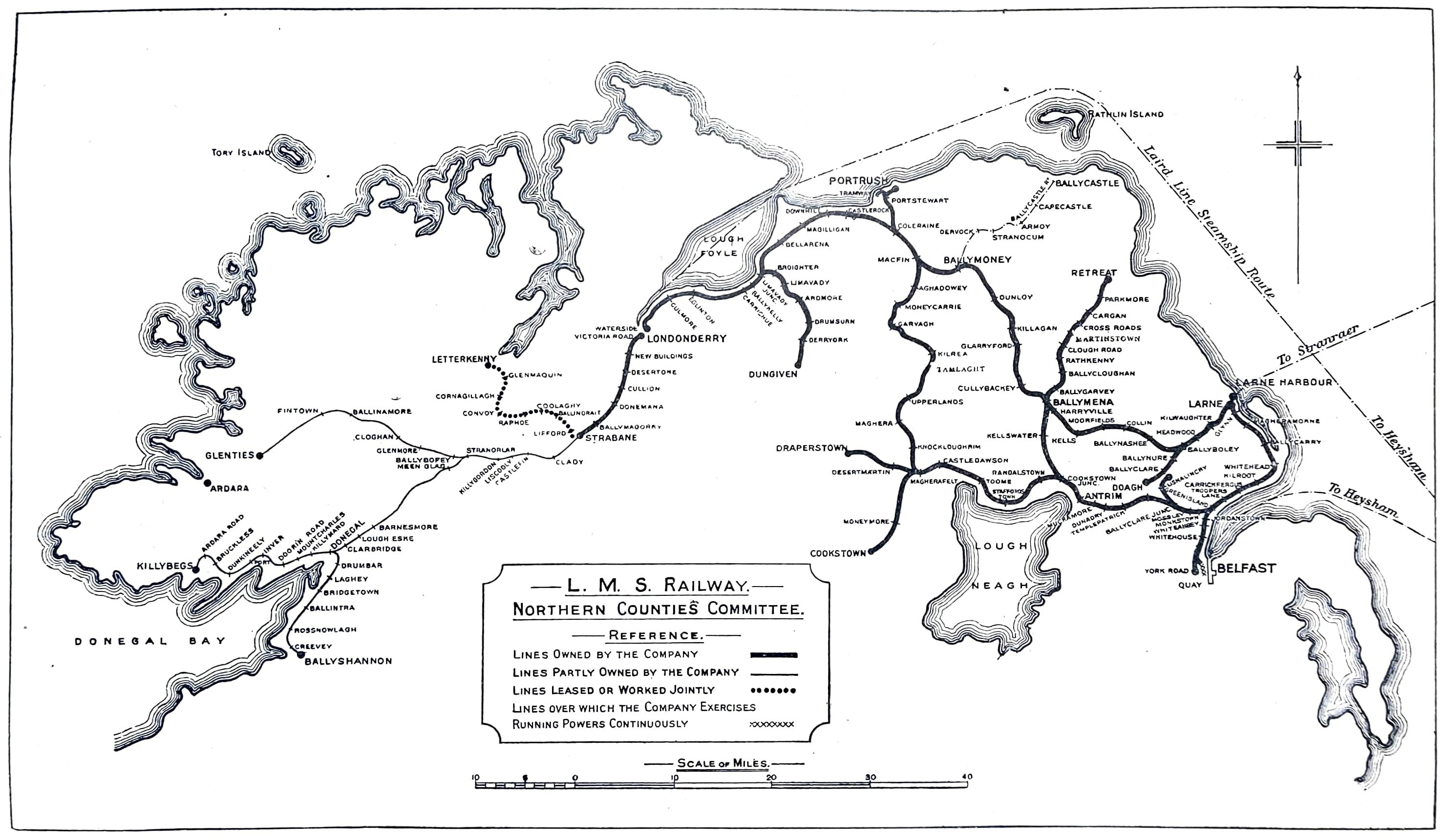
1926 map of NCC

During the 1920s, the railways began to face increasing competition from road transport operators. The NCC responded by taking over competing bus services and running its own bus network.

=== Statistics – 1932 ===
- In 1932 the Committee owned 73 locomotives, of which 14 were tank engines; 190 passenger carriages; 150 other coaching vehicles and 2389 goods vehicles.
- The company's locomotives ran a total of 1 941 407 engine miles of which 1 213 336 were loaded train miles.
- Carried 2 682 291 passengers; 99 053 head of livestock and 549 087 tons of goods traffic.
- The Committee owned 115 buses and 36 goods and parcels road vehicles.
- The Committee owned the Midland Station Hotel, Belfast; Northern Counties Hotel, Portrush; and the Laharna Hotel, Larne

All details in this section are from London Midland and Scottish Railway Company (Northern Counties Committee) Financial Accounts and Statistical Returns. Year 1932.

=== Developments in the 1930s ===
Although the NCC had dealt with the issue of competing passenger road transport by running its own bus services, competition from unregistered road freight operators remained a problem.

A number of innovations were introduced during the 1930s with the intention of bringing about greater economies or improving services to retain existing customers and attract new ones.

On the single line sections of the Main Line north-west of Ballymena and on the Larne Line north of Whitehead, crossing loops were relaid in the 1930s to provide one completely straight or "fast" line to allow the passage of express trains at high speed in both directions.

==== Greenisland Loop Line ====
It had long been recognised that the need for Main Line trains to reverse at Greenisland was undesirable. Various plans for a direct line bypassing Greenisland had been proposed over the years but the engineering problems faced by having to cross Valentine's Glen near Whiteabbey and surmount Mossley Col had precluded these. However, construction started on such a scheme on 1 January 1931.

This involved creating a new junction at Bleach Green where the Larne and Loop Lines diverged. The former main line from Greenisland Junction was singled and joined the new Main Line at a new connection, Mossley Junction, to the east of Mossley station. The old main line became known as the "Back Line". The ruling gradient on the Loop Line was 1 in 75 which could only be achieved by excavating and lowering a section of the existing Main Line near Mossley station. The new lines were carried over Valentine's Glen on imposing ferro-concrete viaducts. The smaller of these curved to the east from Bleach Green Junction as a burrowing junction passing under a skew span of the larger Main Line viaduct which curved westwards. The old masonry Main Line viaduct was retained to carry what had become the up Larne Line.

A strike by Irish locomotive men in 1933 delayed completion and it was not until 22 January 1934 that the new lines opened for regular service.

Part of the programme included resignalling the lines between Belfast, Greenisland and Mossley Junction with automatic colourlight signals. A new signal cabin was built at Greenisland to control train movements over the triangle formed by the Loop Line, Larne Line and the Back Line.

Although the distance covered by the Loop Line was only two miles less than by the old route, eliminating the reversal at Greenisland saved as much as fifteen minutes allowing services to be accelerated. Some up Main Line trains were divided at Ballyclare Junction with coaches for Larne Harbour being detached and worked over the Back Line to Greenisland while the main part of the train continued to Belfast.

==== North Atlantic Express ====
Given the opportunity for accelerating services provided by the opening of the Greenisland Loop Lines and the availability of the new powerful Class W 2-6-0 locomotives, a new express service known as the "North Atlantic Express" was introduced between Portrush on the north coast of County Antrim and Belfast.

The "North Atlantic Express" began operation on 1 June 1934 and was intended to exploit the market in prestigious long-distance commuter traffic. A set of three luxurious new coaches with large picture windows, including a 60 ft (18 m) buffet car, was built for the service.

Initially, 80 minutes was allowed for the 65 1/4 miles (105.0 km) journey with a stop of one minute at Ballymena but this was progressively reduced to 73 minutes by 1938. Slick working was needed as slightly more than half of the route was single track. For the first time on the NCC a start-to-stop booking of 60 mph (97 km/h) was required as only 31 minutes were allowed for the 31 miles (50 km) from Ballymena to Belfast.

Two further coaches were built for the "North Atlantic Express" in 1935 and on arrival at Belfast in the morning the set was speedily attached to the Larne Harbour boat train to provide a through Portrush to Larne service.

The "North Atlantic Express" was discontinued on the outbreak of World War Two although the coaches would be used on prestige services in the immediate post-war years.

==== Railcars ====
Four railcars entered service on the NCC's lines between 1933 and 1938. They were all double-ended single units with underfloor engines and running on two four-wheel bogies.

The first of these, No.1, was 56 ft (17 m) long and seated 61 passengers. It had a traditionally constructed wooden body and was powered by two Leyland 130 bhp (97 kW) petrol engines with hydraulic transmission in the form of Lysholm-Smith torque converters. No.1 was re-engined with Leyland diesels in 1947 and again in 1959.

The next car, No.2, introduced in 1934, was to a radically different design. An ungainly looking machine, it had a 62 ft (19 m) long, slab-sided lightweight body that was to prove problematic. To eliminate the need to run round its trailer at termini, it was equipped with an elevated driving position at each end (similar to some French railcars) so that the driver could see over the top of a trailer that was being propelled. No.2 could seat 75 third class and five first class passengers and was powered by two 125 bhp (93 kW) Leyland Diesel engines with a similar transmission to No.1. No.2's looks were improved somewhat when the raised drivers' cabs were removed during its NCC service.

Railcars Nos.3 and 4 were built in 1935 and 1938 respectively and were virtually identical. Like No.2, they were 62 ft (19 m) long with elevated driving positions but there the similarity ended as the cars had "air smoothed" bodywork. Each seating 80 passengers, they too were powered by two 125 bhp (93 kW) Leyland Diesel engines with hydraulic transmission.

In 1934, two railcar trailers emerged from York Road works. Of light weight construction, they weighed only 17 tons (17 tonne) but each could seat 100 passengers. They had a low roof profile so that the railcar driver in his elevated cab could more easily see ahead when propelling them. Elderly former BNCR Class I1 bogie brake tricomposite coaches dating from the 1890s supplemented the purpose-built trailers and provided an interesting contrast between the latest technology and Victorian design.

Besides pulling their trailers, the railcars could also be seen hauling 4-wheel vans. With top speeds of around 60 mph (97 km/h), the railcars were not restricted to branch lines but could also work stopping trains on the main lines.

Railcar No.2 was withdrawn in 1954 and No.3 was destroyed by fire in 1957 but the remaining two cars were to continue in service until the mid-1960s.

=== Pole report and the NIRTB ===
Joint NCC and NIRTB tours guide for the summer of 1936.

The railways continued to lose business to unlicensed, "pirate" road freight operators and in 1932, the BCDR, GNR(I) and NCC formally asked the government to create a monopoly covering road transport throughout Northern Ireland. Sir Felix Pole, a former manager of the Great Western Railway, was appointed to investigate the road transport situation. After taking evidence from a wide range of interests, such as the railways, road transport operators, transport users and trades unions, his report was published in July 1934. Pole recommended that a board be set up to control all bus and lorry operations which would co-operate and co-ordinate its activities with the railways.

The government accepted these proposals and, on 1 October 1935, the Northern Ireland Road Transport Board (NIRTB) came into being and absorbed buses and coaches from the three railway companies. The NCC handed over 131 buses and 56 lorries together with operating and maintenance staff, the Smithfield bus station in Belfast and other facilities. A joint NCC/NIRTB passenger timetable was issued from 1 October and it was arranged that the NIRTB could continue to use the former NCC bus and lorry facilities at railway stations. However, the hoped for co-operation between road and rail failed to materialise and the new board appeared to be only interested in co-ordinating road transport to better compete with the railways. There were complaints from the public that the NIRTB's rates were higher and its services poorer than those previously provided.

In response to demands from the railways and other interested parties, the government set up two enquiries into the road transport situation. A committee headed by Sir William McClintock made a wide-ranging and complex investigation into the financial and organisational structure while a commission of His Honour Herbert Thompson KC specifically investigated rates and fares. The scope of these reports overlapped to some extent and they were published together in late 1938.

The McClintock report ascertained that there was organised competition on the part of the NIRTB against the railways' freight services. It recommended abolishing the NIRTB and setting up a single authority to control road transport, the NCC and the BCDR (the GNR(I) was excluded because of its international nature). A select committee of both Houses of the Northern Ireland Parliament was appointed to review the reports. It completed its deliberations in mid 1939 and recommended that the Government should compel the NIRTB and the railways to co-ordinate their services. The political climate in the late summer of 1939 was, however, such that no action would be taken and the unsatisfactory transport situation continued.

=== World War II ===
Front cover of Emergency Timetable 'A' dated 16 October 1939

Following the declaration of war on 3 September 1939, Emergency Time Table 'A' was introduced. Services were cut back to reduce train mileage and decelerated so that the running speed of many trains did not exceed 45 mph (72 km/h). However, the speed limit was not rigidly enforced and subsequent issues of the time table progressively expanded the service. A regular routine was established which lasted until the air raids in 1941.

During 1940 two ambulance trains were prepared for emergencies. For each train the LMS provided three regauged coaches and the NCC and GNR(I) each supplied four vehicles. Initially both were stationed at Whitehead but one was later moved to the GNR(I). The ambulance trains were little used and returned to railway ownership in 1944. At the same time, the War Department converted a number of GNR(I) wagons into diesel-engined armoured trolleys. Disguised as cement wagons, they were initially stationed at Whitehead and later Magherafelt.

Unlike the situation in World War I, government control was not imposed on the railways of Northern Ireland during World War II.

NCC trains covered almost twelve million miles during the six years of war.

==== The Blitz ====
The Luftwaffe attacked Belfast three times in 1941. The first air raid was on the night of 7/8 April. Although some doors and windows were blown out, little damage was done to NCC installations. An attack in greater force on the night of 15/16 April was a much more serious affair. York Road station was hit, the facade suffering considerable damage. The general stores department and various offices were burned out.

The last air raid was on 4 May and concentrated on the docks and shipyard. The NCC suffered severe damage because of its closeness to the docks and York Road station was made unusable. Almost all the remaining station offices, its overall roof and the Midland Hotel were gutted by fire. Both the inwards and outwards goods sheds were destroyed and the works section extensively damaged with several workshops completely burned out and a consequent loss of stores and equipment. Bombs also cut the running lines in two places between York Road and Whitehouse.

Unfortunately, manning problems meant that it had not been possible to evacuate rolling stock to other locations as planned and several trains were caught in the air raid. Twenty coaches were destroyed along with more than 250 wagons representing heavy losses of 10% and 15% of total stock respectively. Despite the surrounding destruction, however, the locomotive sheds and the signal cabin remained undamaged.

Temporary passenger termini were set up at Whitehouse and Whiteabbey with shuttle bus services to the city operated by the NIRTB. Goods services were transferred to the GNR(I) Grosvenor Road goods yard. Meanwhile, the Civil Engineer's staff and military personnel worked to clear debris and demolish dangerous structures at York Road. The station reopened to passengers on 8 May and shortly afterwards it was possible to accept goods traffic.

The loss of rolling stock imposed severe constraints on the NCC's ability to maintain its services. The LMS provided twenty ex-Midland Railway coaches that were no longer included in its capital stock and these were regauged in Belfast. Meanwhile, arrangements were made for the Great Southern Railways (GSR) and GNR(I) to build and repair 250 wagons.

==== Military traffic ====
The first special trains carrying soldiers ran on 27 September 1939 when two trains carried a Belfast territorial battalion from a camp in Portstewart.

The NCC served both of Northern Ireland's most important harbours, Belfast and Larne, during the war. From the beginning Larne-Stranraer was the principal route used by military personnel; the Irish state remained neutral and the Dún Laoghaire-Holyhead route was not available. Various territorial units were transferred from Northern Ireland to Great Britain. At first each movement numbered less than 400 personnel but this soon increased to over 1 000 which required multiple special trains and additional steamer sailings.

The first significant move into Northern Ireland was in late 1939 when 2 700 men of the British 158th Infantry Brigade were sent to various destinations. Although there were logistical problems on this occasion, valuable lessons were learned. The buildup of troops in Northern Ireland for training continued and with it came the need to arrange for leave traffic. Few special trains were required at first but in July 1940, an extra steamer sailing was put on from Larne Harbour and additional trains were run from Londonderry and Belfast to connect with it. By 1941, the reverse working from Larne Harbour required a train of up to seventeen coaches.

The first United States troops to land in the United Kingdom in World War II disembarked at Belfast on 26 January 1942. Although some were billeted in Belfast the majority were bound for other destinations. The NCC provided seven special trains and was thus the first railway in World War II to transport American troops in Europe. There were many more such arrivals over the following two years. The need for leave trains decreased considerably as the continued influx of Americans displaced their British counterparts and had almost ceased by mid-1943.

The training programmes for British and American troops involved battle exercises for which heavy military vehicles had to be transported. The NCC converted existing rolling stock to provide 61 end-loading wagons.

Having completed their training, the United States' forces began leaving Northern Ireland in the spring of 1944 in readiness for the Normandy Landings. The NCC worked hard to ensure that each train arrived in Belfast on time so that the troopships could sail with a minimum of delay. Once the invasion of Europe was underway the number of troops in Northern Ireland decreased rapidly and with them the special problems they had created for the NCC.

Londonderry became an important naval base supporting the Battle of the Atlantic and a large traffic in personnel and materiel developed. At its peak in April 1943 some 20 500 men travelled to Londonderry. The facilities at Londonderry were inconvenient and rapidly became inadequate to cope with the buildup in naval activity; in late 1941 the Royal Navy started work on an additional base with extensive jetties at Lisahally about four miles (6.4 km) from Londonderry. The NCC already had a siding at this location and a new signal cabin and crossing loop were installed. Lisahally base was much used by allied navies during the Battle of the Atlantic and at the end of the war as a berth for captured German U-boats.

Some movements of prisoners of war (POW) took place, mostly of captured submarine crews, who were transported by train from Londonderry to Belfast en route to internment at Holywood. Later, vacated army camps were used as POW centres, those on the NCC being near Dunloy and Cookstown.

==== Civilian traffic ====
Civilian passenger journeys increased rapidly from the start of the war, partly because of evacuation from Belfast and the petrol restrictions which made the railway the only available means of transport. This was particularly so after the 1941 Blitz when many people fled to the countryside.

The following table shows the number of passenger journeys for each of the six years of war, when a total of nearly 45 million passengers were carried, with those for 1937 included for comparison.

Year	First class passengers	Second class passengers	Third class passengers
1937	53,000	48,000	3,606,000
1939	46,000	35,000	3,475,000
1940	71,000	36,000	3,820,000
1941	133,000*	51,000	7,592,000
1942	196,000	68,000	7,786,000
1943	266,000	92,000	7,768,000
1944	317,000	126,000	8,023,000
1945	282,000	127,000	7,826,000

* The sharp increase in first class passengers reflects the effects of petrol rationing followed by the withdrawal of private cars from the roads in 1942.

The passenger train service was greatly changed with only a few old-established trains remaining. War work increased traffic during the morning and afternoon peaks on the Larne line requiring additional trains and even affected services on the main line as far as Cullybackey.

The boat train services were completely altered due to the upsurge in steamer traffic. The pre-war through coaches that had provided a Londonderry-Larne Harbour service via Belfast were replaced by a direct service of up and down trains routed along the Back Line from Monkstown Junction to Greenisland.

Before the war most of the military works had been centred on Belfast but now workmen had to travel all over the system, especially between Coleraine and Londonderry where several airfields were being constructed. Further services were operated between Coleraine and Aghadowey and from Cullybackey and Randalstown to Aldergrove for airfield construction and from Belfast and Cullybackey to the Royal Naval torpedo factory at Antrim. The long closed halt at Barn near Carrickfergus reopened in 1942 to serve nearby mills producing parachutes.

There was one unusual occurrence of a station having to close because of excessive demand. The tiny halt at Eden between Carrickfergus and Kilroot had platforms that were barely one coach long yet about one hundred passengers were forcing themselves on to it at the morning peak. There was a danger that some would be swept off by non-stop trains and the halt was closed. Later, Eden was reopened for some off peak services.

==== Freight ====
There was a significant upsurge in freight traffic. The following table shows the tonnages of traffic moved by freight trains in the years between 1938 and 1945.

Year	Freight (tons)
1938	402,600
1939	477,300
1940	570,200
1941	713,900
1942	874,900
1943	755,200
1944	807,700
1945	724,300

Five new classes of freight traffic contributed to this increase:

- Government stores for the Royal Navy, War Department and Royal Air Force depots;
- Construction materials for airfields, etc.;
- Traffic dispersed for safe storage away from Belfast;
- Development of materials not used in peacetime;
- Traffic directed from road to rail because of petrol rationing.

Northern Ireland's strategic importance led to an increase in the number of airfields from three to twenty one. This massive construction programme required huge quantities of stone, cement and general building materials. The NCC's ballast quarry at Ballyboyland and others at Portrush and Coleraine supplied the majority of the stone needed for the airfields in the NCC's area. Cement came by rail from the British Portland Cement Manufacturers' works at Magheramorne and via the GNR(I) from Drogheda in County Louth.

Additional military supply depots were built near NCC lines at Ballyclare, Lismoney near Magherafelt and at Desertmartin on the Draperstown branch. There were petrol depots at Randalstown and Limavady all of which generated a great deal of traffic. Ammunition generally came into Northern Ireland through the harbours at Coleraine and Warrenpoint and was forwarded by rail to depots at Antrim and Dungiven.

=== Post-war era ===
Large-scale troop movements and additional passenger and freight traffic had ensured the NCC's prosperity during World War II. The ending of hostilities, however, saw passenger and goods traffic receipts decline rapidly as fuel for road transport became available.

Despite the worsening financial situation, the NCC introduced a number of measures in an attempt to improve the railway's competitive position. Services were accelerated and, although the poor condition of the track due to deferred maintenance meant that it was not possible to attain pre-war timings, strenuous efforts were made to ensure that trains adhered to the published schedules.

In 1944 the NCC had decided that its system should be worked by tank engines and placed an initial order for four locomotives to be built at Derby and erected in Belfast. The first of these WT Class 2-6-4 tank locomotives were delivered in the late summer of 1946. Additional orders followed and by the end of 1947 ten engines were in service. Passenger rolling stock was augmented by eight elderly ex-Midland Railway coaches from the LMS which were refurbished in Belfast and fitted with salvaged 5 ft 3 in (1.60 m) gauge bogies.

A start was made on restoring the permanent way and air-raid damage at York Road station was repaired.

The company's hotels, which had closed during the war years, were reopened to the public by mid-1947 although the Midland Station Hotel in Belfast, which had suffered severe damage during the 1941 Blitz, was not fully operational. Paths and bridges at Glenariff were repaired but the Gobbins cliff path, on which maintenance had ceased in 1942, would not reopen under NCC management.

The Northern Ireland Government resumed its deliberations into the transport situation that had been postponed during the war. It published a White Paper in 1946 that proposed the amalgamation of the BCDR, the NCC and the NIRTB, together with that portion of the GNR(I) which lay in Northern Ireland, into a single organisation to be known as the Ulster Transport Authority (UTA). In the event, however, the GNR(I) was to be excluded from the provisions of The Transport Act (Northern Ireland) 1948 (c. 16 (N.I.)) and when the UTA came into existence on 1 April 1948, only the BCDR and the NIRTB would be absorbed at first; the NCC's British connection meant that there was a delay in its acquisition by the new organisation.

== Nationalisation, centenary and sale ==
On 1 January 1948, the LMS was nationalised and passed to the Railway Executive of the British Transport Commission. The NCC became known as the Railway Executive (NCC) and was operationally part of the London Midland Region of British Railways.

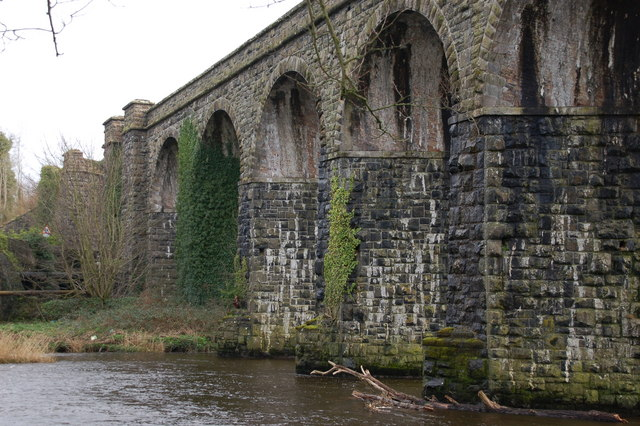
The former railway viaduct at Randalstown on one of the lines destroyed under the action of the Ulster Transport Authority.

The NCC celebrated the centenary of the opening of the Belfast and Ballymena Railway on 11 April 1948 with a minor flourish. An illustrated booklet was printed and distributed to customers and staff. It included a chronology of the NCC and its predecessors, a history of the steamer services, a route description of the Main Line and a map of the system. The BBC Northern Ireland Home Service broadcast a centenary programme on 12 April; it was narrated by John D. Stewart, the writer and dramatist.

Under the provisions of the Transport Act (Northern Ireland) 1948 (c. 16 (N.I.)), the Northern Ireland Government purchased the NCC in 1949 for £2,668,000, and the NCC became part of the Ulster Transport Authority from 1 April 1949.

Today (2007) the former NCC main line from Belfast to Derry~Londonderry, the Larne line and the Portrush branch remain open and are operated by Northern Ireland Railways.

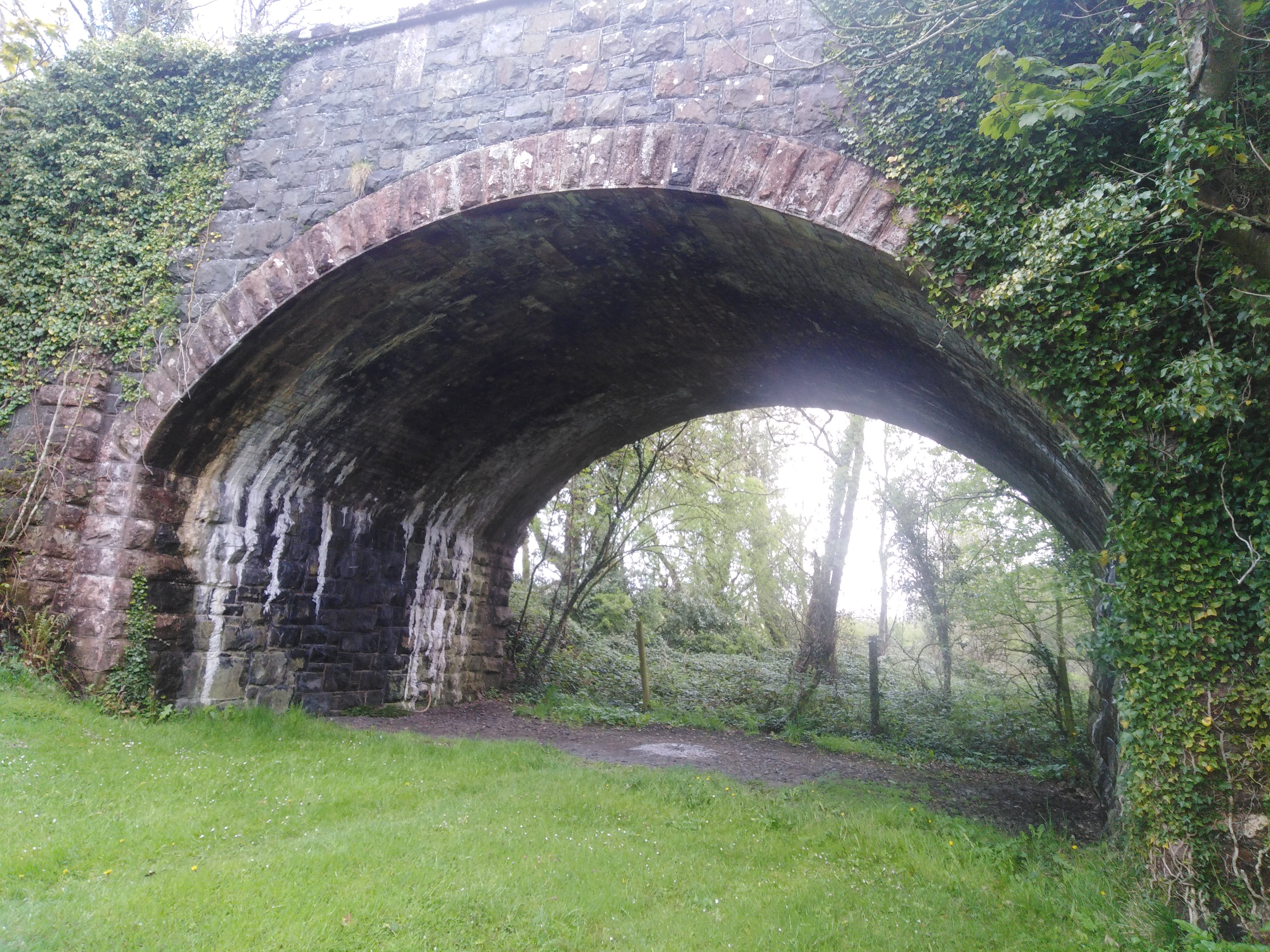
Bowmans Bridge

The upgrading of the Belfast to Derry~Londonderry by NI Railways will give faster more frequent trains with better permanent way and signalling as part of the strategic investment in the network.

== Signalling ==
NCC somersault signals at Carrickfergus

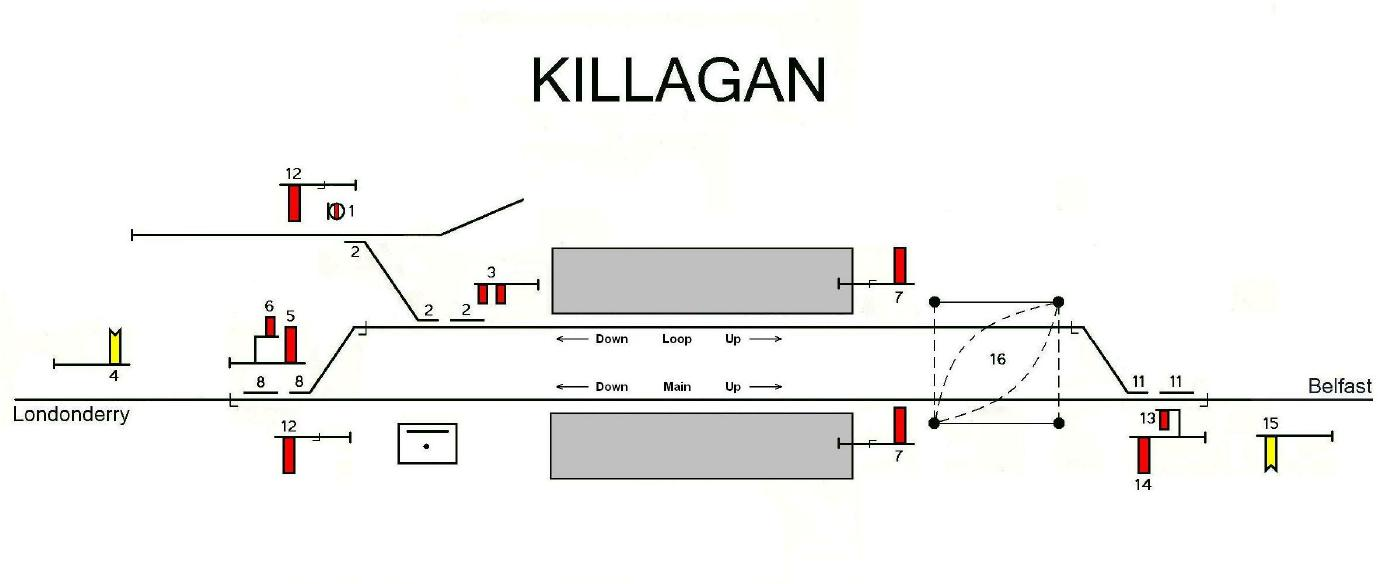
Signalling diagram of crossing loop with fast line

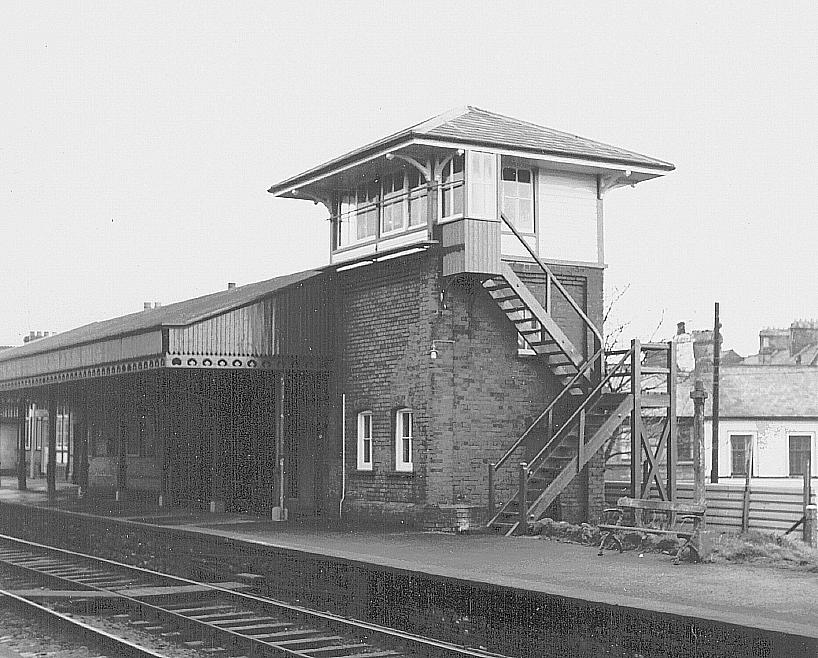
Whitehead signal cabin

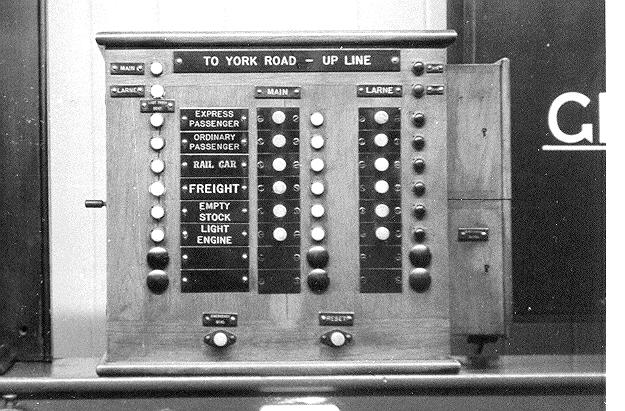
Magazine train describer in Greenisland signal cabin

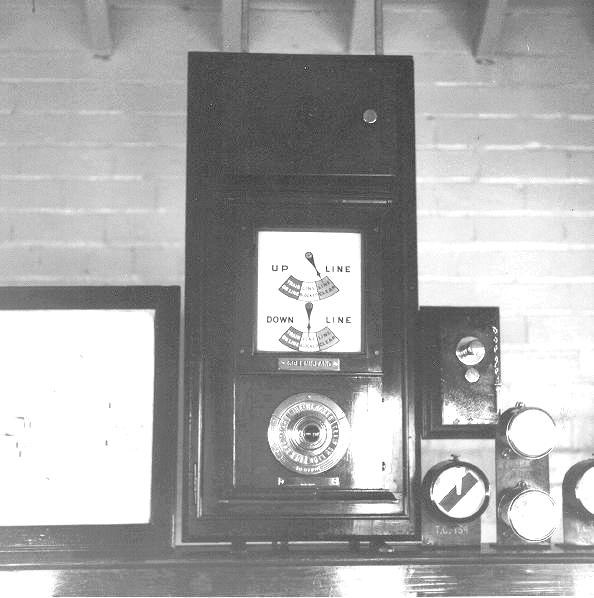
Tyer's 3-position absolute block instrument

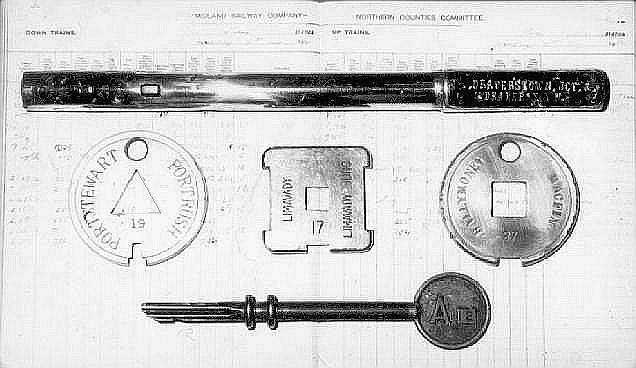
NCC single line tokens

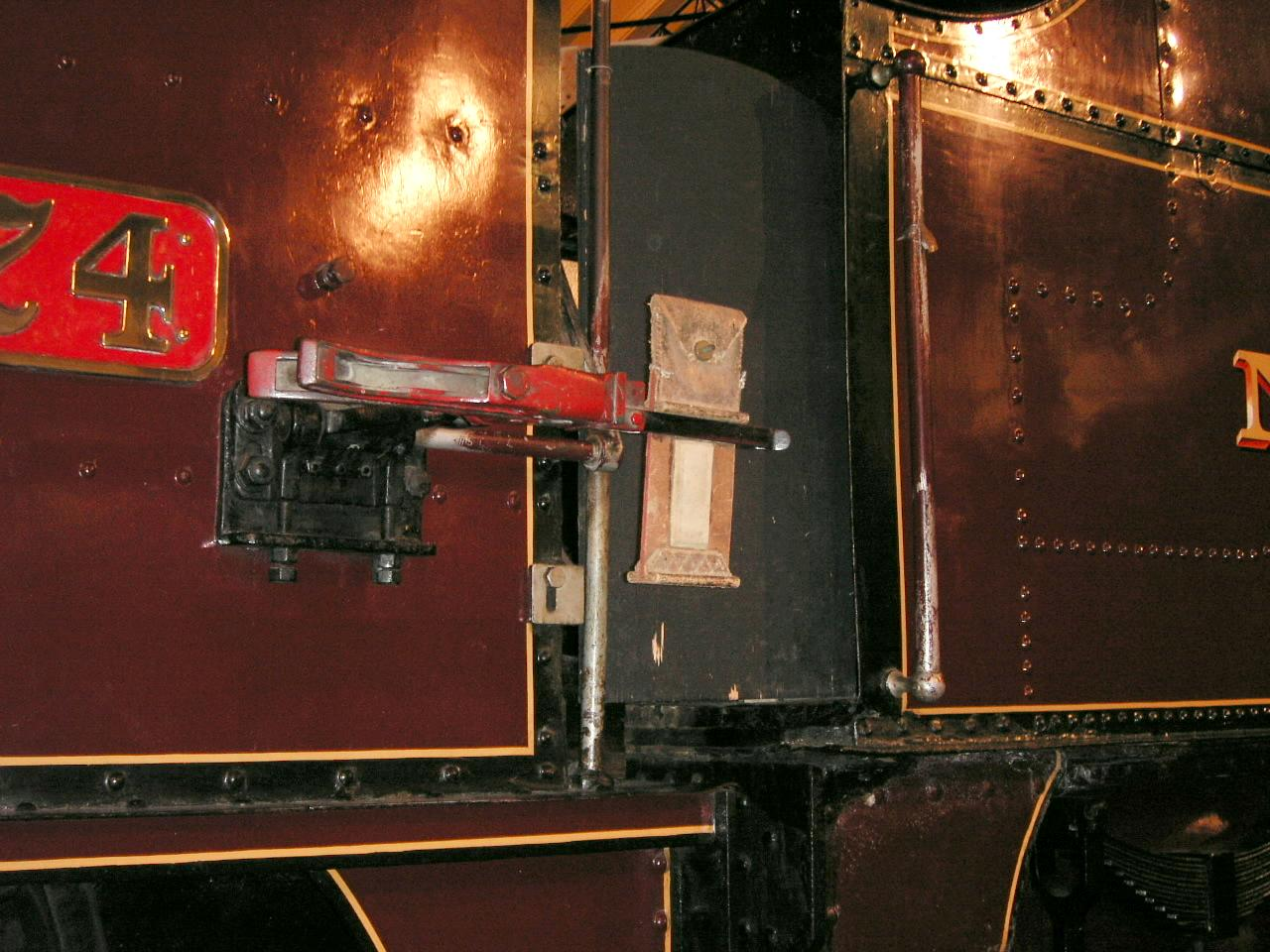
Manson tablet exchange apparatus fitted to a locomotive

The majority of the NCC system was signalled using somersault signals. This type of lower quadrant semaphore signal, with a centrally pivoted arm, had originated on the Great Northern Railway in England.

Upper quadrant semaphore signals were installed at Larne Harbour station when the layout was remodelled in 1933.

Two types of mechanical ground signals were installed. The majority were similar to the LNER standard type but others of a Westinghouse type were to be found at Larne Harbour and a few other locations.

There were three colour light signal installations on the NCC. The earliest was at York Road station, Belfast where two-aspect colour light signals had been installed in 1926. The subsidiary signals were of a unique "pointer light" type.

Two-aspect searchlight signals were installed on the Main and Shore Lines in 1934 in connection with the opening of the Greenisland Loop Line. Finally, Coleraine was resignalled with three-aspect colour light signals in 1938.

At those crossing loops on the Main and Larne Lines which had been relaid with straight "fast" lines, the fast lines and loops were both fully signalled for working trains in the up and down directions. The use of Manson tablet exchange apparatus at these locations allowed tablet exchanges to be carried out regularly at speeds of up to (and on occasion in excess of) 60 mph (97 km/h).

Most of the signal cabins on the broad gauge lines were to a BNCR hipped roof design by Berkeley Dean Wise that was introduced c1889. They had a brick base with wooden superstructure but usually also a brick back wall to the operating floor. A principal feature of these cabins was the overhanging roof supported by large eaves brackets which served to protect the window sashes from the weather. Newer cabins to the traditional design, such as those at Larne Harbour and Coleraine, omitted the eaves brackets but retained a distinctive appearance.

The new signal cabins at York Road, Greenisland, Antrim and Mount were built entirely from brick with flat concrete roofs. Another exception was Templepatrick cabin which was of all wood construction.

=== Methods of working ===
The various lines on the LMS (NCC) system were worked as follows:

==== Broad gauge lines ====
Automatic and semi-automatic two-aspect searchlight signals together with magazine train describers:

- Main and Shore Lines: Belfast to Greenisland and Monkstown Junction.

Tyer's three-position Absolute Block instruments:

- Main Line: Greenisland – Ballyclare Junction – Kingsbog Junction – Templepatrick – Dunadry – Muckamore – Antrim – Cookstown Junction – Ballymena Goods Yard – Ballymena Passenger Station;
- Larne Line: Greenisland – Carrickfergus Harbour Junction – Carrickfergus Station – Kilroot – Whitehead.

Electric Direction Lever:

- Main Line: Macfin – Coleraine.

Tyer's electric train tablet instruments:

- Main Line: Ballymena Passenger Station – Cullybackey – Glarryford – Killagan – Dunloy – Ballymoney – Macfin; and Coleraine – Castlerock – Bellarena – Limavady Junction – Eglinton – Lisahally – Derry~Londonderry;
- Larne Line (short section working): Whitehead – Ballycarry – Magheramorne Loop – Larne – Larne Harbour;
- Ballyclare Branch: Kingsbog Junction – Ballyclare;
- Cookstown Line: Cookstown Junction – Toome – Castledawson – Magherafelt – Moneymore – Cookstown;
- Derry Central Line: Magherafelt – Maghera – Kilrea – Garvagh – Macfin;
- Portrush Branch: Coleraine – Portstewart – Portrush;
- Limavady Branch: Limavady Junction – Limavady.

Railway Signal Company electric key token instruments:

- Larne Line (long section working): Whitehead – Larne.

Train Staff and Ticket with Tyer's two-position Absolute Block instruments:

- Dungiven Branch: Limavady – Dungiven.

One engine in steam or two or more engines coupled together:

- Draperstown Branch: Draperstown Junction – Draperstown.

==== Narrow gauge lines ====
Tyer's electric train tablet instruments:

- Ballymena and Larne Line: Larne Harbour – Larne – Ballyboley – Ballymena Passenger Station.

Train Staff and Ticket with Tyer's two-position Absolute Block instruments:

- Ballycastle Line: Ballymoney – Ballycastle.

Electric train staff:

- Londonderry and Strabane Line: Londonderry – Donemana – Strabane.

One engine in steam or two or more engines coupled together:

- Doagh Branch: Ballyboley – Doagh;
- Parkmore Line: Ballymena – Parkmore.

Details of signalling systems in this section are mainly from LMS NCC Appendix to the Working Time Table.

== Locomotives ==
=== BNCR and constituents ===
The early locomotives of the constituent companies were to assorted designs from a number of manufacturers. The first locomotives for the Belfast and Ballymena Railway were purchased from Bury, Curtis, and Kennedy. These were four 2-2-2 singles and one 0-4-2 goods engine. Later, four more 2-2-2s were ordered but this time from Sharp Brothers. Fairbairn 2-2-2s were to be found on the Ballymena, Ballymoney, Coleraine and Portrush Junction Railway but this company also favoured Sharp locomotives which were double framed 2-4-0s. These latter engines proved to be a sound investment, of those ordered in 1856, four were still in service in 1924. These locomotives were inherited by the BNCR.

The first engine to be built for the BNCR was No.35, an 0-6-0 by Sharp, Stewart and Company in 1861. Additional 2-4-0 and 0-6-0 locomotives were obtained from Beyer, Peacock & Company.

During his tenure as Locomotive Superintendent from 1876 to 1922, Bowman Malcolm was responsible for creating an extensive stud of Worsdell-von Borries two-cylinder compound locomotives for the BNCR. The first of these entered service in 1890. There were "Light Compounds" which included small 2-4-0s with a peculiarly truncated appearance and larger, more powerful "Heavy Compounds". Noteworthy were the two Class D 2-4-0s Jubilee and Parkmount which had 7 ft (2.1 m) diameter driving wheels and would be rebuilt as 4-4-0s. A 2-4-2 tank version, Class S, was designed for the narrow gauge lines. Many of these engines were built at York Road works, Belfast.

A good number of these locomotives were to survive throughout the LMS NCC period although many were rebuilt to two-cylinder simple expansion.

==== Ross "pop" safety valve ====
Class C 2-4-0 locomotive No.57 was the first engine in the world to be fitted with a Ross "pop" safety valve. The Ross valve was patented in 1902 by fitter R.L. Ross, a Coleraine man who had the first experimental valve made at York Road workshops. This type of two-stage safety valve had a very positive action designed to prevent 'dribbling' of steam from a locomotive boiler at full pressure. In its developed form, the Ross "pop" safety valve would become a standard fitting on British steam locomotives and was also used overseas.

=== NCC ===
MR (NCC) locomotive policy continued BNCR practice and remained largely independent of Derby until Bowman Malcolm retired at the end of 1922. Von Borries compounds were still being built during this period. The last were two narrow gauge Class S 2-4-2 tank engines outshopped in 1919 and 1920. In 1920, the NCC's broad gauge stock included twenty five 2-4-0 tender locomotives as compared with twenty two 4-4-0s. The remaining broad gauge locomotives were sixteen 0-6-0s, four 2-4-0 saddle tanks and two 0-4-0 dock tanks.

Midland Railway and LMS influence became increasingly apparent during the building and renewal programmes undertaken by Malcolm's successors William Wallace and, later, H.P. Stewart. The modernisation and standardisation of NCC locomotives began in 1923 with the delivery of three standard G7 boilers from Derby. Two of these were to be used in rebuilding "Light Compounds" Nos.59 and 62 to Class U1 4-4-0 locomotives. From this time on, with few exceptions, all boilers would be LMS standard ones (G6, G7, G8). Derby works could more economically deal with these boilers than York Road and so they would be sent to Derby for overhaul. The boilers would return some four or five months later with a new firebox fitted, ready for installing in the next suitable engine coming into the works.

==== NCC locomotive classes ====
The BNCR introduced class letters for its locomotive stock in 1897. The MR (NCC) and later the LMS (NCC) continued to use the system adding new classes as required.

The following tables list details (where available) of NCC locomotive classes that were extant at the time of the amalgamation of the BNCR with the Midland Railway in 1903 and those classes which entered NCC stock subsequently.

===== Broad gauge steam locomotives =====
Class	Wheel arrangement	Driving wheel diam	Cylinders bore x stroke (in)	Boiler pressure (psi)	Tractive effort (lbs)	Locomotive weight	Remarks
A	4-4-0	6 ft 0 in (1.83 m)	18 & 26 x 24	175	16 065	45t 1cwt	Compound
A1	4-4-0	6 ft 0 in (1.83 m)	18 x 24	200	18 360	46t 7cwt	
B	4-4-0	6 ft 0 in (1.83 m)	16 & 23 1/4 x 24	160	11 560	39t 17cwt	Compound
B1	4-4-0	6 ft 0 in (1.83 m)	16 & 23 1/4 x 24	160	11 560	43t 9cwt	Compound
B2	4-4-0	6 ft 0 in					
B3	4-4-0	6 ft 0 in	18 x 24	200	18 360	45t 2cwt	
C	2-4-0	6 ft 0 in (1.83 m)	16 & 23 1/4 x 24	160	11 560	37t 6cwt	Compound
C1	2-4-0	6 ft 0 in (1.83 m)	16 & 23 1/4 x 24			43t 8cwt	Compound
D	4-4-0	7 ft 0 in (2.13 m)	18 & 25 x 24	160	13 685	46t 9cwt	Compound
D1	4-4-0	7 ft 0 in (2.13 m)	19 x 24	170	14 904	46t 12cwt	
E	0-6-0	5 ft 2 1/2in	18 & 26 x 24				Compound
E1	0-6-0	5 ft 2 1/2in	18 & 26 x 24	175	18 593	43t 11cwt	Compound
F	2-4-0	6 ft 0 in (1.83 m)	17 x 24			37t 10cwt	
F1	2-4-0	6 ft 0 in (1.83 m)	17 x 24			38t 1cwt	
G	2-4-0	5 ft 6 in (1.68 m)	16 x 22			34t 0cwt	
G1	2-4-0	5 ft 6 in (1.68 m)	16 x 22			38t 1cwt	
H	2-4-0	5 ft 6 in (1.68 m)	15 x 22			33t 5cwt	
I	2-4-0	5 ft 6 in (1.68 m)	15 x 20			29t 4cwt	
J	2-4-0ST	5 ft 2 3/8in	15 x 20	140	8 925	37t 8cwt	
K	0-6-0	5 ft 2 1/2in	17 x 24	170	16 184	38t 9cwt	
K1	0-6-0	5 ft 2 1/2in	17 x 24	170	16 184	39t 8cwt	
L	0-6-0	4 ft 6 in (1.37 m)	17 x 24			38t 16cwt	
L1	0-6-0	4 ft 6 in (1.37 m)	17 x 24			38t 15cwt	
M	0-4-2		17 x 24			39t 8cwt	ex-L&C Rly
N	0-4-0ST	4 ft 0 1/8in	16 x 22	130	12 707	30t 0cwt	Dock engines
T*	0-2-2T					25t 10cwt	Railmotor units
U	4-4-0	6 ft 0 in (1.83 m)	19 x 24			47t 12cwt	
U1	4-4-0	6 ft 0 in (1.83 m)	18 x 24	170	15 696	50t 14cwt	
U2	4-4-0	6 ft 0 in (1.83 m)	19 x 24	170	17 388	51t 10cwt	
V	0-6-0	5 ft 2 1/2in	19 x 24	170	20 031	28t 17cwt	
W	2-6-0	6 ft 0 in (1.83 m)	19 x 26	200	22 160	62t 10cwt	
WT	2-6-4T	6 ft 0 in (1.83 m)	19 x 26	200	22 160	87t 0cwt	
Y	0-6-0T	4 ft 7 in (1.40 m)	18 x 26	160	20 830	49t 10cwt	ex-LMS Class 3F
91^{†}	0-4-0T						Sentinel shunter

* Class T became extinct in 1913; the designation was reassigned to the ex-Ballycastle Railway 4-4-2T narrow gauge locomotives when they were acquired in 1924.
^{†} No class letter was assigned to No.91.

===== Narrow gauge steam locomotives =====
Class	Wheel arrangement	Driving wheel diam	Cylinders bore x stroke (in)	Boiler pressure (psi)	Tractive effort (lbs)	Locomotive weight	Remarks
O	0-4-2ST	3 ft 1 in (0.94 m)	12 x 19	140	8 800	22t 10cwt	ex-Cushendall Rly
P	2-4-0T	3 ft 9 in (1.14 m)	11 x 18	120	4 937	17t 12cwt	ex-B&L Rly
Q	0-6-0T	3 ft 3 in (0.99 m)	13 1/2 x18	140	10 010	21t 2cwt	ex-B&L Rly
R	2-6-0ST	3 ft 3 in (0.99 m)	14 x 18	140	10 765	25t 13cwt	ex-B&L Rly
S	2-4-2T	3 ft 9 in (1.14 m)	14 3/4 & 21 x 20	160	13 150	31t 17cwt	Compound
S1	2-4-2T	3 ft 9 in (1.14 m)	14 3/4 & 21 x 20	160	13 150	33t 0cwt	Compound
S2	2-4-4T	3 ft 9 in (1.14 m)	14 3/4 & 21 x 20	200	16 438	42t 1cwt	Compound
T	4-4-2T	3 ft 7 in (1.09 m)	14 1/2 x 21	160	13 964	39t 11cwt	ex-Ballycastle Rly

===== Diesel locomotives =====
Class	Wheel arrangement	Driving wheel diam	Engine horsepower (bhp)	Tractive effort (lbs)	Locomotive weight	Remarks
X	0-6-0	4 ft 1 1/8in	330	24 000	49t 0cwt	No.17, diesel-hydraulic
20*	0-6-0	3 ft 7 in (1.09 m)	225	15 000	28t 6cwt	No.20, diesel-mechanical
22*	0-6-0	3 ft 2 in (0.97 m)	225	15 000	27t 3cwt	No.22, ex-LMS, diesel-hydraulic
28*	1A-A1	3 ft 7 in (1.09 m)	500		48t 0cwt	No.28, ex-BCDR, diesel-electric

* No class letters were assigned to Nos.20, 22 and 28.

The tabulated data in this section are mainly derived from a review of NCC locomotive diagrams.

== Coaching stock ==
As with the locomotives, Midland Railway influence on NCC coaching stock design only became apparent after Bowman Malcolm retired in 1922.

The NCC was a small railway and did not require the variety of coach types that its parent the LMS did. However, the NCC provided accommodation for three classes of passengers throughout its existence and this led to there being several coach designations that were unique to the NCC.

Most LMS (NCC) coaches were similar to LMS Period I stock. This was perpetuated into the mid-1930s with repeat orders to existing designs. These coaches were mounted on steel under frames that were generally 57 ft (17 m) long, weighed between 28 and 31 tons depending on type, and ran on two four-wheeled bogies. They had wooden framed, fully panelled bodies with semi elliptical roofs and three-link screw couplings.

Side corridor stock such as the J6 thirds and F2 composites had doors with adjacent quarter lights to all compartments and ventilation was by droplights set into the doors. G1 tea cars had a small dining saloon and kitchen set into one end of a composite coach. Although there were no external doors to the dining saloon, the windows retained the droplight and quarter light arrangement.

On the other hand, open stock had a two-window arrangement whereby each seating bay had two windows side by side. One window was fixed and the other was a droplight. Restaurant vehicles such as the B2 first class dining car and the B3 third class dining saloon had Stone's pattern ventilators above the fixed windows but this feature was not included in other open stock. The J5 open thirds were unusual in having four doors per side rather than two. The doors had adjacent quarter lights like those on the side corridor stock and opened directly into the passenger saloon rather than the end vestibules which only accommodated the lavatories.

The "North Atlantic" stock clearly belonged to Period II but the large picture windows and toplight ventilators had been inspired by contemporary Great Western Railway practice. The full set of five coaches was made up of four types. These were a B4 buffet car, an H3 side corridor tricomposite, two J8 side corridor thirds and a K3 side corridor brake third. The buffet car was 60 ft (18 m) long and the others 57 ft (17 m) long.

The class V14 bogie brake vans that appeared in 1936–37 were superficially similar to the LMS variety. However, they had standard 57 ft (17 m) underframes as opposed to 50 ft (15 m) ones and beading strips on the sides to cover panel joints.

The 60 ft (18 m) J10 open thirds that were built at the same time as the V14s generally reflected the styling of William Stanier Period III stock but these too had beading strips. Lavatories on these coaches appear to have been an afterthought. There were three doors on one side but only two on the other; a single lavatory had been squeezed into the vestibule where the missing door would have been. Despite their modern appearance, their bus type seats were not popular with passengers.

=== NCC coaching stock designations ===
Designation	Type*
A	Saloon First
B	Dining Car
C	All First
D	Brake First
E	Brake Composite (1st & 2nd)
F	Composite (1st & 2nd or 1st & 3rd)
G	Tricomposite Tea Car
H	Tricomposite
I	Brake Tricomposite
J	Third
K	Brake Third
V	Fitted vans and other non-passenger coaching vehicles
X	All six-wheeled stock

* Note that there is no distinction made between corridor and non-corridor stock.

Much of the information in this section is derived from a review of NCC coach diagrams.

== Preserved vehicles ==
A number of NCC vehicles have been preserved.

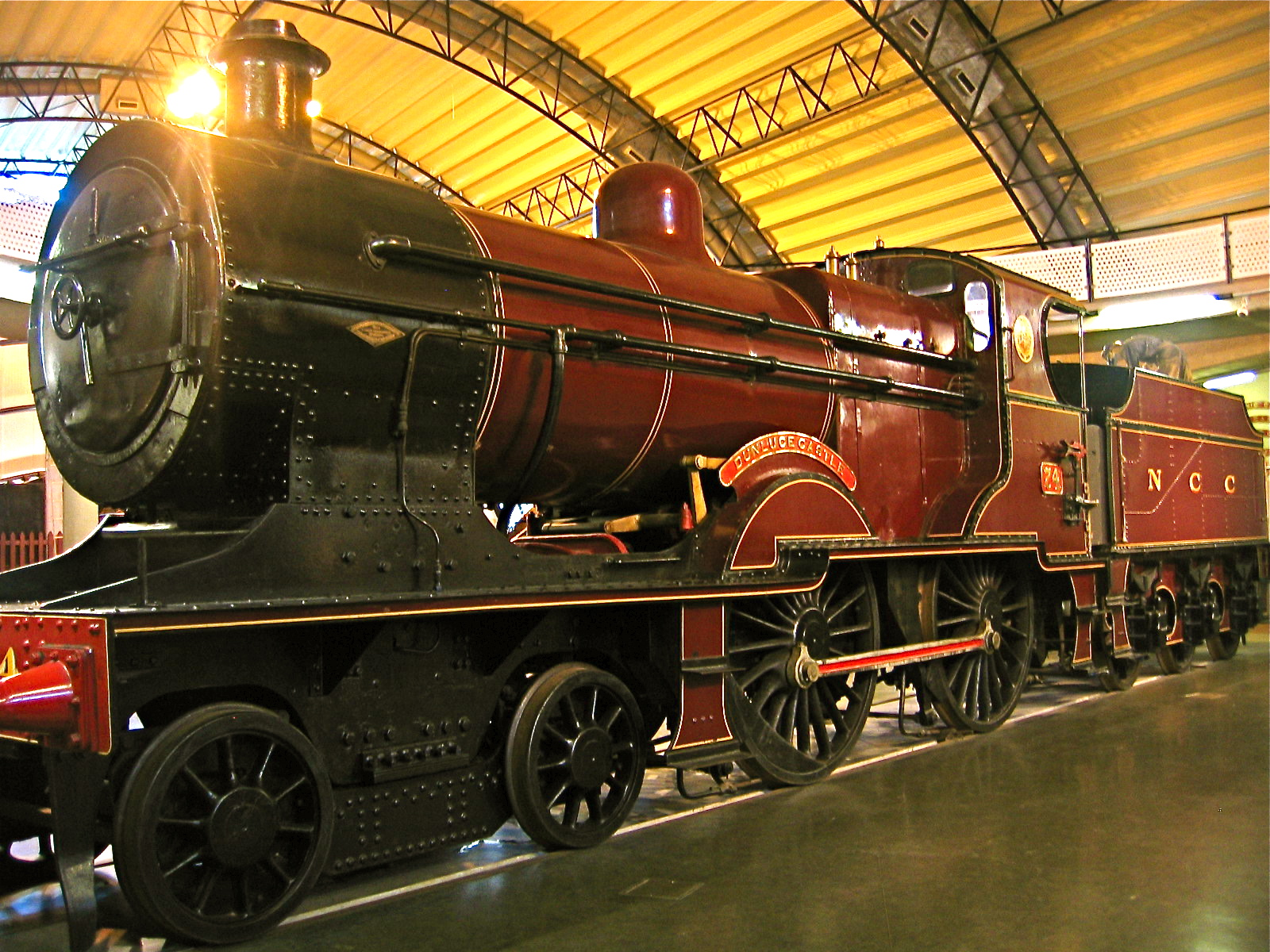
Dunluce Castle

- Class U2 4-4-0 No.74 Dunluce Castle is on display at the Ulster Folk & Transport Museum, Cultra, County Down.

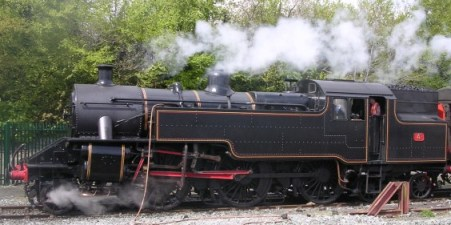
Preserved WT Class loco no 4 at Mallow in May 2006

- Class WT 2-6-4T steam locomotive No.4 is owned by the Railway Preservation Society of Ireland at Whitehead which operates it on special excursion trains on the Irish railway network. The society also owns 3 NCC carriages.
- Although none of the original NCC Class W's have survived into preservation, the Railway Preservation Society of Ireland at Whitehead is building a new member of the class.
- Coaches Nos.68, 87 and 91, are at the Railway Preservation Society of Ireland site at Whitehead.
- Railcar No.1 is stored in a dilapidated condition at the Railway Preservation Society of Ireland site at Whitehead.
- Coaches Nos.238 and 241, former Midland Railway vehicles which had been transferred to the NCC from the LMS as replacements for stock destroyed in the air raid of 4 May 1941, were repatriated in 2004 and 2005 respectively and are at the Embsay & Bolton Abbey Steam Railway, Embsay, Yorkshire.
- Portstewart Tramway Kitson 0-4-0 tram locomotive No.1 was an early candidate for preservation, crossing the Irish Sea in 1939, and is in the collection of the Streetlife Museum of Transport, Kingston-upon-Hull, Yorkshire.
- Portstewart Tramway Kitson 0-4-0 tram locomotive No.2 is on display at the Ulster Folk and Transport Museum, Cultra, County Down.
- An ex-NCC Lister internal combustion engined platform truck may also be seen at the Ulster Folk and Transport Museum.
- LMS (NCC) 36 ton steam breakdown crane (Cowans Sheldon and Co., 1931) – now Ireland's largest – and a number of vans may be found at the Downpatrick and County Down Railway, Downpatrick, County Down.

== People ==
=== Managers ===
==== Belfast & Ballymena Railway / BNCR ====
- Thomas H. Higgin (1848–1857)
- Edward John Cotton (1857–1899)
- James Cowie (1899–1903)

==== NCC ====
- James Cowie (1903–1922)
- James Pepper (1922–1931)
- Major Malcolm S. Spier MC (1931–1941)
- Major Frank A. Pope (1941–1943)
- Robert H.W. Bruce (1943–1946)
- James W. Hutton (1946–1949)

=== Locomotive engineers ===
==== Belfast & Ballymena Railway / BNCR ====
- Ellis Rowland (1847–1849)
- Alexander Yorston (1849–1868)
- Edward Leigh (1868–1875)
- Robert Findlay (1875–1876)
- Bowman Malcolm (1876–1903)

==== NCC ====
- Bowman Malcolm (1903–1922)
- William K. Wallace (1922–1930)
- Hugh P. Stewart (1930–1933)
- Malcolm Patrick (1933–1946)
- John Thompson (1946–1949)

== Sources and further reading ==
- Arnold, R.M. (1973). NCC Saga. Newton Abbot: David & Charles. ISBN 0-7153-5644-5.
- Arnold, R.M. (1973). Supplement to NCC Saga. Whitehead: Railway Preservation Society of Ireland.
- Bairstow, Martin (2007). Railways in Ireland. Vol. 2. ISBN 9781871944334.
- Conacher, John, ed. (1988). From "The North Atlantic" to the "Crackerjacks": Railway time tables from the last great years of the N.C.C. Limavady: North West Books. ISBN 0-907528-12-0. OCLC 931393119.
- Currie, J.R.L. (1968). The Portstewart Tramway. Locomotion Papers. Vol. 41. Lingfield: Oakwood Press.
- Currie, J.R.L. (1973). The Northern Counties Railway, Volume 1: 1845–1903. Newton Abbot: David & Charles. ISBN 0-7153-5934-7. (This, with volume 2, is the definitive history of the NCC)
- Currie, J.R.L. (1974). The Northern Counties Railway, Volume 2: 1903–1972. Newton Abbot: David & Charles. ISBN 0-7153-6530-4.
- Ellis, C. Hamilton (1970). London Midland & Scottish, A Railway in Retrospect. Shepperton: Ian Allan Ltd. ISBN 0-7110-0048-4. [For its essay on "The Irish Enclave"]
- Flanagan, Colm (2003). Diesel Dawn. Newtownards: Colourpoint Books. ISBN 1-904242-08-1. (For descriptions of NCC railcars and railbuses)
- Jenkinson, David; Essery, R.J. (1977). An Illustrated History of L.M.S. Coaches, 1923–1957. Oxford: Oxford Publishing Company. ISBN 0-902888-83-8.
- Financial Accounts and Statistical Returns. Belfast: London Midland and Scottish Railway Company (Northern Counties Committee). 1932.
- Appendix to the Working Time Table. Belfast: London Midland and Scottish Railway Company (Northern Counties Committee). 1934.
- McNeil, D.B (1969). Irish Passenger Steamship Services, Volume 1: North of Ireland. Newton Abbot: David & Charles. ISBN 0-7153-4341-6.
- Marshall, W.S. (1946). The Operating Department in Wartime. Belfast: LMS (NCC).
- Patterson, Edward M. (1965). The Ballycastle Railway, A History of the Narrow-Gauge Railways of North East Ireland: Part One. Newton Abbot: David & Charles.
- Patterson, Edward M. (1968). The Ballymena Lines, A History of the Narrow-Gauge Railways of North East Ireland: Part Two. Newton Abbot: David & Charles. ISBN 0-7153-4183-9.
- Railway Year Book 1912. London: Railway Publishing Company. 1912.
