= NCC Class X =

Northern Counties Committee (NCC) Class X locomotive. Harland and Wolff (H&W)

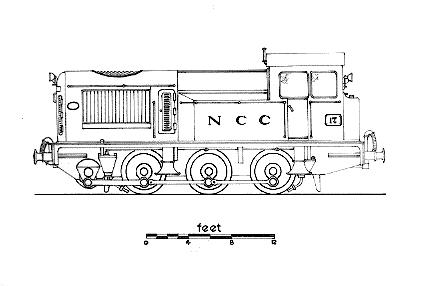
- Elevation of NCC Class X diesel-hydraulic locomotive No.17
Type and origin
- Power type: Diesel
- Builder: Harland & Wolff, Belfast
- Build date: 1936
Specifications
- Configuration
  - Whyte: 0-6-0
  - UIC: C
- Gauge: 5 ft 3 in (1,600 mm)
- Wheel diameter: 4 ft 1 1/2 in (1.257 m)
- Wheelbase: 12 ft 0 in (3.66 m)
- Length: 32 ft 4 1/2 in (9.87 m)
- Width: 9 ft 4 in (2.84 m)
- Height: 13 ft 1 in (3.99 m)
- Loco weight: 49 long tons (54.9 short tons; 49.8 t)
- Fuel capacity: 480 imp gal (2,200 L; 580 US gal)
- Engine type: 2-stroke Diesel
- Cylinders: 8
- Cylinder size: 135 mm × 220 mm (5.31 in × 8.66 in)
- Transmission: Hydraulic
Performance figures
- Maximum speed: 50 mph (80 km/h)
- Power output: 330 bhp (250 kW)
- Tractive effort: Low gear: 24,000 lb (11,000 kg); High gear: 7,200 lb (3,300 kg)
Career
- Operators: NCC / UTA / NIR
- Number in class: 1
- Numbers: 17
- Scrapped: 1970

The Northern Counties Committee (NCC) Class X was a solitary diesel-hydraulic shunting (switcher) locomotive built by Harland & Wolff (H&W) for service in the NCC's yards and at Belfast docks. It was one of several pioneering designs of diesel locomotive produced by H&W under their Harlandic trademark during the 1930s and 1940s.

== History ==
There was only one member of Class X, No.17. It was built by Harland and Wolff in Belfast and delivered to the NCC in 1936 under a lease arrangement; it was not actually taken into stock until 1941 when the NCC purchased it. No.17 had an 0-6-0 wheel arrangement and was powered by an eight-cylinder diesel engine developing 330 bhp (250 kW) at 1200 rpm.

Transmission was via a torque converter and a jackshaft final drive mounted ahead of the leading coupled wheels. In addition, there was a two-speed gearbox with ratios of 5.76:1 and 19.52:1 giving top speeds of 50 mph (80 km/h) and 15 mph (24 km/h) respectively in both forward and reverse. As delivered, it had its maker's trade name Harlandic on a plate just below the front headlight.

No.17 spent its career working out of the limelight on the Belfast Harbour Commissioners' lines at Belfast and within the NCC's own yards. It survived Ulster Transport Authority (UTA) ownership and entered Northern Ireland Railways stock in 1967 but saw little or no work before it was scrapped in mid-1970.

== Livery ==
Under NCC ownership, No.17 was painted black with red bufferbeams. It had brass number plates with red backgrounds which bore a highly stylised "17" in the same manner as the NCC steam engines. The initials "NCC" were applied to the side panels in shaded gold serif capitals.

When the UTA took over, No.17 was repainted black with vermilion and yellow lining. The UTA roundel replaced the "NCC" on the side panels.
