= NCC Class W =

Class of 2-6-0 mogul locomotive in Northern Ireland

Type and origin
- Power type: Steam
- Designer: H. P. Stewart
- Builder: LMS and NCC
- Build date: 1933
- Total produced: 15
Specifications
- Configuration
  - Whyte: 2-6-0
  - UIC: 1′C h2
- Gauge: 5 ft 3 in (1,600 mm) Irish gauge
- Coupled dia.: 6 ft 0 in (1.829 m)
- Loco weight: 62.5 long tons (63.5 t)(w.o.)
- Boiler pressure: 200 lbf/in^{2} (1.38 MPa)
- Cylinders: Two, outside
- Cylinder size: 19 in × 26 in (483 mm × 660 mm)
- Valve gear: Walschaerts
Performance figures
- Tractive effort: 22,160 lbf (98.57 kN)
Career
- Operators: NCC; UTA
- Numbers: 90–104
- Withdrawn: 1965
- Disposition: All original locomotives scrapped; one new-build under construction

The Northern Counties Committee (NCC) Class W was a class of locomotives introduced in 1933 and allocated to express passenger duties from York Road, Belfast.

== Design and build ==
The design was attributed to the NCC's Chief Mechanical Engineer H. P. Stewart who was with the permission of William Stanier able to draw on designs and parts from the NCC's owners, the London, Midland and Scottish Railway (LMS). The resultant design is understood to have been an Irish 5ft 3in gauge tender version of the LMS Fowler 2-6-4T tank engine with 6 feet 0 inches (1.83 m) diameter wheels which were three inches larger in diameter than its predecessor.

== Operations and performance ==
On introduction the Class W 2-6-0 'Moguls' took over the principal main line expresses of the NCC. They were able to reach speeds of over 80 miles per hour (130 km/h), while their coal consumption was considered extremely economical.

The class was the motive power for the North Atlantic Express introduced in 1934 with the opening of the Greenisland Loop Line and the fastest services to Portrush taking just 80 minutes. In 1937 the North Atlantic Express was scheduled from Ballymena to Belfast York Road at an average speed of 58.1 miles per hour (93.5 km/h) making it the fastest schedule in Ireland; that time was reduced by a further minute in 1938 to achieve a scheduled 60 miles per hour (97 km/h) start to stop.

The class remained on former NCC lines until the introduction of diesel railcars on services to Londonderry in 1958, after which some were transferred to other lines including cross border trains to Dundalk and occasional excursions to Dublin. The final six locomotives were withdrawn in 1965.

== Livery and naming ==
When new the locomotives were painted in LMS crimson lake red livery until the NCC was absorbed into Ulster Transport Authority (UTA) in the later forties whereafter repaints were black with red and yellow lining. The original plans were to name the class after Irish Chieftains, however there were concerns this might not be acceptable to some sections of the community. In the event the naming split between British Nobility and geographical locations, the class lead was named Duke of Abercorn after the governor of Northern Ireland.

No.	Name	Introduced	Withdrawn	Notes
90	Duke of Abercorn	1933		Class lead
91	The Bush			
92	The Bann			
93	The Foyle			
94	The Maine			
95	The Braid			
96	Silver Jubilee			
97	Earl of Ulster			
98	King Edward VIII			
99	King George VI			
100	Queen Elizabeth			
101				(not named)
102				(not named)
103				(not named)
104				(not named)
105				(not named)

== New build option ==
While none of the original class were preserved, the Railway Preservation Society of Ireland possess a spare set of driving wheels and motion for use constructing a replica, numbered 105 to continue where the original group left off. It will also use a spare tender that the group have numbered 43.

== See also ==
- Steam locomotives of the 21st century
