= NCC Class V =

Class of 3 two-cylinder 0-6-0 locomotives in Ireland

Type and origin
- Power type: Steam
- Builder: LMS Derby Works
- Build date: 1923
- Total produced: 3
Specifications
- Configuration
  - Whyte: 0-6-0
  - UIC: C
- Gauge: 5 ft 3 in (1,600 mm)
- Driver dia.: 62 1/4 in (1,581 mm)
- Fuel type: Coal
- Cylinders: Two, inside
- Cylinder size: 18 in × 24 in (457 mm × 610 mm)
Career
- Operators: NCC → UTA
- Numbers: 71–73 → X, Y, Z → 13–15
- Withdrawn: 1961–64
- Disposition: All scrapped

The NCC Class V was a 0-6-0 steam locomotive design used by the Northern Counties Committee (NCC) for goods train service.

Three were built at the NCC's parent company's Derby Works, and numbered 71–73. They were soon after "renumbered" X, Y and Z, to allow the class U locomotives to be renumbered into the 70–73 number block. The V class was then renumbered 13–15.

All passed to the Ulster Transport Authority (UTA) in 1949. Between 1951 and 1953, the UTA rebuilt them with Belpaire boilers and reclassified them as Class V1. They were withdrawn from service in 1961 (14 and 15) and 1964 (13). All were scrapped.

== See also ==
- GNRI Class V
