= Edward John Cotton =

Edward John Cotton (1 June 1829 – 14 June 1899) was an English accountant who became manager of the Waterford and Kilkenny Railway and, subsequently, the Belfast and Northern Counties Railway where he was influential in developing tourism in the north of Ireland.

== Biography ==
Edward John Cotton was born on 1 June 1829, at Rochester, Kent. The son of Edward and Hannah Cotton, he was christened on 24 June 1829, at the church of St Margaret, Rochester.

He entered railway service with the traffic department of the Great Western Railway at Paddington, London in October 1845. Two years later he became a clerk at the embryonic Railway Clearing House at a time when fewer than 20 railway companies were associated with it. There he gained a thorough knowledge of inter-company traffic and working arrangements. In 1851, he joined the North Eastern Railway where he was given the task of training the staff in Clearing House business.

In 1853, Cotton moved to Kilkenny in Ireland to become manager to the Waterford and Kilkenny Railway. He was 24 years old and one of the youngest railway managers in the British Isles.

He was appointed traffic manager of the Belfast and Ballymena Railway (B&BR) in 1857. The B&BR was aware of the importance of third-class traffic and, in 1859, Cotton gave instructions that third class tickets were to be issued from all stations, making the B&BR one of the first railways in the British Isles to do so.

The B&BR was renamed the Belfast and Northern Counties Railway (BNCR) in 1860 and during his tenure Cotton saw the BNCR greatly expand as it acquired other railways. Under his management, the BNCR became Ireland's most prosperous railway company. He was made a tempting offer to accept a position in India but the directors of the BNCR recognised Cotton's ability and his value to the company and raised his salary in order to retain him. Eventually Cotton would become the highest paid railway official in Ireland.

Cotton played a leading role in establishing the Larne-Stranraer steamer service in 1862 but it was not a success and closed after 14 months. However, Cotton did not relinquish the idea and was instrumental in the steamer's successful resurgence under private ownership in July 1872. He became the manager of the newly created Larne & Stranraer Steamship Joint Committee in 1893.

In addition to his service with the BNCR, he was concurrently manager of the Ballymena, Cushendall and Red Bay Railway from 1875 until 1884 when that line was acquired by the BNCR.

He was instrumental in developing tourism in the north of Ireland. He promoted the running of cheap excursion trains and was the driving force behind developing the tourist potential of Portrush where the BNCR acquired its first hotel, Glenariff, and Whitehead.

On 29 October 1895, Cotton celebrated the 50th year of his railway service, in honour of which he was presented with a portrait from the officers and staff of the BNCR and a valuable presentation from the directors.

Cotton married Rosina Harriott Lowe on 23 October 1852, at St Bride's Church in Fleet Street, London and their first child, John Lowe Cotton, was born on 20 September 1853.

He was chairman of the Managers' Conference at the Irish Railway Clearing House in Dublin from 1864; none of the other managers ever dreamed of assuming the position when he was present. This practice continued until 1890, when the principle of formal election to the chairmanship was established, a change Cotton accepted with equanimity.

He was closely associated with the Railway Benevolent Institution.

The government appointed Cotton as a general investigator under the Congested Districts Board for Connaught and it was largely due to him that the light railways or so-called "Balfour lines" in these areas were constructed.

He was well known in literary circles throughout the north of Ireland as an interpreter of Shakespeare and was himself featured in one of Amanda McKittrick Ros' remarkable novels, Delina Delaney, as "The Father of Steamy Enterprise".

Cotton died after a short illness on 14 June 1899. His death was a severe blow to the BNCR where he had been a more than able manager and had brought prosperity to the railway.
