= Ted Cotton =

Australian cricketer

Personal information
- Full name: Edward Kenneth Cotton
- Born: 8 August 1929; Sydney, Australia
- Died: 26 March 2002 (aged 72); Sydney, Australia
- Source: ESPNcricinfo, 25 December 2016

Ted Cotton (8 August 1929 – 26 March 2002) was an Australian cricketer. He played six first-class matches for New South Wales between 1952/53 and 1954/55.

== See also ==
- List of New South Wales representative cricketers
