= Coaches of the London, Midland and Scottish Railway =

The London, Midland and Scottish Railway (LMS) inherited several styles of coaching stock from its constituents. Stock built by the LMS itself can be categorised into three separate periods, numbered I to III.

== Coaches inherited from pre-grouping companies ==
Various types of coaches were inherited from pre-grouping companies.

=== Ex-Glasgow and South Western Railway ===
A 1914 seven-compartment side-corridor third built by Birmingham Railway Carriage and Wagon for the Glasgow and South Western Railway is preserved by the Scottish Railway Preservation Society at Falkirk.

=== Ex-Highland Railway ===
From 1897 bogie stock was generally introduced for main line services on the Highland Railway. However, six-wheelers appeared as late as 1908. An example of a six-wheel composite coupé, No. 89, latterly in service stock, is preserved by the Scottish Railway Preservation Society at Falkirk.

=== Ex-Lancashire & Yorkshire Railway ===
Many hundreds of carriages built for the L&Y (mainly at Newton Heath works) came into LMS stock, including some 6-wheel saloons. Newton Heath also built LMS designs for a few years in the 1920s. Currently two ex-L&Y carriages taken into LMS service have been preserved and restored for irregular public use on the Worth Valley Railway, although one is mounted on a BR underframe built at Wolverton in 1956. These are owned by the Lancashire & Yorkshire Railway Trust.

== Coaches built by the LMS ==
The design and building of LMS coaches followed a very standardised pattern. Very many types of coaches were built to suit the various services and needs but, in general, the progression of design features was a logical one. Three quite distinct periods of design can be recognised, the last of which continued until after nationalisation of the railways in Britain.

=== Period I (1923–1928/9) ===
The general styling of LMS Period I coaches followed much the same ideas as were prevalent elsewhere in Britain. They were wooden framed and panelled, had a fully beaded body with a semi-elliptical roof, doors to all compartments of side-corridor coaches, and were mounted on a steel underframe derived from the final Midland Railway design. Window ventilation was mainly by droplight. Roof ventilators were generally of the torpedo type. The coaches were fitted with non-automatic screw couplers and gangwayed stock made use of scissors-type British Standard pattern corridor connection (as also used on the Great Western Railway).

Most coaches ran on two four-wheel bogies which were of a 9 ft (2.7 m) wheelbase single bolster design which changed little over the company's existence. Some special vehicles ran on twelve wheel chassis and the six-wheel bogies on these had a 12 ft 6 in (3.81 m) wheelbase, based on the London and North Western Railway design. All coaches except kitchen cars were electrically lit and normally fitted with vacuum brake as standard.

Certain characteristic Midland Railway features were incorporated in the design of early LMS coaches which distinguished them from those of other lines. Most noticeable of these was the twin-window arrangement in each seating bay of the vestibule coaches. This took the form of two rectangular windows side by side (one fixed and one drop-light), rather than a single window or centre drop-light with two flanking quarterlight arrangement. There was generally a Stones pattern ventilator in the eaves panel above the fixed light of these window pairs.

During this period, the LMS company introduced a considerable quantity of conventional coaches which were comfortable and well built but whose designs were not particularly revolutionary. Externally, these early LMS coaches were extremely attractive in the fully panelled and beaded style and with the fully lined Crimson Lake livery.

The first indication of changing ideas were new corridor vehicles in 1927. For the first time, the LMS abandoned outside compartment doors in corridor coaches and introduced larger windows in their stead. At first there were two such windows in each compartment (one fixed and one frameless droplight) in the manner of the characteristic Midland pattern vestibule coaches already considered. They differed from the normal twin-window style in having frameless droplights and Stones ventilators over both windows and the style soon became adopted for other vehicles. By 1930 it had made its appearance in some composites, this time with but one Stones ventilator centrally over the window pair and with large 4 ft 6 in (1.37 m) wide corridor side windows.

The next development in the somewhat tentative progression towards more up to date amenity was the development of a single window per bay design which was introduced in 1928 with the building of ten very palatial carriages for inclusion in the Royal Scot and other prestige trains. Five of these coaches were semi-open firsts that had three compartments all finished in a different style with only four seats in each; each passenger thus had a corner seat. The open end was rather more conventional, seating 18 in two-and-one arrangement. These coaches were classed as dining vehicles and generally ran next to a kitchen car. The other five coaches were equally luxurious lounge brakes with accommodation for 10 first class passengers in eight individual armchairs and a settee. They again had large single windows instead of the two-window arrangement.

These 10 vehicles were followed in 1929 by a similarly styled batch of 25 neutral vestibule coaches for either first or third class passengers. These were 42-seaters with seven bays arranged two and one and again designated as dining vehicles. With these, the single window style could finally be said to have 'arrived' in LMS gangwayed coaches.

Although these 1928–29 coaches had single windows, they still had a high-waisted design with full exterior beading - as were most LMS coaches to this time - and some evidence suggests that despite being more appreciated than the earlier arrangement, the single window was not very easy to see out of because of the high waist. This was particularly apparent in the lounge brakes, which with their very low seated chairs were seemingly never very popular. Thus the single window design was not perpetuated in the high waisted style.

Some all-steel coaches were introduced in 1925–26. These were open thirds and brake thirds, together with a large number of full brakes, which were built by outside contractors, probably to assist the steel industry at that time. Construction apart, however, their two-window style and interior layout showed no advance on the other coaches of the time while externally they were finished in a pseudo fully beaded style.

=== Period II (1929–1932) ===
The start of the second phase in LMS carriage design was almost contemporary with the introduction of the previously mentioned high-waisted, single window designs and the new trend of thought was first exemplified by the appearance in 1929 of six luxury brake firsts with two-a-side compartment seating and somewhat palatial toilet accommodation.

These new carriages all had single windows but the waist of the coach was much lower than hitherto. The principal external difference was the elimination of the waist panel as result of deepening of windows. The new coaches were, however, still wood panelled and fully beaded and with the full lining represented very handsome designs. As with their Period I predecessors, these coaches went to the more important trains such as the Royal Scot.

This low waisted trend in design only partially set the pattern for new construction because corridor composites continued to come out in the fully beaded two-window style and the corridor thirds and brake thirds continued to have full compartment doors until 1930. Thus there was a certain amount of overlapping styles during the first part of the second period of LMS coach building.

It was again the vestibule coach which received the bulk of attention during this second phase. The first were a series of spacious 60 feet (18 m) long 42 seaters. Some of these, which were classified as dining vehicles were built as firsts but were downgraded a few years later on the advent of the Stanier 65 feet (20 m) firsts. They were followed by a 56 seater for general service. More 42 seat coaches followed which, although identical to the original 42 seaters, were not classed as diners. All these 60 feet (18 m) coaches had the new low waist and were wood panelled with full outside beading. However, a much larger group of low-waisted vestibule coaches was the 57 feet (17 m), 56 seat version of which 300 were built in 1931-2 and differed from the 60 feet (18 m) version in that they were steel clad with simulated external beading in paint. They did, however, follow the Period II style in all other respects and retained the raised window edge mouldings.

Eventually in 1930–31, the new low waisted style was adopted for all corridor stock too. Although mainly confined to composites and brake composites, it was a batch of corridor thirds in 1930 that really set new standards. There were only ten examples built, but they had only seven compartments on a 60 feet (18 m) underframe. Although the traditional four on each side seating was retained, the compartments were roughly 6 ft 6 in (1.98 m) between partitions. They were again wood panelled and fully beaded, and reported to be extremely comfortable. However no more were built, possibly due to low passenger capacity and that large numbers of the earlier designs had been built between 1924 and 1928. They were the only corridor thirds to be built to this length.

In terms of specialised coaching stock, this second design phase was represented mainly by dining cars (of which 36 were built) which made amends for the relatively few new examples during the first six years of the LMS. Like the 57 ft vestibule thirds, these diners were steel-panelled with painted simulated beading.

There were also two batches of 12-wheel composite sleeping cars built at this time that retained a high waist and certain LNWR styling, but were flush clad with frameless droplights. They were distinctly outside the main trend of LMS coach design.

Period 2 non-corridor stock differed little from the Period 1 examples.

=== Period III (1933 onwards) ===
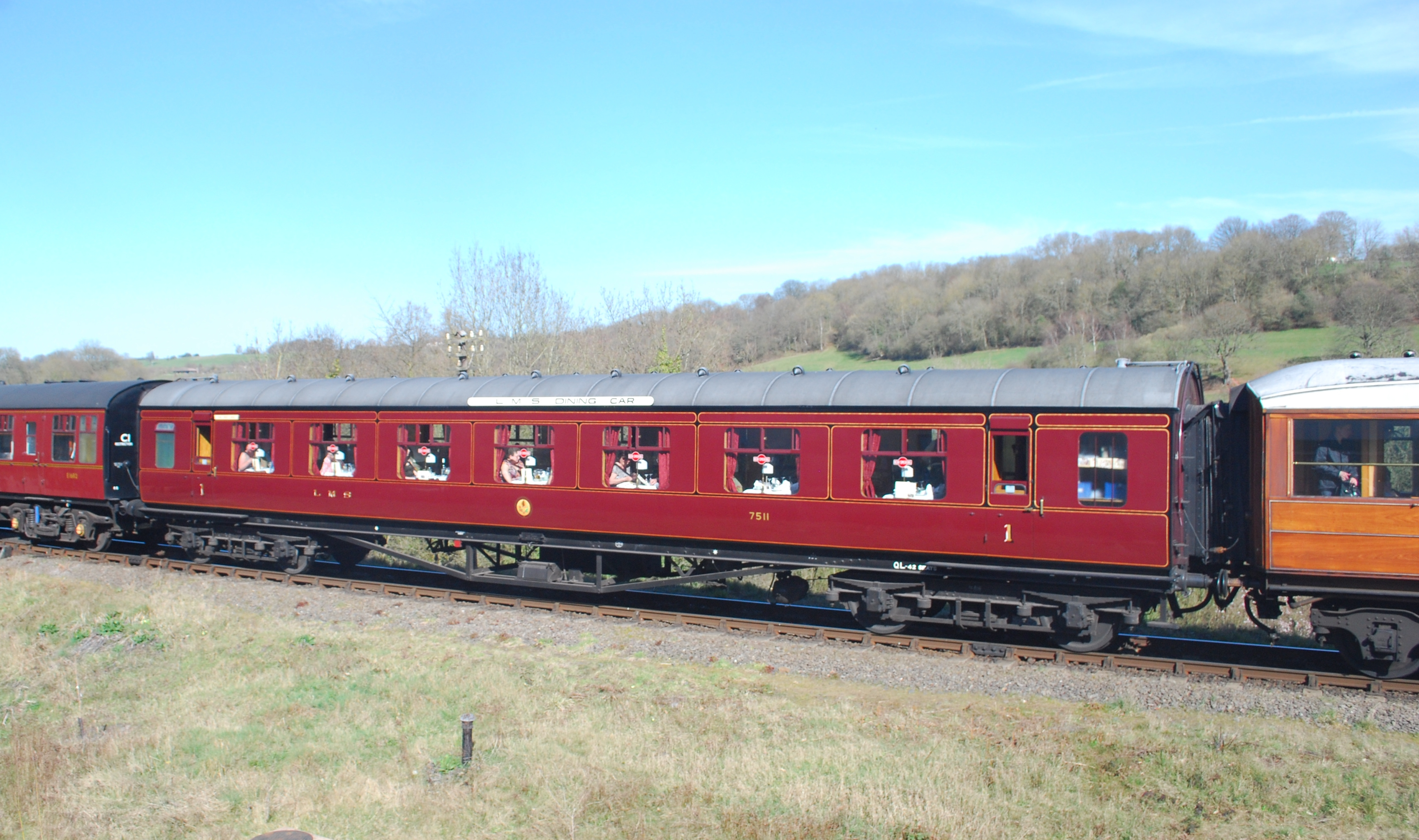
LMS Stanier 65' "QL" (BR "RFO") First Class Vestibule Diner No.7511 built at Wolverton 1934, Diagram 1902, Lot 734. In 1929 partially-simplified lined Crimson Lake livery. At Highley, Severn Valley Railway, 03/12

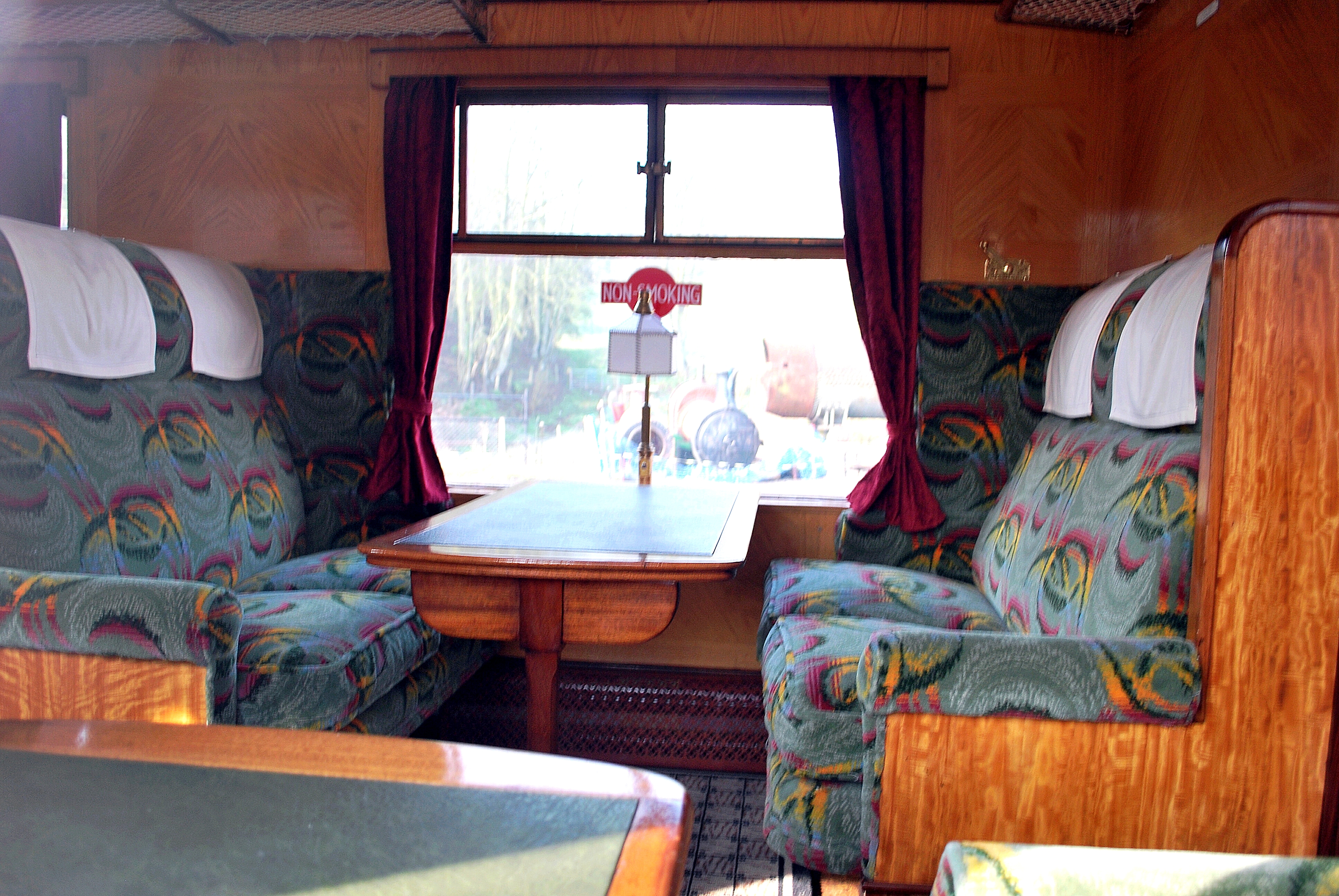
First Class interior (seen through the window glass) of LMS Stanier 65' "QL" (BR "RFO") First Class Vestibule Diner No.7511

In 1932, William Stanier took up his appointment as Chief Mechanical Engineer to the LMS and the first of the completely flush sided LMS coaches emerged soon enough after his assumption of office to lead to the coaches ever afterwards being referred to as "Stanier" stock.

The LMS flush sided coach, of which many examples still remained as late as 1967–8, differed in appearance from its predecessors mainly in the shape of its windows which now exhibited well-rounded corners. All the earlier coaches had, of course, been built with slightly rounded window corner mouldings but by comparison with Stanier vehicles, the Period I and II coach window was almost square cornered. The second major visible difference was also in the window area. During Period I, the favoured method of admitting fresh air was the droplight which was frequently supplemented by and finally (in Period II) in large measure superseded by the Stones and Dewel pattern glass vane ventilator.

With the Stanier stock was introduced the now familiar sliding ventilator incorporated in the upper part of the window. Initially this was quite shallow with only one section moveable but in 1934 this was replaced by a deeper ventilator with two wide sliding sections which remained almost until the end. From about 1947–8, the sliding portions were somewhat shortened and in this form were retained as a feature of the British Railways (BR) standard coach.

During the Stanier period, non-corridor coaches varied little from the pattern laid down in the 1920s except for the flush clad exterior. The design was still high waisted and the seating arrangements never changed from the earlier years. No inter district lavatory sets were built during the Stanier regime and apart from a few lavatory composites for the London Tilbury and Southend section, all the Stanier non-corridor stock was of the suburban type. There was an interesting batch of articulated triplets made in 1938 but these do not seem to have been very popular.

== Post Nationalisation ==
LMS design coaches continued to be built for several years after 1947 until the introduction of the British Railways Mark 1. This short-lived period was, in fact, little more than a continuation of the Stanier era and was not really a new phase in the same sense that the flush sided stock itself was. Later corridor coaches have, however, been distinguished by the name "Porthole" stock by virtue of the circular toilet window feature which they introduced. This stock actually commenced building a year or two after 1947 and was, therefore, not strictly LMS stock as such but it was in the direct tradition of LMS coach building practice and has, therefore, been included here. It differed from the last versions of the Stanier stock proper (which themselves were built well into BR days) principally in the circular toilet windows which replaced the earlier rectangular ones, but also in having post-war torpedo ventilators and the final style of sliding window ventilators.

== Preservation ==
- The Severn Valley Railway has a complete rake of Period III coaches. RFO No. 7511 has also been restored for use on the railway's dining trains.
- The LMS Carriage Association (link) also owns several coaches, most of which are based at Peak Rail, although two (27162 and 27001), are based at the Ecclesbourne Valley Railway.
- Whole sets of Period I, II and III in varying states have been preserved across the U.K. The Midland Railway Butterley has possibly the most varied and unique collection, but others include the Bo'ness and Kinneil Railway, which has three Period III coaches on display, and the Strathspey Railway, which has two Period III coaches, although these are currently not in use.
- Two suburban coaches survive on the Keighley and Worth Valley Railway, both currently out of use and not on public display. One is a 9-compartment third built in 1938 and purchased directly from BR passenger service in the 1960s, the other a composite built to LMS design in 1951 and used as a departmental mess van by BR.

== Models ==
2 mm scale (N gauge)

- Graham Farish (Bachmann ownership) modelled P3 57' varieties, brake first, vestibule first, composite vestibule, corridor third, vestibule third, brake third and inspection saloon.
- Mike Howarth produced a run or rtr Series 3 coaching stock.

3.5 mm scale (HO gauge)

- Rivarossi produced Period II coaches.

4 mm scale (00 gauge)

- Bachmann Branchline produce some Period I coaches and a Period III gangwayed brake van.
- Hornby Railways produce some Period III coaches and a Period II restaurant car.
- Comet Models (link) produce a wide range of kits for all periods.

7 mm scale (0 gauge)

- Sidelines (link) produce a range of kits.
- MTH (link) produced a limited range of Ready-to-Run Period III corridor coaches including All 1st, Brake 1st, Open 3rd and Full Brake.

== Bibliography ==
- Harris, Michael (1976). Preserved Railway Coaches. Shepperton: Ian Allan Ltd. ISBN 0-7110-0664-4.
- David Jenkinson & Robert J. "Bob" Essery (1977). LMS Coaches 1923-57 Oxford Publishing Company. ISBN 0-902888-83-8
- David Jenkinson & Robert J. "Bob" Essery (1991) LMS Standard Coaching Stock. Vol 1: General Introduction & Non-Passenger Coaching Stock Oxford Publishing Company ISBN 0-86093-450-0
- David Jenkinson & Robert J. "Bob" Essery (1994) LMS Standard Coaching Stock. Vol 2: General Service Gangwayed Vehicles. Oxford Publishing Company. ISBN 0-86093-451-9
- David Jenkinson & Robert J. "Bob" Essery (2000) LMS Standard Coaching Stock. Vol 3: Non-Corridor & Special Purpose Vehicles. Oxford Publishing Company. ISBN 0-86093-452-7
