= NCC Class A1 =

Class of Northern Irish 4-4-0 locomotives

Type and origin
- Power type: Steam
- Builder: BNCR / NCC, York Road works, Belfast; MR, Derby Works
- Build date: 1901–1908
- Rebuilder: NCC, York Road works, Belfast
- Rebuild date: 1927–1936
Specifications
- Configuration
  - Whyte: 4-4-0
  - UIC: 2'Bh
- Gauge: 5 ft 3 in (1,600 mm)
- Leading dia.: 3 ft 0 in (0.914 m)
- Driver dia.: 6 ft 0 in (1.829 m)
- Wheelbase: 40 ft 11 in (12.47 m) including tender
- Length: 49 ft 7 3/4 in (15.13 m)
- Width: 8 ft 4 in (2.54 m)
- Height: 13 ft 2 in (4.01 m)
- Axle load: 16 long tons 8 cwt (36,700 lb or 16,646.8 kg)
- Adhesive weight: 30 long tons 9 cwt (68,200 lb or 30,900 kg)
- Loco weight: 46 long tons 7 cwt (103,800 lb or 47,100 kg)
- Total weight: 75 long tons 4 cwt (168,400 lb or 76,400 kg)
- Fuel type: Coal
- Fuel capacity: 6.0 long tons (6.1 t; 6.7 short tons)
- Water cap.: 2,090 imp gal (9,500 L; 2,510 US gal); No.34: 2,590 imp gal (11,800 L; 3,110 US gal); No.62: 2,690 imp gal (12,200 L; 3,230 US gal)
- Boiler pressure: 200 psi (1.38 MPa)
- Heating surface
  - Firebox: 103 sq ft (9.6 m^{2})
  - Tubes: 508.7 sq ft (47.26 m^{2})
  - Total surface: 1,038 sq ft (96.4 m^{2})
- Superheater
  - Heating area: 233.7 sq ft (21.71 m^{2})
- Cylinders: Two
- Cylinder size: 18 in × 24 in (457 mm × 610 mm)
- Valve gear: Walschaerts
- Train brakes: Automatic vacuum
Performance figures
- Tractive effort: 18,360 lbf (81.7 kN)
Career
- Operators: LMS NCC / UTA
- Number in class: 9
- Nicknames: Whippet
- Scrapped: 1947–1954

The LMS (Northern Counties Committee) Class A1 4-4-0 passenger steam locomotives were rebuilds of Belfast and Northern Counties Railway Class A two-cylinder compound locomotives. They operated services throughout the NCC’s 5 ft 3 in (1,600 mm) broad gauge system in the north-east of Ireland.

== History ==
The Class A1 locomotives were rebuilds of the Class A "Heavy Compounds" that had been designed by the BNCR Locomotive Engineer Bowman Malcolm. The first Class A locomotive had been built by the BNCR at York Road, Belfast in 1901 shortly before amalgamation with the Midland Railway and building continued with the Midland Railway constructing six at their Derby works. The locomotives were built as two-cylinder compounds using the Worsdell-von Borries system, the high pressure cylinders having a diameter of 18 inches (457 mm) and low pressure ones of 26 inches (660 mm), both with 24 inches (610 mm) stroke.

Following the end of World War I the state of the locomotives operating in Northern Ireland was well below that which was needed to run the services effectively; many needed replacing but, however, cost was a major factor. It was decided to implement a "Renewal Programme" in which, not only would new locomotives be built but also suitable classes of locomotives would be rebuilt, in the main following the style of the Midland Railway and the LMS.

As part of this "Renewal Programme" members of Class A were rebuilt as two-cylinder simples (i.e. not compounds). Those reclassified as Class A1 were rebuilt with a Midland Railway type RG6 boiler and new cylinders both of 18 inches (457 mm) diameter by 24 inches (610 mm) stroke. The boiler was higher pitched than the original to allow the firebox and ash pan to clear the rear driving wheel axle and an extension of 24.75 inches (630 mm) to the smokebox saddle was needed to offer support. Although the effect was less striking than that of the similarly rebuilt Class B3, the modified appearance was such that these locomotives would be included among those that gained the nickname of "Whippet" because of a perceived resemblance to the racing dog.

All the class were officially named after mountains although that allocated to No. 58, Lurigethan, was never carried.

The majority of the Class A1 engines were coupled to what was known as the "Standard" tender which could carry 6 long tons (6.1 t) of coal and 2,090 imperial gallons (9,500 L; 2,510 US gal) of water. No.34, however, ran with one of the three "Medium" tenders that had a 2,590 imperial gallons (11,800 L; 3,110 US gal) water capacity and No.62 acquired a spare built up tender with a capacity of 2,690 imperial gallons (12,200 L; 3,230 US gal). No.58 acquired a tender cab which led to her being a regular visitor on the Dungiven branch where tender first running was required.

Nos.33, 58 and 69 later received boilers with a working pressure of 200 psi (1.38 MPa) in place of 160 psi (1.10 MPa). This led to their being allocated to the Belfast area during the late 1930s where duties were more onerous. No.33 was shedded at York Road while the other two were at Larne.

No.65 worked in a spare capacity at York Road and No.62 was based at Cookstown.

The builders plates showing dates in the late 1920s and early 1930s belied the age of these engines and the heavy traffic that they handled during World War II showed up their weaknesses more than newly built locomotives. Nevertheless, the majority of the class survived to be taken into Ulster Transport Authority stock and were scrapped in the mid 1950s.

=== Building and withdrawal data ===
Rebuilding and naming information for the members of Class A1 are shown in the table below:

Number	Builder	Built	Rebuilt	Name as rebuilt	Scrapped/Sold
33	York Rd	July 1902	December 1928	Binevanagh	November 1949
34	York Rd	April 1901	April 1928	Knocklayd	October 1950
58	York Rd	January 1907	February 1934	Lurigethan*	August 1954
62	York Rd	August 1903	July 1928	Slemish	August 1954
64	Derby	May 1905	August 1929	Trostan	August 1954
65	Derby	May 1905	June 1929	Knockagh	October 1950
66	Derby	May 1905	May 1930	Ben Madigan	August 1954
68	Derby	June 1908	December 1927	Slieve Gallion	November 1947
69	York Rd	December 1904	June 1933	Slieve Bane	August 1954

* Allocated the name shown but this was never carried.

== Livery ==
=== LMS NCC ===
The Class A1 locomotives were painted in crimson lake with yellow and black lining. The LMS crest was carried on the upper cab sides. The initials "NCC" in shaded serif gold capital letters were placed centrally on the tender sides. Number plates were brass with raised digits and edge; they were carried on the lower cab sides with another placed centrally on the back of the tender tank. On the named engines, curved nameplates were fitted above the leading driving wheel splashers. Buffer beams and number plate and name plate backgrounds were painted red. The engine number was applied to the front buffer beam in shaded gold digits.

During World War II, the locomotives were painted black with red buffer beams and number plate and name plate backgrounds providing relief.

=== UTA ===
Under the Ulster Transport Authority, the engines were painted black with vermilion and yellow lining. Buffer beams, name and number plate backgrounds were red and the practice of putting the number on the front buffer beam was continued.

The UTA roundel, 14 inches (356 mm) in diameter, with "Ulster Transport" in orange block capitals, lined in red, surrounding a white shield bearing the red hand of Ulster, all on a mid-green background, was placed in the middle of the tender sides.
