= Whippet (disambiguation) =

A whippet is a medium-sized sighthound.

Whippet may also refer to:

== Vehicles ==
- Whippet (A1 locomotive), a 4-4-0 passenger steam locomotive
- Whippet (B3 locomotive), a 4-4-0 passenger steam locomotive
- Whippet (bicycle), an 1880s safety bicycle
- Whippet (car), a brand of small cars
- Austin Whippet, a British single-seat light aircraft
- Blériot-Whippet, a British four-wheeled cyclecar
- Medium Mark A Whippet, a British tank
- USS Whippet, the name of more than one United States Navy ship

== Other uses ==
- Ashley Whippet (1971–1985), a Whippet owned by Alex Stein of Ohio
- Whipped-cream charger, a steel cylinder or cartridge filled with nitrous oxide also referred to as a "whippet" or "whippit"
  - Recreational use of nitrous oxide, abuse of "whippet" cartridges
- Whippet cookie, a chocolate-coated marshmallow treat
- Whippet (bus company), in Cambridgeshire, England
- Whippet Field, a private-use airport in Oregon

== See also ==
- Whip It (disambiguation), including Whippit
