= NCC Class S2 =

Two-cylinder compound 2-4-4T locomotive

Type and origin
- Power type: Steam
- Builder: Beyer, Peacock & Company, Manchester
- Build date: 1892
- Rebuilder: NCC York Road Works, Belfast
- Rebuild date: 1931
- Number rebuilt: 1
Specifications
- Configuration
  - Whyte: 2-4-4T
  - UIC: 1′B2′ h2vt
- Gauge: 3 ft (914 mm)
- Leading dia.: 2 ft 0 in (0.610 m)
- Driver dia.: 3 ft 9 in (1.143 m)
- Trailing dia.: 2 ft 0 in (0.610 m)
- Wheelbase: 24 ft 9 in (7.54 m)
- Length: 31 ft 9 1/2 in (9.69 m)
- Width: 7 ft 9 1/2 in (2.37 m)
- Height: 10 ft 1 1/4 in (3.08 m)
- Axle load: 11 long tons 8 cwt (25,500 lb or 11.6 t)
- Adhesive weight: 22 long tons 16 cwt (51,100 lb or 23.2 t)
- Loco weight: 41 long tons 1 cwt (92,000 lb or 41.7 t)
- Fuel type: Coal
- Fuel capacity: 1.125 long tons (1.143 t)
- Water cap.: 570 imperial gallons (2,600 L; 680 US gal)
- Boiler: LMS type G6S
- Boiler pressure: 200 lbf/in^{2} (1.4 MPa)
- Heating surface
  - Firebox: 83 sq ft (7.7 m^{2})
  - Tubes: 742 sq ft (68.9 m^{2})
  - Total surface: 825 sq ft (76.6 m^{2})
- Cylinders: Two, outside, compound
- High-pressure cylinder: LHS: 14 3/4 in × 20 in (375 mm × 508 mm)
- Low-pressure cylinder: RHS: 21 in × 20 in (533 mm × 508 mm)
- Valve gear: Walschaerts
- Loco brake: Steam
- Train brakes: Automatic vacuum
Performance figures
- Tractive effort: 16,438 lbf (73.1 kN)
Career
- Operators: Northern Counties Committee
- Numbers: 110
- Scrapped: February 1946

The Northern Counties Committee (NCC) Class S2 was a solitary two-cylinder compound 2-4-4T steam locomotive that was introduced for service on the 3 ft (914 mm) narrow gauge railways of County Antrim in north-east Ireland. It was heavily rebuilt from a BNCR Class S locomotive by the addition of a standard gauge boiler.

== History ==
There was only one member of Class S2, No.110. It was an extensive rebuild by the NCC of a BNCR Class S 2-4-4T Worsdell-von Borries two-cylinder compound locomotive that had been built in 1892. It had outside cylinders and Walschaerts valve gear with the smaller diameter high-pressure cylinder on the left and the larger low-pressure one on the right.

During rebuilding in 1931, a modified standard gauge G6S boiler was installed; this was 7 ft (2.1 m) longer and 6 3/4 in (170 mm) greater in diameter than the original and had a working pressure of 200psi. To accommodate this, the overall length of the locomotive was increased by slightly less than four feet. The trailing radial truck was replaced by four-wheel bogie and a rear bunker was fitted which held one and a half tons of coal. The weight was increased by 10 1/4 tons.

The modification, which was carried out at York Road works in Belfast, was not a success. No. 110 was too rigid on curves and derailed frequently. It slipped badly and although the tractive effort had been raised from 13,150 to 16,435 lbf (58.49 to 73.11 kN), the extra power could not be fully utilised. As a result, the locomotive saw little use, running only 3,000 miles (4,800 km) in 1934. It was briefly pressed into service during World War II but was not used after 1941 and was withdrawn in February 1946.

== Technical details ==
When starting the locomotive from rest, a simpling valve was opened which admitted steam directly from the boiler to the low-pressure cylinder as well as the high-pressure one. Not only did this provide maximum tractive effort when starting but also avoided problems that might arise if the high-pressure piston was in a dead centre position. Once moving, the simpling valve was closed and the locomotive continued in compound operation.

== Livery ==
After being rebuilt to Class S2, No.110 was painted in LMS maroon. The smokebox was black and the buffer beam was red. The LMS (NCC) crest was carried on the cab side-sheet. The initials "NCC" in shaded serif gold capital letters were sited on the side tanks, ahead of the number plates which had red backgrounds. The lining was as follows:

- Panel: maroon
- 3/8 in (9.5 mm) line: yellow ochre, square corners
- 2 1/2–3 in (64–76 mm) band: black, square corners
- Edge

During the BNCR renumbering of 1897, No.110 had received number plates in the series which had "BNCR" in small block capitals above the digits. When it was rebuilt to Class S2, instructions were given that the letters "BNCR" were to be milled off the number plates and in consequence the numbers appeared offset towards the bottom of the plate.
