= GER Class 127 =

Type and origin
- Power type: Steam
- Designer: Thomas William Worsdell and/or James Holden
- Builder: Stratford Works
- Order number: DP203
- Build date: 1888
- Total produced: 1
Specifications
- Configuration
  - Whyte: 0-6-0
  - UIC: C n2v
- Gauge: 4 ft 8 1/2 in (1,435 mm)
- Driver dia.: 4 ft 10 in (1.473 m)
- Fuel type: Coal
- Cylinders: Two, inside, compound
- High-pressure cylinder: 18 in × 24 in (457 mm × 610 mm)
- Low-pressure cylinder: 26 in × 24 in (660 mm × 610 mm)
- Valve gear: Stephenson
Career
- Operators: Great Eastern Railway
- Numbers: 127, 935 from 1890
- Disposition: Rebuilt as Class N31 in 1895, withdrawn and scrapped in 1913

The GER Class 127 was a class of a solitary experimental 0-6-0 compound steam locomotive built by the Great Eastern Railway at its Stratford Works in 1888. It was rebuilt as a simple locomotive in 1895, and withdrawn in 1913.

== History ==
The locomotive, numbered 127, emerged from Stratford Works in 1888, having been built to a 'Departmental and Personal' account (DP203) rather than the normal 'letter' account, indicating its experimental status.

It was designed using the two-cylinder Worsdell/Von Borries compound system, and therefore its initial design may have been by Thomas William Worsdell, before he left the Great Eastern Railway for the Locomotive Superintendency of the North Eastern Railway in 1885.

The locomotive had an 18-inch (457 mm) diameter high-pressure cylinder, and a 26-inch (660 mm) diameter low-pressure cylinder; both had a 24-inch (610 mm) stroke. This arrangement was the same as that used on the Class G16 passenger 4-4-0 locomotives.

It was reboilered and renumbered 935 in 1890, and rebuilt as a simple-expansion locomotive in 1895, whereupon it was considered part of the Class N31, and was withdrawn in 1913.
