= NCC Class S1 =

Type and origin
- Power type: Steam
- Designer: S. Rendall
- Builder: NCC, York Road works, Belfast
- Build date: 1908–1909
- Rebuilder: NCC
- Rebuild date: 1928–1930
- Number rebuilt: 2
Specifications
- Configuration
  - Whyte: 2-4-2T
  - UIC: 1′B1 n2vt
- Gauge: 3 ft (914 mm)
- Leading dia.: 2 ft 0 in (0.610 m)
- Driver dia.: 3 ft 9 in (1.143 m)
- Trailing dia.: 2 ft 0 in (0.610 m)
- Wheelbase: 22 ft 3 in (6.78 m)
- Length: 29 ft 9 7/8 in (9.09 m)
- Width: 7 ft 4 in (2.24 m)
- Height: 9 ft 8 in (2.95 m)
- Axle load: 10 long tons 0 cwt (22,400 lb or 10.2 t)
- Adhesive weight: 20 long tons 0 cwt (44,800 lb or 20.3 t)
- Loco weight: 33 long tons 0 cwt (73,900 lb or 33.5 t)
- Fuel type: Coal
- Fuel capacity: 1.0 long ton (1.0 t)
- Water cap.: 570 imperial gallons (2,600 L; 680 US gal)
- Boiler pressure: 160 psi (1.10 MPa)
- Heating surface
  - Firebox: 58.2 sq ft (5.41 m^{2})
  - Tubes: 614.8 sq ft (57.12 m^{2})
  - Total surface: 673 sq ft (62.5 m^{2})
- Cylinders: Two, left: HP; right: LP
- High-pressure cylinder: 14 3/4 in × 20 in (375 mm × 508 mm)
- Low-pressure cylinder: 21 in × 20 in (533 mm × 508 mm)
- Valve gear: Walschaerts
- Loco brake: Steam
- Train brakes: Automatic vacuum
Performance figures
- Tractive effort: 13,150 lbf (58.5 kN)
Career
- Operators: Northern Counties Committee; → Ulster Transport Authority
- Numbers: 101, 102 → 41, 42
- Scrapped: February 1954

The Northern Counties Committee (NCC) Class S1 was a class of two-cylinder compound 2-4-2T steam locomotives that was introduced for service on the 3 ft (910 mm) narrow gauge railways of County Antrim in north-east Ireland. The members of the class were rebuilds of the BNCR Class S.

== History ==
The Class S1 was a class of two locomotives that were rebuilt by the LMS (NCC) from BNCR Class S Worsdell-von Borries two-cylinder compound locomotives. They had outside cylinders and Walschaerts valve gear with the smaller diameter high-pressure cylinder on the left and the larger low-pressure one on the right.

The rebuilding was carried out to increase the coal capacity by fitting a bunker behind the cab. This was accommodated by increasing the length of the radial truck, the wheelbase and overall length of the locomotives by two feet. On the modified engines the coal capacity was nominally unaltered at one long ton but the bunker enabled their footplates to be kept free from coal and improved working conditions in the rather cramped cabs. The weight was increased by 1 long ton 3 cwt (2,600 lb or 1.2 t).

No.101 (ex-113) was rebuilt as Class S1 in 1928 and No.102 (ex-112) was rebuilt in 1930.

No.101 was renumbered No.41 in June 1939 and spent most of its later career on the Ballycastle line. During the harsh winter of 1947, No.41 famously became stuck in a snow drift between Capecastle and Armoy while working the afternoon up train to Ballymena on 12 March. Passengers and train crew spent the night in the guard's van (which had a stove) and while the passengers were rescued by a relief train on the following day, it was not until two days later that No.41 and her train were finally freed from the snow drifts.

No.102 also worked for a while on the Ballycastle line before spending its last years working between Larne and Ballyclare paper mill. It was renumbered No.42 in March 1942. Nos 41 and 42 were scrapped in February 1954.

== Technical details ==
When starting a locomotive from rest, a simpling valve was opened which admitted steam directly from the boiler to the low-pressure cylinder as well as the high-pressure one. Not only did this provide maximum tractive effort when starting but also avoided problems that might arise if the high-pressure piston was in a dead centre position. Once moving, the simpling valve was closed and the locomotive continued in compound operation.

== Livery ==
=== LMS (NCC) ===
After rebuilding to Class S1, Nos. 101 and 102 were outshopped in LMS livery. They were painted in LMS maroon. The smokebox was black and the buffer beam was red. The LMS (NCC) crest was carried on the cab side-sheet. The initials "NCC" were sited on the side tanks in shaded serif gold capitals, placed ahead of the number plates. The number plate backgrounds were painted red. The lining was as follows:

- Panel: maroon
- 3/8 in (9.5 mm) line: yellow ochre, square corners
- 2 1/2–3 in (64–76 mm) band: black, square corners
- Edge

During World War II, the engines were painted unlined black. Only the red buffer beams and number plate backgrounds relieved the somber effect.

=== UTA ===
Under the Ulster Transport Authority, the narrow-gauge engines, for which there was no long-term future, continued in the unrelieved black wartime colour scheme. This was eventually enlivened on Nos.41 (ex-101) and 42 (ex-102) by vermilion and yellow lining:

- Panel: black
- 3/8 in (9.5 mm) line: vermilion, square corners
- 1 in (25 mm) band: black, square corners
- 1/4 in (6.4 mm) line: yellow, square corners

The UTA roundel, 14-inch (360 mm) in diameter, with "Ulster Transport" in orange block capitals, lined in red, surrounding a white shield bearing the red hand of Ulster, all on a mid-green background, was placed in the middle of the side tanks, in line with the dome, on Nos. 41 and 42.
