= BNCR Class A =

Class of compound 4-4-0 locomotives

- BNCR 3 King Edward VII at York Road
Type and origin
- Power type: Steam
- Builder: BNCR/NCC, York Road Works, Belfast; Midland Railway, Derby Works
- Build date: 1901–1908
- Total produced: 13
- Rebuilder: LMS (NCC)
- Rebuild date: 1927–1936
Specifications
- Configuration
  - Whyte: 4-4-0
- Gauge: 5 ft 3 in (1,600 mm)
- Leading dia.: 3 ft 0 in (0.914 m)
- Driver dia.: 6 ft 0 in (1.829 m)
- Wheelbase: 40 ft 11 in (12.47 m)
- Length: 49 ft 7 3/4 in (15.13 m)
- Width: 8 ft 4 in (2.54 m)
- Height: 13 ft 2 in (4.01 m)
- Axle load: 15.30 long tons (15.55 t; 17.14 short tons)+ 14.45 long tons (14.68 t; 16.18 short tons)
- Adhesive weight: 29.75 long tons (30.23 t; 33.32 short tons)
- Loco weight: 45.05 long tons (45.77 t; 50.46 short tons)
- Tender weight: 28.85 long tons (29.31 t; 32.31 short tons)
- Fuel type: Coal
- Fuel capacity: 6.00 long tons (6.10 t; 6.72 short tons)
- Water cap.: 2,090 imp gal (9,500 L; 2,510 US gal)
- Boiler pressure: 175 psi (1.21 MPa)
- Heating surface
  - Firebox: 106 sq ft (9.8 m^{2})
  - Tubes: 824 sq ft (76.6 m^{2})
  - Total surface: 930 sq ft (86 m^{2})
- Cylinders: Two
- High-pressure cylinder: LHS: 18 in × 24 in (457 mm × 610 mm)
- Low-pressure cylinder: RHS: 26 in × 24 in (660 mm × 610 mm)
- Valve gear: Walschaerts
- Train brakes: Automatic vacuum
Performance figures
- Tractive effort: 16,065 lbf (71.5 kN)
- Factor of adh.: 4.15
Career
- Operators: BNCR; NCC (LMS)
- Scrapped: 1947–1954

The Belfast and Northern Counties Railway (BNCR) Class A was a class of 13 two-cylinder compound steam locomotives built for service in north-east Ireland. The first two members of the class would be the last locomotives to be built for the independent BNCR, being completed before its purchase by the Midland Railway in 1903. The members of the class were rebuilt by the LMS (NCC) becoming either Class A1 or Class U2 depending on how they had been modified.

== History ==
The BNCR had standardised on locomotives with a 2-4-0 wheel arrangement for its passenger locomotives during the 1870s and construction continued through to the mid-1890s. However, with increasing loads and heavier trains the limitations of this wheel arrangement became apparent. The first purpose-built 4-4-0s, the Class B "Light Compounds", had been in introduced in 1897 but something more powerful was needed to supplement the two Class D "Heavy Compounds" that were rebuilt to 4-4-0s at the same time.

The Class A locomotives were designed by the BNCR Locomotive Engineer Bowman Malcolm and were the last design of broad gauge locomotives to be built for the independent Belfast and Northern Counties Railway, the first two being completed before its purchase by the Midland Railway in 1903.

The first Class A Engine was No.34 which was outshopped from York Road in April 1901 and named Queen Alexandra. The second of the class, which had the distinction of being the last locomotive to be built by the BNCR, was No.3, King Edward VII, which was completed fifteen months later in July 1902. Building continued over a seven-year period after the take-over of the company by the Midland Railway. Six locomotives were constructed at the Midland Railway's Derby Works and the remainder at York Road works.

The locomotives were built as two-cylinder compounds using the Worsdell-von Borries system, having an 18-inch (457 mm) high-pressure cylinder and a 26-inch (660 mm) diameter low-pressure cylinder, each with 24-inch (610 mm) stroke. Inside Walschaerts valve gear was fitted which was standard on the BNCR. The driving wheels were of 6 ft (1.829 m) diameter. The only visible difference between the two builders was the number of spokes on the bogie wheels, the Belfast-built batch had nine spokes while those built at Derby had ten.

Two main, and visibly obvious, changes were made to the locomotives when in traffic, viz: the fitting of Manson automatic tablet exchange apparatus for working single lines, and a rearwards projecting extension of the cab roof, offering more protection for the crew.

The Class A engines were coupled to what was known as the "Standard" tender which could carry 6 long tons (6.1 t; 6.7 short tons) of coal and 2,090 imperial gallons (9,500 L; 2,510 US gal) of water.

Five members of the class were renumbered between 1924 and 1927 when Nos. 3, 4, 5, 9 and 17 became Nos. 33, 62, 59, 69 and 58 respectively.

=== Rebuilding ===
Following the end of World War I the state of the locomotives operating in Northern Ireland was well below that which was needed to run the services effectively; much needed replacing but, however, cost was a major factor. It was decided to implement a "Renewal Programme" in which, not only new locomotives would be built but suitable classes of locomotives would be rebuilt, in the main following the style of the Midland and LMS railways. As part of this "Renewal Programme" all members of Class A were rebuilt between 1928 and 1936.

Dependent upon the modifications carried out, they were reclassified as either Class A1 or Class U2. Those classified as Class A1 were rebuilt with a Midland Railway type RG6 boiler and new cylinders of 18-by-24-inch (457 mm × 610 mm) diameter x stroke and retained some recognisable features. Those that were rebuilt as Class U2 underwent a more radical alteration and may have incorporated little of the original engines.

Details of the delivery, renumbering and rebuilding of the class are shown in the table below:

No.	Builder	Date	Name	Re-No./ Date	Rebuilt	New No.	New Class	New Name	Scrapped/ Sold	Notes
34	York Rd	April 1901	Queen Alexandra		April 1928		A1	Knocklayd	October 1950	†*
3	York Rd	July 1902	King Edward VII	33 (1926)	December 1928		A1	Binevanagh	November 1949	†
4	York Rd	August 1903		62 (1924)	July 1928		A1	Slemish	August 1954	
9	York Rd	December 1904		69 (1925)	June 1933		A1	Slieve Bane	August 1954	
20	York Rd	May 1905			December 1929	84	U2	Lisanoure Castle	December 1961	
63	Derby	May 1905	Queen Alexandra		January 1936	87	U2	Queen Alexandra	August 1957	*
64	Derby	May 1905			August 1929		A1	Trostan	August 1954	
65	Derby	May 1905			June 1929		A1	Knockagh	October 1950	
66	Derby	May 1905			May 1930		A1	Ben Madigan	August 1954	
5	York Rd	August 1906		59 (1925)	September 1932	86	U2		March 1960	
17	York Rd	January 1907		58 (1927)	February 1934		A1	Lurigethan	August 1954	‡
67	Derby	June 1908			January 1934	85	U2		March 1960	
68	Derby	June 1908			December 1927		A1	Slieve Gallion	November 1947	

- * The name Queen Alexandra was transferred from No.34 to No.63 in November 1932.
- † Locomotives 34 and 3 were built by the BNCR prior to being taken over by the Midland Railway in 1903.
- ‡ The name Lurigethan was allocated, but never carried.

== Livery ==
The BNCR painted the locomotives "invisible green" (a very dark bronze green that looked almost black) with vermilion, light blue and yellow lining. The initials "BNCR" in block capitals were carried on the tender sides.

The livery remained the same under Midland Railway administration with the addition of the diamond shaped Midland Railway crest to the cab sides and the initials "NCC" in gold block capitals on the tender sides. Buffer beams were vermilion, and the smoke box was black.
