= NER Class C1 =

Class of British steam locomotives

NER Class C1 LNER Class J21
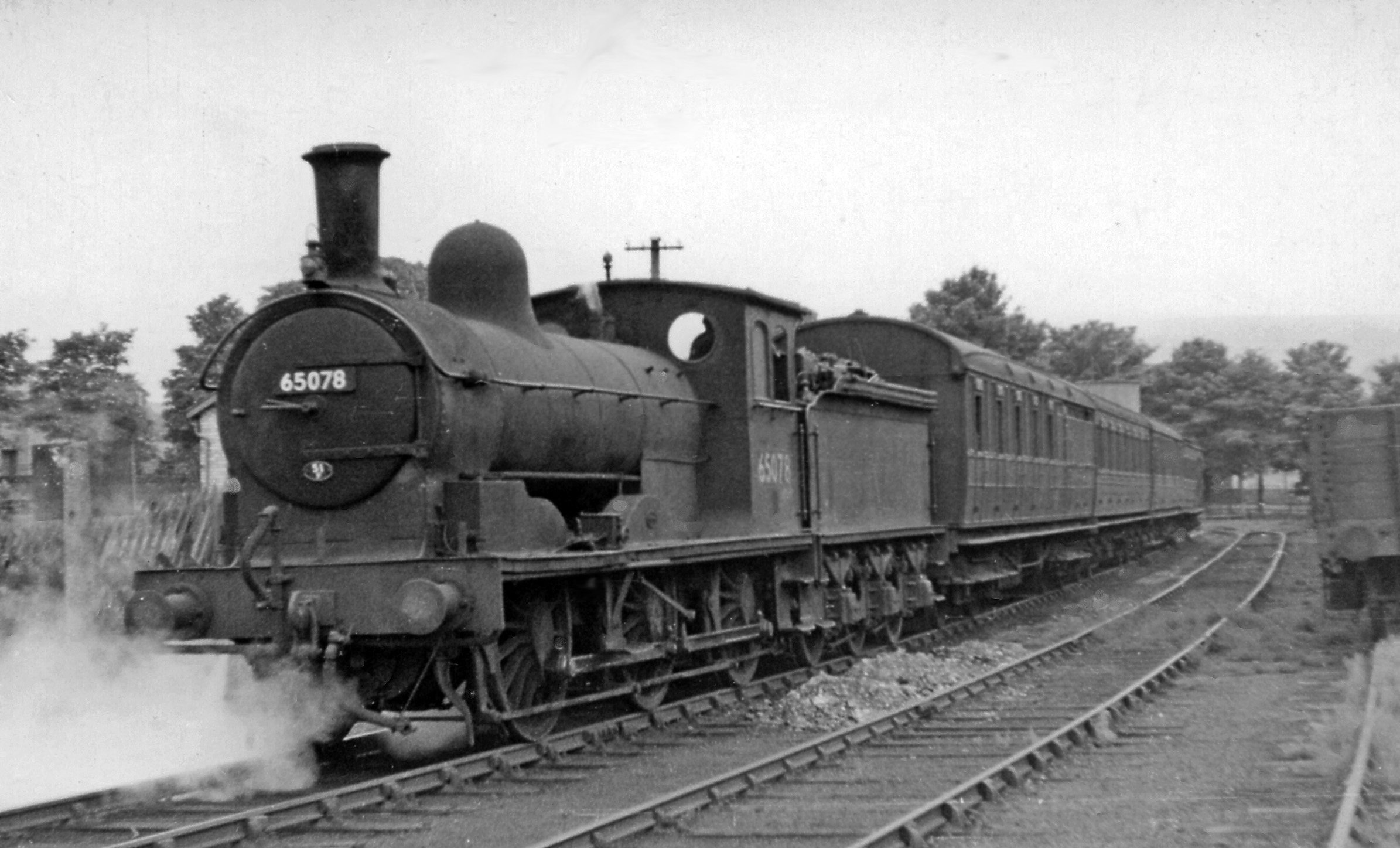
- 65078 at Wearhead Station
Type and origin
- Power type: Steam
- Designer: T. W. Worsdell
- Builder: NER Gateshead and Darlington Works
- Build date: 1886–1894; 1901–1913 (conversions from Class C compounds)
- Total produced: 201
- Rebuild date: 1914-1925 (superheater conversions); 1923-1929 (saturated engines given larger cylinders)
Specifications
- Configuration
  - Whyte: 0-6-0
  - UIC: C
- Gauge: 4 ft 8 1/2 in (1,435 mm) standard gauge
- Driver dia.: 5 ft 1 1/4 in (1.556 m)
- Wheelbase: Loco: 16 ft 6 in (5.03 m); Tender: 12 ft 8 in (3.86 m); Both: 37 ft 9 3/4 in (11.53 m)
- Axle load: 15.5 long tons (15.7 t; 17.4 short tons)
- Loco weight: 42.4 long tons (43.1 t; 47.5 short tons)
- Tender weight: 36.8 long tons (37.4 t; 41.2 short tons)
- Total weight: 79.2 long tons (80.5 t; 88.7 short tons)
- Firebox
  - Grate area: 17.2 sq ft (1.60 m^{2})
- Boiler: 4 ft 3 in (1.30 m) diameter
- Boiler pressure: Original: 140 psi (0.97 MPa); Rebuilt: 160 psi (1.1 MPa)
- Heating surface
  - Firebox: 108 sq ft (10.0 m^{2})
  - Tubes: 1,025 sq ft (95.2 m^{2}) saturated 480 sq ft (45 m^{2}) superheated
  - Flues: 270.1 sq ft (25.09 m^{2}) (superheated only)
  - Total surface: 1,133 sq ft (105.3 m^{2}) saturated 1,041.6 sq ft (96.77 m^{2}) superheated
- Superheater
  - Heating area: 183.5 sq ft (17.05 m^{2})
- Cylinders: Two, inside
- Cylinder size: 18 in × 24 in (460 mm × 610 mm) original 19 in × 24 in (480 mm × 610 mm) rebuilt
- Valve gear: Joy; some rebuilt to Stephenson
- Valve type: slide valves
Performance figures
- Tractive effort: 15,108 lbf (67.20 kN) original 17,265 lbf (76.80 kN) early rebuilds 19,237 lbf (85.57 kN) later rebuilds
Career
- Operators: NER, LNER, BR
- Class: NER: C1, C LNER: J21
- Withdrawn: 1929–1962
- Preserved: 65033
- Restored: 1972
- Disposition: One preserved (no. 876), remainder scrapped

The North Eastern Railway (NER) Class C1, was a class of 0-6-0 freight locomotives designed by T.W. Worsdell. They were used throughout the NER system, although particularly in Teesside between 1886 and 1962.

== History ==
Thirty examples were built at Gateshead between 1886 and 1894, but after 1900 171 examples of the similar Class C compound locomotives were converted to simple operation and added to the class. The whole class was then re-designated as Class C and were numbered between 16 and 1820.

All 201 of the class passed into the London and North Eastern Railway ownership in 1923, and they were classified J21 but without any sub-classes to reflect the different backgrounds or dimensions. The class retained their original North Eastern Railway numbers under the 1924 renumbering scheme. Withdrawal of the class began in 1929, but proceeded relatively slowly and there were still substantial numbers in service in 1943 when the survivors were renumbered between 5025 and 5123' (with gaps). Eighty-two surviving examples passed into British Railways (BR) ownership in 1948, and renumbered by adding 60000 to their exiting numbers. These were gradually withdrawn from service over the next fourteen years.

== Rebuilding ==
The mechanical history of the class is very complex, and both Wilson Worsdell and Vincent Raven made changes to the class. All the Class C compounds were rebuilt as Class C1 simple. Many examples were later rebuilt with a superheater and others had the original Joy valve gear replaced with piston valves and Stephenson valve gear. Some locos were further rebuilt with superheaters, 19 inch bore cylinders, piston valves and Stephenson valve gear. The superheaters were later removed from some of these locomotives.

== Preservation ==
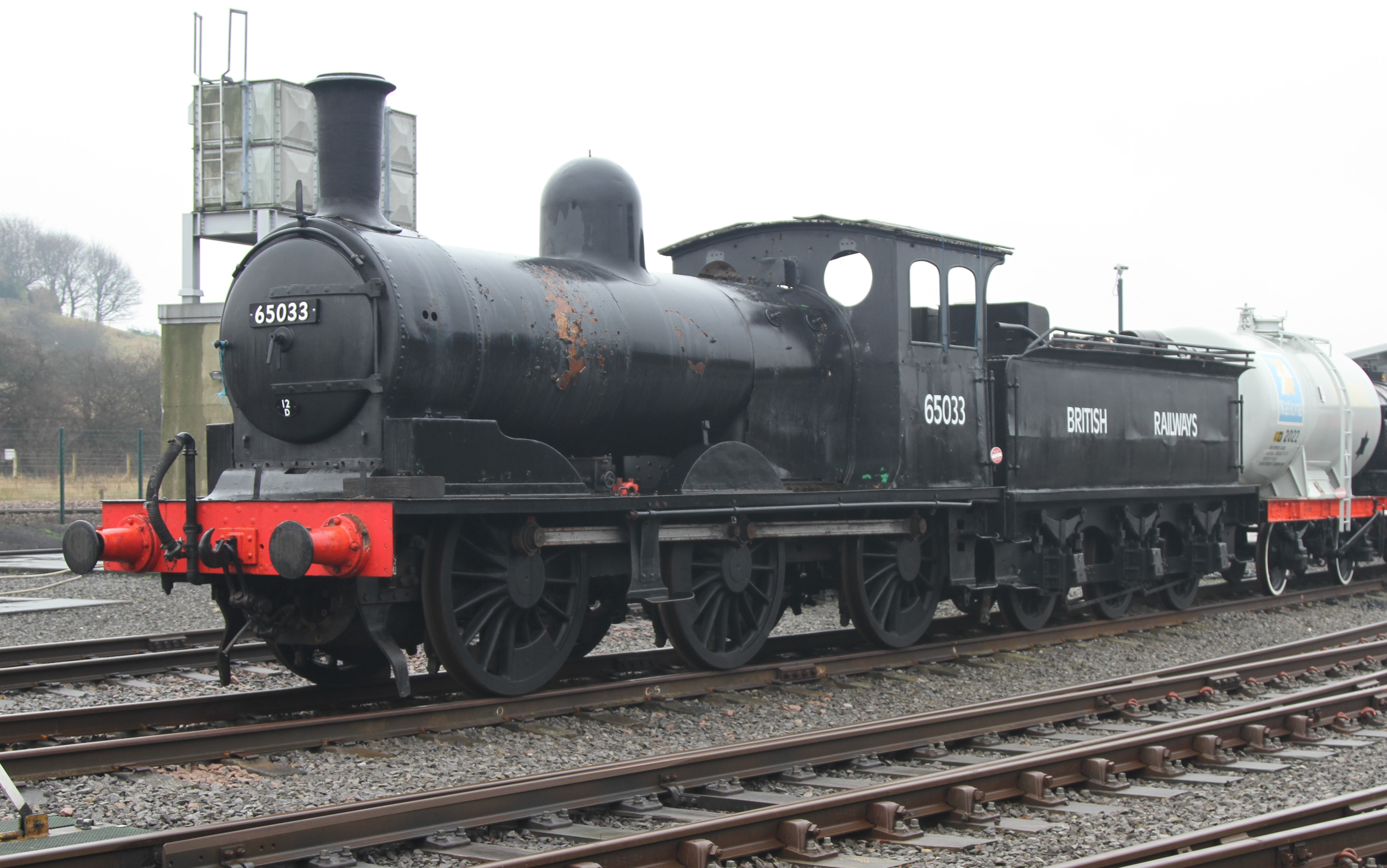
J21 65033 NRM Shildon 08-01-16 (23730032253)

One example, (then numbered 876) was withdrawn in November 1939, but as a result of the onset of war was subsequently repaired and re-instated. It survived as BR 65033 until 1962. The locomotive was then purchased in 1972 for use at the newly established Beamish Museum.

It was used from 1975, pulling the restored NER Coach and the restored NER wagons between the Colliery Sidings and Station, until 1984 when it was declared unfit to run due to the boiler certificate running out. It then languished in the station yard, with No 14 (Hawthorn Leslie) or the Diesel shunter moving it to keep the motion from seizing up on occasion. It was on static display until 2004/2005 when it was removed to the North Norfolk Railway for restoration to steam in 2007.

It is currently at the National Railway Museum Shildon preserved by the Locomotive Conservation & Learning Trust who have owned it since 2011 pending restoration to working order at Kirkby Stephen East station, home of the Stainmore Railway Company. It was announced in July 2017 that the Heritage Lottery Fund bid between the Stainmore Railway Company and the Locomotive Conservation and Learning Trust, to restore both LNER J21 65033 and an ex. North Eastern Railway stores van, no. 5523, as an interpretation vehicle to travel with the locomotive, had been successful. The locomotives overhaul has begun, and after completion it shall move to the Stainmore Railway Company's headquarters.

65099 was a candidate for preservation, but it was scrapped in 1961.
