= NCC Class U2 =

Class of Irish 4-4-0 locomotives

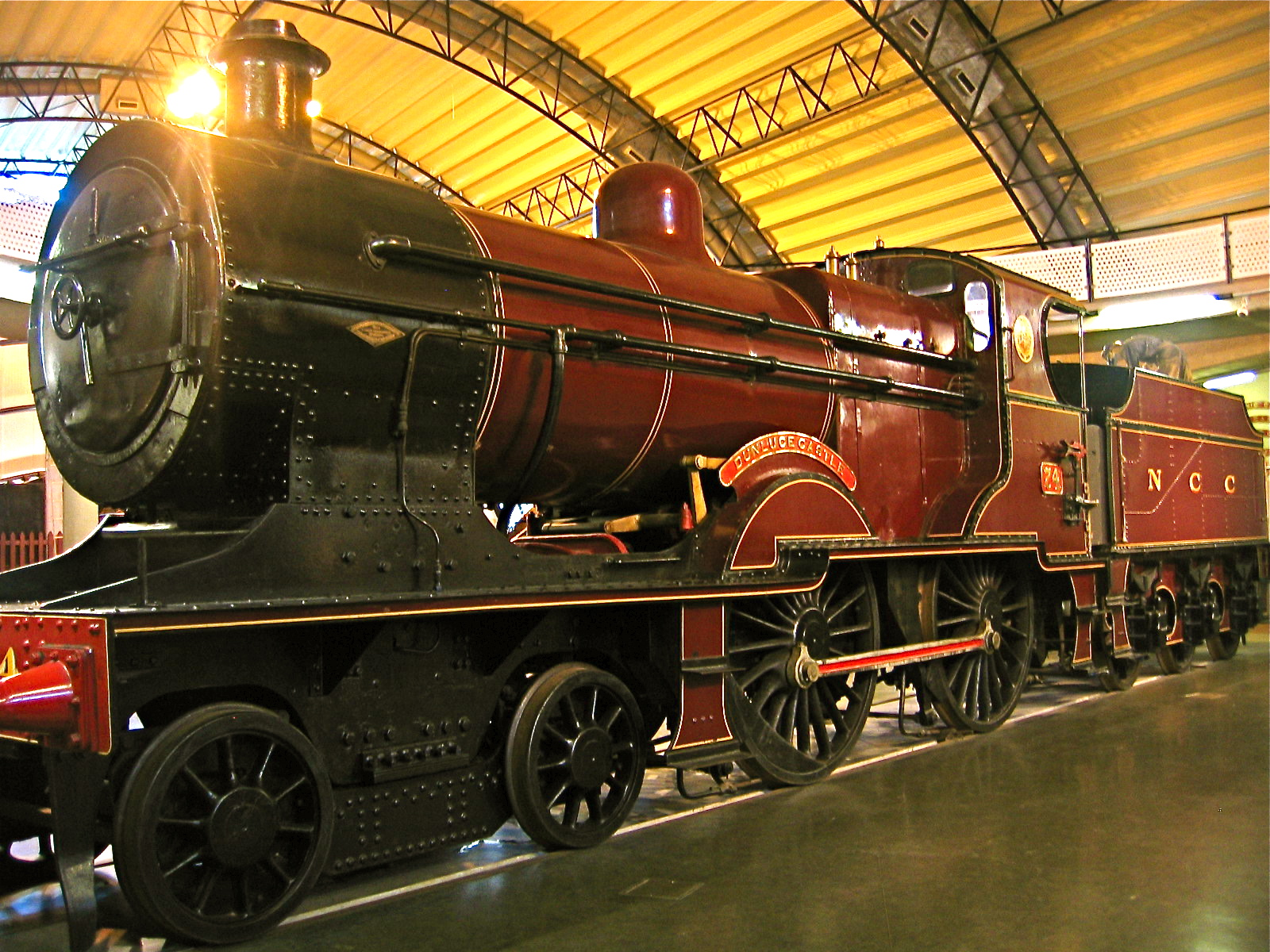
- NCC 74 Dunluce Castle at the Ulster Folk and Transport Museum, Cultra, 2016
Type and origin
- Power type: Steam
- Builder: North British Locomotive Company, Glasgow; NCC, York Road works, Belfast
- Build date: 1924-25 (originals); 1927, 1929, 1934-37 (rebuilt members)
- Total produced: 18
Specifications
- Configuration
  - Whyte: 4-4-0
- Gauge: 5 ft 3 in (1,600 mm)
- Leading dia.: 3 ft 0 in (0.914 m)
- Driver dia.: 6 ft 0 in (1.829 m)
- Wheelbase: No.70: 40 ft 11 in (12.47 m) including tender Nos.71-87: 41 ft 11 in (12.78 m) including tender
- Length: No.70: 49 ft 7 3/4 in (15.13 m); Nos.71-87: 50 ft 7 3/4 in (15.44 m)
- Width: 8 ft 4 in (2.54 m)
- Height: 13 ft 2 in (4.01 m)
- Axle load: 17 long tons 15 cwt (39,800 lb or 18 t)
- Adhesive weight: 35 long tons 9 cwt (79,400 lb or 36 t)
- Loco weight: 51 long tons 10 cwt (115,400 lb or 52.3 t)
- Total weight: Nos.70-73 & 84-87: 85 long tons 12 cwt (191,700 lb or 87 t) (191,700 lb or 87,000 kg); Nos.74-83: 84 long tons 9 cwt (189,200 lb or 85.8 t) (189,200 lb or 85,800 kg)
- Fuel type: Coal
- Fuel capacity: Nos.70-73 & 84-87: 6 long tons (6.1 t); Nos.74-83: 5 long tons (5.1 t)
- Water cap.: Nos.70-73 & 84-87: 2,690 imp gal (12,200 L; 3,230 US gal); Nos.74-83: 2,500 imp gal (11,000 L; 3,000 US gal)
- Boiler pressure: 170 psi (1.17 MPa)
- Heating surface
  - Firebox: 123.5 sq ft (11.47 m^{2})
  - Tubes: 1,045.1 sq ft (97.09 m^{2})
  - Total surface: 1,421.3 sq ft (132.04 m^{2})
- Superheater
  - Type: Schmidt
  - Heating area: 252.7 sq ft (23.48 m^{2})
- Cylinders: Two, inside
- Cylinder size: 19 in × 24 in (483 mm × 610 mm)
- Valve gear: Walschaerts
- Train brakes: Automatic vacuum
Performance figures
- Tractive effort: 17,388 lbf (77.3 kN)
- Factor of adh.: 4.57
Career
- Operators: Northern Counties Committee (LMS); → Ulster Transport Authority
- Number in class: 18
- Numbers: 70–87
- Nicknames: "Scotch Engine"
- Withdrawn: 1956–1961
- Preserved: No.74
- Disposition: One preserved, remainder scrapped

The Northern Counties Committee (NCC) Class U2 4-4-0 passenger steam locomotives consisted of 18 locomotives built for service in Northern Ireland. Ten of the engines were new builds supplied by the North British Locomotive Company (NBL) or constructed at the NCC's York Road works. The remainder were rebuilds of existing locomotives.

== History ==
Class U2 was numerically the largest class of locomotives on the NCC, only being equalled when the last of the Class WT 2-6-4 tank engines was delivered in 1950. The first of the class was built in 1924 and construction continued over the following thirteen years until the last engine was outshopped in 1937.

The Class U2 engines can be divided into four sub classes as follows:

- 7 New engines built by the North British Locomotive Company, Glasgow
- 3 New engines built by the NCC at York Road works, Belfast
- 4 Renewals of Class A engines
- 4 Rebuilds of Class U engines

The renewals were an accounting device to avoid the capital charges associated with building new engines; it is unlikely that much of the original engines was incorporated into the resulting U2s.

The engines were simples, i.e. not compound, with two 19 in × 24 in (483 mm × 610 mm) inside cylinders. Their boilers were rated at 170 pounds per square inch (1.17 MPa) and were fitted with Schmidt superheaters. All eighteen engines, though differing slightly in appearance had, until 1945, the same power output. The only dimensional difference was caused by six boilers, identical with the others, except that the opportunity had been taken for the first time with a Derby boiler to use the broader Irish gauge to full advantage for a wider firebox. The first two of these G7S boilers were fitted to Class A "Heavy Compounds" Nos.67 and 59 when they were renewed as Class U2 in 1934.

Two years later, four more of this type of boiler were ordered when No.87 was constructed out of Class A No.63 and Nos.72 and 73 were rebuilt from Class U to U2. The remaining boiler was presumably to have a been a spare one to enable speed shopping of engines but in the event it was immediately fitted to No.78. This engine was the last of the NBL engines to be built in 1924 but she had run a considerably greater mileage (442,681 miles or 712,430 kilometres) than other members of the class by the time she received the new boiler in October 1936.

No.70 did not have its footplate altered when it was rebuilt from Class U to U2; the short footplate made it unpopular with locomotive crews as the cab became very warm in summer and the position of some of the controls, especially the reversing lever, was cramped. It had the same nominal weight, 51 long tons 10 cwt (115,400 lb or 52.3 t), as the rest of the class,

The new locomotives were supplied with Fowler-type flush-sided tenders with a capacity of 5 tons of coal and 2,500 imperial gallons (11,000 L; 3,000 US gal) of water. The rebuilt locomotives were coupled to the original BNCR-type six-wheeled tenders which could carry 6 tons of coal and 2,690 imperial gallons (12,200 L; 3,230 US gal) of water.

Apart from a slight difference in the cab, the superb external finish of the NBL engines appears to have given them an advantage in prestige among the crews over the three Belfast-built engines. Although less than half of the class had been built in Glasgow, the U2s gained the general nickname of "Scotch Engines".

Eleven of the engines were named after Ulster castles and a twelfth, No.87, carried the name Queen Alexandra.

The U2s provided the top-link workings on the NCC until the arrival of the Class W Moguls in 1933, from then on they were usually worked on commuter workings and the Derry Central line. The fastest timing for the Portrush expresses that the U2s worked in 1932 was 82 minutes for the 58.3 miles (93.8 km) from Greenisland to Portrush, over half of the route being over a single line. They also worked the Larne Harbour boat trains, being allowed 30 minutes for the 24⅓ miles, again over a route with a significant proportion of single track.

While most of the class were based at Belfast, Nos.70, 73 and 80 were at one time assigned to Larne shed and Nos.74 and 81 were at Coleraine. In later years, No.77 was also based at Coleraine and would be one of the last engines to work a train over the Derry Central line before it closed.

The U2s performed sterling service during the busiest years of World War II. A typical job was to take over a military train at Antrim that had been worked through from the GNR(I). Having hauled eight bogie coaches from Antrim to the summit of the NCC main line, a stop would be made at Ballyclare Junction to attach carriages that had arrived from Derry or Cookstown on a previous train before travelling on to Larne Harbour where it was common to see trains of twelve or more bogie coaches arriving.

In 1945–1946, Nos.71 and 81 had the diameters of their cylinders reduced from 19–18 in (483–457 mm). It is possible that the cylinders fitted to No.72 came from Class U1 engine No.3 which had just been withdrawn. Originally fitted with Fowler pattern chimneys that had capuchons, some the class, such as No.76, later received a Stanier type and it was said by their crews that they never steamed as well after this alteration.

The Ulster Transport Authority (UTA) arranged a massive sale of withdrawn locomotives in January 1956 which included the first U2s to be withdrawn. These were Nos.70, 79, 82 and 83 at Carrickfergus and Nos.71 and 77 brought up from Ballymena. The remainder of the class were withdrawn over the following seven years. The last to go in June 1962 was No.74 Dunluce Castle which was destined for preservation.

=== Building and withdrawal data ===
The following table summarises the building and rebuilding history of the Class U2 locomotives:

U2 No.	Builder	Date built	Name	Orig. Class	Orig. No.	Re-No./ Date	Rebuilt as U2	Date rebuilt	Withdrawn	Notes
70	MR, Derby	Jul 1914		U	70		NCC, York Rd	Nov 1924	Jan 1956	
71	MR, Derby	Jul 1914	Glenarm Castle	U	69	71 / 1923	NCC, York Rd	Mar 1927	Jan 1956	
72	MR, Derby	Dec 1922		U	14	72 / 1923	NCC, York Rd	Feb 1937	Dec 1961	
73	MR, Derby	Dec 1922		U	15	73 / 1923	NCC, York Rd	Dec 1937	Jun 1956	
74	NBL, Glasgow	Jul 1924	Dunluce Castle						Jun 1962†	Preserved
75	NBL, Glasgow	Jul 1924	Antrim Castle						Jun 1956	
76	NBL, Glasgow	Jul 1924	Olderfleet Castle						Sep 1959	
77	NBL, Glasgow	Jul 1924							Jan 1956	
78	NBL, Glasgow	Jul 1924	Chichester Castle						Mar 1960	
79	NCC, York Rd	Aug 1925	Kenbaan Castle						Jan 1956	
80	NCC, York Rd	Nov 1925	Dunseverick Castle						Dec 1961	
81	NCC, York Rd	Dec 1925	Carrickfergus Castle						Aug 1957	
82	NBL, Glasgow	May 1925	Dunananie Castle						Jan 1956	
83	NBL, Glasgow	May 1925	Carra Castle						Jan 1956	
84	NCC, York Rd	May 1905	Lissanoure Castle	A	20	as renewed	NCC, York Rd	Dec 1929	Dec 1961	
85	MR, Derby	Jun 1908		A	67	as renewed	NCC, York Rd	May 1934	Mar 1960	
86	NCC, York Rd	Aug 1906		A	59	as renewed	NCC, York Rd	Sep 1934	Mar 1960	
87	MR, Derby	May 1905	Queen Alexandra*	A	63	as renewed	NCC, York Rd	May 1936	Aug 1957	

- The name Queen Alexandra was transferred from Class A No.34 to No.63 in November 1932.
† Preserved.

=== An Irish 2P? ===
The NCC's Class U2 locomotives showed a strong Midland Railway influence in their design and bore a superficial resemblance to the LMS Class 2P 4-4-0 locomotives. However, one should not regard the U2s as an Irish equivalent of the LMS 2P; they were quite different engines. That the two classes had little in common is shown by a comparison of principal dimensions:

	NCC U2	LMS 2P
Driver size:	6 ft 0 in (1.83 m)	6 ft 9 in (2.06 m)
Locomotive weight:	51 ton 10 cwt	54 ton 1 cwt
Boiler pressure:	170 psi (1.17 MPa)	180 psi (1.24 MPa)
Cylinders:	19 in × 24 in (483 mm × 610 mm)	19 in × 26 in (483 mm × 660 mm)
Valve gear:	Walschaerts	Stephenson link
Tractive effort:	17,338 lbf (77.1 kN)	17,730 lbf (78.9 kN)

== Livery ==
=== LMS NCC ===
The Class U2 locomotives were painted in crimson lake (RAL 3002) with yellow and black lining. The LMS crest was carried on the upper cab sides. The initials "NCC" in shaded serif gold capital letters were placed centrally on the tender sides. Number plates were brass with raised digits and edge; they were carried on the lower cab sides with another placed centrally on the back of the tender tank. The named engines carried curved nameplates fitted above the leading driving wheel splashers. Buffer beams and number plate and name plate backgrounds were painted red. The engine number was applied to the front buffer beam in shaded gold digits.

During World War II, the engines were painted black. Red buffer beams and number plate and name plate backgrounds proved additional relief from the somber effect. However, No.81 received a coat of maroon paint in 1941 when it was overhauled at the Great Northern Railway of Ireland works at Dundalk in County Louth.

Post war livery continued to be black but enlivened by vermilion lining.

=== UTA ===
Following transfer of ownership to the UTA, locomotive No.80 Dunseverick Castle was turned out in an experimental olive green livery in late 1948.

However, the livery that the UTA finally adopted saw the engines painted black with vermilion and yellow lining. Buffer beams, name and number plate backgrounds were red and the practice of putting the number on the front buffer beam was continued.

The UTA roundel, 14-inch (356 mm) in diameter, with "Ulster Transport" in orange block capitals, lined in red, surrounding a white shield bearing the Red Hand of Ulster, all on a mid-green background, was placed in the middle of the tender sides.

== Preservation ==
No.74 Dunluce Castle was restored into its original LMS (NCC) livery at the UTA's Duncrue Street workshops during late 1962 and in April 1963 was transferred to the Belfast Transport Museum. This locomotive is the only preserved NCC tender engine and can now be seen in the Ulster Folk and Transport Museum, Cultra, Holywood, County Down. BT18 0EU.
