= NER Class C =

Type and origin
- Power type: Steam
- Designer: T.W. Worsdell
- Builder: NER Gateshead and Darlington
- Build date: 1886-1894
- Total produced: 171
- Rebuild date: 1901-1913 (Class C compounds converted to Class C1)
Specifications
- Configuration
  - Whyte: 0-6-0
- Gauge: 4 ft 8 1/2 in (1,435 mm)
- Driver dia.: 5 ft 1 1/4 in (1.556 m)
- Boiler pressure: 160 psi (1.1 MPa)
- Cylinders: 2 (compound)
- High-pressure cylinder: 18 in × 24 in (460 mm × 610 mm)
- Low-pressure cylinder: 26 in × 24 in (660 mm × 610 mm)
- Valve gear: Joy (slide valves)
Performance figures
- Tractive effort: 16,952 lbf (75.41 kN)
Career
- Operators: NER
- Class: C
- Number in class: 171
- Retired: 1901-1913
- Disposition: no Class Cs preserved, 1 Class C1 preserved.

The NER Class C was a class of 171 two-cylinder compound steam locomotives of the 0-6-0 wheel arrangement built between 1886 and 1894 for the North Eastern Railway. These engines were designed to fill NER's need for goods engines; however, issues with reliability and fuel consumption led to all 171 being rebuilt as simple expansion engines Class C1 type between 1901 and 1913.
