= Worsdell =

Worsdell is a surname. Notable people with the surname include:

- Nathaniel Worsdell, English locomotive engineer
- Thomas Clarke Worsdell, English locomotive engineer
- Thomas William Worsdell (1838–1916), English locomotive engineer
- Wilson Worsdell, English locomotive engineer
