= Whip It =

Whip It or Whippit may refer to:

- "Whip It" (BigXthaPlug song)
- "Whip It" (Devo song)
- "Whip It" (Nicki Minaj song)
- "Whip It!" (song), a song by LunchMoney Lewis featuring Chloe Angelides
- Whip It (film), a 2009 film
- Whippits, whipped-cream chargers used as a source of recreational nitrous oxide
- Whippit, a recurring location in the Carry On series of films
- Whippit, a sawed-off shotgun created by bank robber Clyde Barrow

== See also ==
- Whippet (disambiguation)
