= BNCR Class S =

Class of two-cylinder compound locomotives

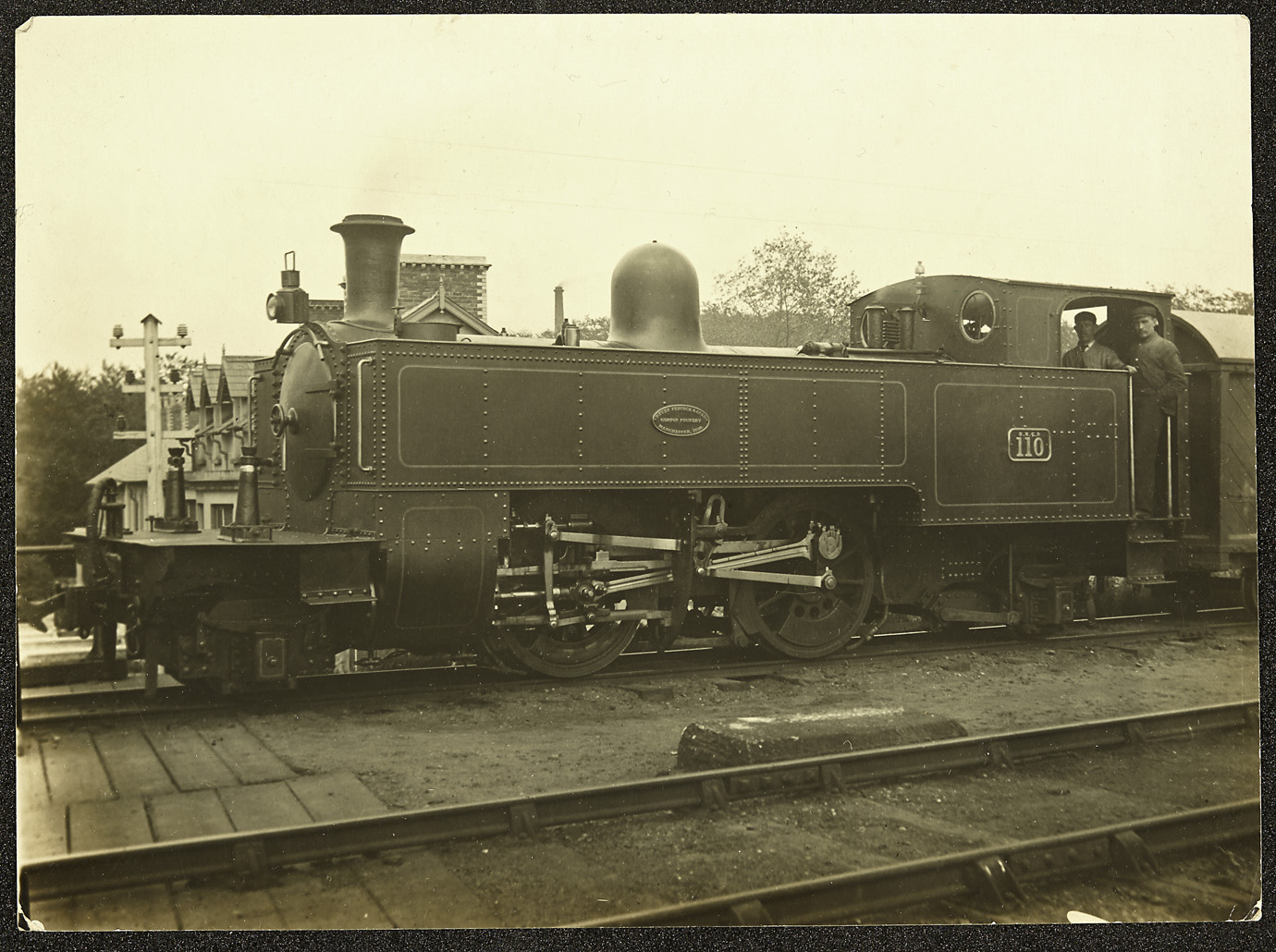
- Nº 110
Type and origin
- Power type: Steam
- Designer: S. Rendall
- Builder: Beyer, Peacock & Company, Manchester & MR (NCC), York Road works, Belfast
- Build date: 1892–1920
- Total produced: 6
Specifications
- Configuration
  - Whyte: 2-4-2T
- Gauge: 3 ft (914 mm)
- Leading dia.: 2 ft 0 in (610 mm)
- Driver dia.: 3 ft 9 in (1,143 mm)
- Trailing dia.: 2 ft 0 in (610 mm)
- Wheelbase: 20 ft 3 in (6.17 m)
- Length: 27 ft 9 7/8 in (8.48 m)
- Width: 7 ft 4 in (2.24 m)
- Height: 9 ft 8 in (2.95 m)
- Adhesive weight: 10 long tons (10.2 t; 11.2 short tons) + 10 long tons (10.2 t; 11.2 short tons)
- Loco weight: 31.85 long tons (32.36 t; 35.67 short tons)
- Fuel type: Coal
- Fuel capacity: 1 long ton (1.0 t; 1.1 short tons)
- Water cap.: 570 imperial gallons (2,600 L; 680 US gal)
- Boiler pressure: 160 psi (1.1 MPa)
- Heating surface
  - Firebox: 58.2 sq ft (5.41 m^{2})
  - Tubes: 614.8 sq ft (57.12 m^{2})
  - Total surface: 673 sq ft (62.5 m^{2})
- Cylinders: Two
- High-pressure cylinder: LHS: 14 3/4 in × 20 in (375 mm × 508 mm)
- Low-pressure cylinder: RHS: 21 in × 20 in (533 mm × 508 mm)
- Valve gear: Walschaerts
- Loco brake: Steam
- Train brakes: Automatic vacuum
Performance figures
- Tractive effort: 13,150 lbf (58.49 kN)
Career
- Operators: BNCR; NCC; UTA
- Scrapped: 1938–55

The Belfast and Northern Counties Railway (BNCR) Class S was a class of 2-4-2T two-cylinder compound steam locomotives that was introduced for service on the 3 ft (914 mm) narrow gauge railways of County Antrim in north-east Ireland.

== History ==
The Class S was a class of six locomotives designed under the supervision of Bowman Malcolm as a narrow gauge application of the Worsdell-von Borries system of two-cylinder compound locomotives that had been adopted by the Northern Counties Committee (BNCR). Limited space between the frames required them to have outside cylinders and Walschaerts valve gear unlike their 5 ft 3 in (1,600 mm) broad gauge counterparts. The smaller diameter high-pressure cylinder was on the left and the larger low-pressure one on the right.

Two engines were ordered from Beyer, Peacock & Company in January 1892 and left Manchester in May 1892 entering service as numbers 69 and 70. They were renumbered 110 and 111 respectively in 1897. The class would only be enlarged after the BNCR had amalgamated with the Midland Railway to become the Northern Counties Committee (NCC).

The next engines were built by the NCC at York Road works to transport valuable iron ore traffic, that had been obtained in 1907, from the mines at Parkmore to Larne Harbour via Ballymena. Two engines entered service as No.112 in October 1908 and No.113 in March 1909. They were renumbered 102 and 101 respectively in 1920.

The last two members of the class were Nos.103 and 104. Outshopped from York Road in September 1919 and March 1920 respectively, they were the last von Borries compounds to be built.

Built for service on the Ballymena & Larne and Cushendall lines of the BNCR, various members of the class were transferred to the Ballycastle Railway following that line's amalgamation with the NCC in 1924.

Nos.101 and 102 were rebuilt in 1930 and 1928 respectively with a coal bunker at the rear to reduce the need to store coal inside the cab and had the trailing radial truck extended accordingly; these were reclassified as Class S1. No.110 was heavily rebuilt in 1931 as a 2-4-4T with a standard gauge boiler and reclassified as Class S2.

Of the three unaltered Class S, 103 had the shortest existence and at the end of 1938 it was scrapped after being out of use for two years.

111 (ex-70) was renumbered a second time in December 1948, becoming No.44. Having spent her latter years on the Ballycastle line it accumulated a total of more than one million miles (1,600,000 km) before being withdrawn after 58 years of service. No.44 was scrapped in February 1954.

104 was shedded at Ballymena for many years and was renumbered No.43 in October 1943. Four years later it received a heavy repair and was transferred to the Ballycastle line where it worked until the line closed in 1950. No.43 remained in stock until 1954 when it was scrapped.

== Technical details ==
When starting a locomotive from rest, a simpling valve was opened which admitted steam directly from the boiler to the low-pressure cylinder as well as the high-pressure one. Not only did this provide maximum tractive effort when starting but also avoided problems that might arise if the high-pressure piston was in a dead centre position. Once moving, the simpling valve was closed and the locomotive continued in compound operation.

== Livery ==
=== BNCR ===
Under the BNCR, the colour of the engines is believed to have been a dark laurel green lined out in vermilion/light blue/chrome yellow as follows:

Panel:	laurel green
1/8 in line:	vermilion	rounded corners
1 in band:	laurel green	rounded corners
3/8 in line:	light blue	rounded corners
3/8 in line:	chrome yellow	rounded corners

=== MR (NCC) ===
When the Midland Railway took control, the engines were painted "invisible green" (a very dark bronze green that looked almost black). Lining appears to have been the same as in BNCR days, i.e. vermilion/light blue/chrome yellow. The initials "MR" in shaded, sans-serif gold capitals were on the side tanks ahead the number plate and the Midland crest- which was the earlier diamond shaped device – was on the cab side. Buffer beams were vermilion, and the smoke box was black. The brass number plates had an invisible green background.

=== LMS (NCC) ===
During LMS ownership, the locomotives were painted in LMS crimson lake or maroon. The smokebox was black and the buffer beam was red. The LMS (NCC) crest was carried on the cab side-sheet. The initials "NCC" were sited on the side tanks, in shaded serif gold capitals, placed in front of the number plates. The number plate backgrounds were at first maroon, but were later painted red. The lining was as follows:

Panel:	crimson lake or maroon
1/8 in line:	yellow ochre	square corners
2 1/2–3 in band:	black	square corners
Edge

During World War II, all the narrow-gauge engines were painted unlined black. Only the red buffer beams and number plate backgrounds relieved the somber effect.

=== UTA ===
Under the Ulster Transport Authority, the narrow-gauge engines, for which there was no long-term future, continued in the unrelieved black wartime colour scheme. This was eventually enlivened on Nos.43 and 44 by vermilion and yellow lining:

Panel:	black
1/8 in line:	vermilion	square corners
1 in band:	black	square corners
1/4 in line:	yellow	square corners

The UTA roundel, 14in in diameter, with "Ulster Transport" in orange block capitals, lined in red, surrounding a white shield bearing the red hand of Ulster, all on a mid-green background, was placed in the middle of the side tanks of Nos. 43 and 44.

=== Number plates ===
The number plates were cast in brass, in a horizontal rectangular format with radiused corners. The size was about 18in x 10in and a raised ½in edge surrounded the plate. The plates were mounted on the tank sides level with the front of the cab. The plates of the first BNCR number series (Nos. 69 and 70) which was current to 1897 contained polished, raised, numbers with prominent serifs. The BNCR 1897 renumbering introduced a series of plates which had "BNCR" in small block capitals above the digits. The BNCR style of plates was used throughout both MR and LMS days. The MR (NCC) renumbering of 12/102 and 113/101, and numbering of 103 and 104, gave these engines plates with digits alone, but otherwise they were similar to the earlier series, and this principle was maintained in the last renumbering to Nos.43 and 44.
