= Builder's plate =

Metal identification plate

A builder's plate is a metal plate that is attached to railway locomotives and rolling stock, bogies, construction equipment, trucks, automobiles, large household appliances, bridges, ships and more. It gives such information as the name of the manufacturer, the place and country of manufacture, the model number, the serial number, as well as the date of manufacture or date of fabrication of the item or unit.

== Galleries ==
=== Locomotives ===
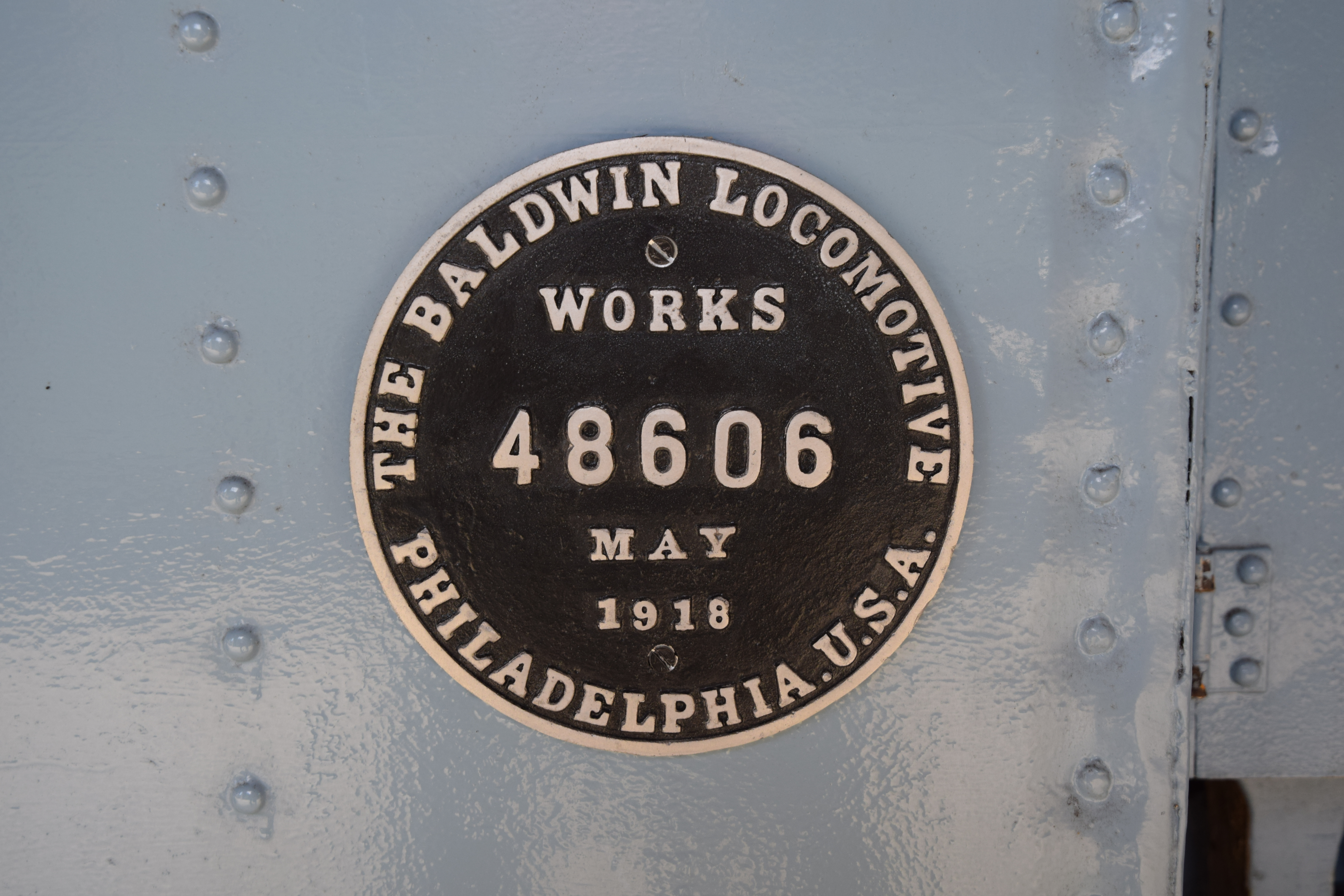
Baldwin Locomotive Works

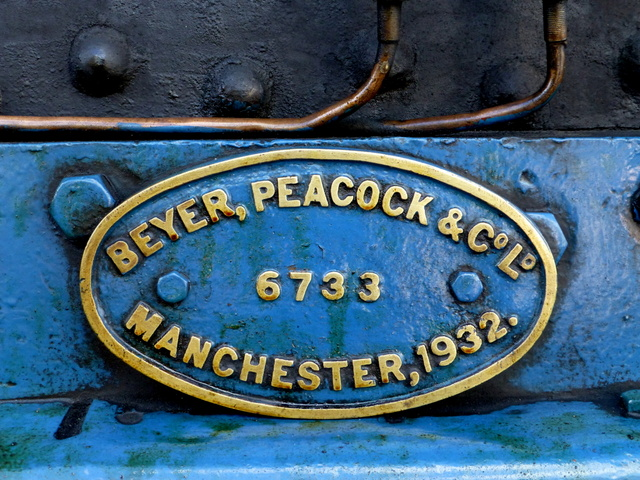
Beyer, Peacock & Company

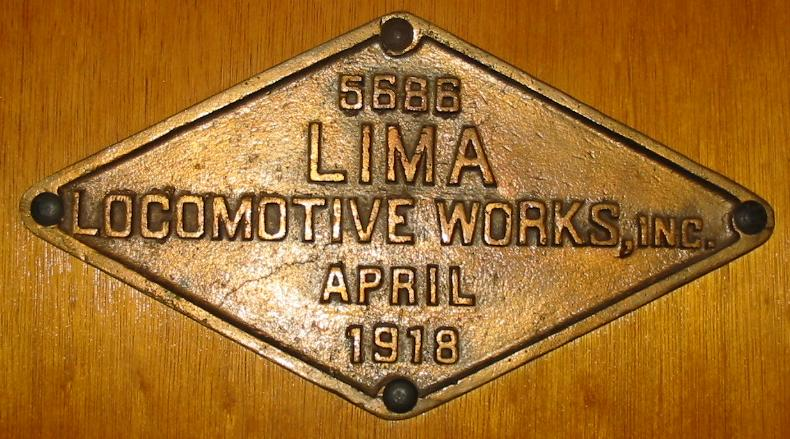
Lima Locomotive Works

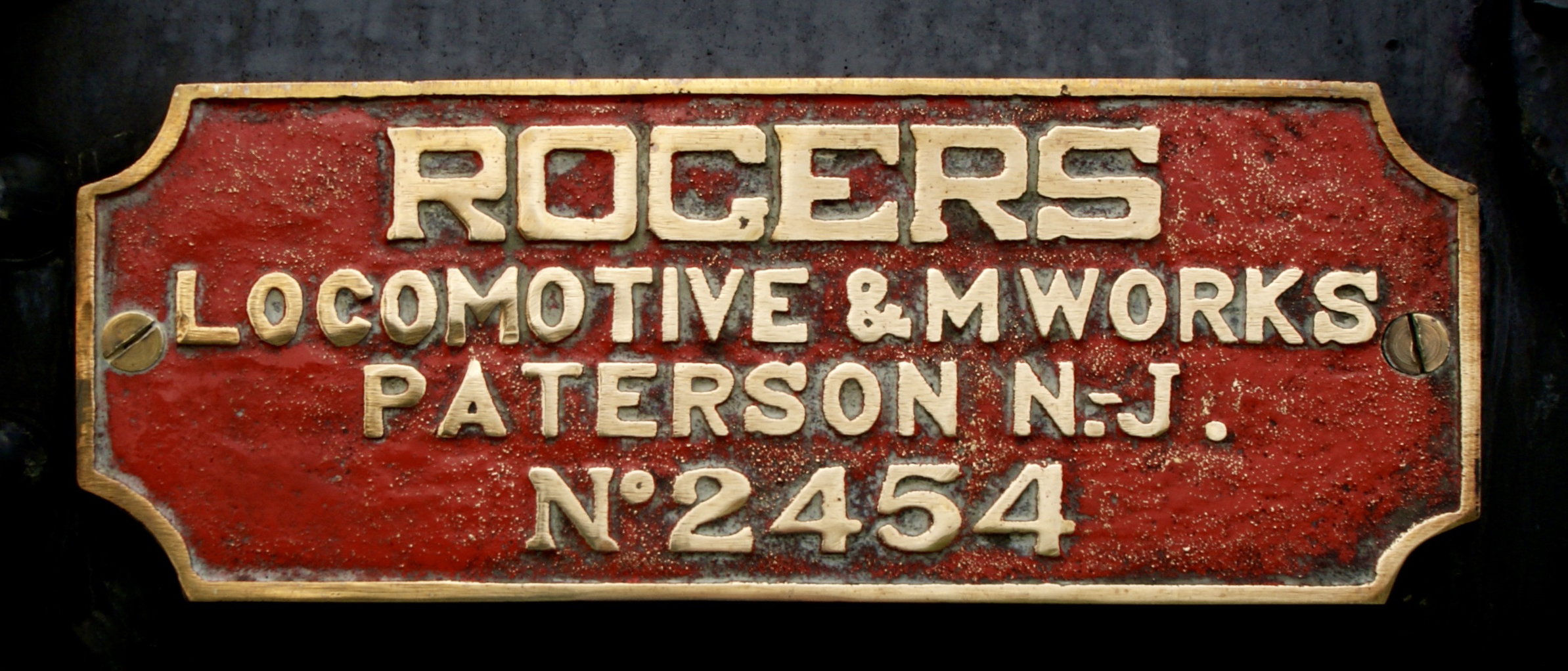
Rogers Locomotive Works

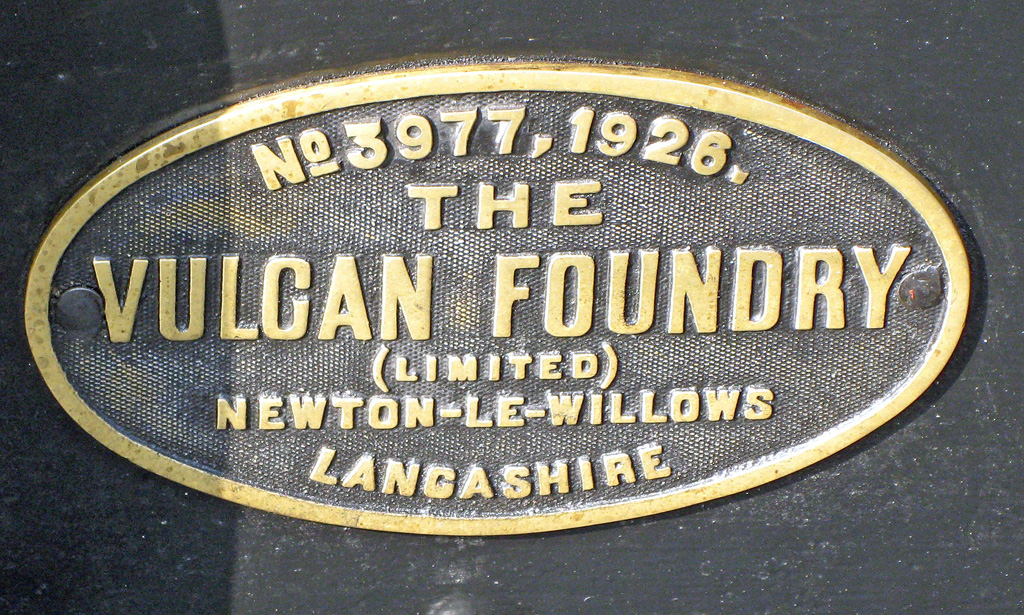
Vulcan Foundry

=== Multiple units ===
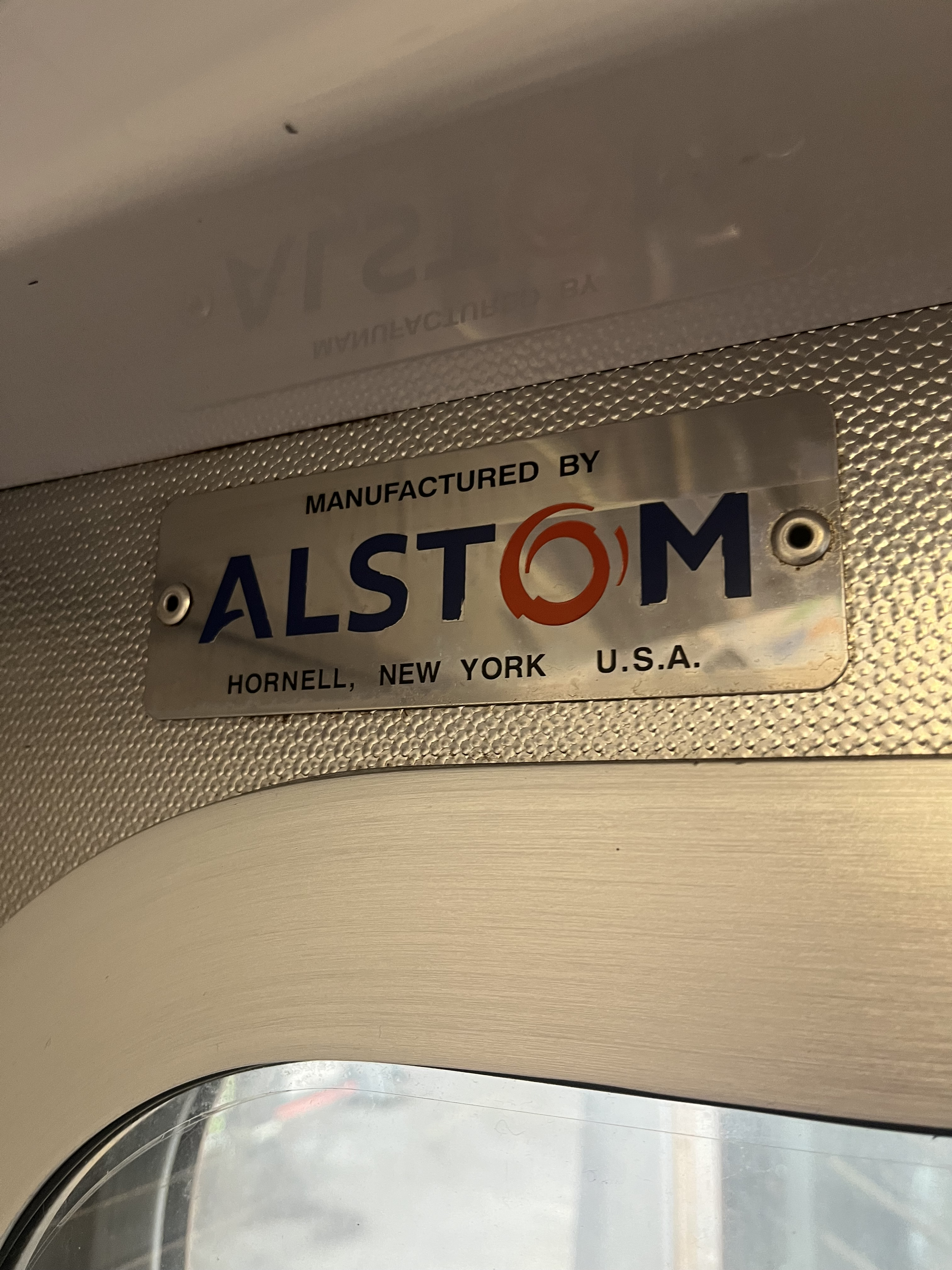
Alstom

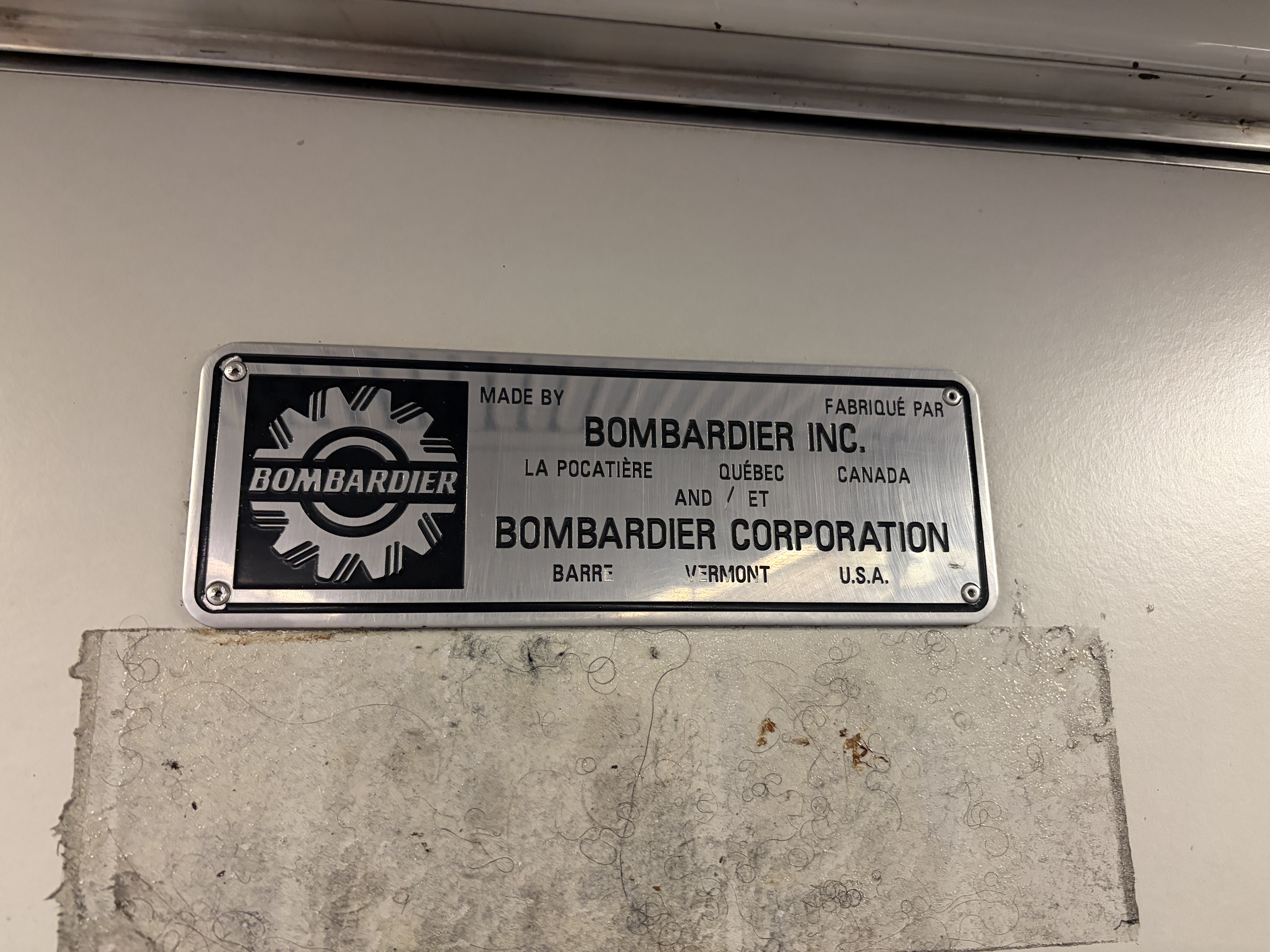
Bombardier

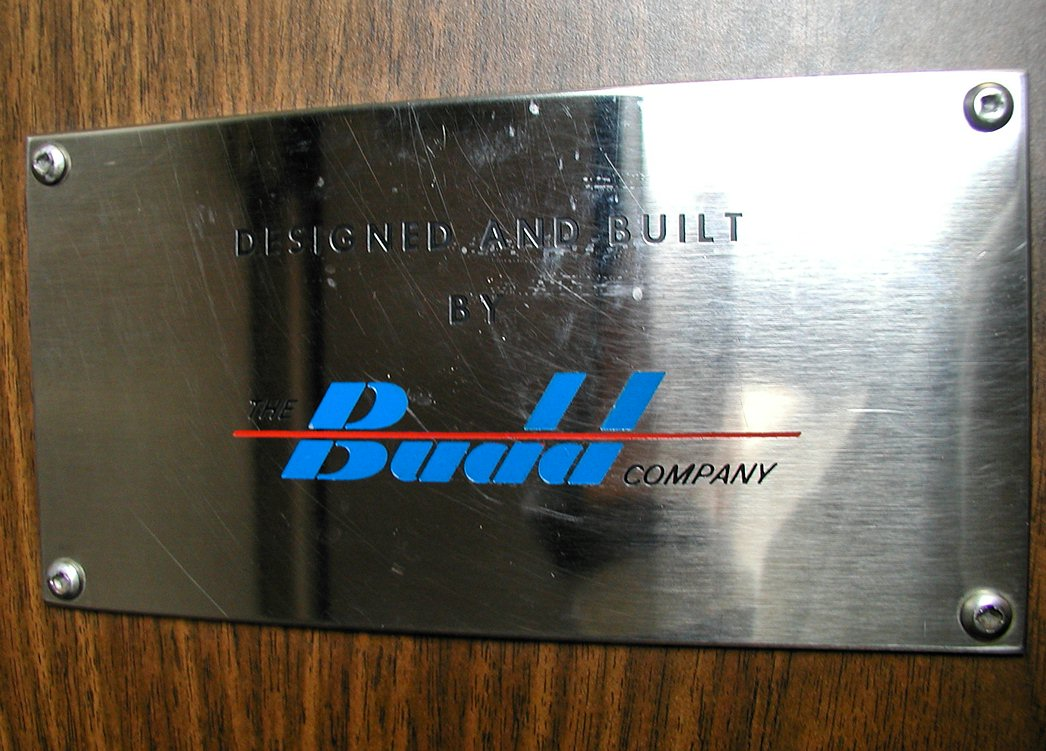
Budd

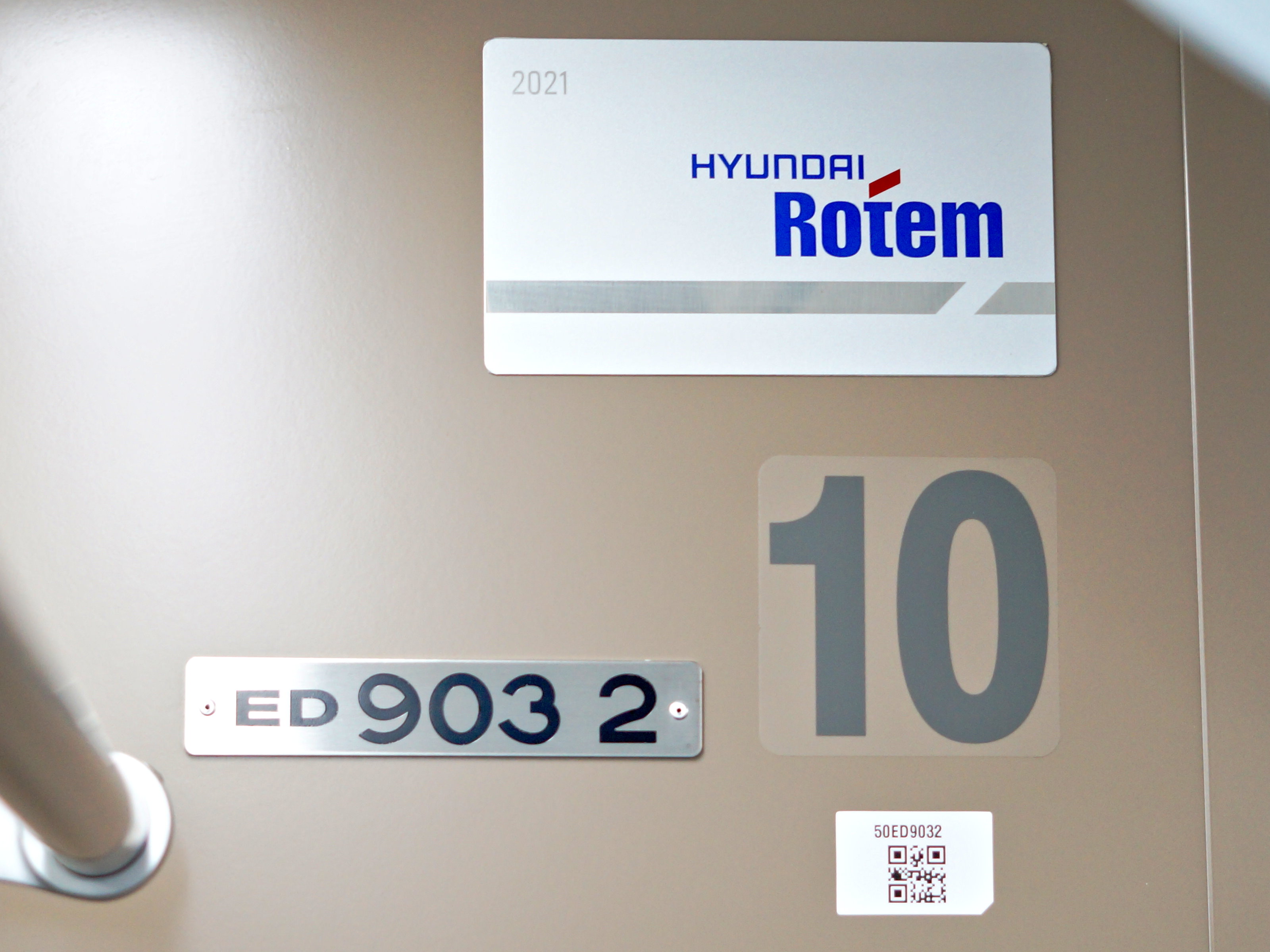
Hyundai Rotem

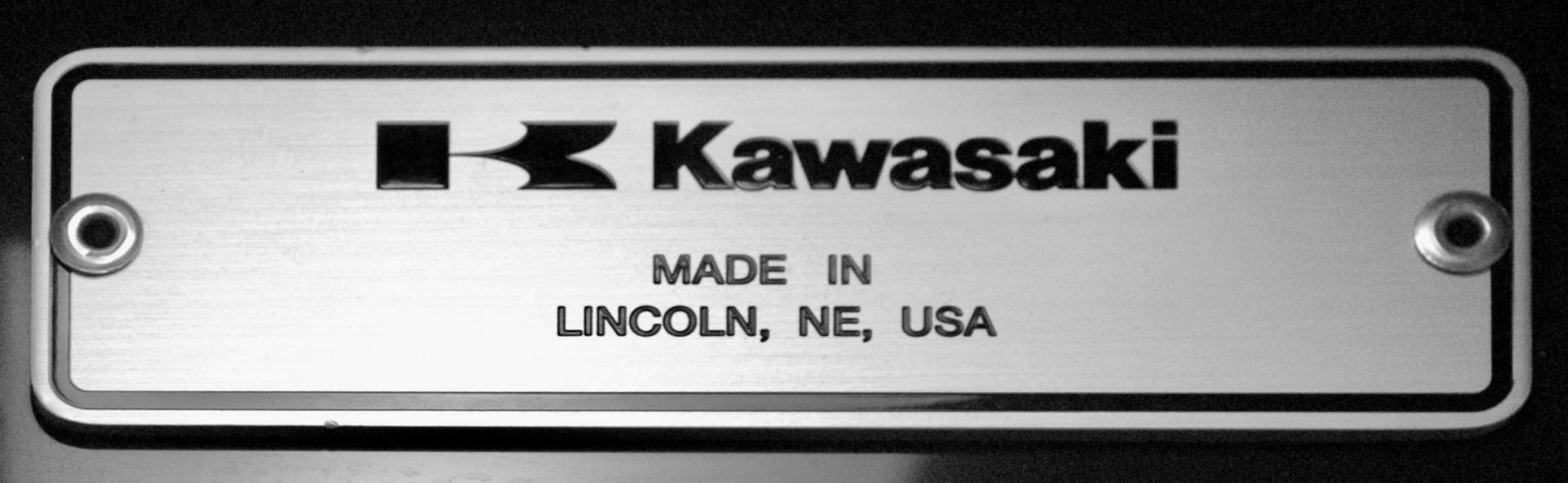
Kawasaki

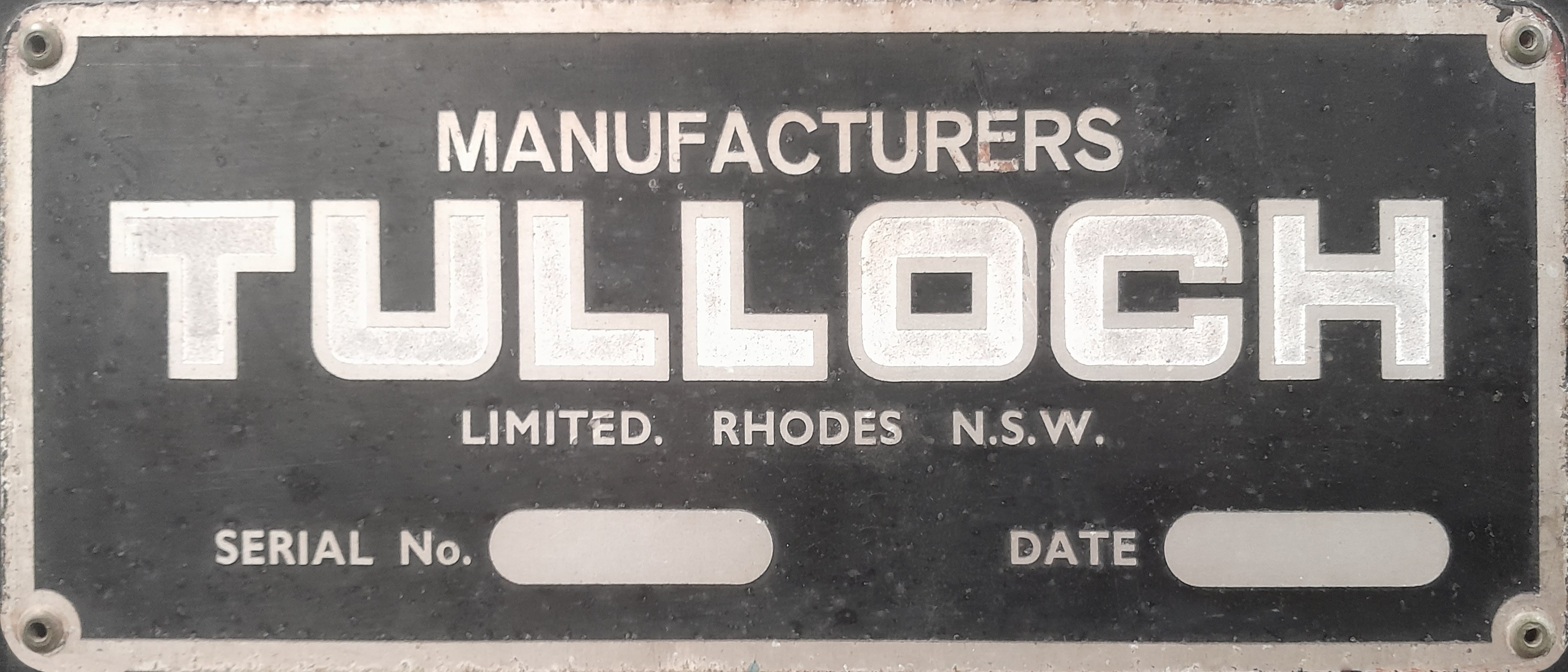
Tulloch Limited

=== Ships ===
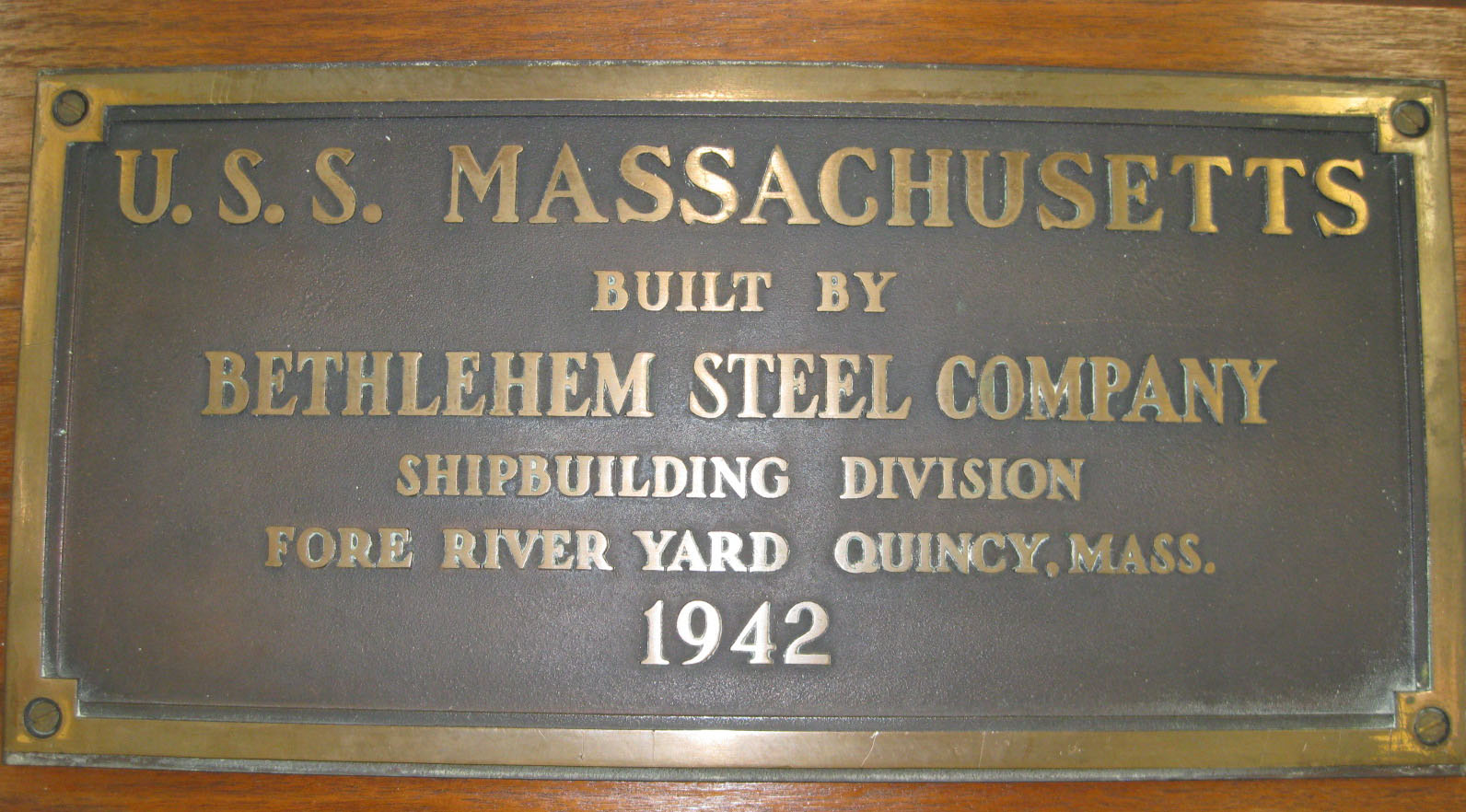
Bethlehem Steel

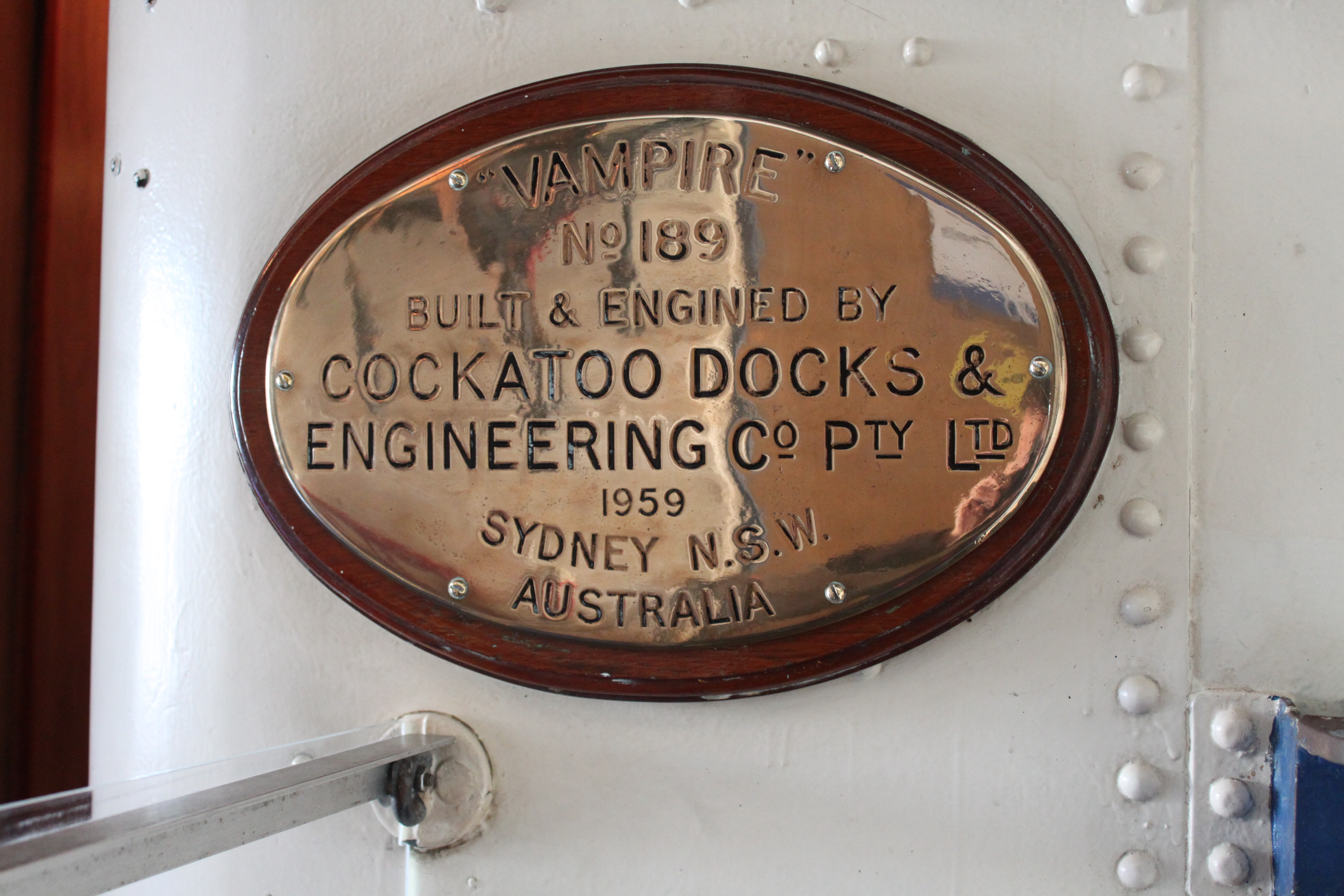
Cockatoo Docks & Engineering Company

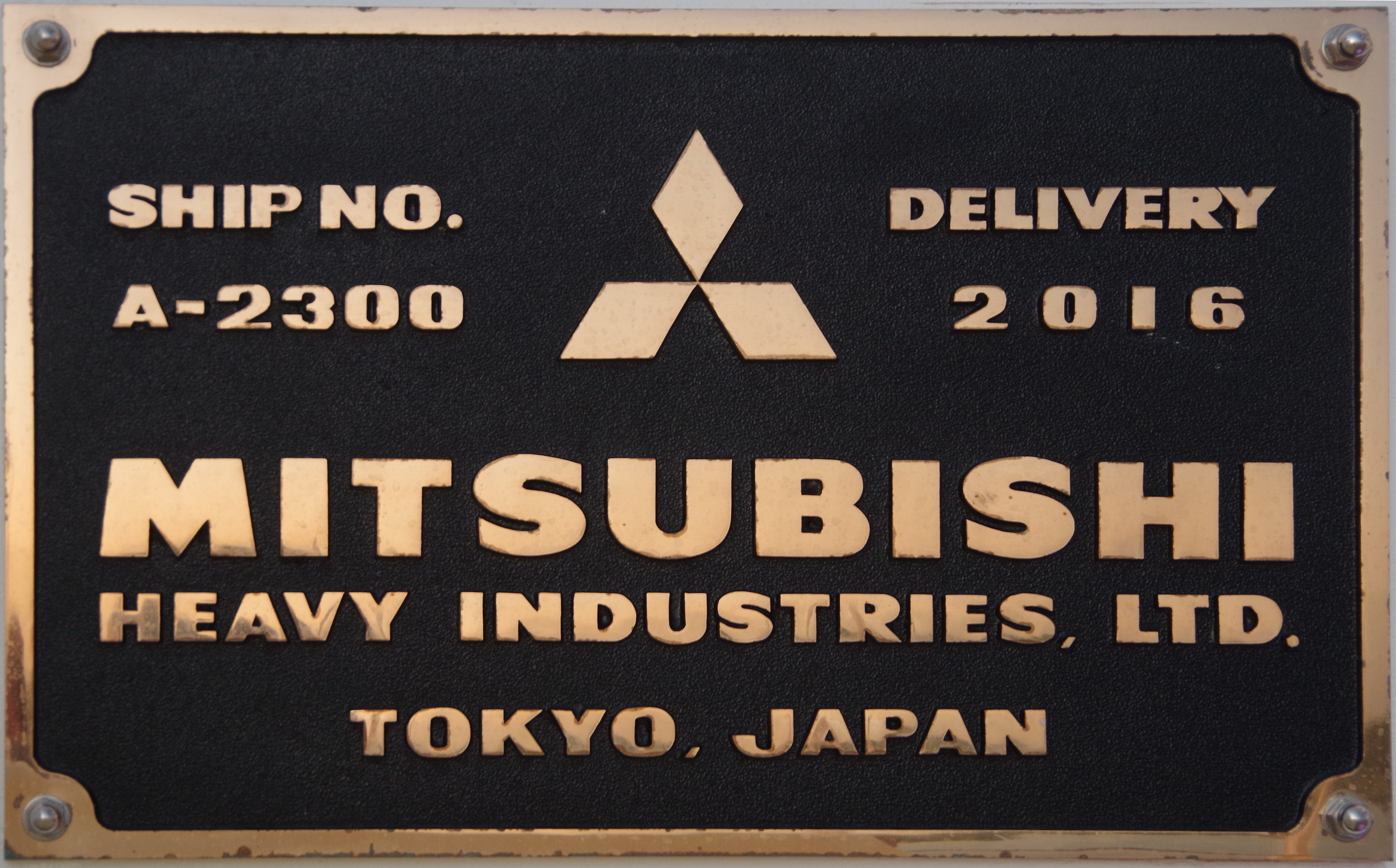
Mitsubishi Heavy Industries

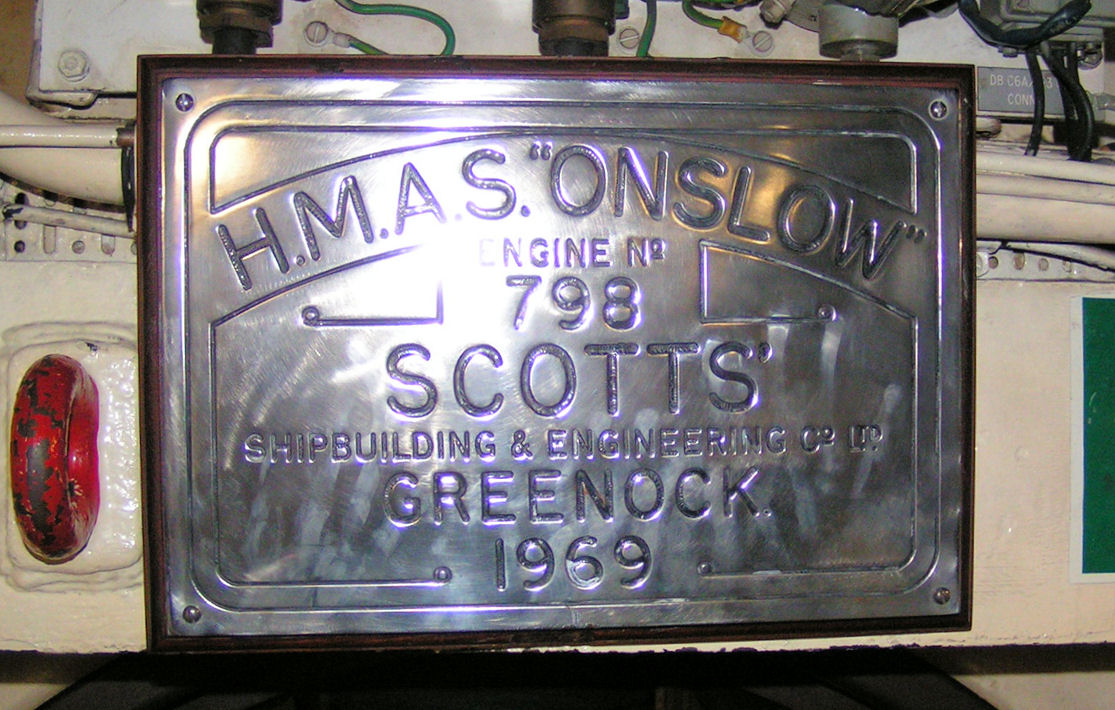
Scotts Shipbuilding & Engineering Company

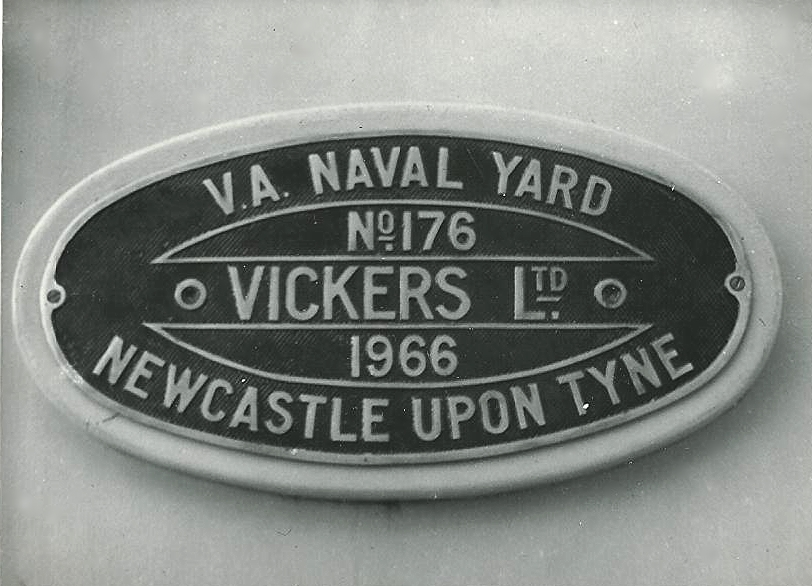
Vickers Limited

== See also ==
- Engine number
- Head badge
- Headboard (train)
- Nameplate
- Railroadiana
- Vehicle Identification Number
- Vehicle registration plate
