= GER Class N31 =

Class of British steam locomotives

GER Class N31 LNER Class J14
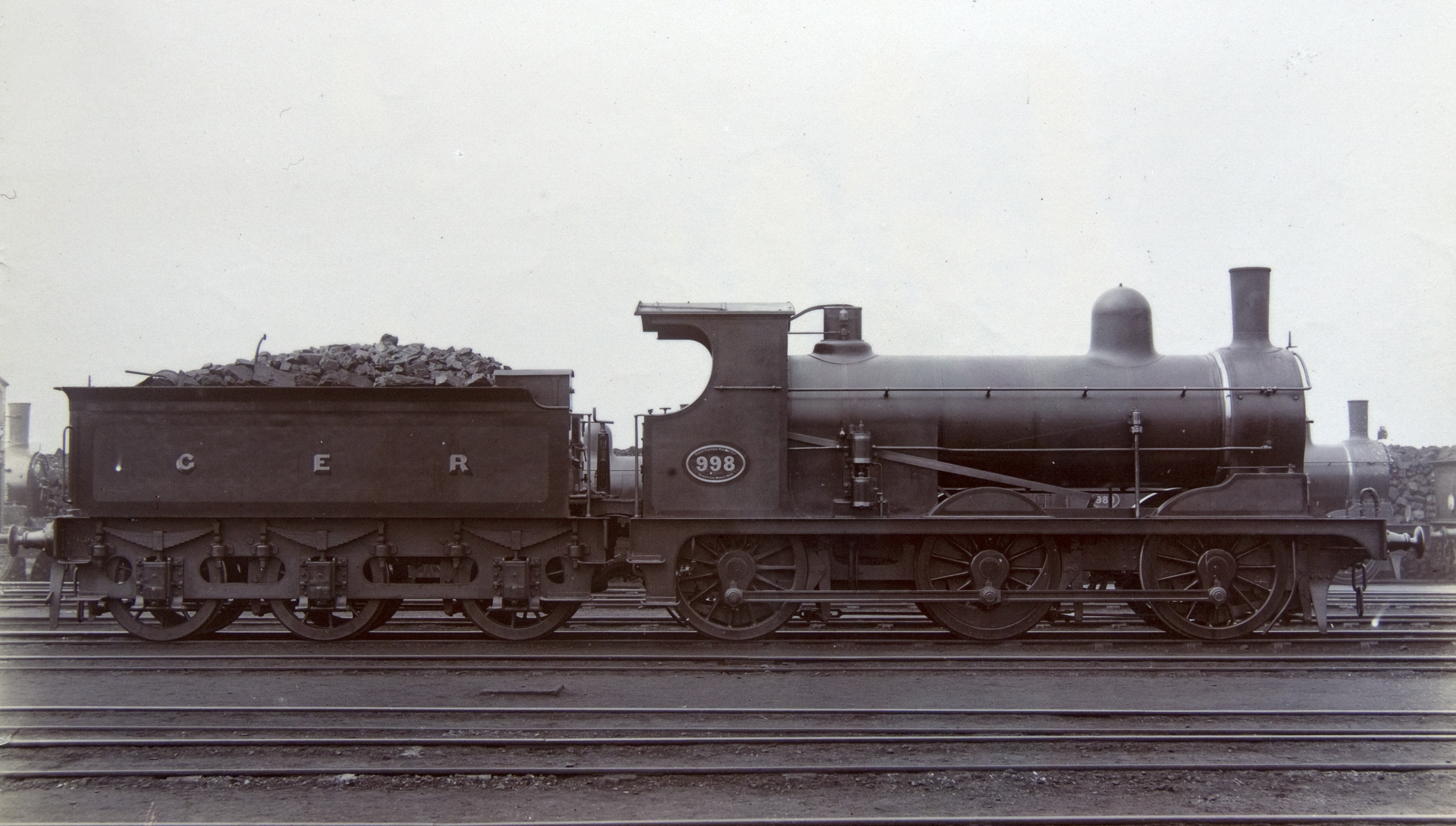
- Great Eastern Class N31 locomotive 998
Type and origin
- Power type: Steam
- Designer: James Holden
- Builder: Stratford Works
- Build date: 1893–1898
- Total produced: 81 (+1 rebuilt from Class 127)
Specifications
- Configuration
  - Whyte: 0-6-0
  - UIC: C n2
- Gauge: 4 ft 8 1/2 in (1,435 mm)
- Driver dia.: 4 ft 11 in (1.499 m)
- Wheelbase: 35 ft 5 in (10.80 m)
- Length: 47 ft 3 in (14.40 m) over buffers
- Loco weight: 38 long tons 18.5 cwt (87,200 lb or 39.5 t)
- Fuel type: Coal
- Firebox
  - Grate area: 18.0 sq ft (1.67 m^{2})
- Boiler pressure: 160 lbf/in^{2} (1.10 MPa)
- Heating surface: 1,199.5 sq ft (111.44 m^{2})
- Cylinders: Two, inside
- Cylinder size: 17.5 in × 24 in (444 mm × 610 mm)
Performance figures
- Tractive effort: 16,942 lbf (75.36 kN)
Career
- Operators: GER » LNER
- Class: GER: N31; LNER: J14
- Nicknames: Swifts
- Withdrawn: 1908–1925

The GER Class N31 was a class of eighty-two 0-6-0 steam locomotives designed by James Holden for the Great Eastern Railway. Eighteen passed to the London and North Eastern Railway (LNER) at the 1923 grouping and received the LNER classification J14.

== History ==
These goods locomotives had 17.5-by-24-inch (444 mm × 610 mm) cylinders, 4-foot-11-inch (1.499 m) driving wheels, and a 160-pound-force-per-square-inch (1,100 kPa) boiler. Eighty-one were built at Stratford Works between 1893 and 1898.

== Table of orders and numbers ==
Table of orders and numbers
Year	Order	Quantity	GER Nos.	Notes
1893	N31	1	999	
1893	H33	10	979–988	
1894	L33	10	989–998	
1894	E34	10	969–978	
1896	N37	10	959–968	
1897	H40	10	949–958	
1897	O41	10	602–608, 946–948	
1898	G42	10	542–551	
1898	K43	10	562–571	

== Class 127 ==
In addition, when the Class 127 locomotive was rebuilt from compound to simple in 1895, it was then included into Class N31.

== Performance ==
They were not particularly successful locomotives. Although nicknamed Swifts, they were sluggish locomotives, due to the placement of the valve chests underneath the cylinders.

== Withdrawals ==
Withdrawals started in 1908, and by the end of 1922, only eighteen were left in service. The LNER allocated numbers 7000 higher than the locomotives' GER numbers, but withdrawals continued, and by 1925 the class was extinct.

Table of withdrawals
Year	Quantity in service at start of year	Quantity withdrawn	Locomotive numbers
1908	82	1	971
1909	81	18	546, 549, 565, 566, 570, 571, 602, 605, 608, 950, 953–955, 957, 966, 969, 972, 975
1910	63	14	542, 550, 563, 568, 569, 603, 606, 956, 962, 974, 982, 989, 990, 991
1911	49	9	547, 551, 562, 567, 958, 960, 961, 988, 997
1912	40	6	544, 949, 952, 967, 968, 996
1913	34	3	607, 979, 935 (ex-127)
1914	31	3	0545, 0564, 947
1915	28	1	946
1916	27	1	994
1920	26	2	0543, 999
1921	24	1	965
1922	23	5	548, 948, 986, 992, 995
1923	18	6	959, 970, 976, 980, 985, 993
1924	12	5	951, 963, 964, 977, 978
1925	7	7	604, 973, 981, 983, 984, 987, 998
