= NCC Class B3 =

Class of Northern Irish 4-4-0 locomotives

Type and origin
- Power type: Steam
- Builder: Beyer, Peacock & Company, Manchester
- Build date: 1890–1898
- Rebuilder: NCC, York Road works, Belfast
- Rebuild date: 1927–1931
Specifications
- Configuration
  - Whyte: 4-4-0
- Gauge: 5 ft 3 in (1,600 mm)
- Leading dia.: 3 ft 0 in (0.914 m)
- Driver dia.: 6 ft 0 in (1.829 m)
- Wheelbase: 40 ft 9 1/4 in (12.43 m) including tender
- Length: 49 ft 6 in (15.09 m)
- Width: 8 ft 4 in (2.54 m)
- Height: 13 ft 2 in (4.01 m)
- Axle load: 16 long tons 0 cwt (35,800 lb or 16.2 t)
- Adhesive weight: 30 long tons 8 cwt (68,100 lb or 30.9 t)
- Loco weight: 45 long tons 2 cwt (101,000 lb or 45.8 t)
- Total weight: 72 long tons 0 cwt (161,300 lb or 73.2 t)
- Fuel type: Coal
- Fuel capacity: 6 long tons (13,400 lb (6.1 t)
- Water cap.: 2,120 imperial gallons (9,600 L; 2,550 US gal)
- Boiler pressure: Nos.21, 24, 28: 160 psi (1.10 MPa); Nos.60, 61: 200 psi (1.38 MPa)
- Heating surface
  - Firebox: 103 sq ft (9.6 m^{2})
  - Tubes: 508.7 sq ft (47.26 m^{2})
  - Total surface: 1,038 sq ft (96.4 m^{2})
- Superheater
  - Heating area: 233.7 sq ft (21.71 m^{2})
- Cylinders: Two
- Cylinder size: 18 in × 24 in (457 mm × 610 mm)
- Valve gear: Walschaerts
- Valve type: 8-inch (203 mm) piston valves
- Train brakes: Automatic vacuum
Performance figures
- Tractive effort: Nos.21, 24, 28: 14,688 lbf (65.3 kN); Nos.60, 61: 18,360 lbf (81.7 kN)
Career
- Operators: Northern Counties Committee
- Number in class: 5
- Nicknames: Whippet
- Scrapped: 1938–1947

The LMS (Northern Counties Committee) Class B3 4-4-0 passenger steam locomotives were rebuilds of Belfast and Northern Counties Railway (BNCR) two-cylinder compound locomotives. They operated services throughout the NCC's 5 ft 3 in (1,600 mm) broad gauge system in the north-east of Ireland.

== History ==
The locomotives that comprised the Northern Counties Committee Class B3 were rebuilds of two classes of BNCR "Light Compounds". These had been built by Beyer, Peacock & Company in the 1890s to the design of the BNCR Locomotive Engineer Bowman Malcolm. The first two members of the class were originally Class C Light Compound 2-4-0s. Rebuilding began with No. 28 in 1927 and No. 21 in the following year. The other three Class B3 locomotives (24, 60 and 61) were derived from Class B Light Compounds whose only original difference was that they had always been 4-4-0s and not 2-4-0s.

However, before alteration to Class B3, Nos. 60 and 61 had already undergone an earlier rebuilding to become Class B1 compounds in 1921 to be followed by No. 51 in August 1926. By contrast, No. 24 was rebuilt as a simple (i.e. not compound) in February 1925 to become the solitary member of the somewhat ephemeral Class B2.

All five engines had 18 by 24 inches (460 mm × 610 mm) cylinders with 8-inch (203 mm) piston valves and retained their 6 ft 0 in (1.829 m) driving wheels. The first three members of the class had boilers rated at 160 psi (1.10 MPa) but Nos.60 and 61 had the advantage of 200 psi (1.38 MPa) boilers.

During rebuilding, they were fitted with LMS standard boilers that had to be placed higher than the originals to allow the firebox and ash pan to clear the rear driving wheel axle. The smokebox saddle was extended accordingly to offer support. The closely coupled driving wheels accentuated the appearance of the high-pitched boiler, earning these engines the nickname of "Whippet" because of a perceived resemblance to the breed of racing dog.

All members of the class were officially named after Ulster counties.

No. 28 was withdrawn in December 1938, having run just over a quarter million miles in her rebuilt form. The remaining locomotives served throughout World War II and were scrapped in 1946–1947.

=== Building and withdrawal data ===
The following table summarises the rebuilding and renumbering history of the Class B3 locomotives.

Original No.	Class	Date Built	Date Rebuilt	Class	Rebuilt to B3	New No.	Name	Scrapped
51	C	May 1890	1926 August	B1	December 1928	21	County Down	June 1947
24	B	May 1898	1925 February	B2	September 1928	24	County Londonderry	June 1947
58	C	April 1890	—	—	June 1927	28	County Tyrone	December 1938
60	B	July 1897	1921	B1	June 1932	60	County Donegal	October 1946
61	B	October 1897	1921	B1	January 1932	61	County Antrim	October 1946

== Livery ==
The Class B3 locomotives were painted in crimson lake with yellow and black lining. The LMS crest was carried on the upper cab sides. The initials "NCC" in shaded serif gold capital letters were placed centrally on the tender sides. Number plates were brass with raised digits and edge; they were carried on the lower cab sides with another placed centrally on the back of the tender tank. Curved nameplates were fitted above the leading driving wheel splashers. Buffer beams and number plate and name plate backgrounds were painted red. The engine number was applied to the front buffer beam in shaded gold digits.
