= Engine number =

Identification number marked on an engine

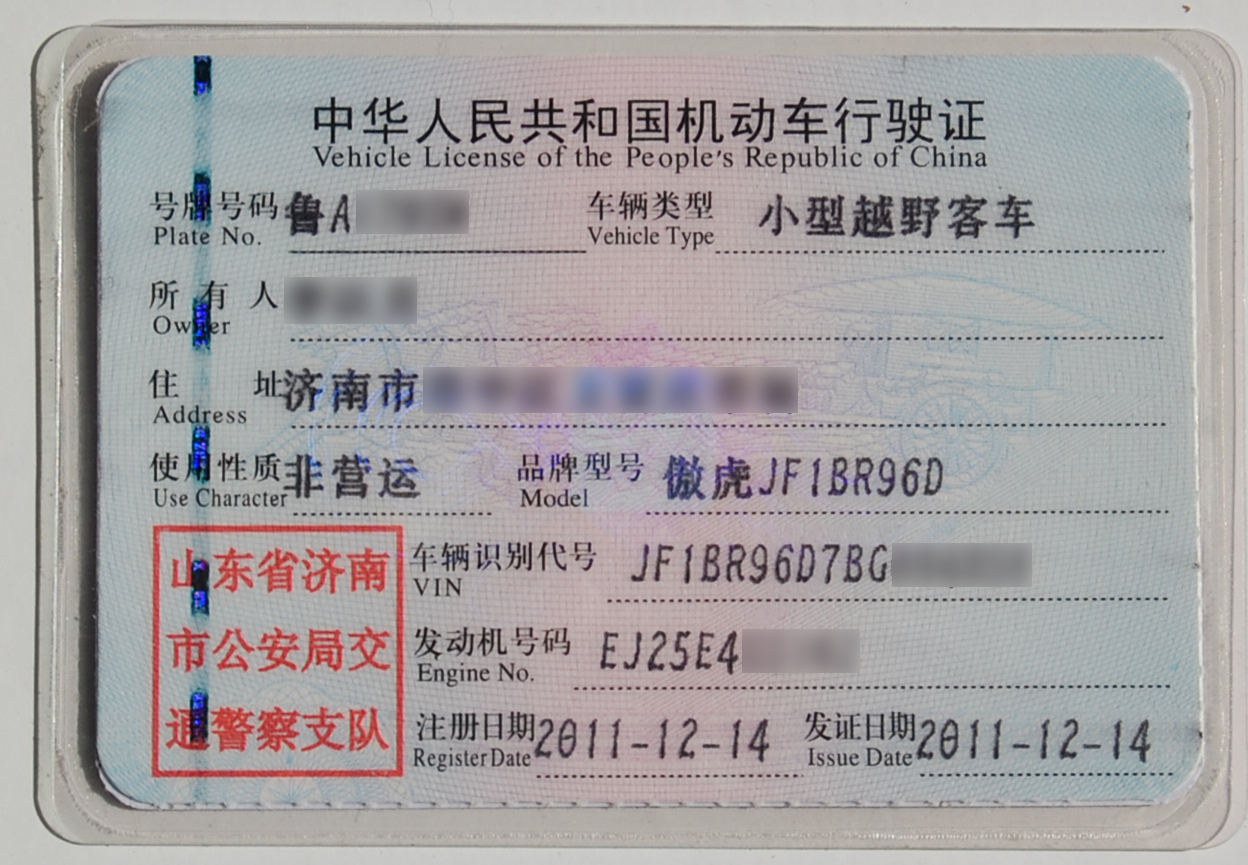
Engine number is recorded in Vehicle License of China

Engine number may refer to an identification number marked on the engine of a vehicle or, in the case of locomotives, to the road number of the locomotive. The engine number is separate from the Vehicle Identification Number (VIN).

== Automobiles ==
Every vehicle engine is marked with an engine number by the factory. The engine number includes coded information, which can be decoded to reveal, for example, year of manufacture, country of manufacture, and engine type.

== Trains ==
The term is also used in train terminology. In this instance, it refers to the road number assigned to motive power by the operator, as opposed to a constructor's or builder's number (equivalent to a vehicle VIN number).

== See also ==
- Aircraft engine position number
- Builder's plate
- Number plate
