= Bowman Malcolm =

Irish railway engineer (1854–1933)

Bowman Malcolm (1854 – January, 1933) was an Irish railway engineer. He became Locomotive Superintendent of the Belfast and Northern Counties Railway (BNCR) at the age of 22 and later took on the additional role of Civil Engineer. He was an advocate of compound locomotives which he introduced to the BNCR.

== Biography ==
The son of a Unitarian minister, Bowman Malcolm was born at Chester in north-west England. Following the death of his father at an early age, however, the family returned to its roots in Belfast. He was educated at the Royal Belfast Academical Institution (RBAI) and Belfast Royal Academy (BRA).

Malcolm joined the Belfast and Northern Counties Railway at the age of 16 in 1870 as a pupil in the Locomotive Engineer's office. That he made tremendous headway with his employers is demonstrated by the fact that when the Locomotive Superintendent, Robert Findlay, resigned due to ill health in 1876, Malcolm was appointed to succeed him in this responsible position aged only 22 years.

In this role he directed the construction and rebuilding of locomotives, coaches and goods wagons and the introduction of the von Borries two-cylinder compound locomotive to the BNCR. During his tenure he oversaw the fitting of the automatic vacuum brake to all passenger stock.

In 1891 he was offered a position similar to his work in the United Kingdom for a railroad company in South America "at a very tempting salary," but he declined the offer citing family obligations. The continuing confidence that the Directors had in Malcolm's ability was shown when he was additionally appointed Chief Civil Engineer to the Northern Counties Committee (NCC) of the Midland Railway (which the BNCR had become) in 1906. He also filled a similar position for the Donegal Railway.

A member of the Council of the Institute of Mechanical Engineers, Malcolm was also a member of the Institution of Civil Engineers and a past President of the Belfast Association of Engineers. Other professional affiliations included the Association of Railway and Locomotive Engineers and the Permanent Way Institution.

He retired from the NCC at the end of 1922, having completed 52 years service with the company, of which 46 years had been as Locomotive Superintendent.

Bowman Malcolm was married on 25 September 1883 to Mary Elizabeth Montgomery of Donegal.

Besides his railway career, Malcolm was interested in educational matters and was a deputy governor of one of his old schools, RBAI. For many years he had also been on the Governing Committee of the Fountain Street School in Belfast.

Bowman Malcolm died at his home in Belfast in January 1933 aged 78. He was survived by his widow and two daughters.

== Engineering achievements ==
Bowman Malcolm shrewdly took an interest in international engineering developments and he saw what von Borries was doing in Germany. Two-cylinder von Borries compound locomotives had been performing sterling service on express trains in Prussia. Thomas Worsdell had followed up the idea on the Great Eastern and North Eastern railways in England and Bowman Malcolm was to bring it to Ireland.

An extensive study of these two-cylinder compound locomotives was created for the BNCR. There were "Heavy Compounds" and "Light Compounds" which included small 2-4-0s with a peculiarly truncated appearance. Noteworthy were the two Class D 4-4-0s Jubilee and Parkmount which had 7-foot-diameter driving wheels (2.1 m). A 2-4-2T version, Class S, was designed for the narrow gauge Ballymena and Larne and the Retreat lines. A good number of these locomotives were to survive throughout the LMS NCC period although many were rebuilt to two-cylinder simple expansion.

Malcolm was interested in steam brakes and took out several patents for improvements to this type of brake.

On the civil engineering side, Bowman Malcolm's greatest achievement must be the railway bridge over the River Bann at Coleraine which opened in March 1924. This was built to replace an older bridge dating from 1860. The construction of this 800-foot-long bridge (240 m) was carried out to his design and largely under his supervision. It included an opening span on the Strauss underhung bascule principle that was to be the first application of its type in the United Kingdom.
