= BNCR Class B =

Class of two-cylinder compound locomotives

Type and origin
- Power type: Steam
- Builder: Beyer, Peacock & Company
- Build date: 1897–1898
- Total produced: 5
Specifications
- Configuration
  - Whyte: 4-4-0
  - UIC: 2′B
- Gauge: 5 ft 3 in (1,600 mm)
- Leading dia.: 3 ft 0 in (0.914 m)
- Driver dia.: 6 ft 0 in (1.829 m)
- Wheelbase: 39 ft 0 1/2 in (11.90 m)
- Length: 47 ft 8 1/2 in (14.54 m)
- Width: 8 ft 4 in (2.54 m)
- Height: 13 ft 2 in (4.01 m)
- Axle load: 14 ton 0 cwt + 12 ton 6 cwt
- Adhesive weight: 26 long tons 6 cwt (58,900 lb or 26.7 t)
- Loco weight: 39 long tons 17 cwt (89,300 lb or 40.5 t)
- Tender weight: 28 long tons 17 cwt (64,600 lb or 29.3 t)
- Total weight: 68 long tons 14 cwt (153,900 lb or 69.8 t)
- Fuel type: Coal
- Fuel capacity: 6 long tons (6.1 t)
- Water cap.: 2,090 imp gal (9,500 L; 2,510 US gal)
- Boiler pressure: 160 psi (1.10 MPa)
- Heating surface
  - Firebox: 87.91 sq ft (8.167 m^{2})
  - Tubes: 705.24 sq ft (65.519 m^{2}) (later arrangement)
  - Total surface: 795.15 sq ft (73.872 m^{2})
- Cylinders: Two
- High-pressure cylinder: LHS: 16 in × 24 in (406 mm × 610 mm)
- Low-pressure cylinder: RHS: 23.25 in × 24 in (591 mm × 610 mm)
- Valve gear: Walschaerts
- Train brakes: Automatic vacuum
Performance figures
- Tractive effort: 11,560 lbf (51.4 kN)
- Factor of adh.: 5.09
Career
- Operators: BNCR; NCC
- Numbers: 24, 59–62
- Withdrawn: 1924–1932
- Disposition: All rebuilt as classes U1, B1 and B2

The Belfast and Northern Counties Railway Class B was a class of 4-4-0 two-cylinder compound steam locomotives that was introduced for passenger service in the north-east of Ireland during the late 1890s.

== History ==
The Belfast and Northern Counties Railway (BNCR) in the north-east of Ireland had standardised on locomotives with a 2-4-0 wheel arrangement for its principal passenger locomotives during the 1870s and construction continued through to the mid-1890s. With increasing loads and heavier trains the limitations of that wheel arrangement became apparent and a new design was needed. In 1897 the first purpose-built 4-4-0s, the Class B "Light Compounds", entered service.

Built by Beyer, Peacock & Company in Manchester, England, the Class B was turned out as a 4-4-0 version of the Class C 2-4-0 that had been introduced during 1890–95. With the same type of boiler and identical cylinder sizes, it was no more powerful than the earlier design.

Two of the class, Nos.59 and 62 were "renewed" in 1924 as Class U1 4-4-0 locomotives although probably very little remained of the original engines except for their wheels and valve gear.

The other three members of the class received less radical rebuilding. Nos.60 and 61 were firstly rebuilt as Class B1 compounds following which they underwent further alterations to become Class B3 4-4-0s in 1932. No.24 was rebuilt as a simple to become the only member of Class B2 in 1925 and again to Class B3 in 1928.

== Livery ==
The BNCR painted the locomotives "invisible green" (a very dark bronze green that looked almost black) with vermilion, light blue and yellow lining. The initials "BNCR" in block capitals were carried on the tender sides.

The livery remained the same under Midland Railway administration with the addition of the diamond-shaped Midland Railway crest to the cab sides and the initials "NCC" in gold block capitals on the tender sides. Buffer beams were vermilion, and the smoke box was black.
