= August von Borries =

August Friedrich Wilhelm von Borries (27 January 1852 in Bad Oeynhausen – 14 February 1906) was one of Germany's most influential railway engineers, who was primarily concerned with developments in steam locomotives.

Von Borries graduated from the Royal Institute of Trade in Charlottenburg, and then spent a year working at the Bergisch-Märkische railway. In 1875, he joined the service of the Hanover division of the Prussian state railways and subsequently became their Chief Mechanical Engineer. In 1880 he designed the first Prussian compound locomotive, built by Schichau in Elbląg. This showed significant fuel savings. His work on compound locomotives was done in collaboration with the British engineer Thomas William Worsdell and the two men obtained several British patents together. The 1880 locomotive was a two-cylinder compound but, in 1899, he designed a four-cylinder compound locomotive. Another innovation was the use of nickel steel for boilers in 1891.

In 1902 he left the Prussian state railways and took a professorship of Railway Engineering at Königlich Technische Hochschule zu Berlin.

He wrote widely on locomotive matters, including a textbook on locomotives.

The Worsdell-von Borries two-cylinder compound system was also used by Bowman Malcolm, locomotive superintendent of the Belfast and Northern Counties Railway (BNCR). More than thirty such compounds were built for the BNCR between 1890 and 1901: those for the Irish Broad Gauge comprised seven 2-4-0 for passenger work (BNCR Class C), two 0-6-0 for goods (BNCR Class E) and twenty 4-4-0 for passenger (BNCR Classes D, B and A); there were also six 2-4-2T (BNCR Class S) for the narrow gauge lines of the BNCR: the Ballymena and Larne Railway and the Ballymena, Cushendall and Redbay Railway.

== See also ==
- List of railway pioneers

== Sources ==
- Die Eisenbahn-Betriebsmittel. Theil 1. Die Lokomotiven, bearb. von: August F. W. von Borries. Kreidel, Wiesbaden 1897 (Die Eisenbahn-Technik der Gegenwart, Band 1). Nachdruck: Bufe, München 1982
- Biografie: Götz von Borries: Die Geschwister von Borries. Fouqué Literaturverlag, Egelsbach/Frankfurt 1998, ISBN 3-8267-4225-7
- Marshall, John, A Biographical Dictionary of Railway Engineers, David and Charles 1978, pp 226–227, ISBN 0-7153-7489-3
