= Thomas William Worsdell =

English locomotive engineer (1838–1916)

- Born: 14 January 1838; Liverpool, England
- Died: 28 June 1916 (aged 78); Arnside, England
- Education: Ackworth School
- Parent(s): Nathaniel and Mary Worsdell
- Engineering career
- Employers: London and North Western Railway; Pennsylvania Railroad; Great Eastern Railway; North Eastern Railway

Thomas William Worsdell (14 January 1838 – 28 June 1916) was an English locomotive engineer. He was born in Liverpool into a Quaker family.

== Family ==
T. W. Worsdell – normally known as William – was the eldest son of Nathaniel Worsdell (1809–1886), and grandson of the coachbuilder Thomas Clarke Worsdell (1788–1862). His younger brother, Wilson Worsdell (1850–1920), was also a locomotive engineer. T. C. Worsdell had become a Quaker at some point between 1812 and 1816, and his descendants, including Nathaniel, William and Wilson, were brought up in the Quaker faith.

William was born at his parents' house in Liverpool on 14 January 1838. He began school at the age of two, and in 1847 was sent as a boarder to Ackworth, a Quaker school in Yorkshire, where he remained until 1852.

== Career ==
He worked at the Crewe Works of the LNWR under John Ramsbottom but in 1865 moved to the United States to the Pennsylvania Railroad. In 1871 he was invited by Francis William Webb to return to Crewe. In 1881 he was appointed locomotive superintendent of the Great Eastern Railway, but in 1885 moved to the North Eastern Railway, being replaced at the GER by James Holden. He retired from the NER on 1 October 1890 due to ill health and was replaced by his younger brother Wilson Worsdell.

He died in Arnside on 28 June 1916.

=== Locomotive designs ===
- GER Class G14 2-4-0
- GER Class G16 4-4-0
- GER Class Y14 (LNER Class J15 0-6-0)
- GER Class G15 (LNER Class Y6 0-4-0Tram)
- GER Class M15 (LNER Class F4 2-4-2T)

== Patents ==
Worsdell obtained a number of patents including several (in association with August von Borries, a Prussian locomotive engineer) relating to compound locomotives. T. W. Worsdell used the von Borries two-cylinder compound system in several of his designs for the North Eastern Railway.

Worsdell-von Borries patents

- GB190006487, published 16 February 1901, An improvement in starting valves for compound steam engines
- GB190022906, published 2 November 1901, Improvements in valves for use in compound locomotives and other compound engines
- US803981 (with Herbert Richard Lapage), published 7 November 1905, Compound locomotive

The Worsdell-von Borries two-cylinder compound system was also used by Bowman Malcolm, locomotive superintendent of the Belfast and Northern Counties Railway (BNCR). More than thirty such compounds were built for the BNCR between 1890 and 1901: those for the Irish Broad Gauge comprised seven 2-4-0 for passenger work (BNCR Class C), two 0-6-0 for goods (BNCR Class E) and twenty 4-4-0 for passenger (BNCR Classes D, B and A); there were also six 2-4-2T (BNCR Class S) for the narrow gauge lines of the BNCR: the Ballymena and Larne Railway and the Ballymena, Cushendall and Redbay Railway.

Business positions
Preceded by Massey Bromley	Locomotive Superintendent of the Great Eastern Railway; 1881–1885	Succeeded by James Holden
Preceded by Alexander McDonnell	Locomotive Superintendent of the North Eastern Railway; 1885–1890	Succeeded by Wilson Worsdell
