= List of steam locomotives in Ireland =

This is a list of all steam locomotives currently residing within the Island of Ireland.

== Preserved locomotives ==
=== 5ft3in Gauge ===
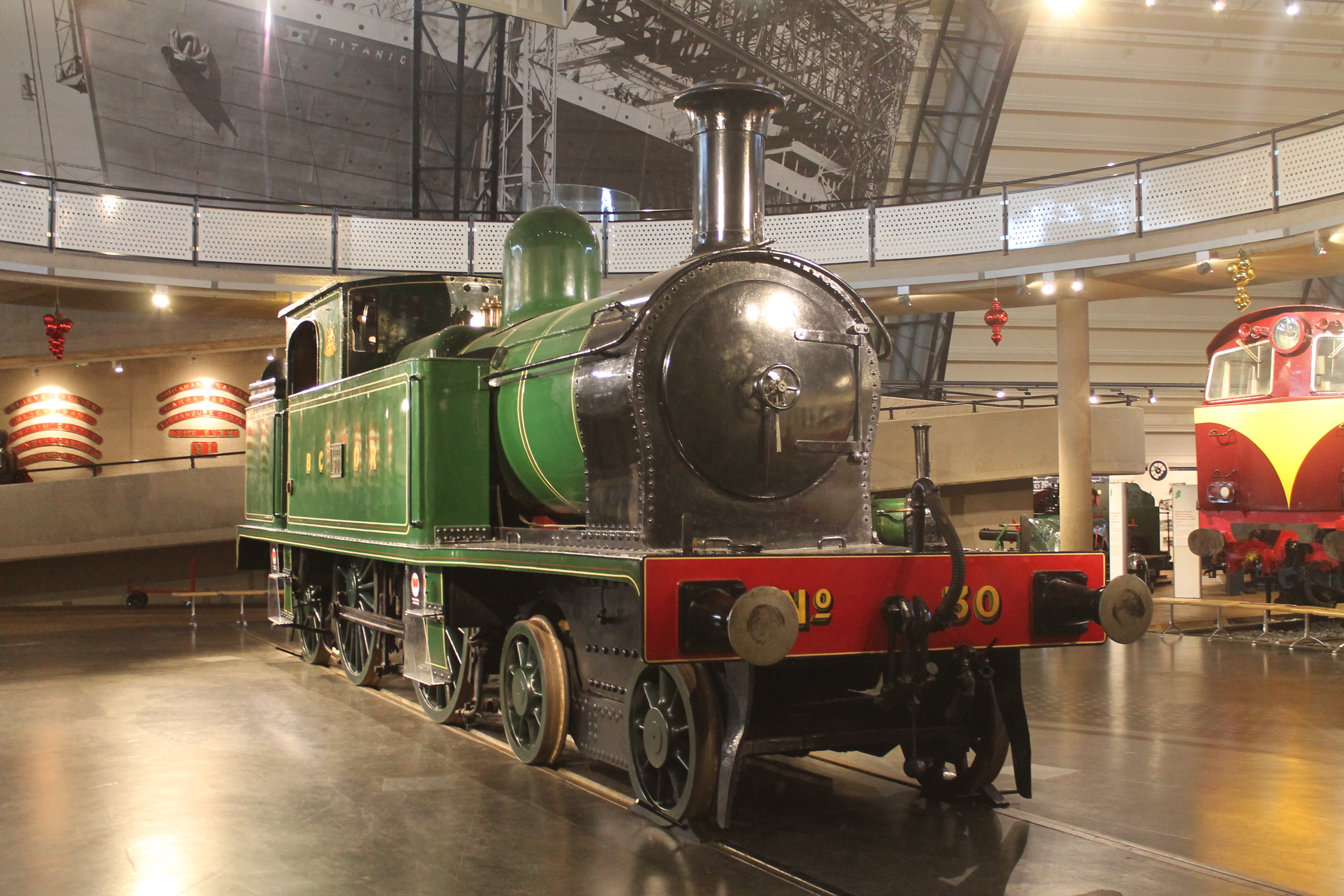
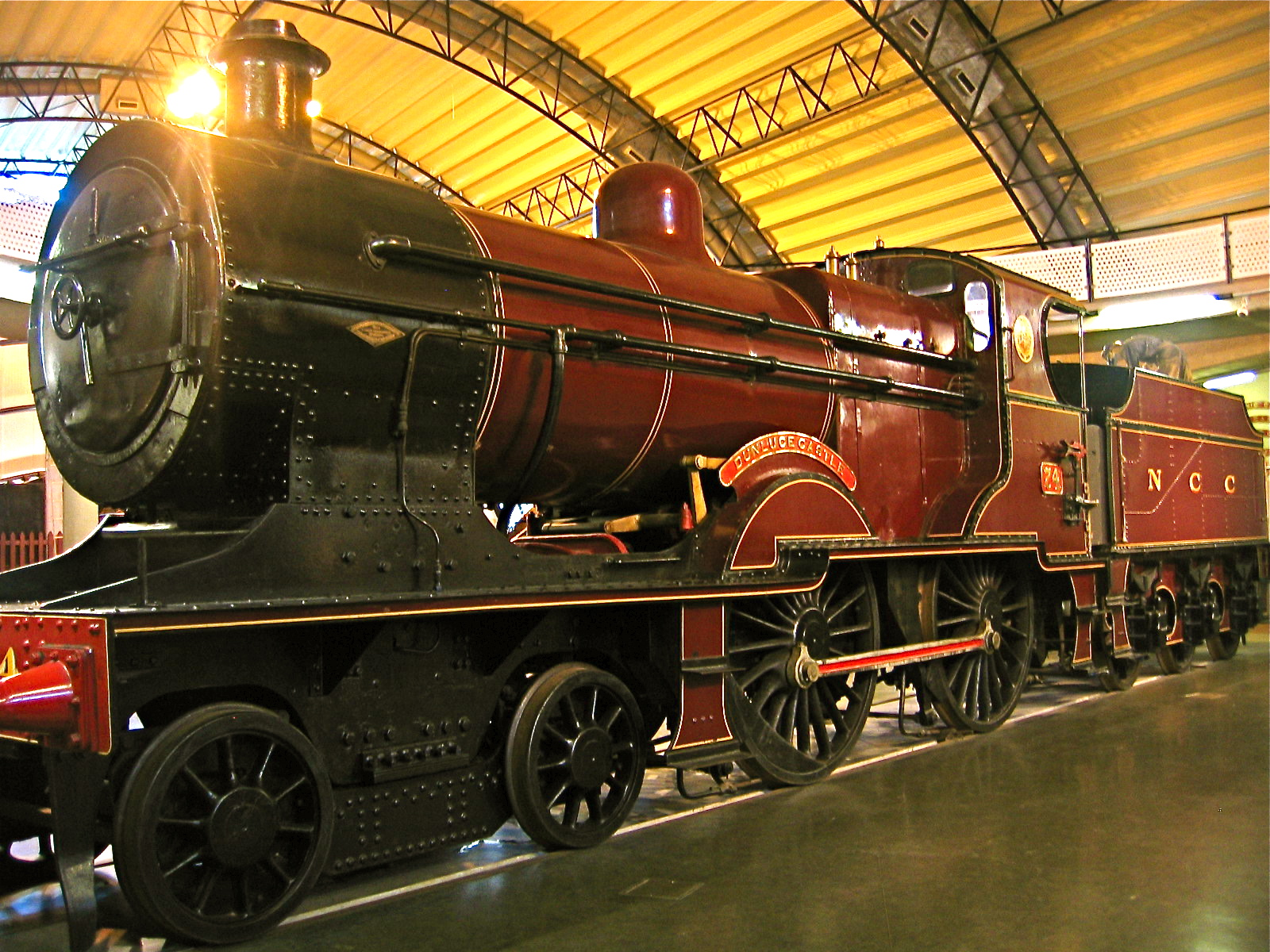
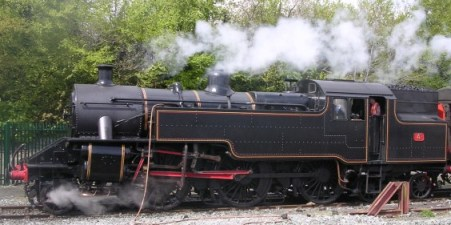
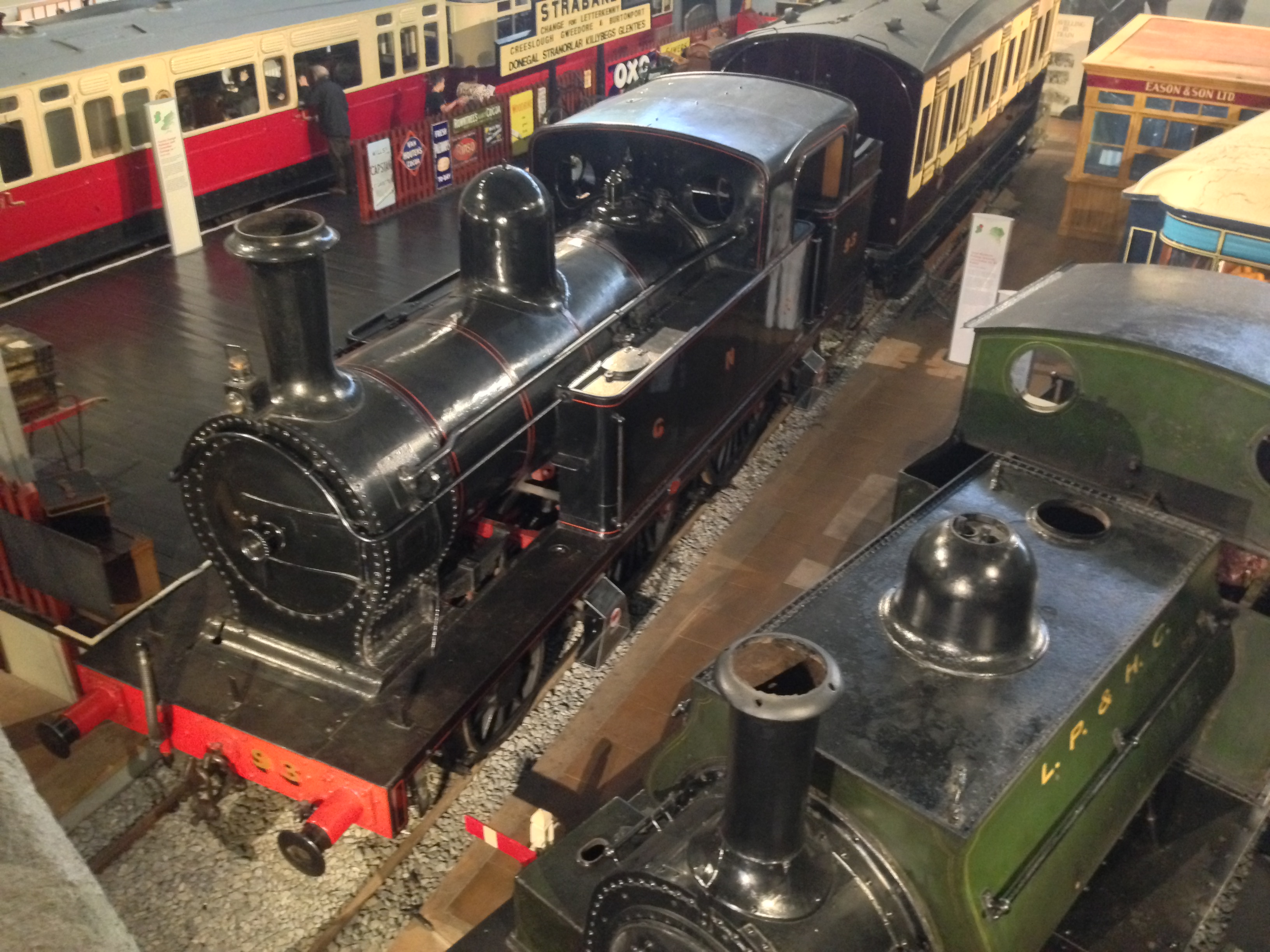
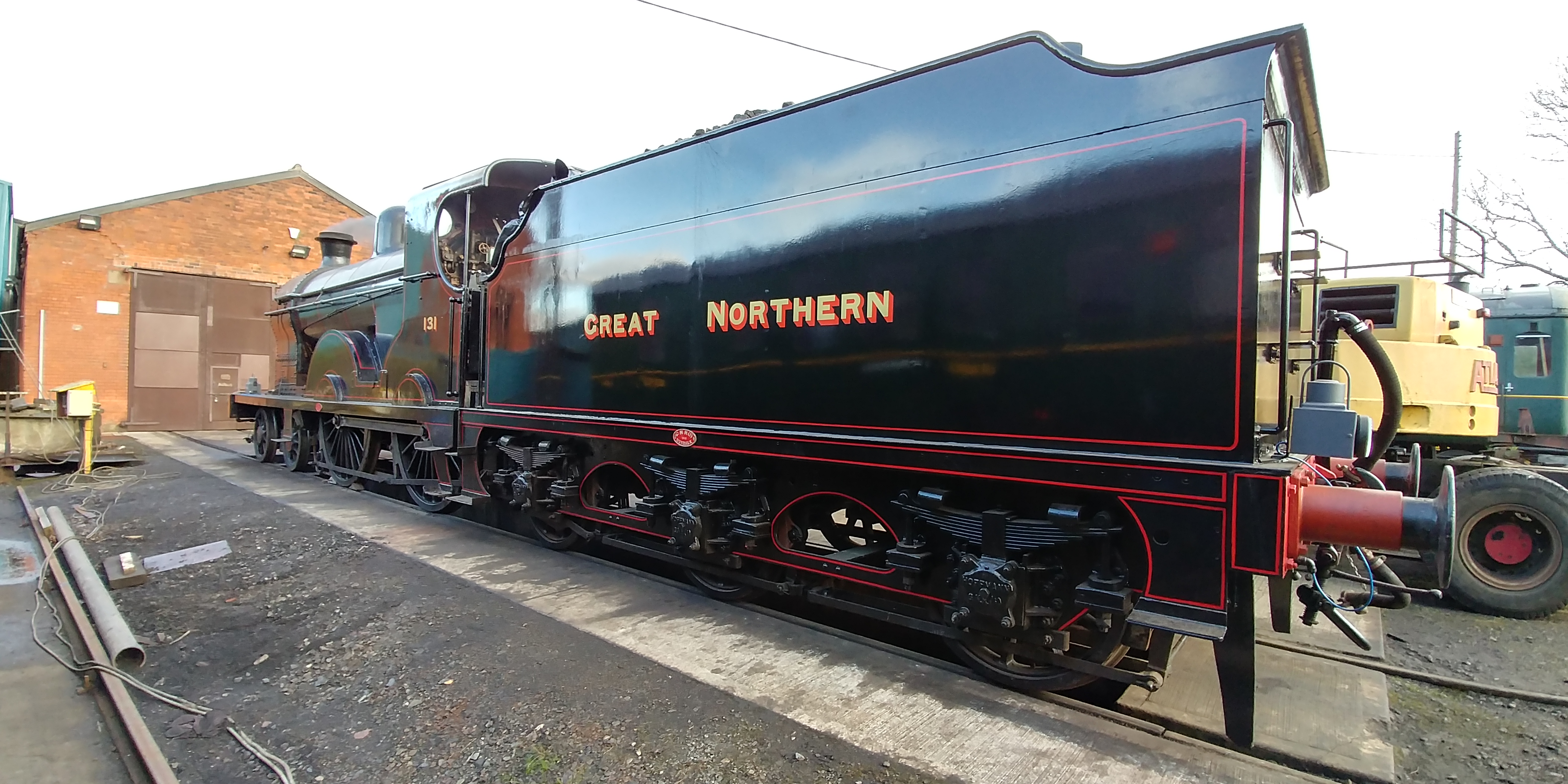
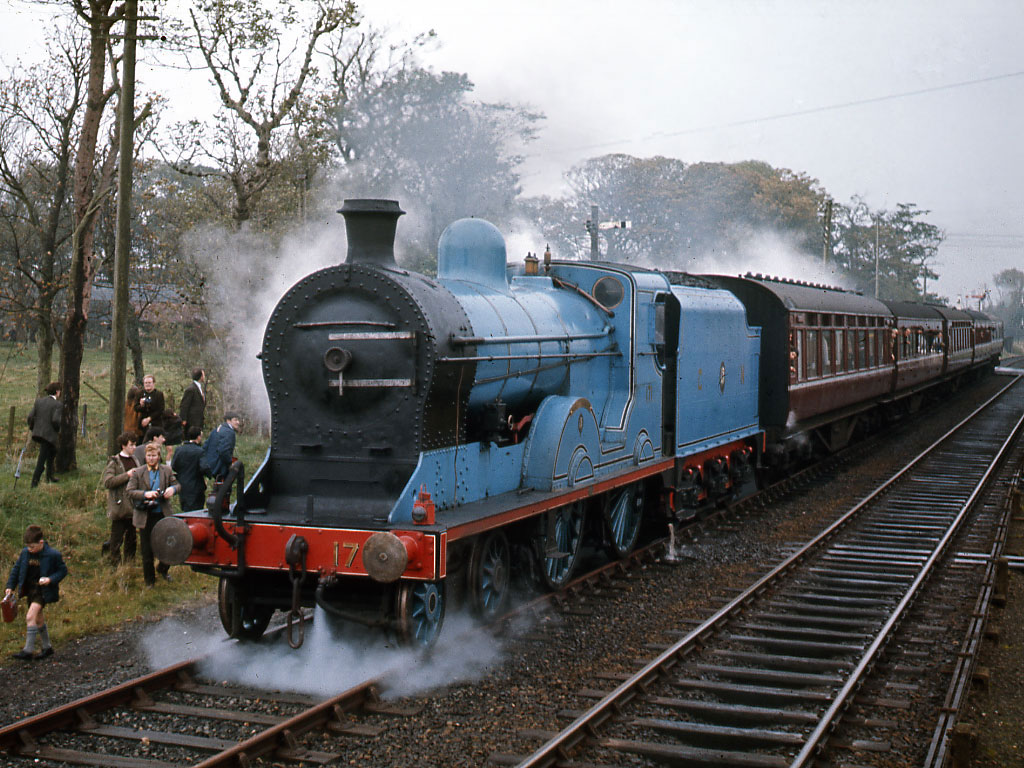
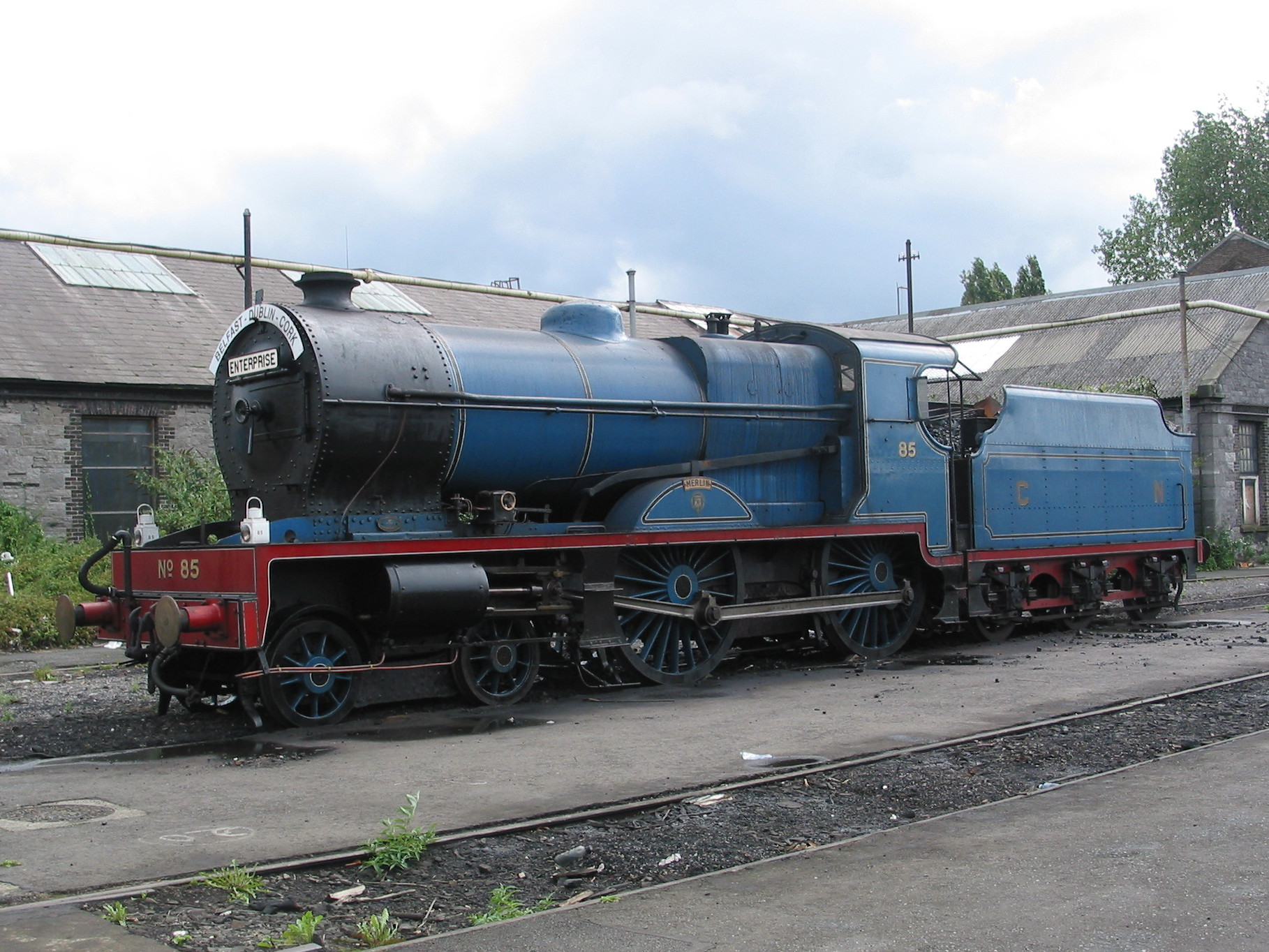
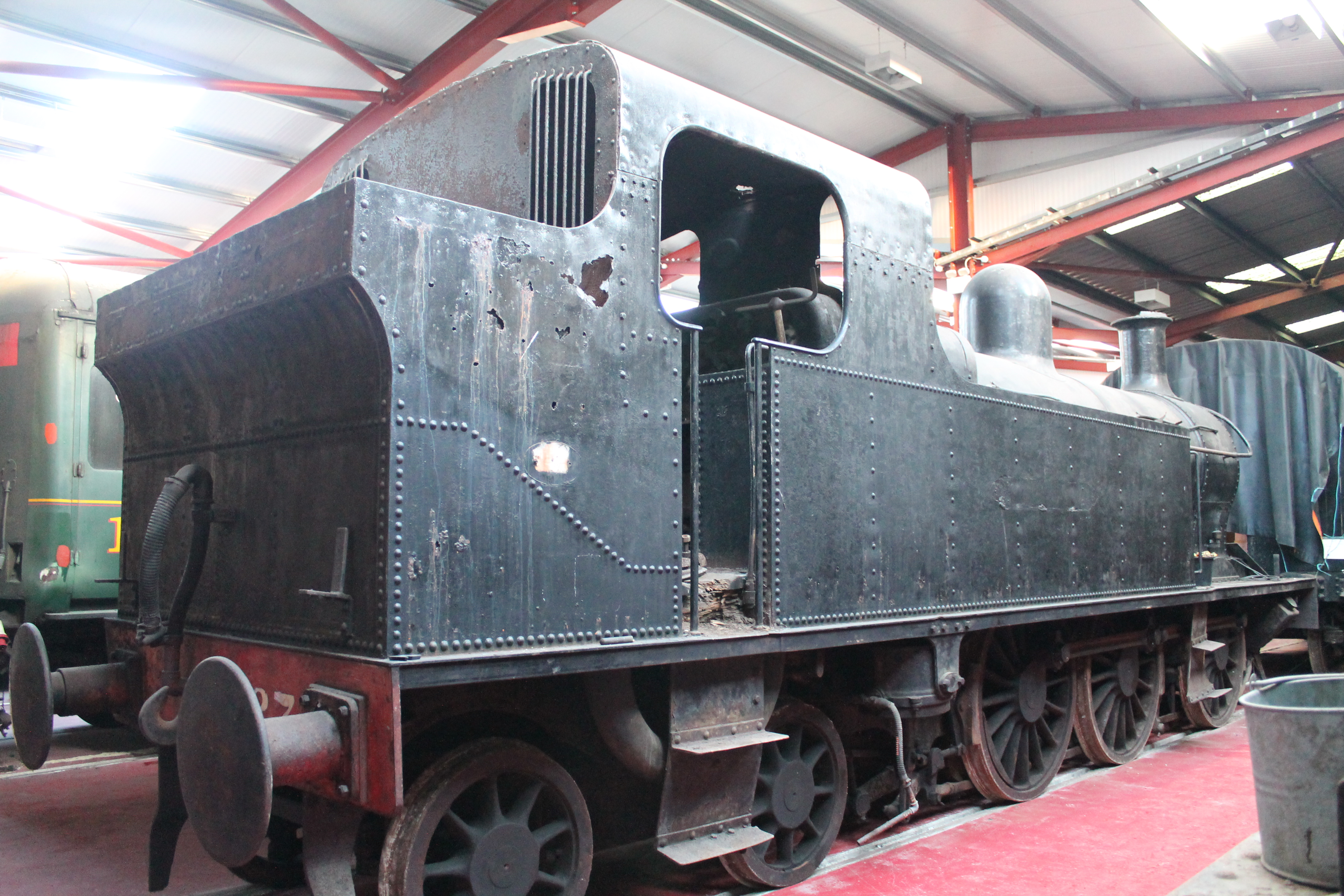
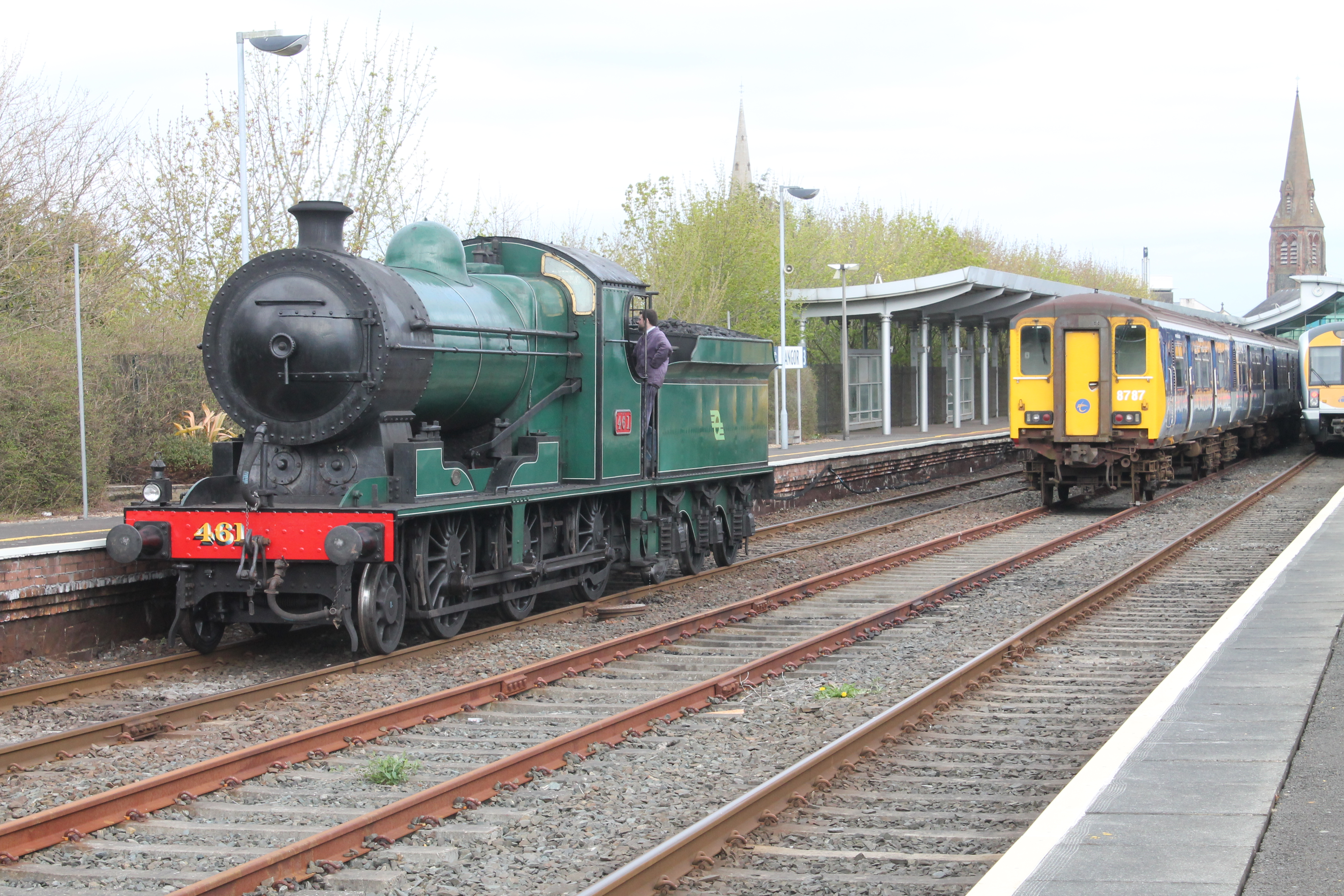
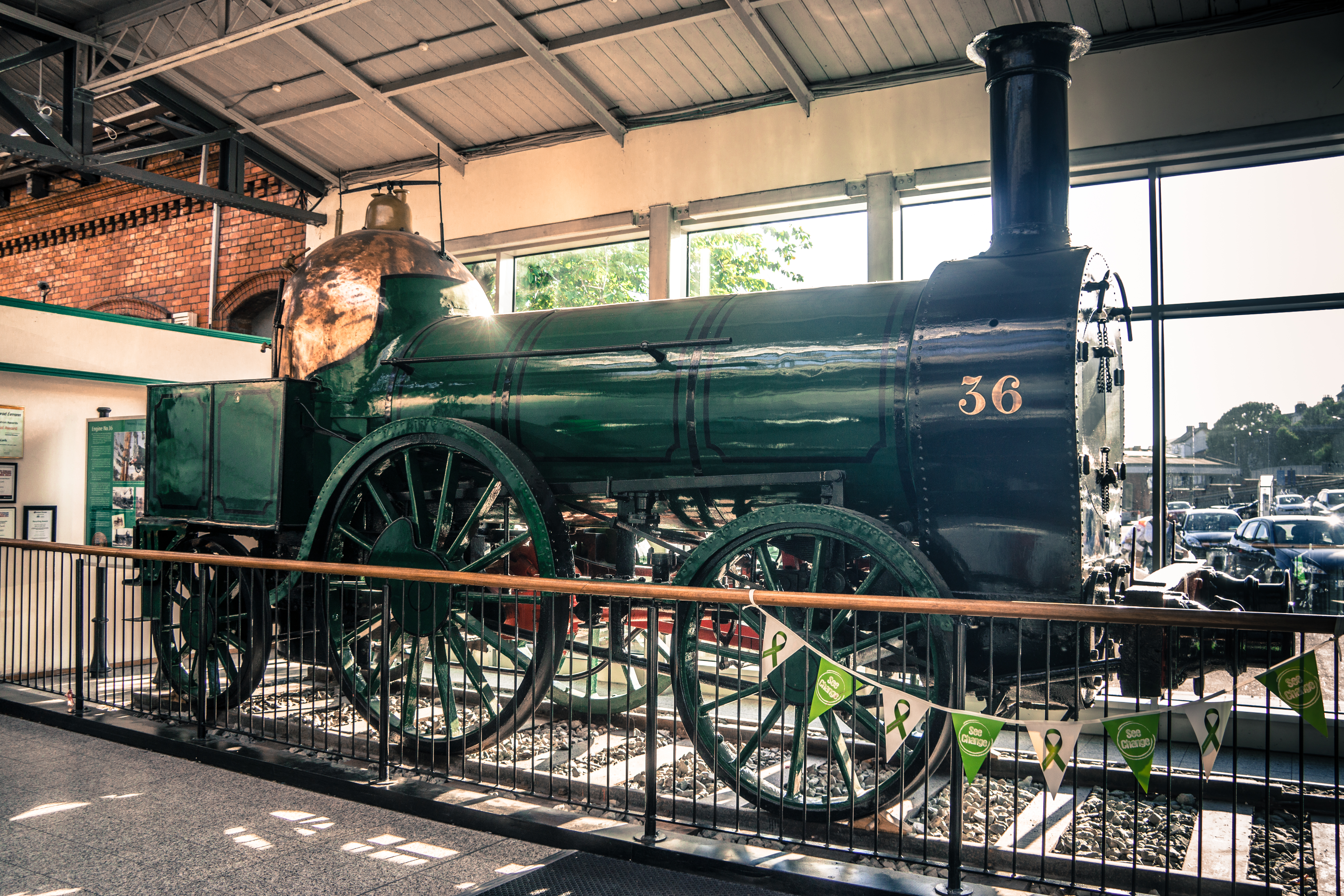
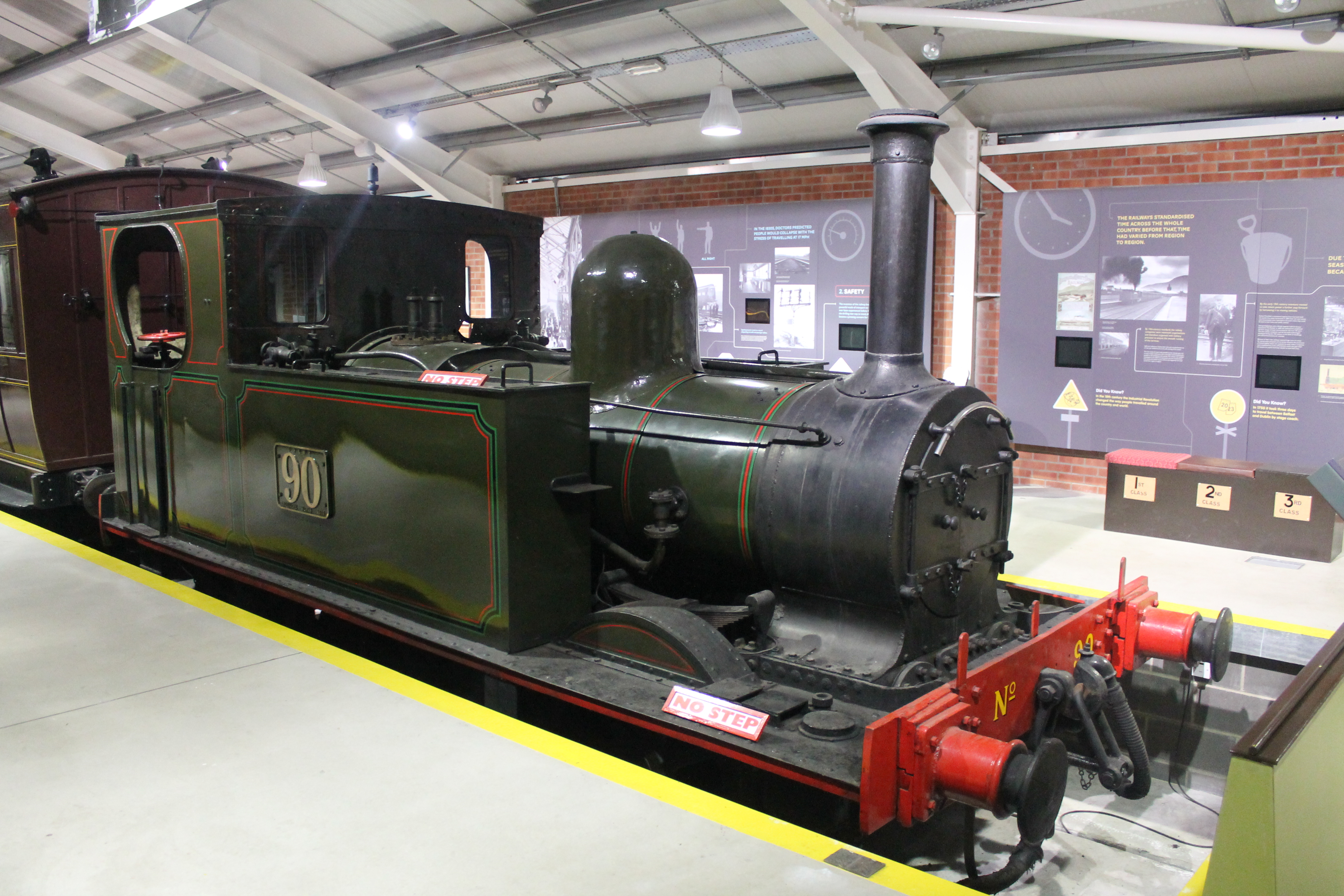
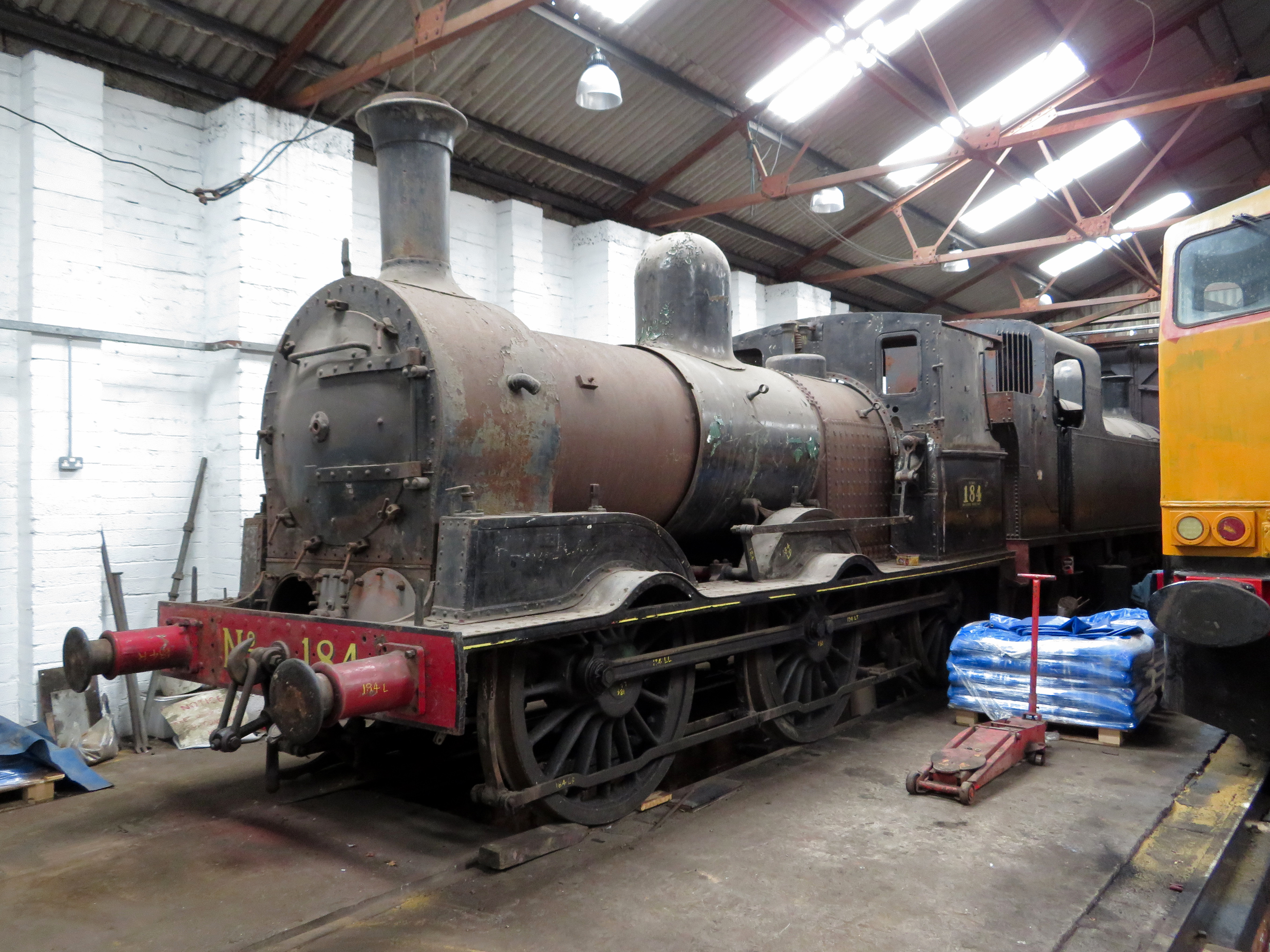
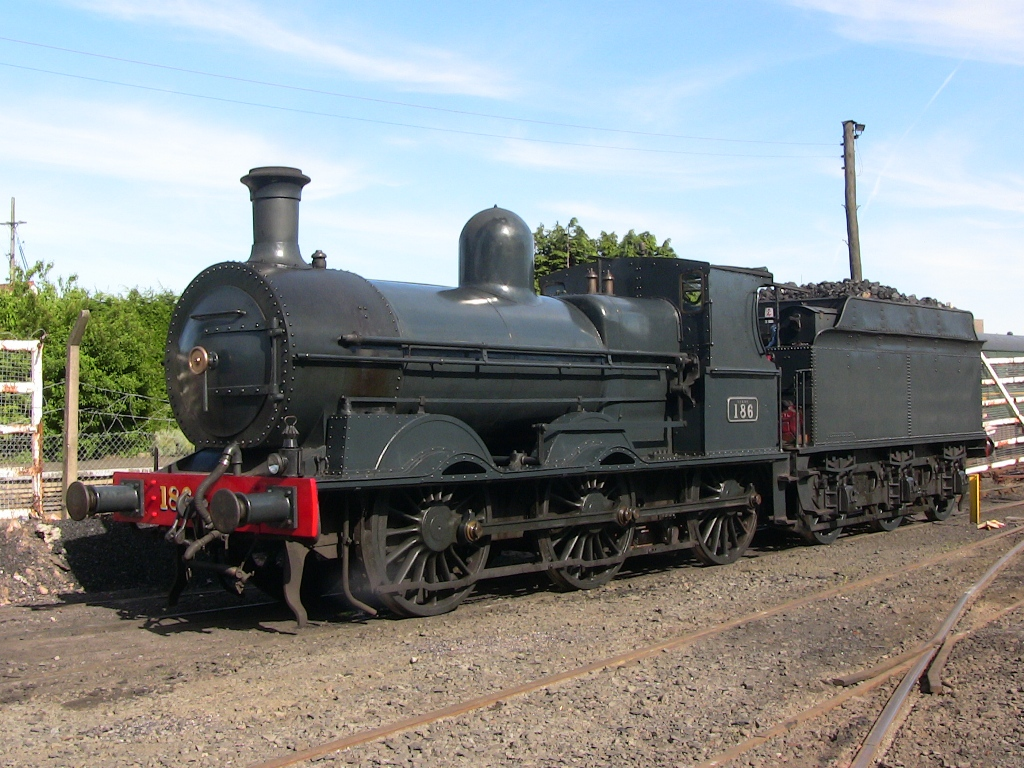
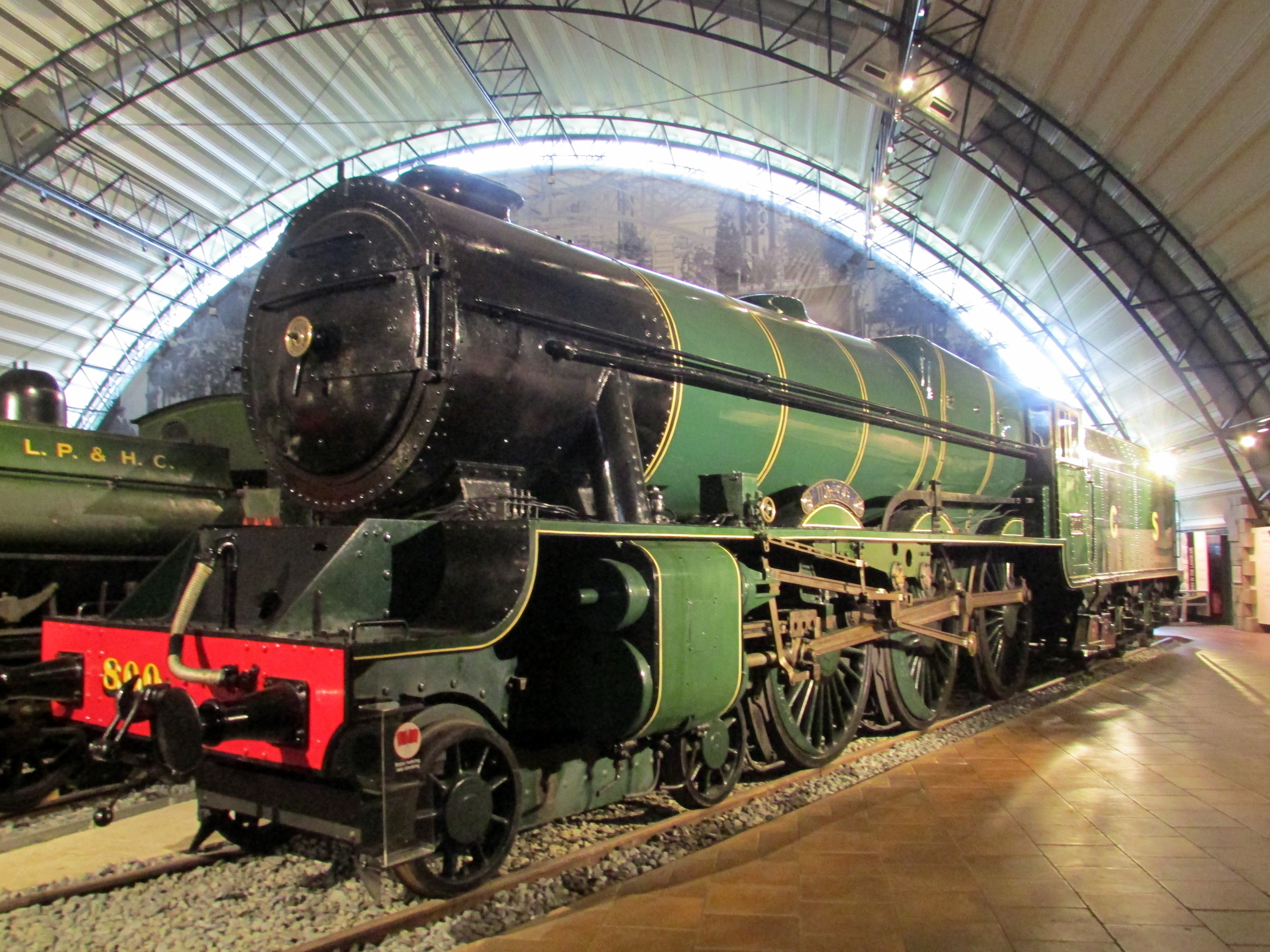
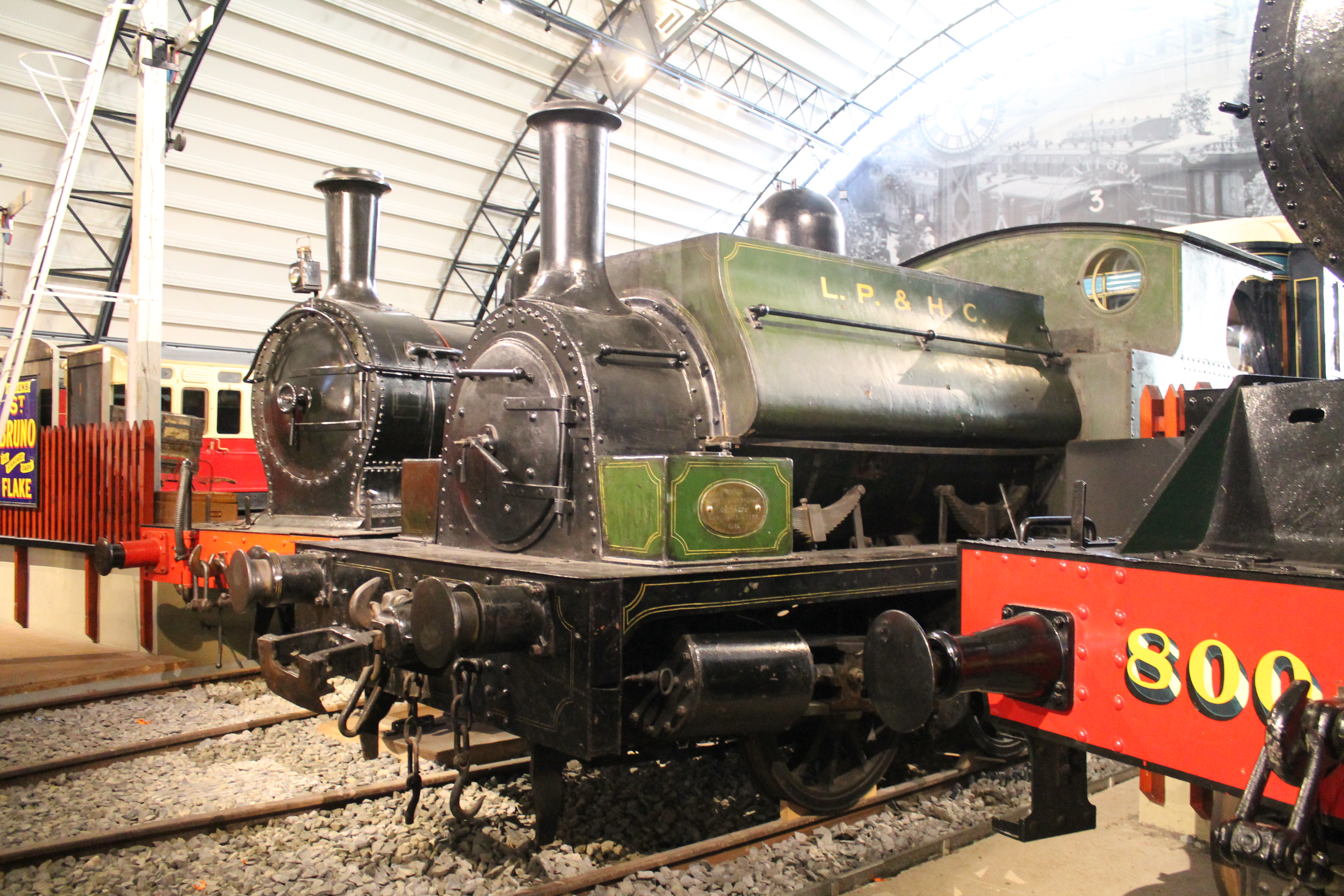
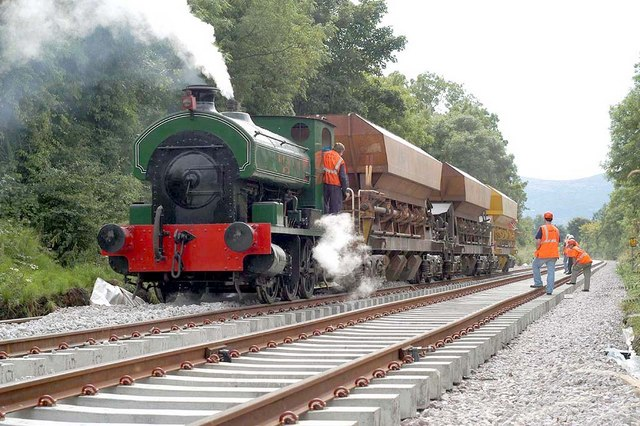
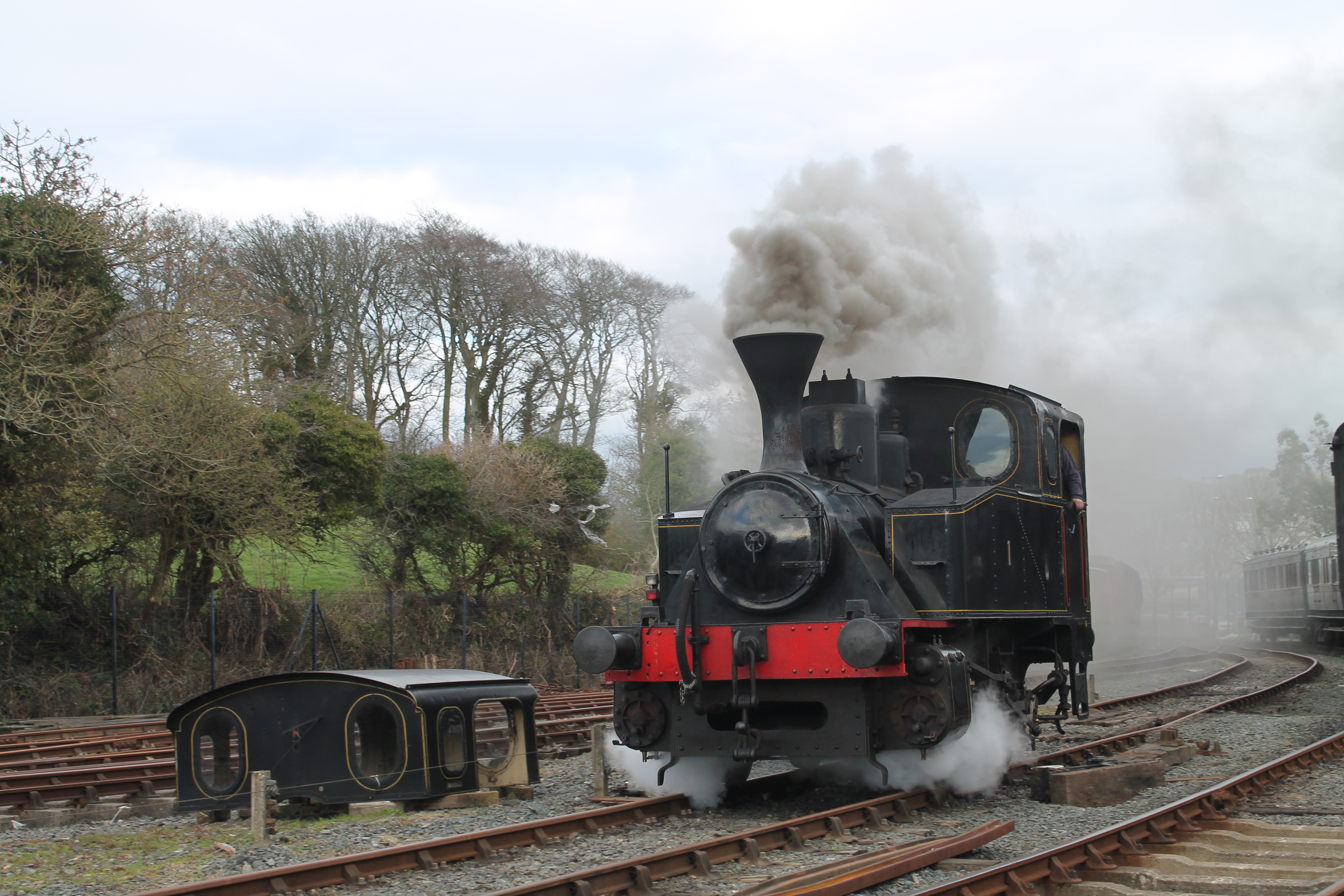
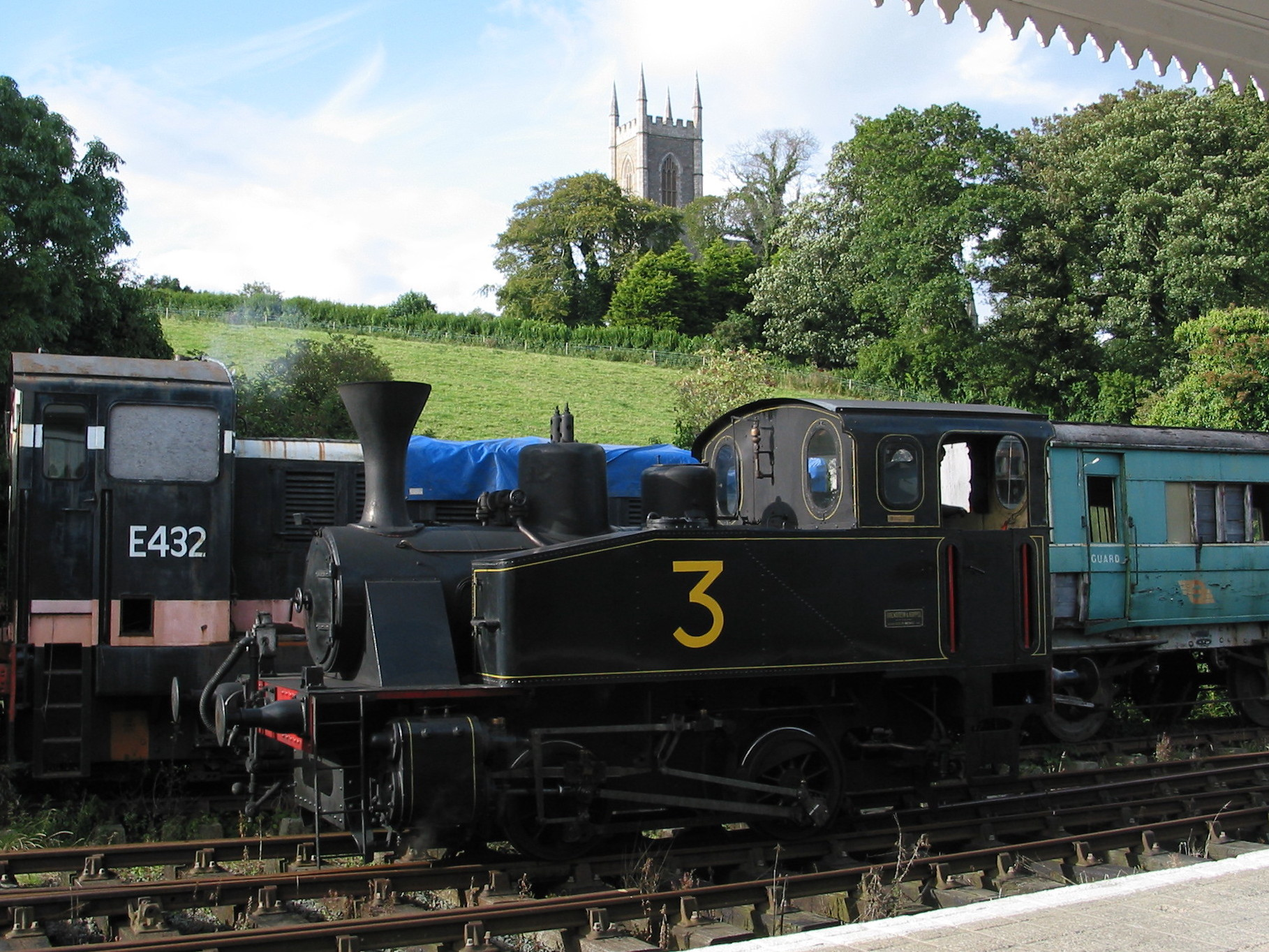
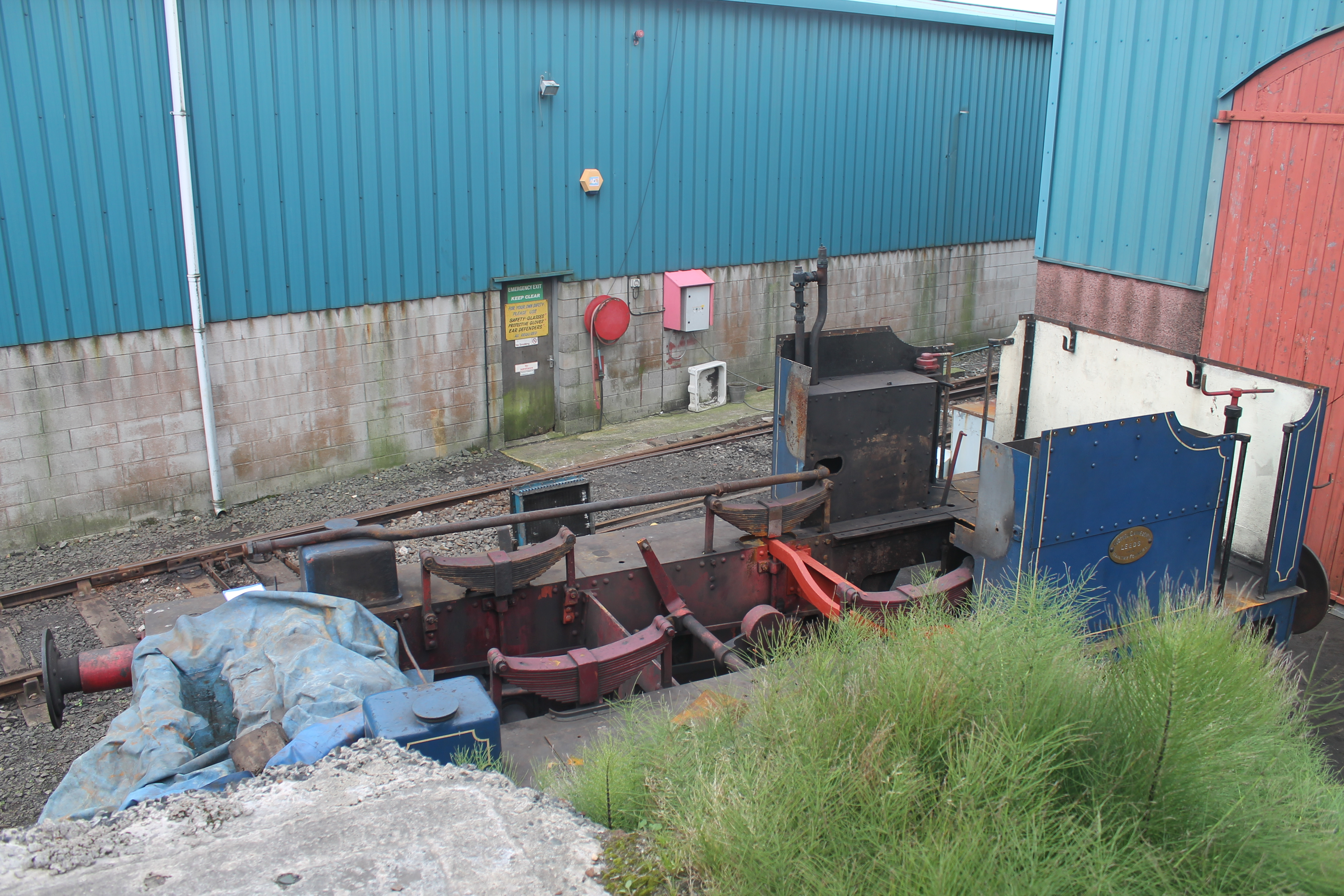
Image	Company	Number / Name	Class	Type	Manufacturer	Serial No.	Date	Notes
5 ft 3 in (1,600 mm)
	Belfast and County Down Railway	30	30	4-4-2T	Beyer, Peacock & Company	4231	1901	Static display, Ulster Folk and Transport Museums, Cultra, Belfast
	Northern Counties Committee (LMS)	74 Dunluce Castle	U2	4-4-0	North British Locomotive Company	23096	1924	Static display, Ulster Folk and Transport Museums, Cultra, Belfast
	Northern Counties Committee (LMS)	4	WT	2-6-4T	Derby Works	—	1947	Railway Preservation Society of Ireland, Whitehead, Co. Antrim
	Great Northern Railway	93 Sutton	JT	2-4-2T	Dundalk Works	—	1895	Static display, Ulster Folk and Transport Museums, Cultra, Belfast
	Great Northern Railway	131 Uranus	Q	4-4-0	Neilson, Reid & Company	5757	1901	Railway Preservation Society of Ireland, Whitehead, Co. Antrim
	Great Northern Railway	171 Slieve Gullion	S	4-4-0	Beyer, Peacock & Company	5629	1913	Railway Preservation Society of Ireland, Whitehead, Co. Antrim
	Great Northern Railway	85 Merlin	V	4-4-0	Beyer, Peacock & Company	6733	1932	Railway Preservation Society of Ireland, Whitehead, Co. Antrim (run by); Ulster Folk and Transport Museums, Cultra, Belfast (owned)
	Sligo, Leitrim and Northern Counties Railway	Lough Erne	Lough	0-6-4T	Beyer, Peacock & Company	7242	1949	Railway Preservation Society of Ireland, Whitehead, Co. Antrim
	Dublin and South Eastern Railway	15 → GSR 461	15–16	2-6-0	Beyer, Peacock & Company	6112	1922	Railway Preservation Society of Ireland, Whitehead, Co. Antrim
	Great Southern & Western Railway	36	21	2-2-2	Bury, Curtis and Kennedy	—	1847	Static display, Cork Kent railway station
	Great Southern & Western Railway	90	90	0-6-0T	Inchicore Works	—	1875	Downpatrick and County Down Railway
	Great Southern & Western Railway	184	101	0-6-0	Inchicore Works	—	1880	Railway Preservation Society of Ireland, Whitehead, Co. Antrim
	Great Southern & Western Railway	186	101	0-6-0	Sharp, Stewart & Company	2838	1879	Railway Preservation Society of Ireland, Whitehead, Co. Antrim
	Great Southern Railways	800; Maeḋḃ	800	4-6-0	Inchicore Works	—	1939	Static display, Ulster Folk and Transport Museums, Cultra, Belfast
	Londonderry Port and Harbour Commissioners	1	—	0-6-0ST	Robert Stephenson & Company	2738	1891	Static display, Ulster Folk and Transport Museums, Cultra, Belfast
	Londonderry Port and Harbour Commissioners	3 R.H. Smyth	—	0-6-0ST	Avonside Engine Company	2021	1928	Railway Preservation Society of Ireland, Whitehead, Co. Antrim
	Cómhlucht Siúicre Éireann	1	CSÉT Shunting Locomotives	0-4-0T	Orenstein & Koppel	12475	1934	Downpatrick and County Down Railway
	Cómhlucht Siúicre Éireann	3	CSÉT Shunting Locomotives	0-4-0T	Orenstein & Koppel	12662	1935	Downpatrick and County Down Railway
	Guinness Brewery	3	—	0-4-0ST	Hudswell Clarke	1152	1919	Railway Preservation Society of Ireland, Whitehead, Co. Antrim

=== Narrow Gauge ===
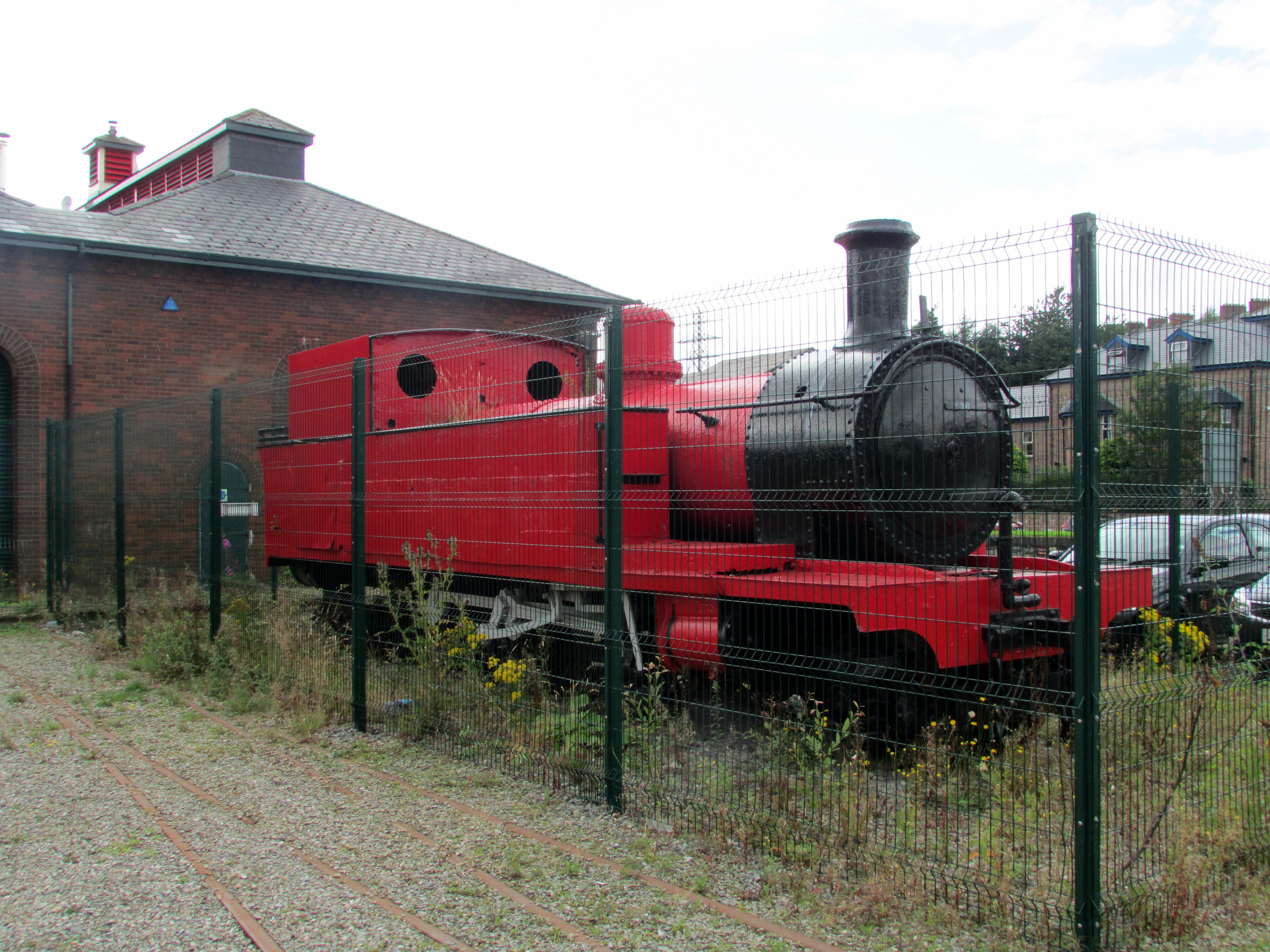
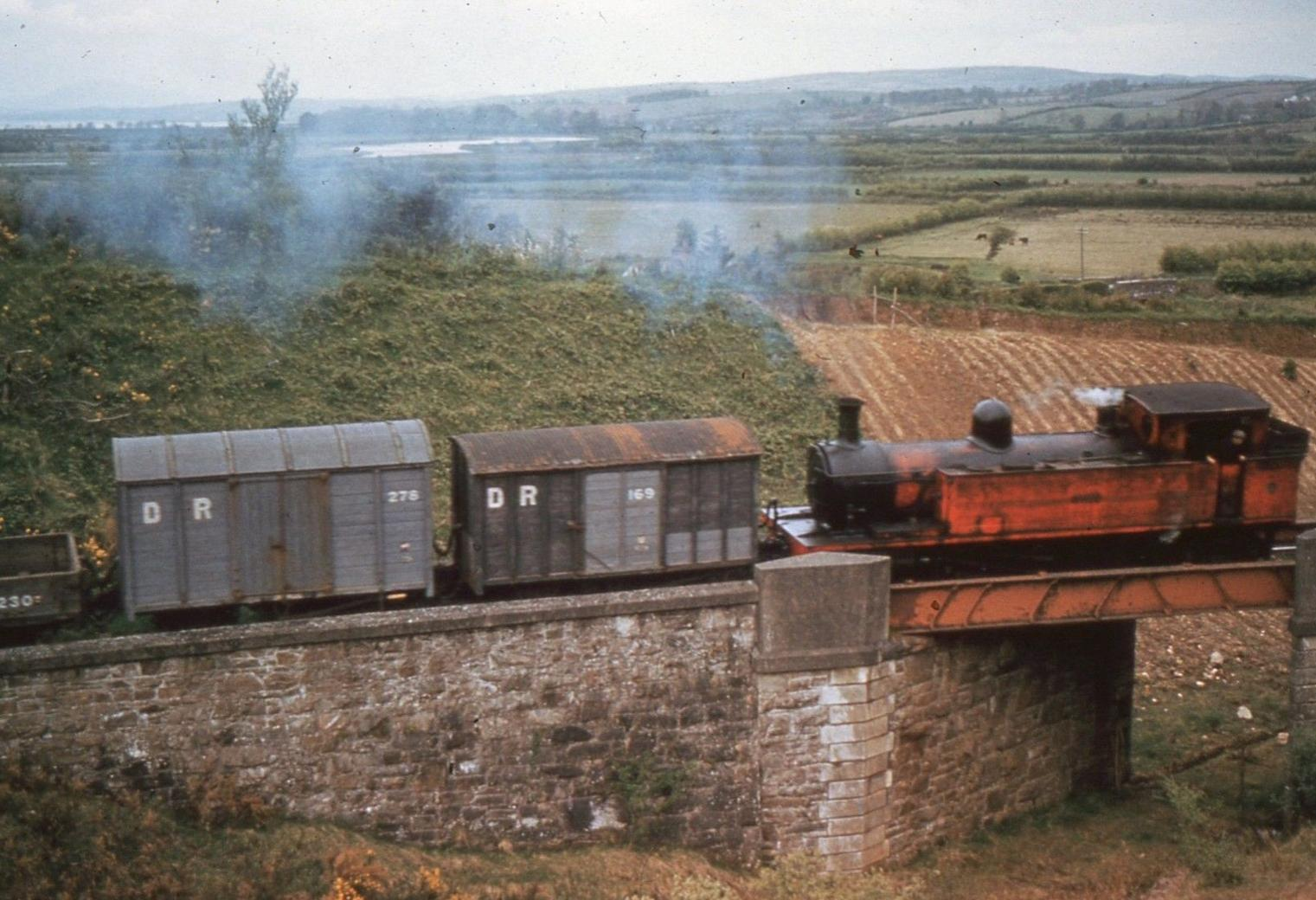
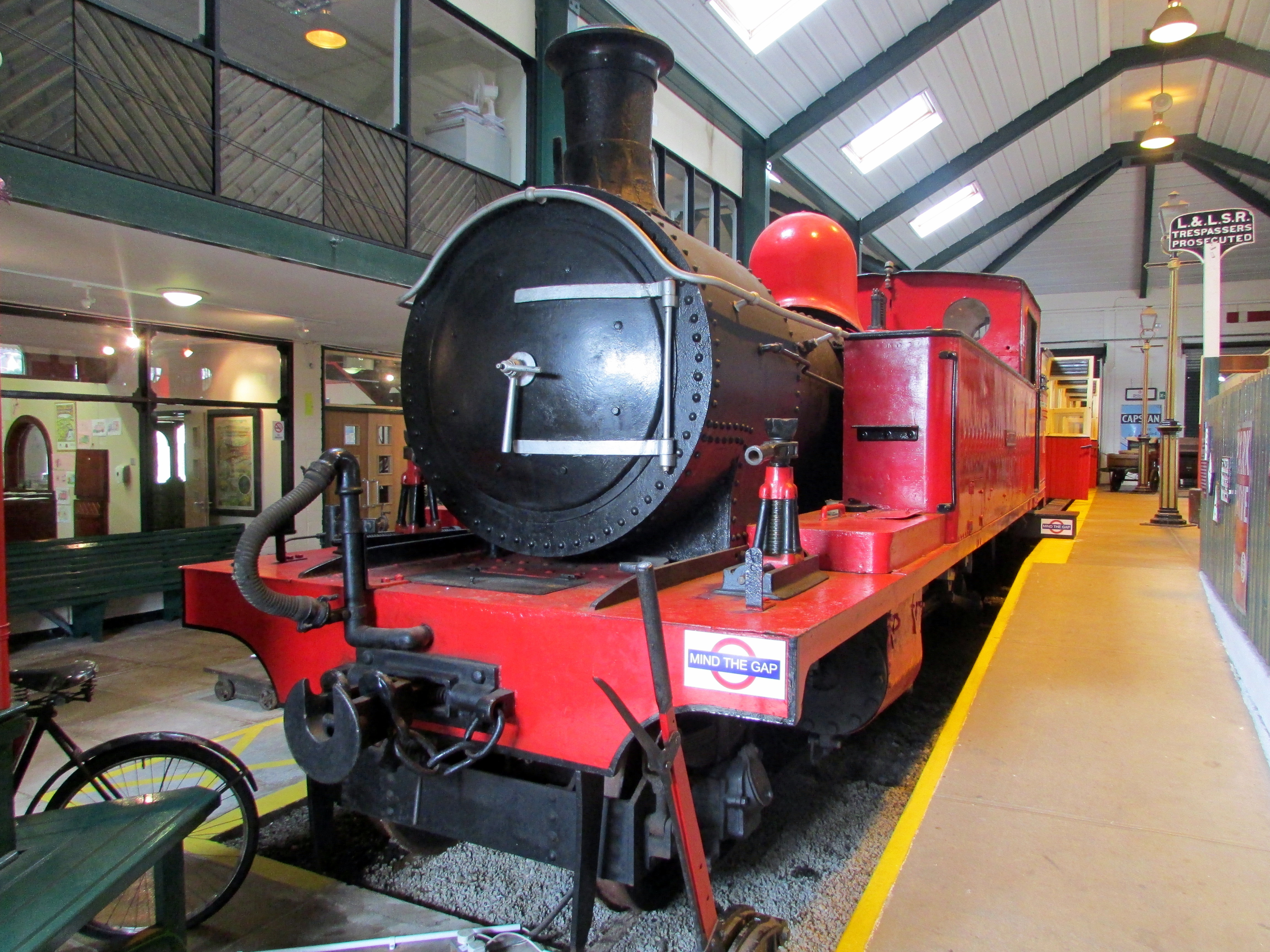
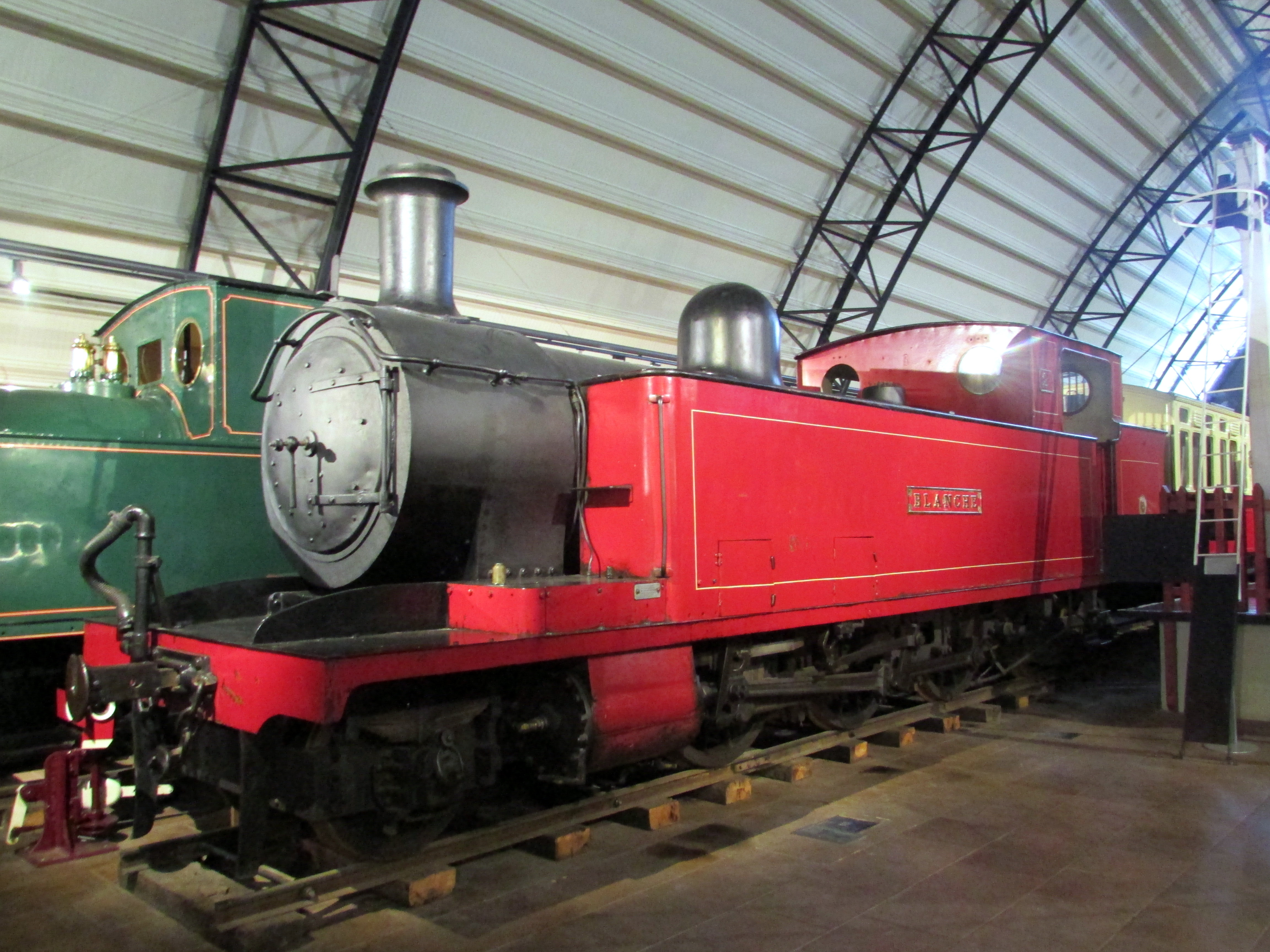
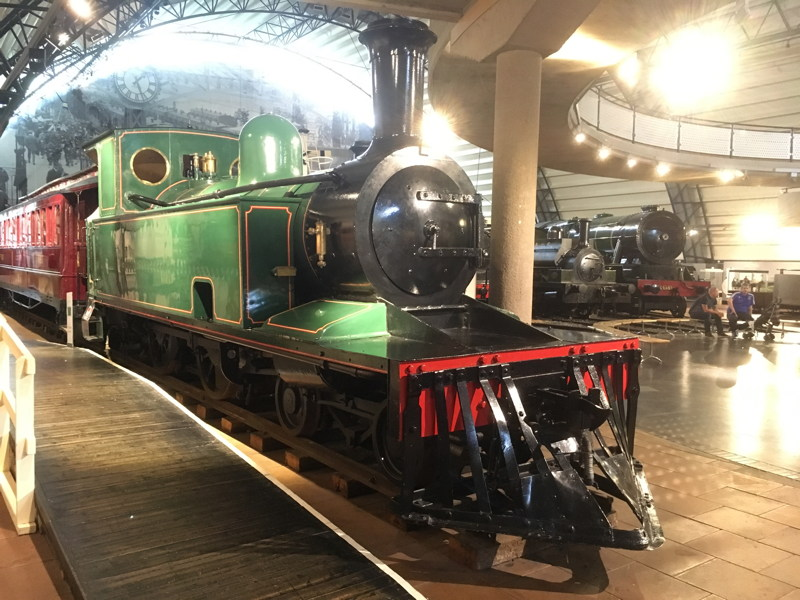
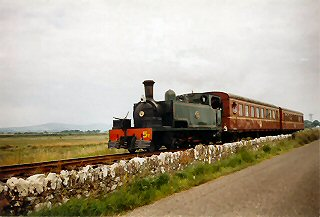
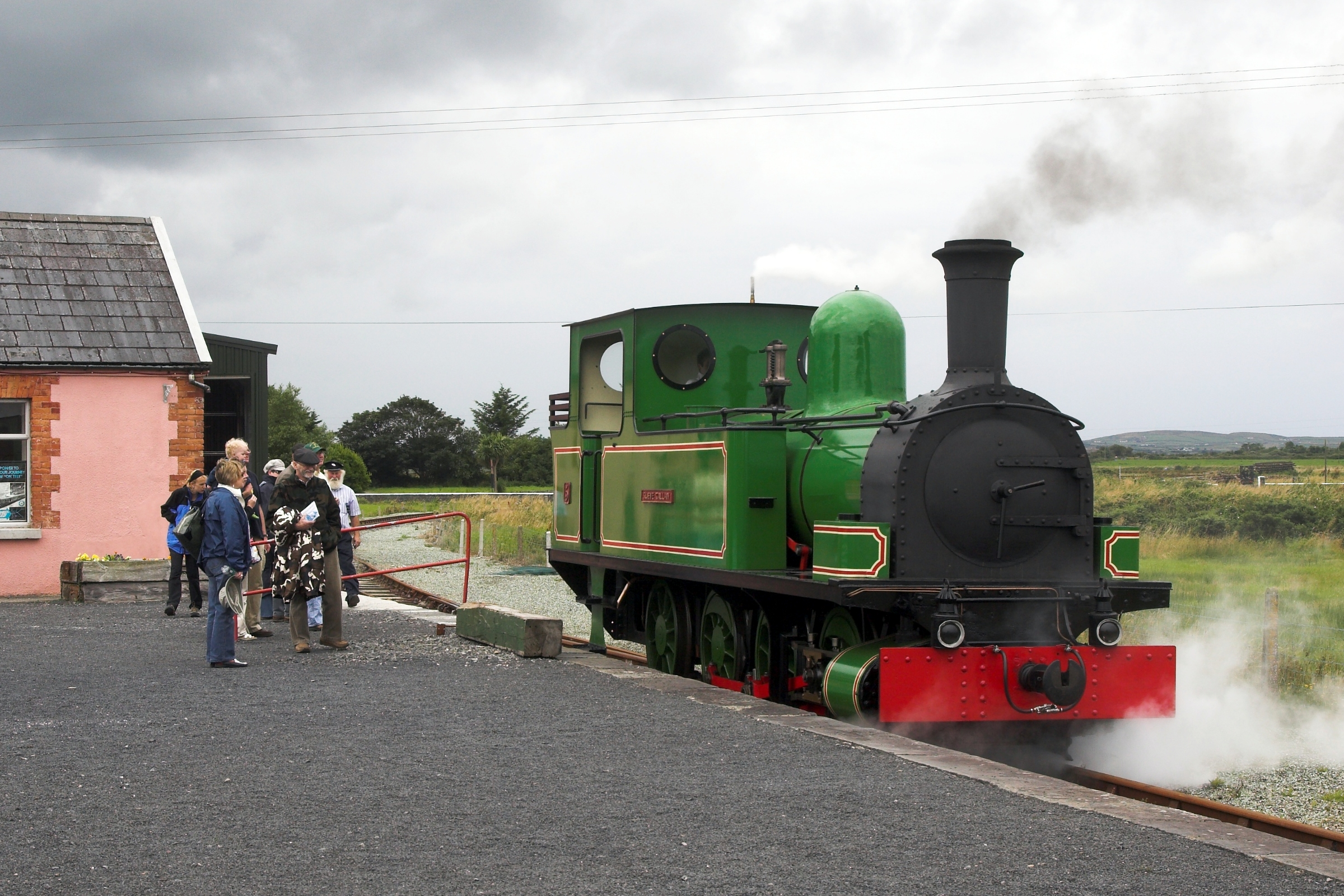
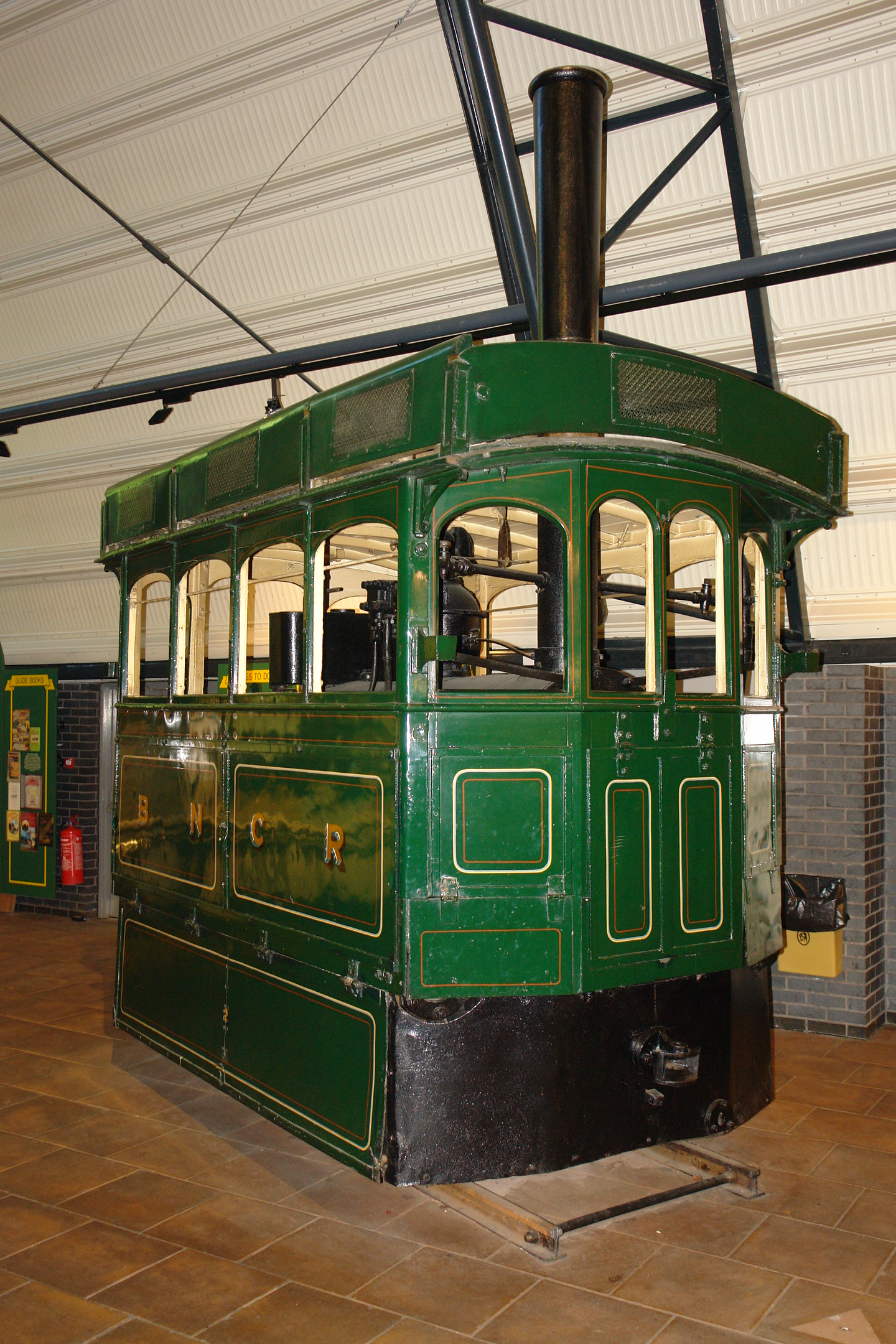
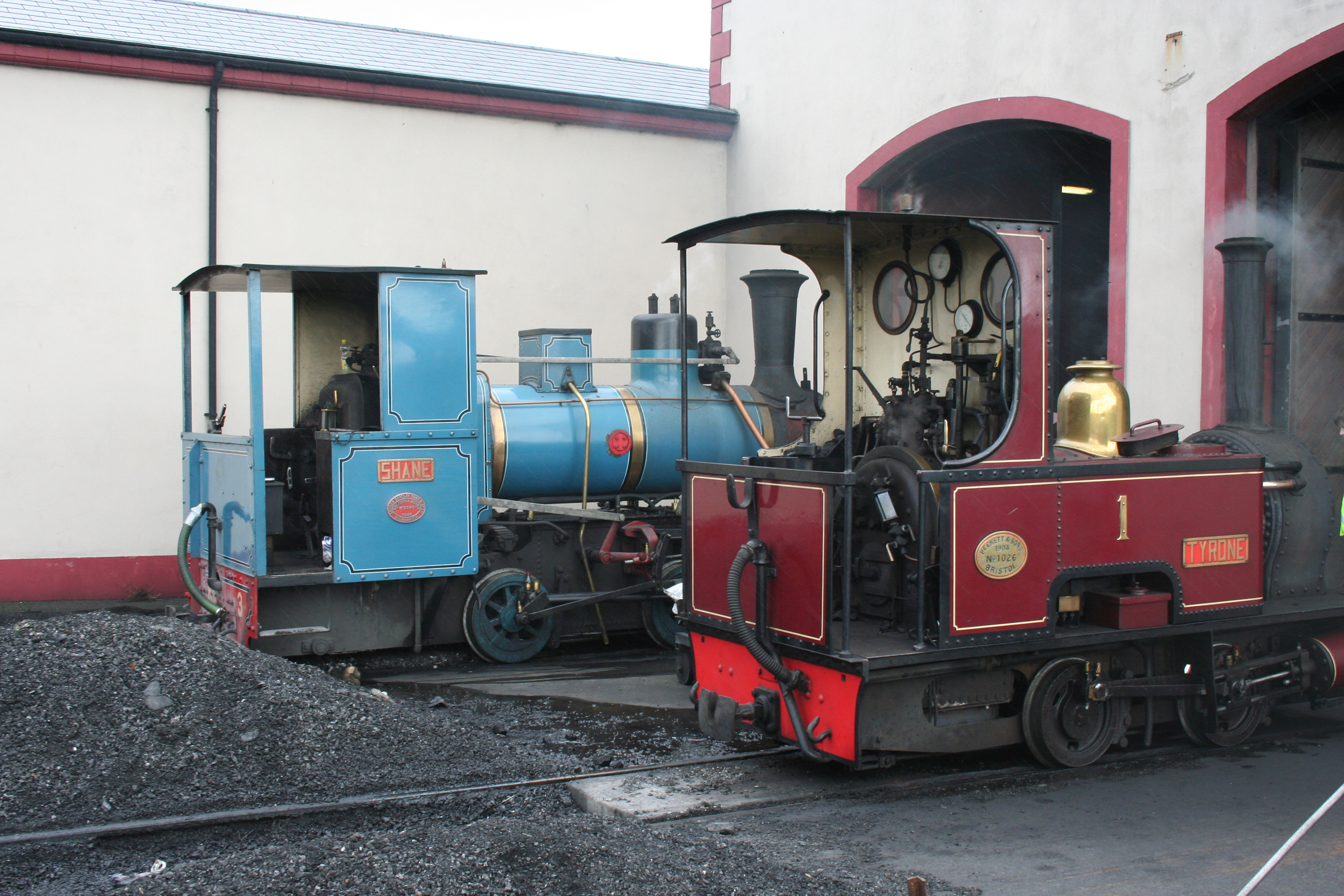
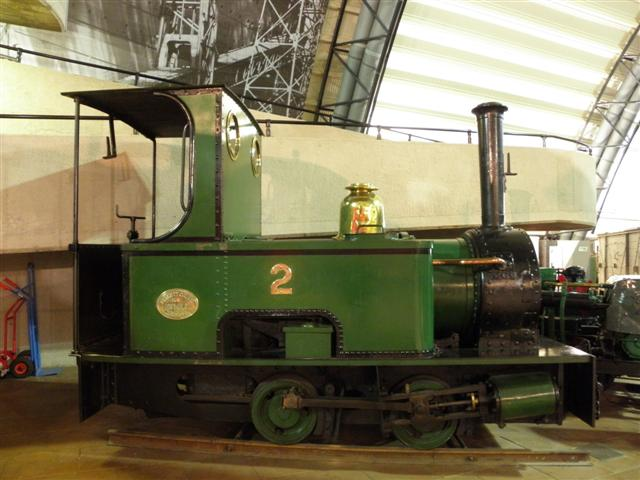
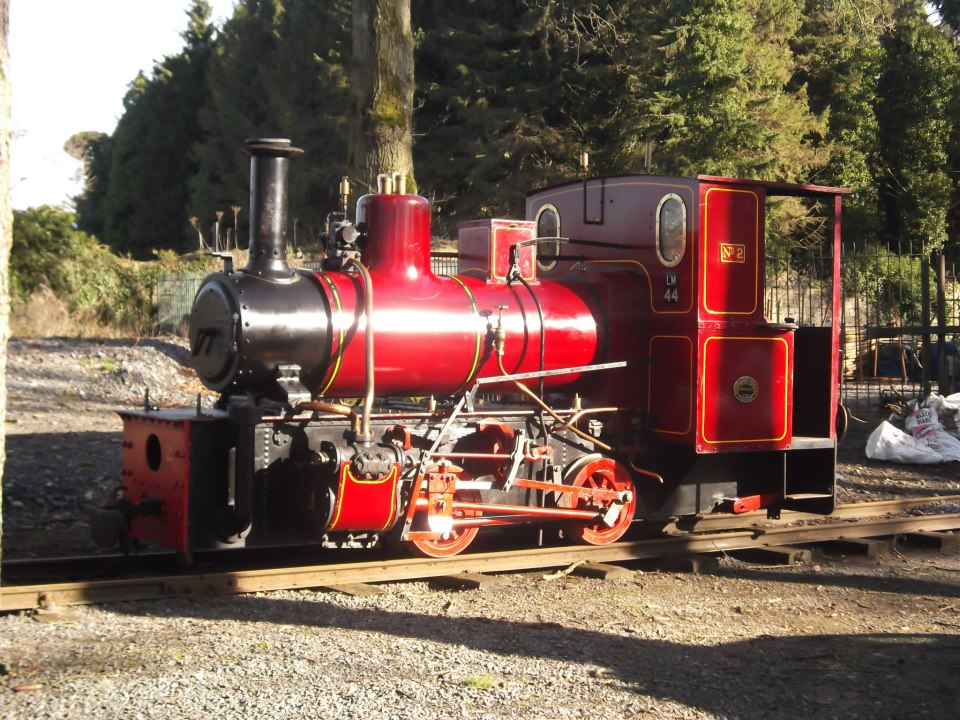
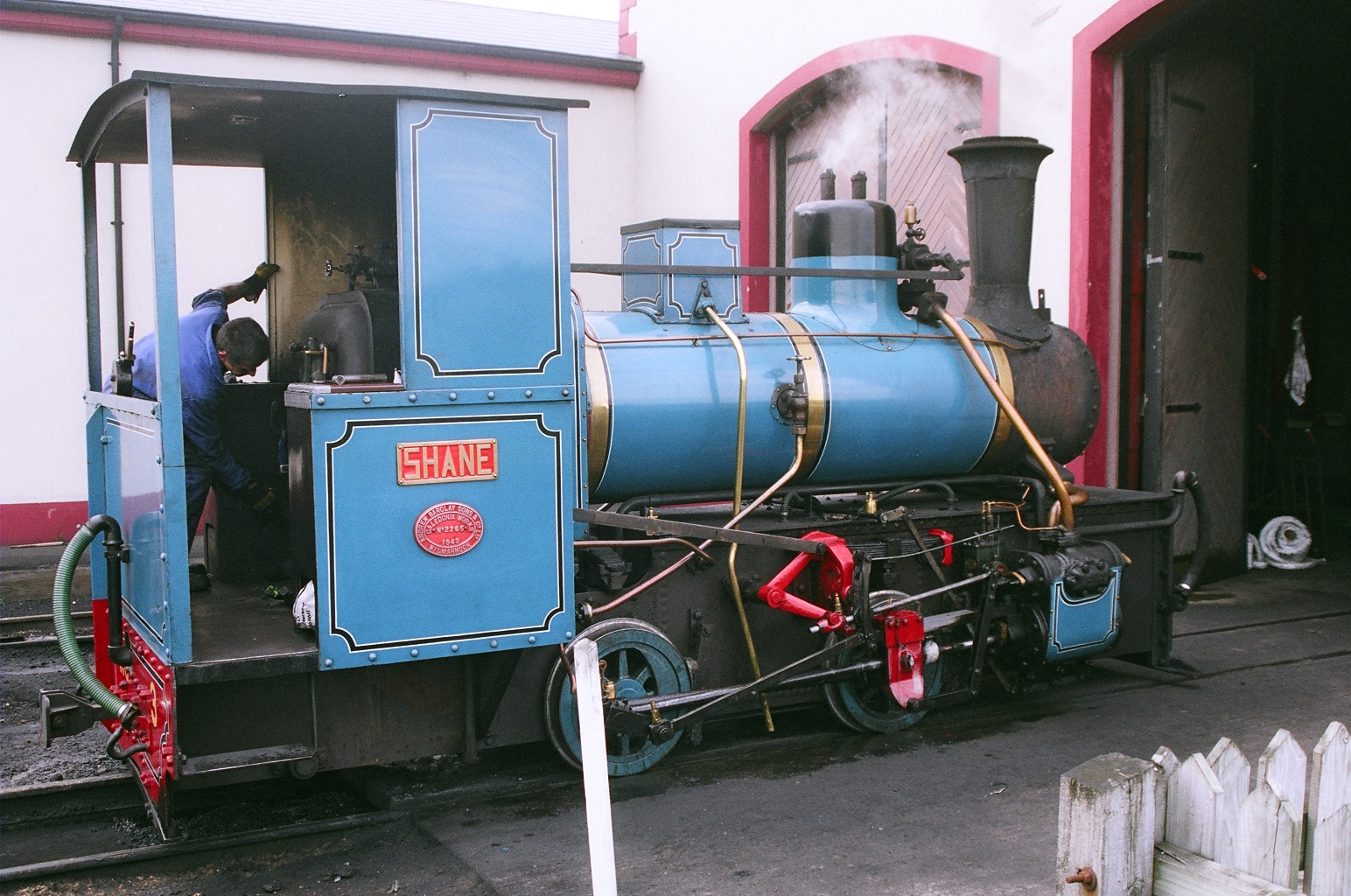
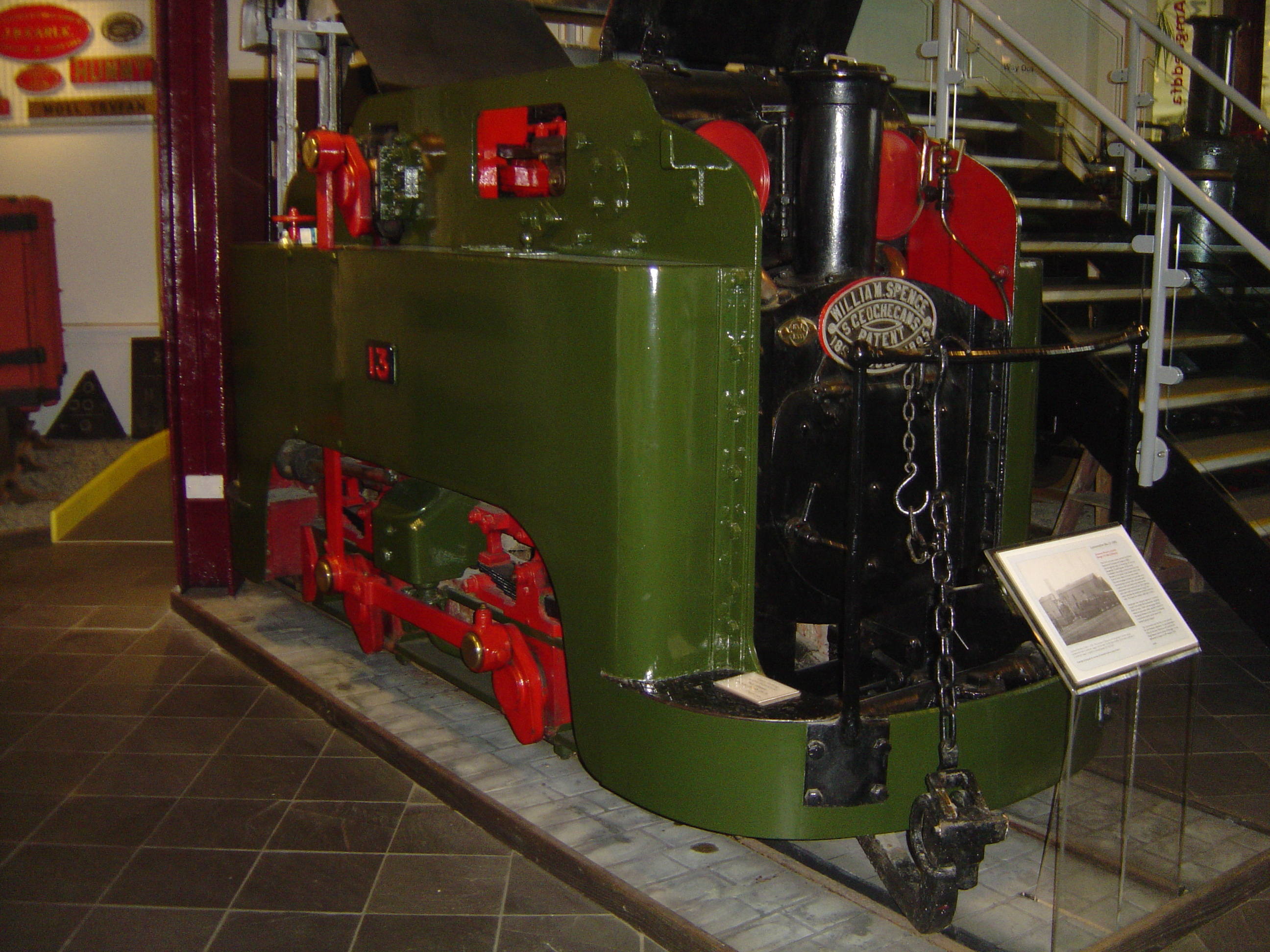
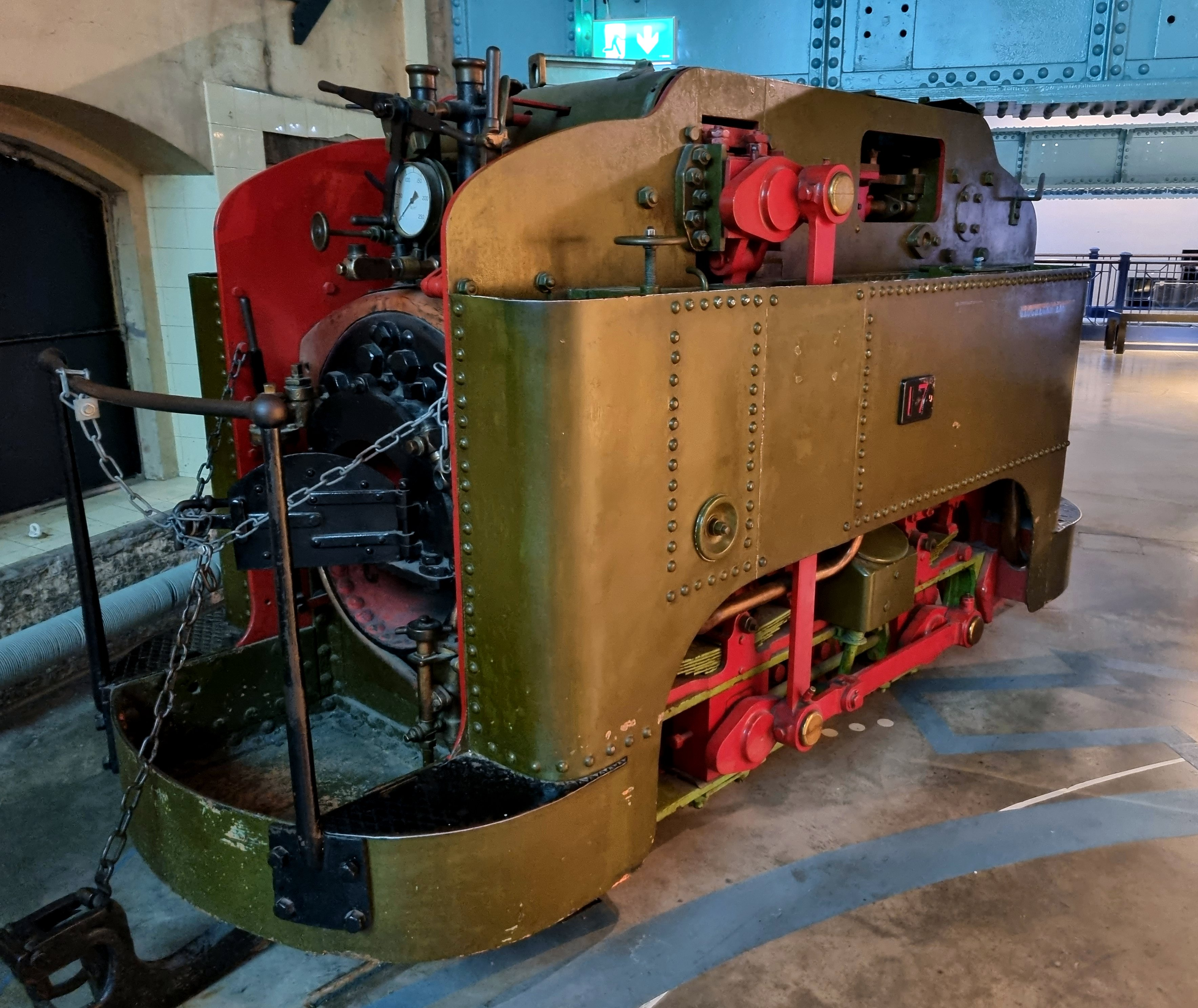
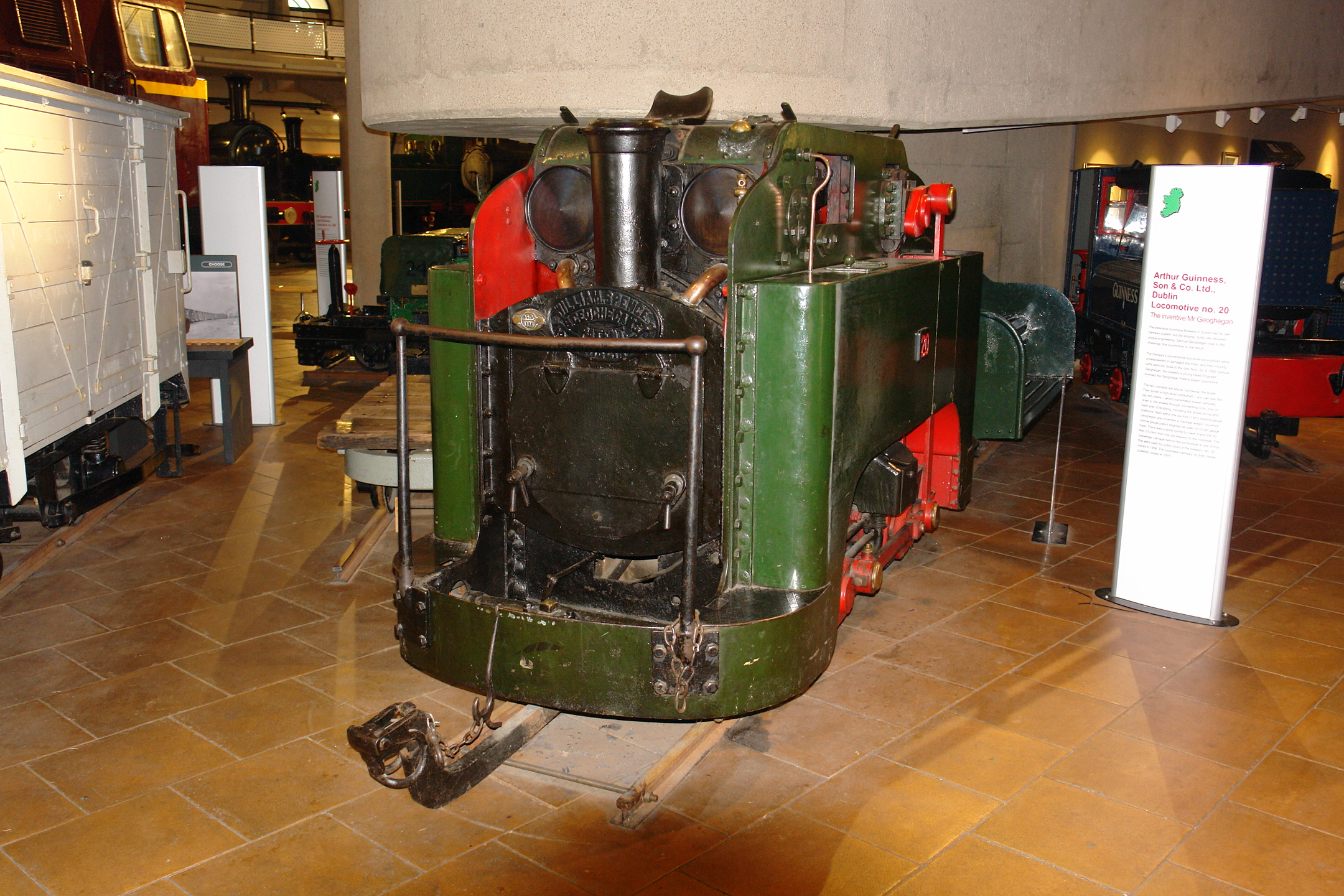
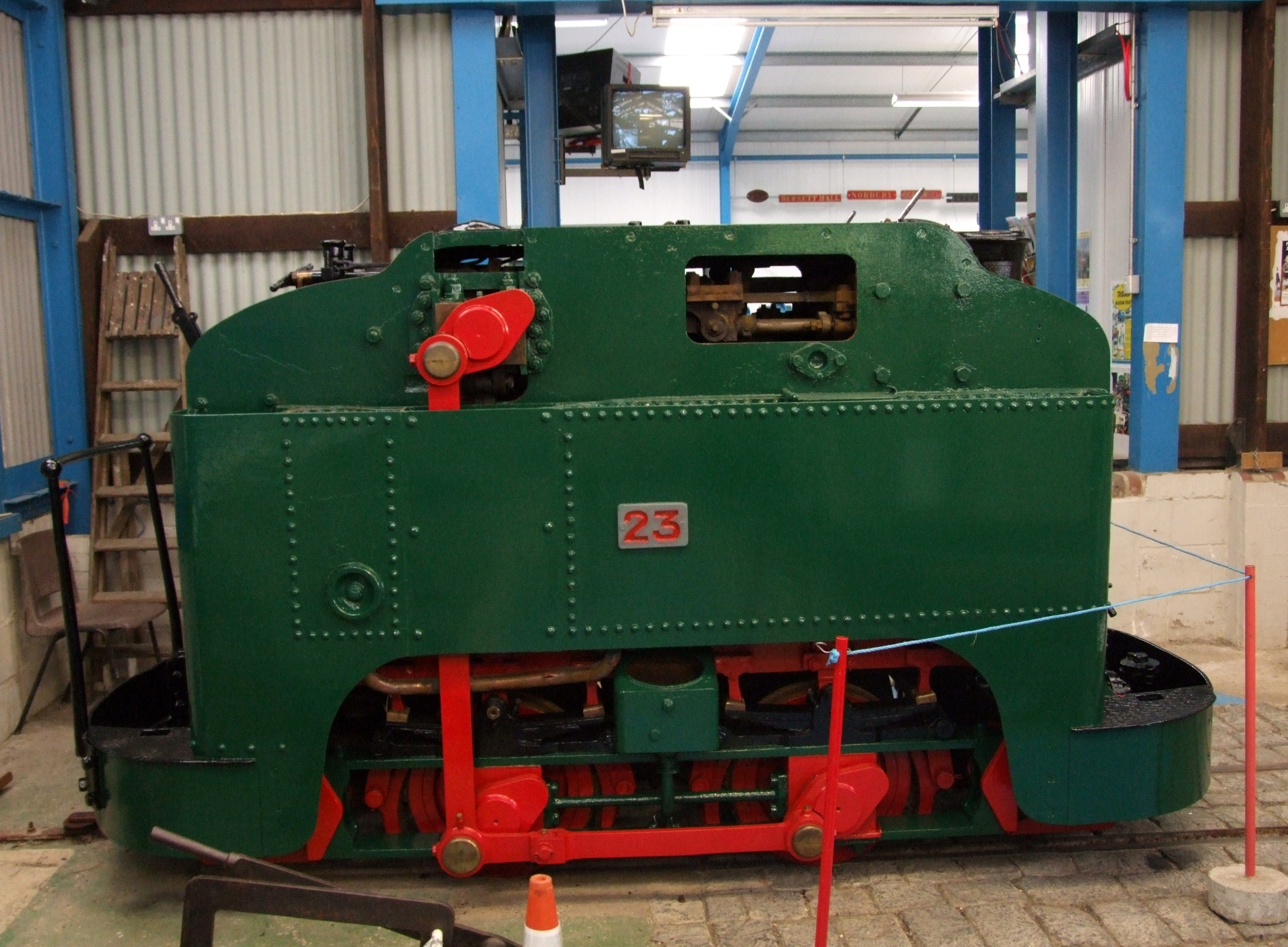
Image	Company	Number / Name	Class	Type	Manufacturer	Serial No.	Date	Notes
3 ft (914 mm) gauge
	County Donegal Railways Joint Committee	16 Donegal → 4 Meenglas	5	2-6-4T	Nasmyth, Wilson & Company	828	1907	Foyle Valley Railway Museum
	County Donegal Railways Joint Committee	17 Glenties → 5 Drumboe	5	2-6-4T	Nasmyth, Wilson & Company	829	1907	Donegal Railway Heritage Centre
	County Donegal Railways Joint Committee	18 Killybegs → 6 Columbkille	5	2-6-4T	Nasmyth, Wilson & Company	830	1907	Foyle Valley Railway Museum
	County Donegal Railways Joint Committee	2A Strabane → 2 Blanche	5A	2-6-4T	Nasmyth, Wilson & Company	956	1912	Static display, Ulster Folk and Transport Museums, Cultra, Belfast
	Cavan and Leitrim Railway	2 Kathleen	1–8	4-4-0T	Robert Stephenson & Company	2613	1887	Static display, Ulster Folk and Transport Museums, Cultra, Belfast
	Cavan and Leitrim Railway	3 Lady Edith	1–8	4-4-0T	Robert Stephenson & Company	2614	1887	New Jersey Museum of Transportation in process of returning to Ireland.
	Tralee and Dingle Light Railway	5	5	2-6-2T	Hunslet Engine Company	555	1892	Tralee and Dingle Light Railway
	West Clare Railway	5 Slieve Callan	5–7	0-6-2T	Dübs & Company	2890	1892	West Clare Railway
	Portstewart Tramway	1	1–2	0-4-0T	Kitson & Company	T56	1882	Preserved at the Streetlife Museum of Transport in Hull.
	Portstewart Tramway	2	1–2	0-4-0T	Kitson & Company	T84	1883	Static display, Ulster Folk and Transport Museums, Cultra, Belfast.
	British Aluminium	1 Tyrone		0-4-0T	Peckett & Sons	1026	1904	Giant's Causeway and Bushmills Railway
	British Aluminium	2		0-4-0T	Peckett & Sons	1097	1906	Static display, Ulster Folk and Transport Museums, Cultra, Belfast
	Bord na Móna	2 → LM44	1–3	0-4-0WT	Andrew Barclay Sons & Company	2264	1949	Stradbally Woodland Railway
	Bord na Móna	3 Shane → LM45	1–3	0-4-0WT	Andrew Barclay Sons & Company	2265	1949	Giant's Causeway and Bushmills Railway
1 ft 10 in (559 mm) gauge
	Guinness Brewery	13		0-4-0T	William Spence and Son	—	1895	Static display, Narrow Gauge Railway Museum, Tywyn, Wales
	Guinness Brewery	15		0-4-0T	William Spence and Son	—	1895	Stradbally Woodland Railway
	Guinness Brewery	17		0-4-0T	William Spence and Son	—	1902	Guinness Brewery, Dublin.
	Guinness Brewery	20		0-4-0T	William Spence and Son	—	1905	Static display, Ulster Folk and Transport Museums, Cultra, Belfast
	Guinness Brewery	22		0-4-0T	William Spence and Son	—	1912	Cavan and Leitrim Railway
	Guinness Brewery	23		0-4-0T	William Spence and Son	—	1921	Static display, Amberley Museum & Heritage Centre, Amberley, West Sussex.

In addition to the 19 preserved Irish standard gauge locomotives, a NCC Class W new build project is currently in the works.
