= TDLR 5 =

Preserved Irish steam locomotive

Tralee and Dingle Light Railway 5
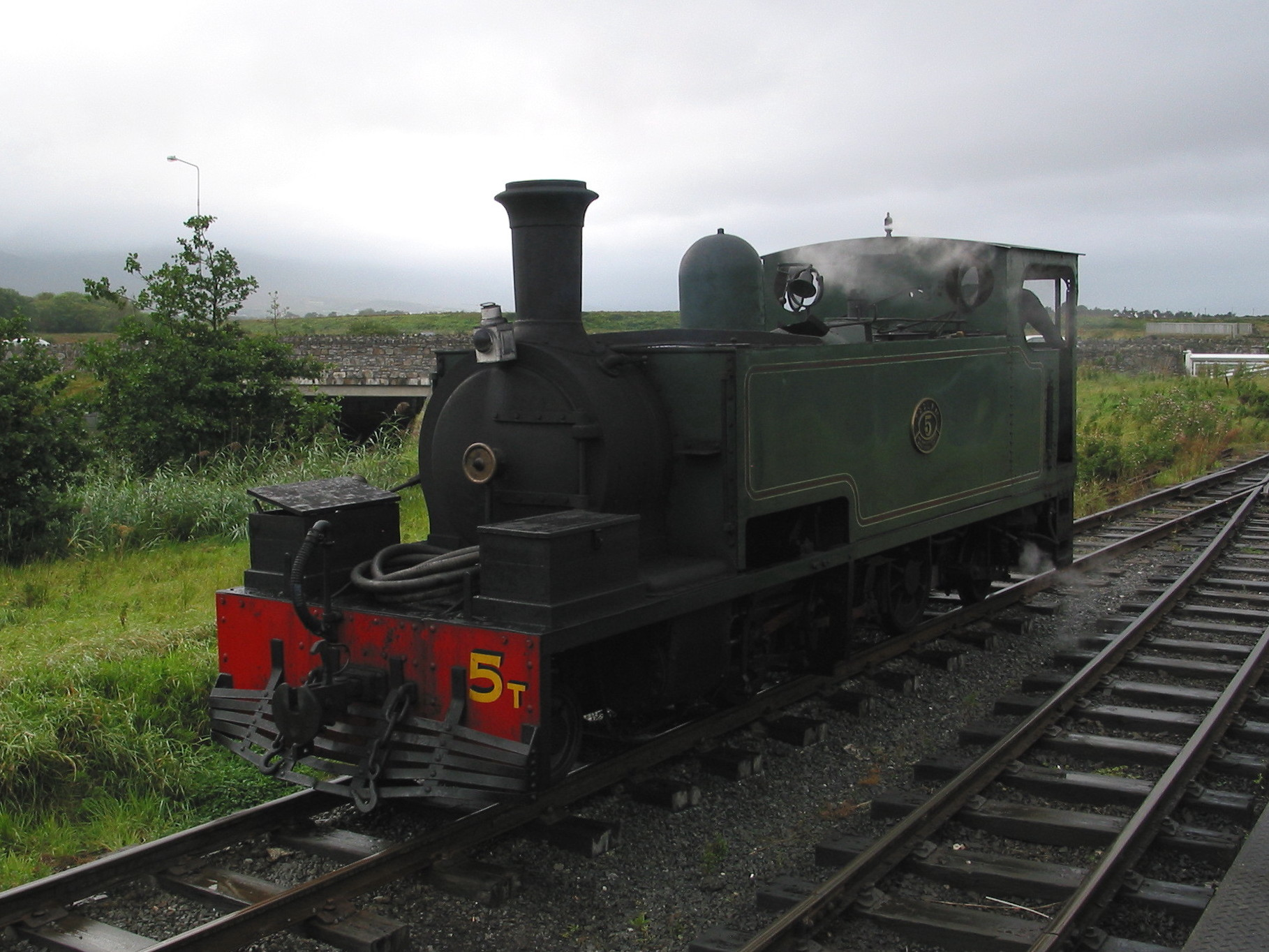
- No 5 in Tralee in 2004
Type and origin
- Power type: Steam
- Builder: Hunslet Engine Company
- Serial number: 555
- Build date: 1892
Specifications
- Configuration
  - Whyte: 2-6-2T
  - UIC: 1′C1′ n2t
- Gauge: 3 ft (914 mm)
- Leading dia.: 2 ft 0 in (0.610 m)
- Driver dia.: 3 ft 0 in (0.914 m)
- Trailing dia.: 2 ft 0 in (0.610 m)
- Loco weight: 39 long tons 0 cwt (87,400 lb or 39.6 t)
- Fuel type: Coal
- Fuel capacity: 0 long tons 17 cwt (1,900 lb or 0.9 t)
- Water cap.: 750 imperial gallons (3,400 L; 900 US gal)
- Firebox
  - Grate area: 10.7 sq ft (0.99 m^{2})
- Boiler pressure: 150 lbf/in^{2} (1.03 MPa)
- Heating surface
  - Firebox: 70 sq ft (6.5 m^{2})
  - Tubes: 531 sq ft (49.3 m^{2})
- Cylinders: Two, outside
- Cylinder size: 13.5 in × 18 in (343 mm × 457 mm)
Performance figures
- Tractive effort: 11,460 lbf (50.98 kN)
Career
- Operators: TDLR » GSR » CIÉ
- Class: GSR/CIÉ: 5T or PN2
- Numbers: 5
- Withdrawn: 1959

Tralee and Dingle Light Railway 5 is a 2-6-2T locomotive manufactured by the Hunslet Engine Company in 1892 for the Tralee and Dingle Light Railway.

It is difficult to understand why the Tralee and Dingle acquired this particular locomotive. Perhaps they were looking for a locomotive more suited to passenger work, the pony truck should give a better ride for the crews over lightly laid track, perhaps the extra truck was needed to keep the axle-weight down as No. 5 was some 9 tons heavier than the other, earlier Hunslets or, as it was fitted for oil-burning from new it could be that Hunslets, in looking for a narrow gauge railway on which to demonstrate their product, gave a good deal on the price, and railways were always looking for a good deal to help their finances. Regardless of which No. 5 arrived in 1892 and on the 1925 amalgamation became the sole representative of GSR Class 5T or Class PN2.

== History ==
Tralee and Dingle locomotive No. 5 was delivered from its builders, The Hunslet Engine Company, of Leeds as their works number 555 in 1892, ready fitted for oil-burning. It is believed that this was a prototype and Hunslet were looking for a railway to demonstrate its product, one of the first for narrow gauge. The T&D also purchased two oil-burning units for fitting to its other locomotives but they were never used. No.5 was converted to burn coal after only a short career as an oil-burner.

Like the earlier Hunslet products No. 5 was delivered ready for “tramway” operation, fitted with “skirts” to cover the motion, a boiler mounted bell and headlights. As with the other locomotives the “skirts” had a short life and were removed to facilitate easy access to the motion oiling points etc.

A new boiler was fitted in 1906 and, being a favourite of the engine crews, it saw many miles under its belt before being stopped in 1948 and taken to Inchicore Works. It was outshopped in 1949 and, with no work on its home line, sent to the Cavan and Leitrim Railway where it served until final withdrawal from service in 1959. It was always said that this locomotive covered the most miles of all the T&D fleet it was so well liked by the crews, however this was put beyond doubt when it crossed the Atlantic in 1959 to return in 1988 to run again on its home metals.

== Livery ==
Tralee and Dingle locomotive livery was a dark green outlined with red between two cream lines, with red buffer beams. Following the 1925 amalgamation the livery became that of the GSR, with locomotives painted plain grey with red buffer beams. It carried this livery, in common with other TDLR locos, on into CIÉ days and retained it until withdrawal.

== Preservation ==
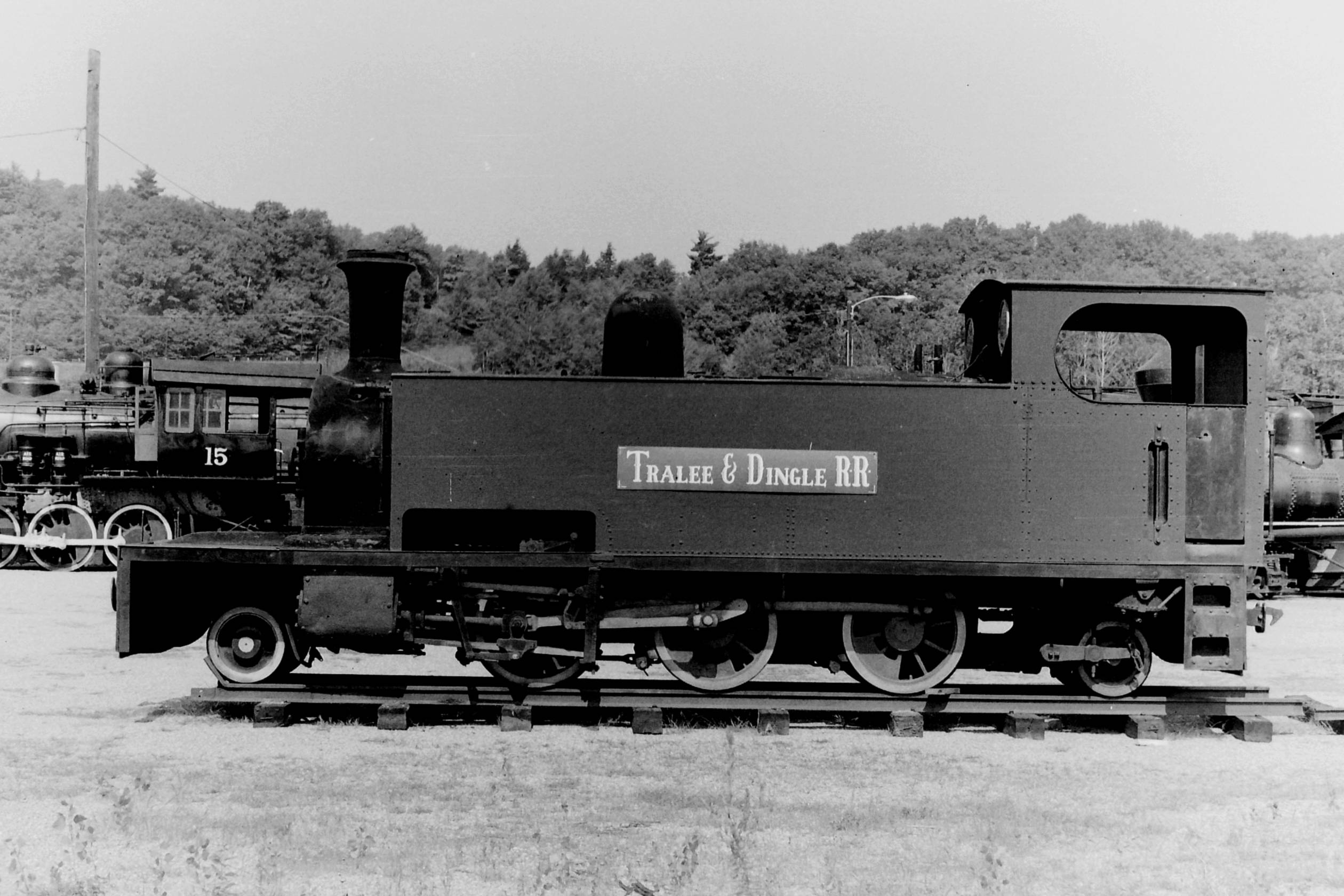
No. 5 at Steamtown, U.S.A. in Bellows Falls, Vermont, USA in August 1970.

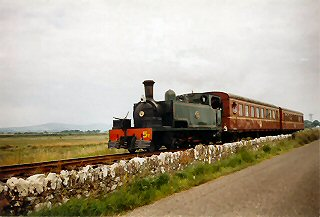
Restored No 5T running along the roadside near Blennerville in 1999.

Locomotive No.5 was withdrawn from service in 1959 and bought by American millionaire F. Nelson Blount and was sent to the Steamtown Museum in Bellows Falls, Vermont, where it was cosmetically restored to TDLR condition and placed on static display. In 1988, No. 5 returned to Tralee where, after 5 years, it was restored to working order for duties on the 1½ miles reopened section of the TDLR between Tralee and Blennerville.

The locomotive is out of service after failing a boiler certificate and the whole project has ground to a halt as a result. With the line closed again, a decision on its future depends on funding. 5 now lies dismantled in its shed.
