= GNRI Class Q =

Great Northern Railway of Ireland 4-4-0 passenger steam locomotive class introduced 1899

GNR(I) Q class
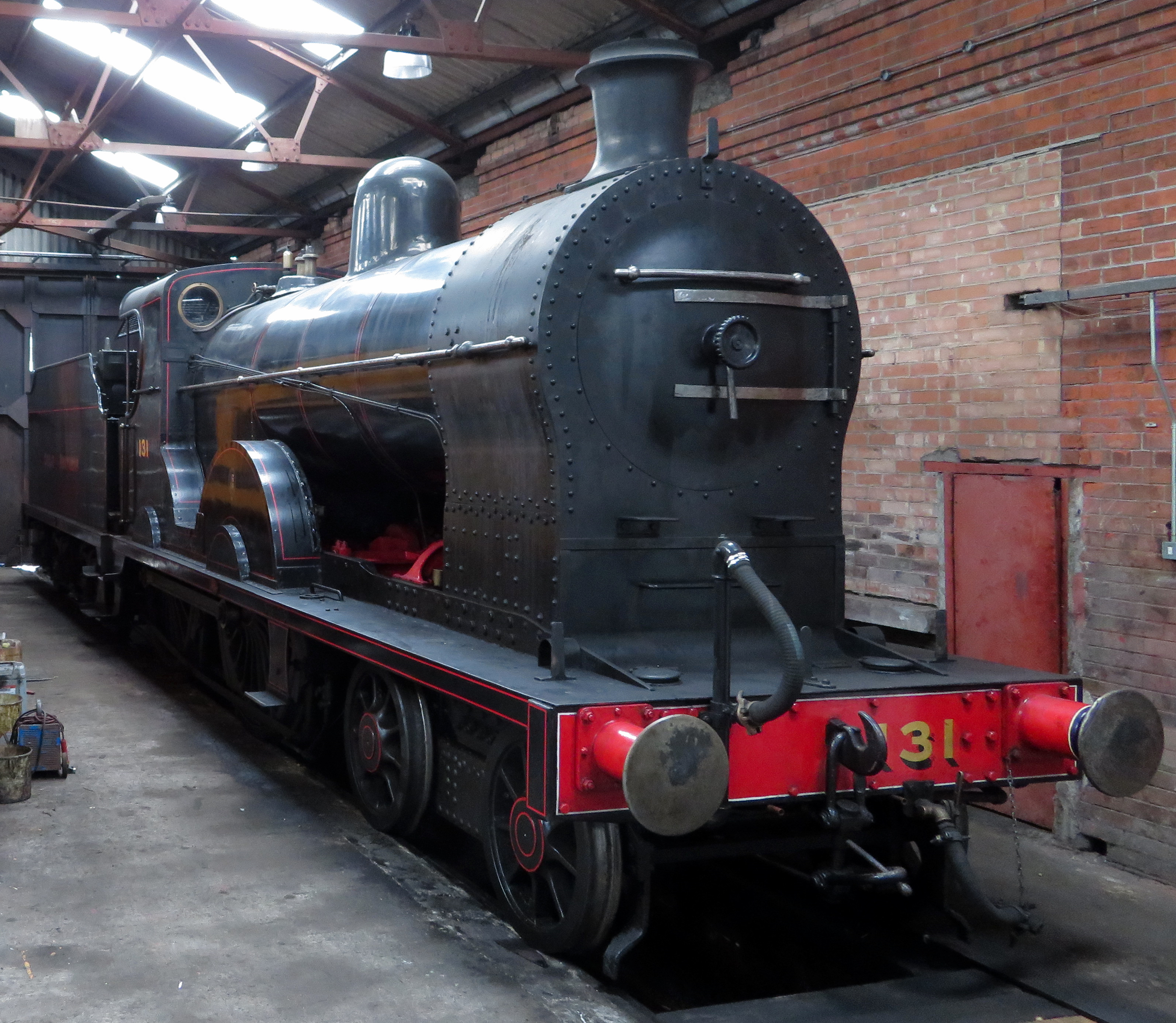
- GNR(I) No. 131 in the shed at Whitehead, 2019
Type and origin
- Power type: Steam
- Designer: Charles Clifford
- Builder: Neilson, Reid & Company (9), North British Locomotive Company (2), Beyer, Peacock & Company (2)
- Build date: 1899–1904
- Total produced: 13
Specifications
- Configuration
  - Whyte: 4-4-0
  - UIC: 2′B n2 (later 2′B h2)
- Gauge: 5 ft 3 in (1,600 mm)
- Driver dia.: 6 ft 7 in (2.007 m)
- Loco weight: 49 long tons 4 cwt (110,200 lb or 50 t)
- Boiler: 4 ft 6 in (1.37 m) diameter
- Boiler pressure: 175 psi (1.21 MPa)
- Cylinders: Two, inside
- Cylinder size: 18 in × 26 in (457 mm × 660 mm) later 18.5 in × 26 in (470 mm × 660 mm)
Performance figures
- Tractive effort: 16,755 lbf (74.53 kN)
Career
- Operators: GNR(I) → UTA & CIÉ
- Numbers: 120-125, 130-136
- Preserved: No.131
- Disposition: 1 preserved, 12 scrapped

The GNR(I) Q Class 4-4-0 steam locomotives of the Great Northern Railway (Ireland) (GNR) were mainly used on cross-border mixed traffic duties between Dublin and Belfast, as well as the "Derry Road" between Portadown and Derry. It was designed for the GNR under the auspices of Charles Clifford and built by Neilson, Reid & Company, North British Locomotive Company and Beyer, Peacock & Company. The Q Class is slightly smaller than the GNR class S 4-4-0 but powerful enough to haul a rake of eight or more carriages.

Faster running was achieved with the addition of superheated boilers and widened cylinders (under the supervision of G.T. Glover in the 1920s, and sometimes known as Qs class). In 1932 a two coach newspaper train hauled by No. 135 covered Howth Junction to Drogheda at a start-to-stop average speed of 67.06 mph (107.92 km/h), the fastest run in Ireland achieved with a steam locomotive on a scheduled train

== Preservation ==
One member of the Q Class, Number 131, has been restored by the Railway Preservation Society of Ireland. It was used mainly on northern routes, the former Ulster Railway main line between Belfast and Clones and the "Derry Road" between Belfast and Derry via Portadown. While in service it was in standard GNR black livery. It worked on Córas Iompair Éireann lines from 1958 and was withdrawn in October 1963.

In the late 1970s the locomotive was repainted and placed on a plinth at Dundalk Clarke station. In June 1984 No. 131 and its tender were moved to Mallow, County Cork as the main locomotive of the Great Southern Railway Preservation Society. However, this venture was unfulfilled and the locomotive (partially stripped down and with the boiler and firebox out of the frames) was moved to Inchicore Railway Works in the late 1990s while the running frames were moved to Whitehead, County Antrim in May 2003. The Railway Preservation Society of Ireland bought the locomotive from CIÉ in April 2005.

In November 2013, funding under the Generating Opportunities Within (GROW) South Antrim scheme was allocated, permitting (together with completion of No.171 Slieve Gullion's protracted overhaul) the full restoration of No.131. On 22 February 2015, 131 ran from Whitehead to Carrickfergus and back on a trial. This was the locomotive's first run on the mainline in over 50 years. On 5 November 2017, 131 performed three mainline daytime tests to Carrickfergus and Belfast Lanyon Place (Previously Belfast Central). The locomotive returned to mainline service in April 2018, in 1920s black with red lining livery, hauling tender No.37 which has been rebuilt with a new body. The locomotive's first mainline passenger service since 1963, was a charter to celebrate Northern Ireland Railway's 50th anniversary, where it took a train of Mk2 coaches to Great Victoria Street station. The locomotive later in the year ran one leg of the RPSI's May tour, running from Whitehead to Belfast, then to Lisburn and up the Antrim Branch to Antrim on 15 May 2018. 131 is now based at Whitehead and operates trains originating in Northern Ireland, although it is now passed to operate trains anywhere on the Irish railway systems.

== Table of locomotives ==
Manufacturer	Serial No.	Date	GNRI No.	Name	1958 Owner	1958 No.	Withdrawn	Notes
Neilson, Reid & Company	5557	1899	133	Apollo	—	—	1957	
Neilson, Reid & Company	5558	1899	134	Adonis	—	—	1951	
Neilson, Reid & Company	5559	1899	135	Cyclops	UTA	135X	1963	
Neilson, Reid & Company	5560	1899	136	Minerva	CIÉ	—	1959	
Neilson, Reid & Company	5756	1901	130	Saturn	CIÉ	—	1959	
Neilson, Reid & Company	5757	1901	131	Uranus	CIÉ	131N	1963	Preserved
Neilson, Reid & Company	5758	1901	132	Mercury	CIÉ	132N	1963	
Neilson, Reid & Company	6156	1902	124	Cerberus	—	—	1957	
Neilson, Reid & Company	6157	1902	125	Daphne	UTA	125X	1958	
North British Locomotive Company	15766	1903	122	Vulcan	UTA	122X	1960	
North British Locomotive Company	15767	1903	123	Lucifer	CIÉ	—	1959	
Beyer, Peacock & Company	4565	1904	120	Venus	—	—	1957	
Beyer, Peacock & Company	4566	1904	121	Pluto	UTA	121X	1958	
