= Steam locomotives of Ireland =

List of steam locomotives used on Ireland's railways

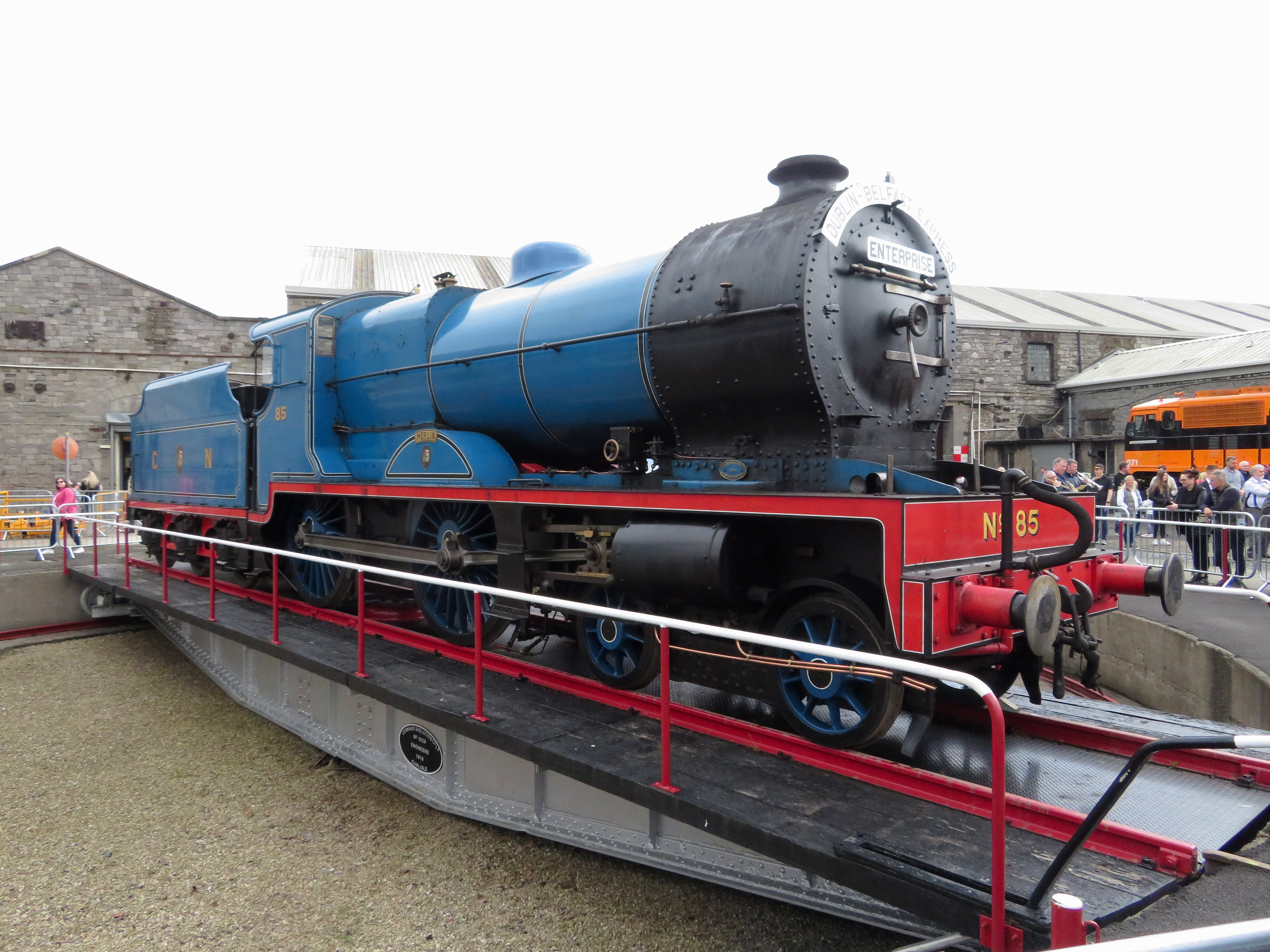
Merlin at Inchicore Works

A wide variety of steam locomotives have been used on Ireland's railways. This page lists most if not all those that have been used in the Republic of Ireland and Northern Ireland. Irish railways generally followed British practice in locomotive design.

The list that follows is roughly geographic (north to south) order.

== Northern Ireland ==
The Ulster Transport Authority, which controlled the railways in Northern Ireland between 1948 and 1966, replaced steam haulage on passenger trains with diesel multiple units, but had only two diesel shunting locomotives, which meant a continued role for steam on freight work. Twenty-three locomotives passed to Northern Ireland Railways in 1967, but most were not used again and all had been withdrawn by 1971.

=== Belfast and County Down Railway ===
The Belfast and County Down Railway was founded in 1848. It absorbed the Belfast, Hollywood and Bangor Railway in 1884 and continued operating until it was nationalised in its centenary year into the Ulster Transport Authority as a result of the Ireland Act 1949.

Type	Fleet numbers	Quantity built	Manufacturer	Dates built	Dates withdrawn	Notes
2-2-2	1–4	4	Bury, Curtis and Kennedy	1848	1858–1865	No. 2 renumbered 8 and rebuilt as 0–4–2; withdrawn 1890s
2-2-2WT	1T, 2T	2	William Fairbairn & Sons	1850–1851	1867–1877	Renumbered 4 and 5 in 1859
2-4-0T	5, 6	2	Beyer, Peacock & Company	1857–1858	1894–1894	No. 5 renumbered 7 in 1859
2-4-0T	8	1	Beyer, Peacock & Company	1859	1880s	
0-4-2	9, 10	2	William Fairbairn & Sons	1859	1886–1887	
2-4-0ST	11–13, 3, 5	5+2	Vulcan Foundry	1864–67	1890–1909	12–13 sold to BH&BR 1–2 in 1870; renumbered 15–16, along with two identical locos bought new by BH&BR (3 & 6) → BCDR 17, 20
2-4-0T	1	1	John Fowler & Co	1867	1909	rebuilt as 0–4–2 in 1884
2-4-0	12, 13	2	Manning Wardle	1868	1888–1904?	
0-6-0	14	1	Vulcan Foundry	1875	1904	
0-6-0	4	1	Beyer, Peacock & Company	1878	1922	
0-4-2	2	1	Sharp, Stewart & Company	1880	1937	rebuilt as 0-4-2T in 1902
0-4-2	8	1	BCDR Queens Quay Works, Belfast	1881	1897	
2-4-0T	18, 19	2	Yorkshire Engine Company	1870	1891	ex BH&BR 4 & 5
0-4-2	10, 9, 13, 16	4	Sharp, Stewart & Company	1886–1890	1914–1949	rebuilt as 0–4–2T (1900–1902); 9 renumbered 28 in 1945
2-4-2T	18, 19, 21, 22	4	Beyer, Peacock & Company	1891	1920	Compounds; rebuilt as 4-4-2T in late 1890s
2-4-0	23–25	3	Beyer, Peacock & Company	1892	1921	Compounds
0-6-0	26	1	Beyer, Peacock & Company	1892	1950	
2-4-0	6	1	Beyer, Peacock & Company	1894	1956	
2-4-2T	5, 7, 8, 27, 28, 29	6	Beyer, Peacock & Company	1896–1897	1923–1950	
4-4-2T	30	12	Beyer, Peacock & Company	1901–1921	1956–1962	UTA renumbered by adding 200
0-6-0	14	1	Beyer, Peacock & Company	1904	1954	Renumbered 214 by UTA
Railmotor	1–3	3	Kitson & Company	1905–1906	1924	Carriage portions saw further use
0-6-0	10, 4	2	Beyer, Peacock & Company	1914–1921	1956	4 renumbered 204 by UTA
4-6-4T	22–25	4	Beyer, Peacock & Company	1920	1956	Renumbered 222–225 by UTA
0-6-4T	29	1	Beyer, Peacock & Company	1923	1956	Renumbered 229 by UTA
4-4-2T	8, 16, 9	3	Beyer, Peacock & Company	1924–1945	1956	UTA renumbered by adding 200
C d	D1	1	Harland & Wolff	1933		Renumbered 2 in 1937
(1A)(A1)d	D2	1	Harland & Wolff	1937		Renumbered 28 in 1937

=== Belfast and Northern Counties Railway (1848–1903) & Northern Counties Committee (1903–1949) ===
The Belfast and Northern Counties Railway (BNCR), was a railway that served the north-east of Ireland. It had its origins in the Belfast and Ballymena Railway that opened to traffic on 11 April 1848. The Northern Counties Committee came into existence on 1 July 1903 as the result of the Midland Railway taking over the BNCR. At the 1923 Grouping the Committee became part of the London Midland & Scottish Railway (LMS); with the nationalisation of the railways in Britain in 1948 the line passed to the British Transport Commission and in the following year, 1949, it was sold to the Ulster Transport Authority (UTA) as a result of the Ireland Act 1949.

Belfast and Ballymena Railway (1848–1860) and other constituents

The early locomotives of the constituent companies were to assorted designs from a number of manufacturers. The first locomotives for the Belfast and Ballymena Railway were purchased from Bury, Curtis and Kennedy. These were four 2-2-2 singles and one 0-4-2 goods engine. Later, four more 2-2-2s were ordered but this time from Sharp Brothers. Fairbairn 2-2-2s were to be found on the Ballymena Ballymena, Ballymoney, Coleraine and Portrush Junction Railway but this company also favoured Sharp locomotives which were double framed 2-4-0s.

=== Belfast and Northern Counties Railway (1860–1903) ===
The BNCR introduced class letters for its locomotive stock in 1897. The MR (NCC) and later the LMS (NCC) continued to use the system adding new classes as required.

Class	Type	Fleet numbers	Quantity built	Manufacturer	Dates built	Dates withdrawn	Notes
A	4-4-0	3–5, 9, 17, 20, 34, 63–68	13	York Road Works (7); Derby Works (6)	1901–1908	1929–1936	Heavy compound locomotives
B	4-4-0	24, 59–62	5	Beyer, Peacock & Company	1897–1898	1924–1932	Light compound locomotives
C	2-4-0	21, 33, 50–52, 56–57	7	Beyer, Peacock & Company	1890–1895	1926–1942	Light compound locomotives; 50 renumbered 58
D	2-4-0	50, 55	2	Beyer, Peacock & Company	1895	1944–1946	Heavy compound locomotives; named Jubilee and Parkmount; rebuilt as 4-4-0 in 1897
E	0-6-0	53–54	2	Beyer, Peacock & Company	1892	1934–1944	Compound goods locomotives
F	2-4-0	45–46, 23	3	Beyer, Peacock & Company	1880–1885	1938–1942	
G	2-4-0	6, 8, 10–11, 22, 27, 29, 40–41	9	Sharp, Stewart & Company (7); Beyer, Peacock & Company (2)	1872–1878	1925–1933	
H	2-4-0	12–17	6	Sharp, Stewart & Company	1856	1908–1924	
I	2-4-0	40–41	2	Beyer, Peacock & Company	1868	1924	Renumbered 1–2
J	2-4-0T	25, 47–49	4	Beyer, Peacock & Company	1883	1932–1934	Rebuilt as saddle tanks
K	0-6-0	7, 28, 30–32, 38–39, 43–44	9	Sharp, Stewart & Company (7); Beyer, Peacock & Company (2)	1867–1880	1925–1947	
L	0-6-0	18–19, 35	3	Sharp, Stewart & Company	1857–1861	1925–1933	
L1	0-6-0	36–37	2	Beyer, Peacock & Company	1863	1928–1932	
M	0-4-2	26	1	York Road Works	1873	1925	
N	0-4-0ST	42	1	Sharp, Stewart & Company	1875	1925	
O	0-4-2ST	60–62	3	Black, Hawthorn & Company	1874–1875	1911–1923	Narrow gauge locomotives; ex Ballymena, Cushendall and Red Bay Railway 1–3; renumbered 101–103
P	2-4-0T	63–64	2	Beyer, Peacock & Company	1877–1878	1920–1928	Narrow gauge locomotives; ex Ballymena and Larne Railway 1 & 4; renumbered 104–105
Q	0-6-0T	65–67	3	Beyer, Peacock & Company	1877–1882	1931–1933	Narrow gauge locomotives; ex Ballymena & Larne Railway 2, 3 & 6; renumbered 106–108
R	2-6-0ST	68	1	Beyer, Peacock & Company	1880	1934	Narrow gauge locomotive; ex Ballymena & Larne Railway 5; renumbered 109
S	2-4-2T	69–70	2	Beyer, Peacock & Company	1882	1946–1954	Narrow gauge compound locomotives; renumbered 110–111

=== Northern Counties Committee (1903–1949) ===
Class	Type	Fleet numbers	Quantity built	Manufacturer	Dates built	Dates withdrawn	Notes
A1	4-4-0	3, 4, 9, 17, 34, 64–66, 68	9		(1927–34)	1947–1954	Simple rebuilds of class A
B1	4-4-0	60, 61	3		(1921)	(1932)	Rebuilds of class B
B2	4-4-0	24	1		(1925)	(1928)	Simple rebuilds of class B
B3	4-4-0	21, 24, 28, 60, 61	5		(1927–32)	1938–1947	Simple rebuilds of classes B1, B2, C and C1
C1	2-4-0	21, 51, 52, 57	4		(1926–31)	1931–1947	Rebuilds of class C
D1	4-4-0	50	1		(1926)	1946	Rebuild of class D
E1	0-6-0	53–54	2		(1907–11)	1934–1944	Rebuilds of class E
F1	2-4-0	46	1		(1928)	1938	Rebuild of class F
G1	2-4-0	6, 10, 27	3		(1910–13)	1931–1933	Rebuilds of class G
K1	0-6-0	30, 32, 38–39, 43–44	6		(1909–22)	1927–1938	Rebuilds of class K
S	2-4-2T	112–113, 103–104	4	York Road Works	1908–1920	1938–1954	Narrow gauge compound locomotives; 112–113 renumbered 102–101
S1	2-4-2T	101–102	2		(1928–1930)	1942	Narrow gauge compound locomotives; rebuilds of class S; renumbered 41–42
S2	2-4-4T	110	1		(1931)	1946	Narrow gauge compound locomotive; rebuild of class S
T		90–91	2	Derby Works	1905	1913	Railmotor units
T	4-4-2T	113–114	2	Kitson & Company	1908	1940–1942	Narrow gauge locomotives; ex Ballycastle Railway 3 & 4
N	0-4-0ST	16	1	York Road Works	1914	1951	
U	4-4-0	14–15, 69–70	4	Derby Works	1914–1922	1924–1937	Renumbered 70–73; rebuilt as class U2
U1	4-4-0	1–4	4	York Road Works	1924–1931	1946–1949	Named after Glens
U2	4-4-0	70–87	18	North British Locomotive Company (7); York Road Works (7+4)	1924–1936	1956–1963	
V	0-6-0	71–73	3	Derby Works	1923	1961–1964	"renumbered" X–Z; then 13–15
—	?	91	1	Sentinel Waggon Works	1925	1932	
W	2-6-0	90–104	15	Derby Works (4); York Road Works (11)	1933–1942	1956–1965	Most named
WT	2-6-4T	1–10, 50–57	18	Derby Works	1946–1950	1968–1971	Nicknamed "Jeeps"
Y	0-6-0T	18–19	2	WG Bagnall (1); Hunslet Engine Company (1)	1926–1928	1956–1963	Re-gauged LMS Fowler Class 3F; arrived 1944

== Cross-Border Lines ==
Following the division of Ireland in 1921 into two administrations, a number of railways now found themselves operating on both sides of the newly created boundary between Northern Ireland and the Irish Free State (later Republic of Ireland).

=== West Donegal Railway ===
The 3-foot (914 mm) West Donegal Railway became the Donegal Railway in 1892; and the County Donegal Railways Joint Committee after being jointly acquired in 1906 by the Great Northern Railway and the Midland Railway's Northern Counties Committee.

Class	Type	Fleet numbers	Quantity built	Manufacturer	Dates built	Dates withdrawn	Notes
1	2-4-0T	1–3	3	Sharp, Stewart & Company	1881	1909–1926	
2	4-6-0T	4–9	6	Neilson & Company	1893	1931–1937	
3	4-4-4T	10–11	2	Neilson, Reid & Company	1902	1933	
4	4-6-4T	12–15	4	Nasmyth, Wilson & Company	1904	1953–1959	Renumbered 9–12 in 1937
5	2-6-4T	16–20	5	Nasmyth, Wilson & Company	1907	1940–1950	Renumbered 4–8 in 1937
5A	2-6-4T	21, 2A, 3A	3	Nasmyth, Wilson & Company	1912	1959	Renumbered 1–3 in 1937

=== Dundalk, Newry and Greenore Railway ===
Class	Type	Fleet numbers	Quantity built	Manufacturer	Dates built	Dates withdrawn	Notes
—	0-6-0ST	1–6	6	LNWR Crewe Works	1873–1898	1928–1951	

=== Great Northern Railway ===
The Great Northern Railway (GNR) was formed in 1876 acquiring a variety of locomotives. Nos 1 to 23 were from Dublin and Drogheda Railway; Nos. 24 to 41 from the Dublin and Belfast Junction Railway; Nos. 43 to circa 78 from the Irish North Western Railway and Londonderry and Enniskillen Railway; Numbers in the eighties from the Newry and Armagh Railway and nos. 100 to 141 from the Ulster Railway. Later acquisitions in the 1880s from the Newry, Warrenpoint, and Rostrevor and the Belfast Central Railway were numbered in the Nineties. The GNR straddled the border between the Republic and Northern Ireland (after 1921), and so was not incorporated in either the CIÉ or Ulster Transport Authority. However, mounting losses saw the network purchased jointly by the Irish and British governments on 1 September 1953. It was run as a joint board, independent of the CIÉ and UTA, until 30 September 1958 when it was dissolved and the remaining stock split equally between the two railways.

? (1877–1881)

Class	Type	Fleet numbers	Quantity built	Manufacturer	Dates built	Dates withdrawn	Notes
B	0-6-0	6, 26–27, 34, 62–63, 65–67	9	Sharp, Stewart & Company	1877–1880	1925–1938	
G	2-4-0	24–25, 46–47, 59, 80	6	Beyer, Peacock & Company	1877–1883	1913–1921	Several renumbered
H	2-4-0	84–87	4	Beyer, Peacock & Company	1880–1881	1931–1932	

James Crawford Park (1881–1895)

Class	Type	Fleet numbers	Quantity built	Manufacturer	Dates built	1958 CIÉ	1958 UTA	Dates withdrawn	Notes
A	0-6-0	28, 31, 33, 79–83, 60–61, 64, 145–146, 149–150	15	Beyer, Peacock & Company (13); Dundalk Works (2)	1882–1891	3	0	1937–1961	Several renumbered; three sold to SL&NCR
BT	4-4-0T	2–8, 91–92, 97–100	13	Beyer, Peacock & Company (3); Dundalk Works (10)	1885–1893	—	—	1910–1935	Several renumbered
J	4-4-0	17–21, 45, 48, 115–119	12	Beyer, Peacock & Company	1885–1889	—	—	1921–1934	45/48 renumbered 15/16; two sold to SL&NCR
JS	4-2-2	88–89	2	Beyer, Peacock & Company	1885	—	—	1904	Named Victoria and Albert
P	4-4-0	51–54, 72–73, 82–83	8	Beyer, Peacock & Company	1892–1895	3	0	1950–1959	Rebuilt with superheaters as class Ps
AL	0-6-0	29, 32, 36, 55–59, 151–153	11	Beyer, Peacock & Company (7); Dundalk Works (4)	1893–1896	6	2	1957–1961	151/152 renumbered 141/140
JT	2-4-2T	90, 93–94, 95, 13–14	6	Dundalk Works	1895–1902	1	0	1955–1963	13/14 renumbered 91/92

Charles Clifford (1895–1912)

Class	Type	Fleet numbers	Quantity built	Manufacturer	Dates built	1958 CIÉ	1958 UTA	Dates withdrawn	Notes
PP	4-4-0	12, 25, 42–46, 50, 70–71, 74–77, 106–107, 129	17	Beyer, Peacock & Company (15); Dundalk Works (2)	1896–1911	5	7	1957–1963	Rebuilt with superheaters as class PPs
PG	0-6-0	10–11, 78, 100–103	7	Neilson, Reid & Company (3); Dundalk Works (4)	1899–1904	0	7	1960–1964	Rebuilt with superheaters as class PGs
Q	4-4-0	120–125, 130–136	13	Neilson, Reid & Company (9); North British Locomotive Company (2); Beyer, Peacock & Company (2)	1899–1904	5	4	1951–1963	Rebuilt with superheaters as class Qs
QG	0-6-0	152–155	4	North British Locomotive Company	1903–1904	4	0	1962–1963	Rebuilt with superheaters as class QGs
P	4-4-0	88–89, 104–105	4	Dundalk Works	1904–1906	1	0	1956–1960	Rebuilt with superheaters as class Ps
QL	4-4-0	24, 113–114, 126–128, 156–157	8	North British Locomotive Company (7); Beyer, Peacock & Company (1)	1904–1910	0	3	1932–1960	Rebuilt with superheaters as class QLs
QGT	0-6-2T	98–99	2	Robert Stephenson & Company	1905	1	0	1957–1960	Rebuilt with superheaters as class QGTs
LQG	0-6-0	78, 108, 110–111, 158–164	11	North British Locomotive Company (9); Dundalk Works (2)	1906–1908	6	5	1958–1963	Rebuilt with superheated as class LQGs
RT	0-6-4T	22–23, 166–167	4	Beyer, Peacock & Company	1908–1911	0	4	1958–1963	
NQG	0-6-0	9, 38–39, 109, 112	5	Nasmyth, Wilson & Company	1911	2	3	1958–1963	Four rebuilt with superheaters as class NQGs; one rebuilt to class LQGs
NLQG	0-6-0	165	1	Nasmyth, Wilson & Company	1911	0	1	1961	Rebuilt to class LQGs
QGT2	0-6-2T	168–169	2	Robert Stephenson & Company	1911	—	—	1957	
S	4-4-0	170–174	5	Beyer, Peacock & Company	1913	3	2	1964–1965	Named after mountains; CIÉ locos to UTA in 1963
SG	0-6-0	37, 40–41, 137–138	5	Beyer, Peacock & Company	1913	3	2	1961–1965	

G. T. Glover (1912–1933)

Class	Type	Fleet numbers	Quantity built	Manufacturer	Dates built	1958 CIÉ	1958 UTA	Dates withdrawn	Notes
T	4-4-2T	185–189	5	Beyer, Peacock & Company	1913	1	4	1959–1964	Rebuilt with superheaters as class T1
SG2	0-6-0	180–184	5	Beyer, Peacock & Company	1915	3	2	1961–1963	
S2	4-4-0	190–192	3	Beyer, Peacock & Company	1915	1	2	1960–65	
U	4-4-0	196–200	5	Beyer, Peacock & Company	1915	3	2	1959–1963	Named after Loughs
SG3	0-6-0	6–8, 13–14, 20, 47–49, 96–97, 117–118, 201–202	15	Beyer, Peacock & Company	1920–1921	7	8	1960–1967	201–202 renumbered 40–41
T2	4-4-2T	1–5	5	Beyer, Peacock & Company	1921	2	3	1959–1964	
T2	4-4-2T	21, 30, 115–116, 139, 142–144, 147–148	10	Nasmyth, Wilson & Company	1924	6	4	1958–1963	147–148 renumbered 67 and 69
SG2	0-6-0	15–19	5	Nasmyth, Wilson & Company	1924–1926	2	3	1959–1965	
Crane	0-6-0CT	31	1	Hawthorn Leslie	1928	0	0	1963	to Dundalk Engineering Co. (as part of Dundalk Works) in 1958; to CIÉ in 1960
T2	4-4-2T	62–66	5	Beyer, Peacock & Company	1929–1930	3	2	1959–1960	
V	4-4-0	83–87	5	Beyer, Peacock & Company	1932	2	3	1959–1963	Three-cylinder compound; named after birds of prey

G. B. Howden (1933–1939)

Class	Type	Fleet numbers	Quantity built	Manufacturer	Dates built	1958 CIÉ	1958 UTA	Dates withdrawn	Notes
UG	0-6-0	78–82	5	Dundalk Works	1937	2	3	1960–1965	

H. R. McIntosh (1939–1953)

Class	Type	Fleet numbers	Quantity made	Manufacturer	Dates built	1958 CIÉ	1958 UTA	Dates withdrawn	Notes
UG	0-6-0	145–149	5	Beyer, Peacock & Company	1948	3	2	1960–1968	
U	4-4-0	201–205	5	Beyer, Peacock & Company	1948	2	3	1962–1965	Named after counties
VS	4-4-0	206–210	5	Beyer, Peacock & Company	1948	3	2	1960–1965	Three-cylinder simple; named after rivers

=== Londonderry and Lough Swilly Railway ===
Broad gauge locomotives (1862–1882)

Type	Fleet numbers	Quantity built	Manufacturer	Dates built	Dates withdrawn	Notes
0-6-0T	1–2	2	G&W	1862	1883–1885	No. 2 renumbered 3; No. 1 sold to Londonderry Port and Harbour Commissioners
0-6-0ST	3–4	2	Robert Stephenson & Company	1864	1869–1882	No. 4 renumbered 2; Sold to Londonderry Port and Harbour Commissioners
0-6-0T	4–5	2	Sharp, Stewart & Company	1876–1879	1885	Sold to Cork and Bandon Railway as their Nos. 14–15

Narrow gauge locomotives (1882–1954)

Type	Fleet numbers	Quantity built	Manufacturer	Dates built	Dates withdrawn	Notes
0-6-2WT	1	1	Black, Hawthorn & Company	1882	1911	Sold to a contractor
0-6-2T	2–3	2	Black, Hawthorn & Company	1883	1912–1913	
0-6-0T	4	1	Black, Hawthorn & Company	1885	1940	renumbered 17 in 1913
2-4-0T	5–6	2	Robert Stephenson & Company	1874	1899	Ex Glenariff Iron Ore and Harbour Company, acquired 1885; renumbered 5A and 6A in 1899
4-6-2T	5–8	4	Hudswell Clarke	1899–1902	1940–1954	5 and 6 renumbered 15 and 16 in 1913
4-6-0T	1–4	4	Andrew Barclay Sons & Co	1902	1940–1954	Owned by the Letterkenny and Burtonport Extension Railway
4-6-2T	9–10	2	Kerr, Stuart & Company	1904	1928–1954	
4-8-0	11–12	2	Hudswell Clarke	1905	1933–1954	
4-6-2T	13–14	2	Hawthorn Leslie	1910	1940–1943	to Letterkenny and Burtonport Extension Railway in exchange for L&BER 5 and 6
4-8-4T	5–6	2	Hudswell Clarke	1912	1954	Owned by the Letterkenny and Burtonport Extension Railway; to L&LSR in exchange for 13 and 14.

=== Sligo, Leitrim and Northern Counties Railway ===
The Sligo, Leitrim and Northern Counties Railway was a small cross-border railway that closed in 1957. Its locomotive fleet never carried numbers, only names.

Class	Type	Names	Quantity built	Manufacturer	Dates built	Dates withdrawn	Notes
Pioneer	0-6-2T	Pioneer; Sligo	2	Avonside Engine Company	1877	1921	
Leitrim	0-6-4T	Fermanagh; Leitrim; Lurganboy; Lissadell; Hazlewood	5	Beyer, Peacock & Company	1882–1899	1947–1957	also known as Fermanagh class
Erne	4-4-0T	Erne	1	Hudswell Clarke	1883	1910	rebuilt as 4-4-2T in 1885
Faugh-a-Ballagh	0-4-0ST	Faugh-a-Ballagh	1	Hunslet Engine Company	1878	?	Acquired 1897: ex contractors' locomotive
Waterford	0-6-0T	Waterford	1	Hunslet Engine Company	1893	?	Acquired 1897: ex contractors' locomotive
Sir Henry	0-6-4T	Sir Henry; Enniskillen; Lough Gill	3	Beyer, Peacock & Company	1904–1917	1957	
Glencar	4-4-0	Blacklion; Glencar	(2)	Beyer, Peacock & Company	1885–87	1928–1931	Acquired 1921: ex GNRI Class J nos. 118 (Blacklion) and 119 (Glencar)
Sligo	0-6-0	Glencar ‘A’ Sligo; Sligo	(3)	Beyer, Peacock & Company	1882–1890	1940–1949	Acquired 1927–1940: ex GNRI Class A nos. 31 (Glencar) and 149 (Sligo); latter swapped for GNRI 69 in 1940
Lough	0-6-4T	Lough Melvin; Lough Erne	2	Beyer, Peacock & Company	1949	1957	to UTA in 1959 as nos. 26–27, UTA class Z; withdrawn 1968–1970

== Irish Free State and Republic of Ireland ==
The railways wholly in the Irish Free State were merged into one private company — Great Southern Railways — in 1925. The GSR renumbered all the broad gauge locomotives into one series with the former Great Southern and Western Railway locomotives retaining their old number. The GSR had two parallel classification systems – a numerical system which was the lowest number of a locomotive in that class, and an alpha-numerical which used a letter to indicate the wheel arrangement, and a number, with the lowest number given to the most powerful class with that wheel arrangement. The latter system was only used by Inchicore Works for accounting purposes, while the former was used by locomotive crews and the drawing office at Inchicore Works.

Letter	Wheel Arrangement	Letter	Wheel Arrangement	Letter	Wheel Arrangement
A	4-8-0T	F	2-4-2T	K	2-6-0
B	4-6-0	G	2-4-0	L	0-4-2
C	4-4-2	H	0-6-4	M	0-4-0
D	4-4-0	I	0-6-2T	N	2-2-2
E	0-4-4T	J	0-6-0	P	2-6-2

Note that narrow gauge locomotive classes included the letter N after the prefix letter, letter C was also used for Bo-Bo diesels, and that letters B, C, D, F, J, and K were used for the same wheel arrangements by the London and North Eastern Railway, while E and G changed places.

In 1945, the GSR became part of Córas Iompair Éireann (CIÉ), which amalgamated the railway, road transport and canal functions of the State. CIÉ was nationalised in 1950 and settled on a policy of replacing steam with diesel locomotives, a process that was completed in 1962.

=== Midland Great Western Railway (1847–1924) ===
M. Atock (1872–1901)

- MGWR Class D – GSR Class 530 or Class D16
- MGWR Class E – GSR Class 551 or Class J26
- MGWR Class H – GSR Class 619 or Class J6
- MGWR Class K – GSR Class 650 or Class G2
- MGWR Classes L and Lm – GSR Classes 573 and 594, Classes J18 and J19
- MGWR Class Ln – GSR Class 563 or Class J16
- MGWR Class P – GSR Class 614 or Class J10
- MGWR Class W – GSR Class 234 or Class J17

E. Cusack (1901–1915)

- MGWR Classes A, As and A1 – GSR class 545 or Class D5
- MGWR Class B – GSR Class 646 or Class J2
- MGWR Classes C and Cs – GSR Class 536 or Class D7
- MGWR Classes C and C1 – GSR Class 540 or Class D6

W. H. Morton (1915–1924)

- MGWR Classes F, Fa, and Fb – GSR Class 623 or Class J5

=== Great Southern and Western Railway (1845–1924) ===
Alexander McDonnell (1864–1883)

- GS&WR Class 2 – GSR Class 2 or Class D19
- GS&WR Class 21 – GSR Class 21 or Class G4
- GS&WR Class 47 – GSR Class 47 or Class E3
- GS&WR Class 90 – GSR Class 90 or Class J30
- GS&WR Class 91 – GSR Class 91 or Class J29
- GS&WR Class 92 – GSR Class 92 or Class H2
- GS&WR Class 101 – GSR Class 101 or Class J15
- GS&WR Class 203 – GSR Class 203 or Class H1
- GS&WR Class 204 – GSR Class 204 or Class J12
- GS&WR Class Sprite – GSR Class Sprite or Classes L4 and L5

John Aspinall (1883–1886)

- GS&WR Class 52 – GSR Class 52 or Class D17
- GS&WR Class 60 – GSR Class 60 or Class D14

Henry Ivatt (1886–1896)

- GS&WR Class 33 – GSR Class 33 or Class F6
- GS&WR Class 37 – GSR Class 37 or Class C7
- GS&WR Class 201 – GSR Class 201 or Class J11
- GS&WR Jumbo – GSR Class Jumbo or Class J13

Robert Coey (1896–1911)

- GS&WR Class 27 – GSR Class 27 or Class C4
- GS&WR Class 211 – GSR Class 211 or Class J3
- GS&WR Class 213 – GSR Class 213 or Class I1
- GS&WR Class 301 – GSR Class 301 or Class D11
- GS&WR Class 305 – GSR Class 305 or Class D12
- GS&WR Class 309 – GSR Class 309 or Classes D3 and D10
- GS&WR Class 321 – GSR Class 321 or Classes D2, D3, and D4
- GS&WR Class 333 – GSR Class 333 or Classes D2, D3, D4, and D4a
- GS&WR Class 341 – GSR Class 341 or Class D1
- GS&WR Class 351 – GSR Class 351 or Class J9
- GS&WR Class 355 – GSR Class 355 or Class K3
- GS&WR Class 362 – GSR Class 362 or Class B3 – "Long Toms"
- GS&WR Class 368 – GSR Class 368 or Class K4

Richard Maunsell (1911–1913)

- GS&WR Class 257 – GSR Class 257 or Class J4
- GS&WR Sambo – GSR Class Sambo or Class L2

E. A. Watson (1913–1922)

- GS&WR Class 900 – GSR Class 900 or Class A1
- GS&WR 400 Class – GSR Class 400 or Classes B2 & B2a

J. R. Bazin (1922–1924)

- GS&WR Class 500 – GSR Class 500 or Class B1

==== Waterford & Limerick Railway ====
The Waterford and Limerick Railway changed its name to Waterford, Limerick and Western Railway in 1896. It was acquired by the Great Southern and Western Railway in 1900; by which time all but one of its locomotive fleet had been designed by Robinson.

Type	Fleet numbers	Quantity built	Manufacturer	Dates built	GSWR Class	GSWR Nos.	GSR Class	Inchicore Class	Dates withdrawn	Notes
2-2-2	WLR 1 to 6	6	Stothert & Slaughter	1847	—	—	—	—	1860–1862	
2-2-2	WLR 7	1	?	?	—	—	—	—	1871	Acquired secondhand from William Dargan in 1853; origin unknown
2-2-2	WLR 8 to 10	3	Bury, Curtis and Kennedy	1848–49	—	—	—	—	1880–88	Acquired secondhand from William Dargan in 1850–52; né Newry, Warrenpoint and Rostrevor Railway 1 to 3 (not in order)
2-4-0	WLR 11 to 12, 17 to 21	7	William Fairbairn & Sons	1853–55	264	264	—	—	1872–1903	
0-4-2	WLR 13 to 16	4	Sharp, Stewart & Company	1853–54	—	—	—	—	1891–96	
0-4-2	WLR 4 to 6	3	Sharp, Stewart & Company	1862–64	223	223	—	—	1890–1901	
2-2-2	WLR 28	1	Kitson & Company	1864	280	280	—	—	1902	
0-4-0ST	WLR 29	1	Sharp, Stewart & Company	1865	228	228	228	—	1925	
0-4-2	WLR 3 and 7	2	Kitson & Company	1876	—	—	—	—	1888–92	
2-4-0	WLR 25, 31 to 32, 8, 35 to 39	10	Vulcan Foundry	1874–82	281	277, 281–283, 261, 285–289	—	—	1902–11	
0-4-2	WLR 19, 26, 27 and 33	4	Avonside Engine Company	1876	278	272, 278, 284	—	—	1899–1910	
0-6-0T	WLR 34	1	?	?	229	229	—	—	1901	Acquired secondhand in 1878
0-6-0	WLR 40 and 41	2	Vulcan Foundry	1883	230	230–231	—	—	1909–10	
0-6-0WT	WLR 42	1	Hawthorns & Co. (Leith)	1862	232	232	—	—	1901	Acquired secondhand in 1883; ex Neath & Brecon Railway No. 3; né Anglesey Central Railway
0-6-0	WLR 1	1	Robert Stephenson & Company	1879	221	221	—	—	1909	Acquired second-hand in 1884; rebuilt as 0-6-0ST in 1899
4-4-0	WLR 9	1	Dübs & Company	1886	262	262	—	—	1912	
4-4-0	WLR 12	1	Vulcan Foundry	1886	265	265	—	—	1907	
0-6-0	WLR 24	1	Dübs & Company	1886	227	227	—	—	1910	

J. G. Robinson (1888–1900)

Type	Fleet numbers	Quantity built	Manufacturer	Dates built	GSWR Class	GSWR Nos.	GSR Class	Inchicore Class	Dates withdrawn	Notes
0-6-0	WLR 5 to 7	3	Limerick Works	1888–93	224	224 to 226	—	—	1905–1909	
2-4-0	WLR 10, 22, 20, 23, 43, 44, 47, and 48	8	Dübs & Company	1889–94	276	263, 275, 273, 276, 290 to 293	276	G3	1907–1959	
2-4-2T	WLR 13 and 14	2	Vulcan Foundry	1891	266	226 and 227	267; 491	F4; F5	1933–1935	226 sold to CMDR 6 in 1913; to GSR 491 in 1925
0-4-2T	WLR 3	1	Limerick Works	1892	260	260	—	—	1912	
0-6-0	WLR 45, 46, 49, and 50	4	Dübs & Company	1893–95	233	233 to 236	235	J22	1911–1951	
0-4-4T	WLR 15	1	Limerick Works	1894	268	268	—	—	1912	
0-4-4T	WLR 51 and 52	2	Kitson & Company	1895	294	294 and 295	295	E2	1910–1954	
4-4-2T	WLWR 16 to 18, and 21	4	Kitson & Company	1896–97	269	269 to 271, 274	269	C5	1949–1957	
4-4-0	WLWR 53 to 55	3	Kitson & Company	1896–97	296	296 to 298	296	D15	1928–1949	
0-6-0	WLWR 56 to 58	3	Kitson & Company	1897	237	237 to 239	222	J25	1934–1951	
0-4-4T	WLWR 27	1	Limerick Works	1899	279	279	279	E1	1953	
0-6-0	WLWR 2, 4, 11	3	Kitson & Company	1900	222	222,	222	J25	1929–1950	4 and 11 sold before delivery to MGWR 141 and 142

=== Dublin and Kingstown Railway ===
Type	Class lead	Quantity built	Manufacturer	Dates built	GSR Class	Inchicore Class	GSR Nos.	Dates withdrawn	Notes
2-2-0 (Note: Subsequently converted to 2-2-2T)	Vauxhall	3	George Forrester and Company	1834	—	—	—	—	Dublin, Kingstown & Vauxhall - subsequently converted to 2-2-2T
2-2-0	Hibernia	3	Sharp Brothers	1834	—	—	—	1842	Hibernia, Britania, Manchester
2-2-0	Star	1	Horseley Iron Company	1836	—	—	—	—	Star
2-2-0T	Victoria	2	George Forrester and Company	1836	—	—	—	—	Victoria & Comet - first tank locomotives in public service subsequently converted to 2-2-2T
2-2-2T	Princess	5	Grand Canal Street	1841	—	—	—	—	Princess, Belleisle, Shamrock, Erin, Albert
2-2-2T	Burgoyne	4	Grand Canal Street	1845	—	—	—	—	Burgoyne, Cyclops, Vulcan, Jupiter (increased wheelbase)

=== Dublin and South Eastern Railway (1853–1924) ===
The Dublin and South Eastern Railway started out in 1846 as the Waterford, Wexford, Wicklow and Dublin Railway Company. In 1853 it was renamed the Dublin and Wicklow Railway Company, and in 1860 it was renamed the Dublin, Wicklow and Wexford Railway Company and on 31 December 1906 it was renamed again as the Dublin and South Eastern.

Frederick Pemberton (1854–1856)
S. W. Haughton (1856–1864)
William Meikle (1856–1864)

Type	Fleet numbers	Quantity built	Manufacturer	Dates built	GSR Class	Inchicore Class	GSR Nos.	Dates withdrawn	Notes
2-2-2WT	D&WR 1 and 2	2	William Fairbairn & Sons	1853	—	—	—	1892–1901	No. 2 renumbered 45 in 1885
2-4-0	D&WR 3	1	William Fairbairn & Sons	1853	—	—	—	1898	Rebuilt as 2-4-0T in 1884
2-2-2T	D&WR 4 and 5	2	William Fairbairn & Sons	1853	—	—	—	1872–1900	No. 5 renumbered 5A in 1897
2-2-2ST	D&WR 6, 7, 10 and 11	4	Vulcan Foundry	1854–55	—	—	—	1902–03	Renumbered 6A, 7A, 10A, 11 between 1894 and 1896
2-4-0ST	D&WR 8 and 9	2	Vulcan Foundry	1855	—	—	—	1890–1903	Rebuilt as 2-4-0T
2-4-0	DWWR 12 to 14	3	William Fairbairn & Sons	1860	—	—	—	1902–23	
0-4-2	DWWR 15 and 16	2	Sharp, Stewart & Company	1860	—	—	—	1922–25	
0-4-2	DWWR 17 to 23	7	Sharp, Stewart & Company	1864	—	—	—	1899–1925	No. 21 rebuilt as 0-4-2T in 1904

J. Wakefield (1865–1882)

Type	Fleet numbers	Quantity built	Manufacturer	Dates built	GSR Class	Inchicore Class	GSR Nos.	Dates withdrawn	Notes
2-4-0	DWWR 24 to 26, 32, and 33	5	Sharp, Stewart & Company	1864–73	422	G7	422	1928	No. 26 rebuilt as 2-4-0T in 1900
2-2-2WT	DWWR Ariel et al.	7	Neilson & Company	1865	—	—	—	1886–94	Ariel, Elfin, Kate Kearney, Kelpie, Oberon, Titania, Banshee. Four sold to contractors
2-2-2WT	DWWR 27 and 28	2	Grand Canal Street	1869	—	—	—	1887	
2-2-2WT	DWWR 29 to 31, 34 to 36, 4, 40 and 27	9	Grand Canal Street (7); Neilson & Company (2)	1871–1887	—	—	—	1902–23	4 renumbered 30 in 1902
0-4-2	DWWR 37 to 39	3	Sharp, Stewart & Company	1876	—	—	—	1923–25	
2-4-0WT	DWWR 41	1	Grand Canal Street	1882	—	—	—	1925	rebuilt as 2-4-0T in 1903

W. Wakefield (1882–1894)

Type	Fleet numbers	Quantity built	Manufacturer	Dates built	GSR Class	Inchicore Class	GSR Nos.	Dates withdrawn	Notes
2-4-0T	DWWR 42 to 44	3	Beyer, Peacock & Company	1883	—	—	—	1925	
2-4-0T	DWWR 1, 2, 6, 7, 9, 10, 28, 45 to 47, and 49	11	Grand Canal Street	1885–96	423	G1	423–426	1925–55	10, 28, 45, 46 rebuilt as 2-4-2T between 1900 and 1910
2-4-2T	DWWR 3, 11	2	Grand Canal Street	1896–98	428,430	F2	428	1953	
2-4-2T	DWWR 10, 28, 45, 46	(4)		(1900–10)	428	F2	429–433	1925–57	rebuilt from 2-4-0T
0-6-0	DWWR 50 and 51	2	Vulcan Foundry	1891	447	J7	447	1925–30	
4-4-2T	DWWR 52 to 54	3	Sharp, Stewart & Company	1893	458	C3	458–460	1953–1960	

T. Grierson (1894–1897)

Type	Fleet numbers	Quantity built	Manufacturer	Dates built	GSR Class	Inchicore Class	GSR Nos.	Dates withdrawn	Notes
4-4-0	DWWR 55 to 58	4	Vulcan Foundry	1895–96	450	D9	450–453	1929–40	

R. Cronin (1897–1917)

Type	Fleet numbers	Quantity built	Manufacturer	Dates built	GSR Class	Inchicore Class	GSR Nos.	Dates withdrawn	Notes
0-6-2T	DWWR 4 and 5	2	Kitson & Company	1897	448	J1	448–449	1940–50	rebuilt as 0-6-0 in 1908
0-6-0	DWWR 17	1	Grand Canal Street	1899	440	J20	440	1929	
0-4-2	DWWR 48	1	Grand Canal Street	1899	—	—	—	1913	
0-6-0	DWWR 36	1	Grand Canal Street	1900	441	J14	441	1934	
2-4-2T	DWWR 8, 12, 27, 29, 30, 40	6	Grand Canal Street	1901–09	434	F1	434–439	1950–53	
2-4-2T	DWWR 59 to 64	6	Crewe Works	1883–96	427		427	1916–36	ex London & North Western Railway 4-ft 6-in Tanks, acquired 1902 and regauged
0-6-0	DWWR 13, 14, 18, 65, and 66	5	Grand Canal Street (3); Beyer, Peacock & Company (2)	1905	442	J8	442–446	1930–1957	
4-4-0	DWWR 67 and 68	2	Beyer, Peacock & Company	1905	454	D8	454	1925–1949	
Railmotor	DWWR 1 and 2	2	Manning Wardle	1906	—	—	—	(1907)	Rebuilt 1907 as separate 0-4-0T and coach; locos numbered 69–70
0-4-0T	DSER 69 and 70	2	Manning Wardle	(1907)	Imp	M1	Elf; Imp	1928–31	Rebuilt from railmotors 1 and 2; later Class M2
4-4-2T	DSER 20, 34, and 35	3	Grand Canal Street (1); Beyer, Peacock & Company (2)	1911–1924	455	C2	455–457	1955–59	

G. H. Wild (1917–1924)

Type	Fleet numbers	Quantity built	Manufacturer	Dates built	GSR Class	Inchicore Class	GSR Nos.	Dates withdrawn	Notes
2-6-0	DSER 15 and 16	2	Beyer, Peacock & Company	1922	461	K2	461–462	1963–65	

=== Cork, Bandon and South Coast Railway (to 1924) ===
Type	Fleet numbers	Quantity built	Manufacturer	Dates built	GSR Class	Inchicore Class	GSR Nos.	Dates withdrawn	Notes
0-2-2WT	1, 2	2	William Bridges Adams	1849	—	—	—	1867	
2-2-2	3, 4	2	Vulcan Foundry	1849–1851	—	—	—	1889–1890	
0-4-2	5, 6	2	Sharp, Stewart & Company	1852	—	—	—	1879–1887	
2-4-0T	1, 2, 8, 13 and 4A	5	Dübs & Company	1874–1887	482	G6	477, 482	1919–1930	
2-4-0T	9 and 10	2	J. Cross	1865	—	—	—	1893–1895	ex West Cork Railways 1 and 2, acquired 1880
2-4-0ST	11	1	Vulcan Foundry	1877	—	—	—	1904	ex West Cork Railways 3, acquired 1880
0-6-0ST	5, 6, 12, 16, 17	5	Beyer, Peacock & Company	1891–1894	472; 474; 475	J24; J23; J21	–	1925–40	
0-6-0T	14, 15	2	Sharp, Stewart & Company	1876–1879	—	—	—	1908–1910	ex Londonderry & Lough Swilly Railway 4 and 5, acquired 1885 rebuilt as 4-4-0T between 1893 and 1898
4-4-0T	3, 9, 10, 18	4	Dübs & Company (2); Neilson & Company (2)	1891–1894	471; 479	C6	471; 479–481	1930–1936	most rebuilt as 4–4–2T between 1898 and 1902; No. 10 rebuilt as 4-6-0T in 1906
0-6-2ST	19, 20	2	Baldwin Locomotive Works	1900	—	—	—	1912–1914	
4-4-0T	CBSCR 7	1	Cork Works	1901	478		478	1934	
4-6-0T	4, 8, 11, 13, 14, 15, 19, 20	8	Beyer, Peacock & Company	1906–1920	463	B4	463–470	1945–1961	

=== Minor broad gauge railways ===
==== Waterford & Tramore Railway ====
- WTR Nos. 1 and 2 – GSR Class 483 or N1
- WTR No. 3 – GSR Class 485 or L3
- WTR No. 4 – GSR Class 486 or L1

==== Cork & Macroom Direct Railway ====
- CMDR Nos. 2–4 – GSR Class 487 or G5
- CMDR No. 5 – GSR Class 490 or I2
- CMDR No. 6 – GSR Class 491 or F5

==== Timoleague & Courtmacsherry Light Railway ====
- TCLR Argadeen – GSR Class K5
- TCLR St. Molaga – GSR Class L6

=== Narrow gauge railways ===
==== Cavan & Leitrim Railway (to 1924) ====
- CLR 1 to 8 — GSR Class 1L or Class DN2
- CLR 9 – GSR Class 9L or HN1

==== Cork, Blackrock & Passage Railway (to 1924) ====
- CBPR 1 to 3 – Broad gauge 2-2-2WT
- CBPR 4 to 7 – GSR Class 4P or Class FN1, later Class 10L

==== Cork & Muskerry Light Railway (to 1924) ====
- CMLR 1 to 3 – GSR Class 1K or Class DN6
- CMLR 4 and 5 – GSR Class 5K or Class EN1, later Class 6S
- CMLR 7 – GSR Class 7K or DN3
- CMLR 8 – GSR Class 8K or DN7

==== Schull & Skibbereen Railway (to 1924) ====
- SSLR 1 to 3 – GSR Class 2S or Class MN1
- SSLR 4 – GSR Class 4S or Class DN5
- SSLR 1 and 3 – GSR Class 1S or Class DN4

==== Tralee & Dingle Light Railway (to 1924) ====
- TDLR 1 to 3, 6, and 8 – GSR Class 1T or Class KN2
- TDLR 5 – GSR Class 5T or Class PN2 Currently preserved
- TDLR 7 and 8 – GSR Class 4T or Class KN1

==== West Clare Railway (to 1924) ====
- WCR 5 to 7 – GSR Class 5C or Class IN1. No 5 is preserved and operational at the West Clare preserved Railway
- WCR 2, 4, 8, and 9 – GSR Class 2C or Class PN1
- WCR 10 – GSR Class 10C or Class BN1
- WCR 11 – GSR Class 11C or Class BN2
- WCR 1 – GSR Class 1C or Class BN3
- WCR 3 and 7 – GSR Class 3C or Class BN4

=== Bord Na Mona ===
- BNM 1/3 WN 2263-2265 Originally numbered 1-3 Renumbered to LM43/45. Extensively upgraded and Modified E Class locomotives from WW1. All 3 survive in Preservation. 1 is now No 7 on the Talyllyn. No 2 resides operational on the Stradbally Woodland Railway. No 3 "Shane" now preserved and awaiting overhaul on the Giants Causeway Line.

=== Great Southern Railways (1925–1944) and Córas Iompair Éireann (from 1945) ===
The GSR introduced just under sixty steam locomotives between 1925 and 1944, whilst CIÉ introduced one, the experimental Bulleid turf burner. CIÉ did however acquire 83 steam locomotives, which was precisely half of the Great Northern Railway stock, when that company was split between CIÉ and the Ulster Transport Authority after 30 September 1958.

J. R. Bazin (1925–1929)

- GSR Class 372 – also Class K1: Numbers 372–391 (R.E.L. Maunsell, imported in 1924)
- GSR Class 280 – also Class M1 (previous Class M1 became Class M2): numbers 280–281
- GSR Class 700 – also Class J15a: Numbers 700–704
- GSR Class 850 – also Class P1: Number 850

W. H. Morton (1929–1932)

- GSR Class 393 – also Class K1a: Numbers 393–398 (R.E.L. Maunsell, imported in 1924)
- GSR Class 495 – also Class M3: Number 495

A. W. Harty (1932–1937)

- GSR Class 670 – also Class I3: Numbers 670–674
- GSR Class 710 – also Class J15b: Numbers 710–719

Edgar Craven Bredin (1937–1942)

- GSR Class 800 – also Class B1a: Numbers 800–802

M. J. Ginnetty (1942–1944)

C. F. Tyndall (1944–1951)

O. V. S Bulleid (1951–1958)

- CIÉ No.CC1 Turf-burning locomotive

== Preserved locomotives ==
- List of steam locomotives in Ireland

== See also ==
- Diesel locomotives of Ireland
- Multiple units of Ireland
- Coaching stock of Ireland
- History of rail transport in Ireland
- Rail freight stock of Ireland

== Sources ==
- Ahrons, E. L. (1954). L. L. Asher (ed.). Locomotive and train working in the latter part of the nineteenth century. Vol. six. W Heffer & Sons Ltd.
- Clements, Jeremy & McMahon, Michael (2008). Locomotives of the GSR. Newtownards: Colourpoint Books. ISBN 978-1-906578-26-8.
- Haresnape, Brian; Rowledge, Peter (1982). Robinson Locomotives, a pictorial history. Shepperton: Ian Allan Publishing. ISBN 0-7110-1151-6.
- Rowledge, J. W. P. (1993). Irish Steam Locomotive Register. Stockport, Merseyside: Irish Traction Group. ISBN 0-947773-33-9.
