= DWWR 52 =

Irish class of locomotive

DW&WR 52–54
Type and origin
- Power type: Steam
- Designer: William Wakefield
- Builder: Sharp Stewart
- Serial number: 3909–3911
- Build date: 1893
- Total produced: 3
- Rebuilder: Grand Canal Street railway works & Inchicore railway works
- Rebuild date: 1913–1926
Specifications
- Configuration
  - Whyte: 4-4-2T
- Gauge: 5 ft 3 in (1,600 mm)
- Leading dia.: 3 ft 1 1/2 in (952 mm)
- Driver dia.: 5 ft 3 in (1,600 mm)
- Trailing dia.: 3 ft 9 in (1,140 mm)
- Length: 36 ft 7 in (11,150 mm)
- Axle load: 15.75 long tons (16.00 t)
- Loco weight: 55 long tons (56 t)
- Water cap.: 1,400 imp gal (6,400 L; 1,700 US gal)
- Boiler pressure: 160 lbf/in^{2} (1.10 MPa)
- Cylinders: 2
- Cylinder size: 18 in × 26 in (457 mm × 660 mm)
Performance figures
- Tractive effort: 17,050 lbf (75.84 kN)
Career
- Operators: DW&WR; DSER; GSR; CIÉ
- Class: C3 (Inchicore)
- Power class: N/MT
- Number in class: 3
- Numbers: 52(458), 53(460), 54(459)
- Locale: Ireland
- Withdrawn: 1953-1960
- Disposition: All scrapped

Dublin, Wicklow and Wexford Railway (DW&WR) 52 to 54 were a class of three 4-4-2T locomotives designed by William Wakefield for Kingstown Pier to Kingsbridge (Dublin Heuston) boat trains. At one point they carried the names Duke of Connaught, Duke of Abercorn and Duke of Leinster respectively.

== Service ==
Ahrons describes them as the larger than other types at the time of their introduction in 1893. They seem to have been generally well balanced and successful engines, though it was noted that they had a reverse level and could become problematic and even unsafe when worn. Unlike the subsequent Dublin and South Eastern Railway's (DSER) (Note: The Dublin, Wicklow and Wexford Railway was renamed the Dublin and South Eastern Railway in 1907.) 4-4-2Ts it had no apparent problems with trains on gradients. On the 1925 amalgamation to Great Southern Railways (GSR) in 1925 they became numbers 458, 460 and 459 of GSR Class 458/C3. In GSR rebuilt No. 460 with a lower pitched boiler and a forward cab extension, it being the only locomotive not re-boilered by the DSER. The last in service, No. 460, was withdrawn in 1960, the others having been withdrawn in the preceding decade.

A 1948 report for C.I.É. had assessed the engines as "DSER heavy passenger engines — quite good even with certain inherent troubles".
