= DWWR 13 =

Class of Irish 0-6-0 locomotives

DW&WR 13
Type and origin
- Power type: Steam
- Designer: R. Cronin
- Builder: Grand Canal Street; Beyer, Peacock & Company
- Build date: 1904–1910
Specifications
- Configuration
  - Whyte: 0-6-0
- Gauge: 5 ft 3 in (1,600 mm)
- Driver dia.: 5 ft 1 in (1,550 mm)
- Axle load: 13.85 long tons (14.07 t)
- Loco weight: 43.6 long tons (44.3 t)
- Water cap.: 2,600 imp gal (12,000 L; 3,100 US gal)
- Boiler pressure: 160 lbf/in^{2} (1.10 MPa)
- Cylinders: 2
- Cylinder size: 18 in × 26 in (457 mm × 660 mm)
Performance figures
- Tractive effort: 18,790 lbf (83.58 kN)
Career
- Operators: DW&WR; DSER; GSR; CIÉ
- Class: 442/J8 (Inchicore)
- Power class: C/E
- Number in class: 5
- Numbers: 13,14,18,65,66; 442-446 (GSR/CIÉ)
- Locale: Ireland
- Withdrawn: 1930-1957
- Disposition: All scrapped
- No. 13 As built

The DW&WR 13 was an 0-6-0 goods locomotive class built in 1904 at Grand Canal Street railway works for the Dublin, Wicklow & Wexford Railway and was followed by four more of the same class, two being contracted to Beyer, Peacock & Company.

== Design ==
These followed on from the 0-6-0s Nos. 17 and 36 built around the turn of the century but were more powerful and standardised. The first engine, No. 13 (Waterford) in 1904, and the last engine, No. 18 (Limerick) in 1910, both had large sliding cab sheets. The engines constructed in 1905, No. 14 (Enniscorthy) and the Beyer-Peacock pair Nos. 65 and 66 (Cork and Dublin) had large sliding cab windows. No. 18 which was constructed last after a gap in 1910 included some parts from the earlier 4-2-0 No. 18. Being excellent steamers with good ergonomics, suspension and ride they were generally liked by crews and a 1948 CIÉ report complimented them: DSER edition of Standard Goods (Class 101): quite good. Their successors, the Nos. 15 and 16 were originally meant to be enlarged version of this class but axle loading and the length of the Harcourt Street turntable led their designer Wild to a 260 mogul design that received the even more excellent report: One of the best Goods on the system, very powerful and reliable with low axleload. Unfortunately only two in class.

== Service ==
The main duties were goods services on the Wexford and Waterford via the DW&WR's route via Macmine junction which opened in 1905. They also handled the day goods from Waterford to Dublin and found occasional use on passenger services and excursions.

On the merger to the Great Southern Railways in 1925 there numbers were changed from 13, 14, 18, 65 and 66 to 442 through 446 respectively. While 442 was withdrawn in 1930 only 5 years after receiving a new boiler the remaining 5 locomotives lasted until 1955–1957 by which time CIÉ 1,200hp A and 500hp C diesels had been introduced.
