= DWWR 50 =

Two Irish tender locomotives

DW&WR 50
Type and origin
- Power type: Steam
- Designer: William Wakefield
- Builder: Vulcan Works
- Build date: 1891
- Rebuild date: 1912, 1915
Specifications
- Configuration
  - Whyte: 0-6-0
- Gauge: 5 ft 3 in (1,600 mm)
- Driver dia.: 5 ft 1 in (1,550 mm)
- Length: 33 ft (10 m) (est.)
- Loco weight: 39.5 long tons (40.1 t)
- Water cap.: 2,600 imp gal (12,000 L; 3,100 US gal)
- Boiler pressure: 150 lbf/in^{2} (1.03 MPa)
- Cylinders: 2
- Cylinder size: 18 in × 26 in (457 mm × 660 mm)
Performance figures
- Tractive effort: 18,850 lbf (83.85 kN)
Career
- Operators: DW&WR; DSER; GSR
- Class: J7 (Inchicore)
- Power class: E
- Number in class: 2
- Numbers: 50 (GSR 447), 51
- Locale: Ireland
- Withdrawn: 1925, 1930
- Disposition: Both scrapped

Dublin, Wicklow and Wexford Railway (DW&WR) 50 and 51 were two 0-6-0 tender locomotives built in 1891 at Vulcan Works and were named Arklow and New Ross respectively. These were the first the 0-6-0 wheel configuration to be purchased by the DW&WR. The DW&WR's own Grand Canal Street were to construct two more in 1899/1900 and to follow that with a design for five more from 1904. The DW&WR became the Dublin and South Eastern Railway (DSER) from the end of 1906. Under the locomotive engineer R. Cronin both engines were rebuilt with Belpaire boilers in 1912 and 1915 respectively and the boiler pressure increased to 160 lb.

The second engine No. 51 was deliberately destroyed in a head-on collision in the Irish Civil War. On 23 January 1923 New Ross was hauling the 6:30 am goods train from Waterford when a large force attacked the Palace East in County Wexford. The force organised a deliberate head-on collision with that of a cattle special from the opposite direction, which on that day, due to disruptions, was being hauled by the DSER's newest express passenger engine Rathcoole. Both engines were ultimately deemed unsalvagable.

The remaining engine passed to Great Southern Railways (GSR) on amalgamation in 1925 being allocated the new number 447 and a new class of 447/J7, being the only member of that class. Thenceforth it was mainly used for goods work on the Shillelagh branch line until withdrawal in 1930.
