= GNRI Class P =

Great Northern Railway of Ireland 4-4-0 steam locomotive class

Great Northern Railway Classes P & PP
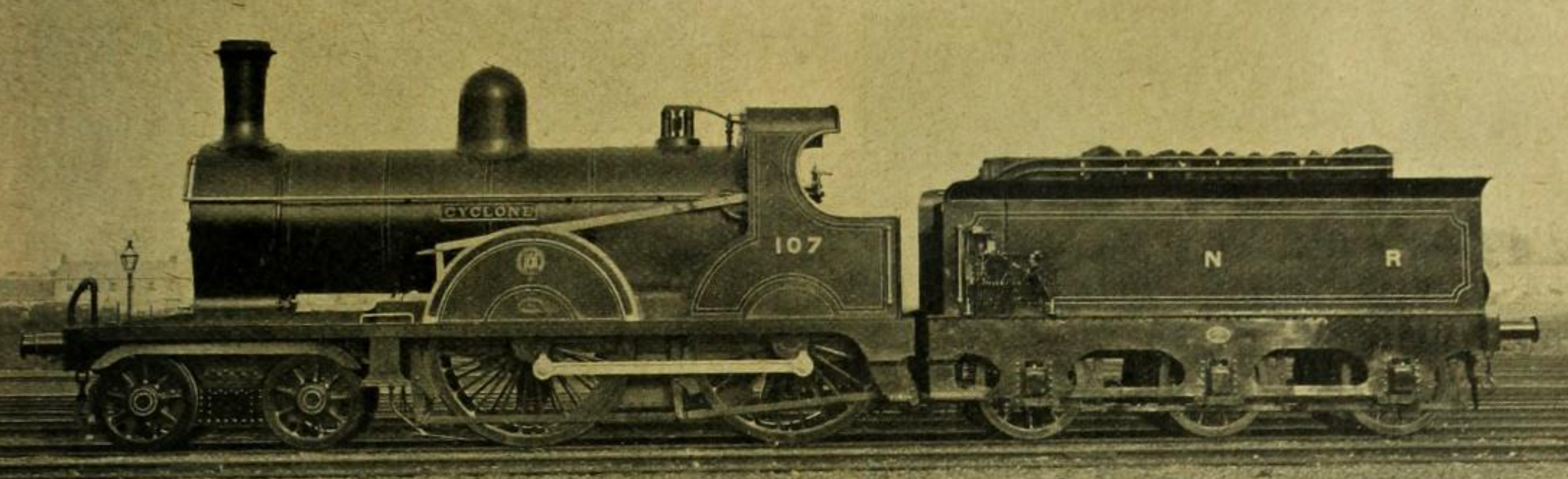
Type and origin
- Power type: Steam
- Designer: {J.C. Park; C. Clifford
- Build date: 1892(P); 1896(PP)
- Total produced: 29 (Note: Four Class P with 6' 7" wheels, and eight with 5' 7" wheels; Seventeen Class PP with 6' 7" wheels)
Specifications
- Configuration
  - Whyte: 4-4-0
- Gauge: 5 ft 3 in (1,600 mm)
- Driver dia.: 6 ft 7 in (2,007 mm); 5 ft 7 in (1,702 mm)
- Boiler pressure: 175 lbf/in^{2} (1,206.58 kPa)
- Cylinders: Two, inside
- Cylinder size: 17 in × 24 in (430 mm × 610 mm){P); 18 in × 24 in (460 mm × 610 mm)(PP)
- Train heating: steam
Performance figures
- Tractive effort: 13,840 lbf (61.56 kN)−15,340 lbf (68.24 kN)
Career
- Operators: GNR(I) → UTA → CIÉ
- Number in class: 29
- Numbers: 12, 25, 42–46, 50, 70–71, 74–77, 106–107, 129

Great Northern Railway Class P were two sets of 4-4-0 locomotives for the Great Northern Railway of Ireland (GNRI) introduced from 1892 by locomotive superintendent J.C. Park; four having 6 ft 7 in (2.01 m) driving wheels and eight having 5 ft 7 in (1.70 m) driving wheels. Park was succeeded by Charles Clifford who constructed 17 broadly similar locomotives from 1896 with 6 ft 7 in (2.01 m) driving wheels; these were designated Class PP. The last PP class survived until 1963.
