= MGWR Class E =

Steam locomotive

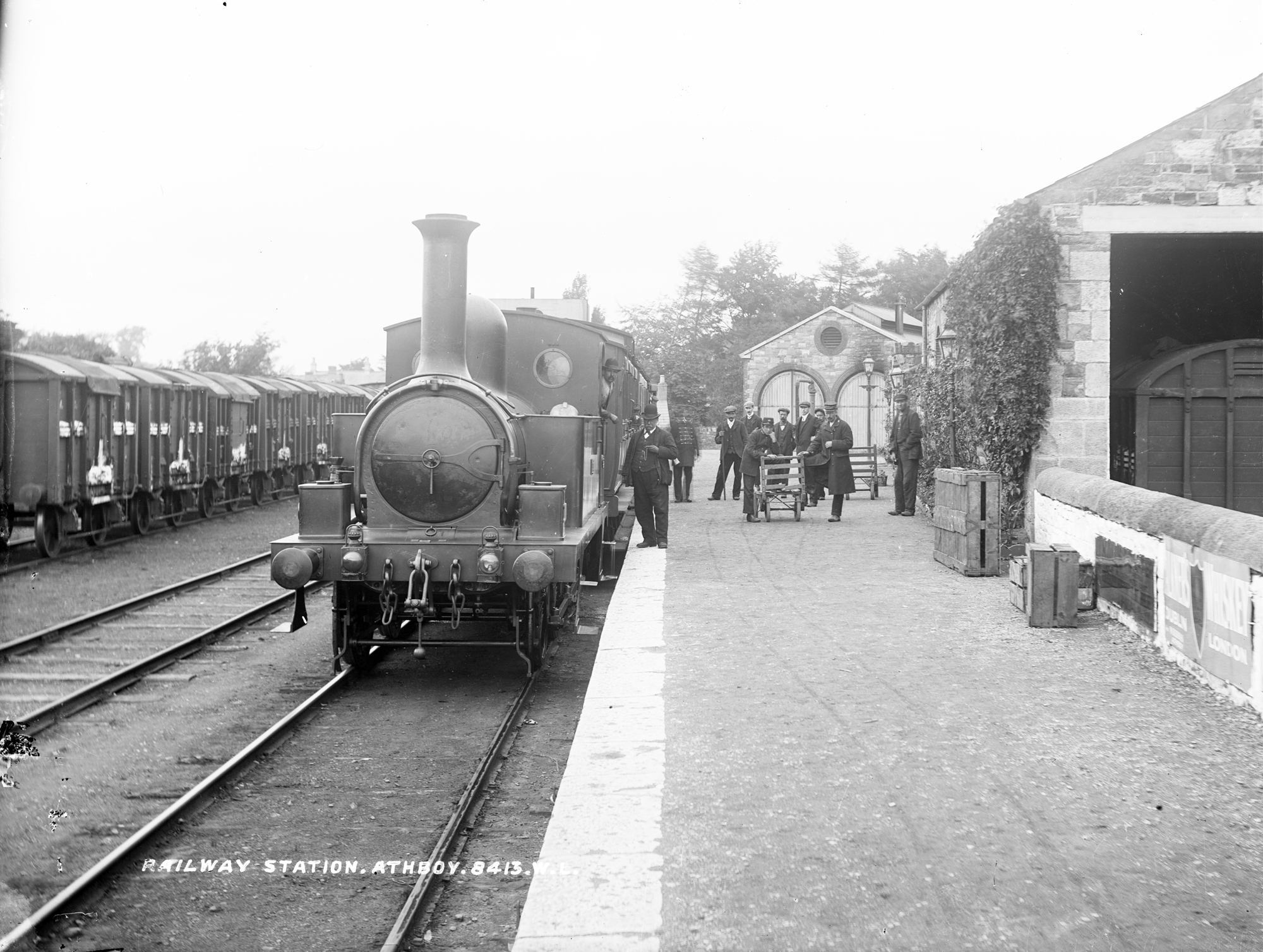
- MGWR Class E at Athboy, County Meath
Type and origin
- Power type: Steam
- Designer: Martin Atock
- Builder: Kitson and Company (9), Sharp, Stewart & Co. (3)
- Serial number: Kitson 3370–3372, 3380–3382, 3527–3329; Sharp, Stewart: 3693–3695
- Model: 1891–1893
- Total produced: 12
Specifications
- Configuration
  - Whyte: 0-6-0T
  - UIC: C n2t
- Gauge: 5 ft 3 in (1,600 mm)
- Driver dia.: 4 ft 6 in (1.372 m)
- Loco weight: 35 to 36.8 long tons (35.6 to 37.4 t)
- Fuel type: Coal
- Firebox
  - Grate area: 13 sq ft (1.2 m^{2})
- Boiler pressure: 150 psi (1.03 MPa)
- Heating surface
  - Firebox: 50 to 72 sq ft (4.6 to 6.7 m^{2})
  - Tubes: 667 sq ft (62.0 m^{2})
- Cylinders: Two, inside
- Cylinder size: 15 in × 22 in (381 mm × 559 mm)
Performance figures
- Tractive effort: 11,688 lbf (51.99 kN)
Career
- Operators: MGWR → GSR → CIÉ
- Class: MGWR: E GSR/CIÉ: 551 or J26
- Numbers: MGWR: 106–117; GSR: 551–562
- Official name: GSR Class 551 or Class J26
- Nicknames: Irish Terrier
- Withdrawn: 1954–1963
- Disposition: All scrapped

The MGWR class E was a small 0-6-0T steam locomotive class designed in 1891 by Martin Atock, the then locomotive superintendent of the Midland Great Western Railway (MGWR) and twelve engines were built. After the MGWR was merged into Great Southern Railways (GSR) in 1925 they were designated Class 551 or J26. They were also known as the Irish Terrier class.

== Locomotives ==
Class E locomotives
MGWR No.	MGWR Name	GSR No.
106	Lark	551
107	Robin	552
108	Swallow	553
109	Fly	554
110	Bat	555
111	Wasp	556
112	Hornet	557
113	Gnat	558
114	Stork	559
115	Achill	560
116	Cong	561
117	Moy	562

== Design and historical development ==
The MGWR Class E were initially intended for shunting around the Dublin Broadstone terminus. Further locomotives were ordered for rural and small branch line work around Killala, Achill, Clifden, Athboy and Kingscourt.

After the grouping of 1925, the Great Southern Railways classified them Class 551 or Class J26, and fitted them with new smokeboxes, safety valves and chimneys. The nameplates, builder’s plates and sandbox numbers were removed at this time and replaced with a numberplate.

After 1920 they were forced to move from the Achill branch when that became restricted for 6 wheel coupled locomotives.

Their low axle loading gave them good utility and they were often popular, though some duties stretched their abilities.

Three engines, 553, 555 and 560 were fitted with enlarged cabs and modified footsteps. This enabled an additional ton of coal to be carried and they successfully worked on the enclosed Waterford and Tramore section.

== Model ==
An etched-brass kit of the Class E / J26 has been produced by Studio Scale Models including brass etches and cast white metal parts.

== See also ==
- Diesel Locomotives of Ireland
- Multiple Units of Ireland
- Coaching Stock of Ireland
- Steam locomotives of Ireland
