= GNRI Class SG =

Class of two-cylinder 0-6-0 locomotives

GNR Class SG
Type and origin
- Power type: Steam
- Designer: Charles Gifford
- Builder: Beyer, Peacock & Company, Nasmyth, Wilson & Company
- Serial number: BP: 5633–5637, 5896–5900; NW: 1428–1432
- Build date: 1913, 1915, 1924–1925
- Total produced: SG: 5 SG2: 10
Specifications
- Configuration
  - Whyte: 0-6-0
  - UIC: C h2
- Gauge: 5 ft 3 in (1,600 mm)
- Driver dia.: 5 ft 1 in (1.549 m)
- Superheater: Schmidt
- Cylinders: Two, inside
- Cylinder size: 19 in × 26 in (483 mm × 660 mm)
- Valve type: 8-inch (203 mm) piston valves
Career
- Operators: Great Northern Railway; Ulster Transport Authority; CIÉ
- Withdrawn: 1959–1965
- Disposition: All scrapped

The Great Northern Railway (Ireland) SG and SG2 classes was one of the last designs of Charles Clifford. They were primarily intended for goods work, but the increased wheel diameter enabled effective passenger duties, managing heavy excursion trains with ease and speed.

Beyer, Peacock & Company built the first two batches in 1913 and 1915 and the 1924-25 batch were built by Nasmyth, Wilson & Company.

== Design ==
They were the first GNR designs to be fitted with Schmidt superheaters and 8-inch (203 mm) piston valves, the SG class having a re-designed motion with rocker arms as well as the first to have 5 ft 1 in (1.549 m) wheels instead of 4 ft 7 in (1.397 m).

Engines were originally built with flush riveted smokeboxes. After the first major overhaul, domed rivets were used. These locomotives originally ran with flared tenders, but at a later date 3,500 imperial gallons (16,000 L; 4,200 US gal) straight sided tenders were also used.

When first brought into service, the five SGs were originally numbered 137, 138, 37, 40 and 41. The last three were renumbered 47, 48, 49 and the whole series was finally renumbered 175, 176, 177, 178, 179.

== Differences ==
The major difference was in the brake rods of which there were two inboard of the wheels. The earlier SO and 562 locomotives had four pull-rods, the outer ones being outside of the wheels.

The 1915 batch (Classified 52 and 502) had direct motion, without rocker arms, driving inclined piston valves, and Robinson superheater. The only external difference was that the shaft and reversing rod were a little higher which resulted in the rear of the left hand side sandbox rod being inclined upwards from the centre sandbox back to the firebox.

The Wakefield mechanical lubricator was mounted further back on the 502. These locomotives were also fitted with Ross pop safety valves as built. The 1913 batch had lever safety valves changed to Ross pop type after first major overhaul after 10 years.

== CIÉ ownership ==
On the break-up of the GNR in 1958, Córas Iompair Éireann took over a number of these locomotives for a period of five years up to the end of steam on CIÉ. They were used particularly on the ex-Dublin and South Eastern Railway services to Wexford and Rosslare. CIÉ retained the GNR numbers, with suffix N except in the case of No.19, also ‘CIE’ was stencilled on the locomotive buffer beams. After withdrawal, some locomotives, including 15N, 179N, and 181N were kept in reserve by CIÉ, some until 1965.

Roster
| Class | Manufacturer | Serial No. | Date | GNR No. | 1958 Owner | 1958 No. | Withdrawn | Notes |
|---|---|---|---|---|---|---|---|---|
| SG | Beyer, Peacock & Company | 5633 | 1913 | 37 | CIÉ | 177N | 1963 | Renumbered 47 in 1913 and 177 later the same year |
| SG | Beyer, Peacock & Company | 5634 | 1913 | 40 | CIÉ | 178N | 1961 | Renumbered 48 in 1913 and 178 later the same year |
| SG | Beyer, Peacock & Company | 5635 | 1913 | 41 | CIÉ | 179N | 1963 | Renumbered 49 in 1913 and 179 later the same year |
| SG | Beyer, Peacock & Company | 5636 | 1913 | 137 | UTA | 43 | 1965 | Renumbered 175 in 1913 |
| SG | Beyer, Peacock & Company | 5637 | 1913 | 138 | UTA | 44 | 1965 | Renumbered 176 in 1913 |
| SG2 | Beyer, Peacock & Company | 5896 | 1915 | 180 | CIÉ | 180N | 1961 | |
| SG2 | Beyer, Peacock & Company | 5897 | 1915 | 181 | CIÉ | 181N | 1963 | |
| SG2 | Beyer, Peacock & Company | 5898 | 1915 | 182 | UTA | 41 | 1963 | |
| SG2 | Beyer, Peacock & Company | 5899 | 1915 | 183 | UTA | 42 | 1961 | |
| SG2 | Beyer, Peacock & Company | 5900 | 1915 | 184 | CIÉ | 184N | 1963 | |
| SG2 | Nasmyth, Wilson & Company | 1428 | 1924 | 15 | CIÉ | 15N | 1963 | |
| SG2 | Nasmyth, Wilson & Company | 1431 | 1924 | 18 | UTA | 38 | 1965 | |
| SG2 | Nasmyth, Wilson & Company | 1429 | 1925 | 16 | UTA | 39 | 1965 | |
| SG2 | Nasmyth, Wilson & Company | 1430 | 1925 | 17 | UTA | 40 | 1961 | |
| SG2 | Nasmyth, Wilson & Company | 1432 | 1925 | 19 | CIÉ | — | 1959 | |

== Model ==
The SG Class is currently available as a 00 gauge etched-brass kit from Studio Scale Models. It includes transfers, brass etches, most nameplates and cast white metal parts.
