= GNRI Class PG =

Irish locomotive class

Great Northern Railway Classes PG, QG, QLG and QNG
Type and origin
- Power type: Steam
- Designer: C. Clifford
- Serial number: 10,11,100−103,151 (PG); 152-155 (QG); 119, 158-165 (QLG); 38, 39, 112 (GNQ)
- Build date: 1899—1911
- Total produced: 28
Specifications
- Configuration
  - Whyte: 0-6-0
- Gauge: 5 ft 3 in (1,600 mm)
- Driver dia.: 4 ft 7 1/4 in (1,403 mm)
- Loco weight: 39 long tons 14 cwt (88,900 lb or 40.3 t)—49 long tons 0 cwt (109,800 lb or 49.8 t)
- Boiler pressure: 175 lbf/in^{2} (1,206.58 kPa)
- Cylinders: Two, inside
- Train heating: steam
Performance figures
- Tractive effort: 19,880 lbf (88.43 kN)−24,065 lbf (107.05 kN)
Career
- Operators: GNR(I) → UTA → CIÉ
- Number in class: 28

Great Northern Railway Classes PG, QG, QLG and QNG (Note: There are variations in the class designations, sometimes LQG is used for QLG for example) were a series of 0-6-0 freight locomotives introduced from 1899 by Charles Clifford.

== History ==
The PG class was introduced in December 1899 by Charles Clifford with 4 feet 7 inches (1.40 m) driving wheels and 18 1/2 by 24 inches (47 cm × 61 cm) cylinders. The QG's introduced in 1904 were 1 foot 6 inches (0.46 m) longer than the PG with 18 1/2 by 26 inches (47 cm × 66 cm) cylinders weighed in 2 tons heavier. The key changed with the QLG class introduced in 1906 was a 4 feet 9 inches (1.45 m) wide boiler.
