= DWWR 15 =

Railway locomotive (1860)

DW&WR 0-4-2
Type and origin
- Power type: Steam
- Designer: Haughton / William Meikle
- Builder: Sharp Stewart
- Build date: 1860, 1864, 1876
Specifications
- Configuration
  - Whyte: 0-4-2
- Gauge: 5 ft 3 in (1,600 mm)
- Driver dia.: 5 ft 1 1/2 in (1,562 mm)
- Trailing dia.: 3 ft 7 1/2 in (1,105 mm)
- Axle load: 9.15 long tons (9.30 t)
- Loco weight: 26.15 long tons (26.57 t)
- Water cap.: 1,600 imp gal (7,300 L; 1,900 US gal)
- Boiler pressure: 150 lbf/in^{2} (1.03 MPa)
- Cylinders: 2
- Cylinder size: 16 in × 24 in (406 mm × 610 mm)
Performance figures
- Tractive effort: 12,740 lbf (56.67 kN)
Career
- Operators: DW&WR; DSER
- Number in class: 12 (Note: Different numbers were carried at times including 15A, 19, 20, 20A and 48; the sources are not completely clear)
- Numbers: 15–23, 37–39
- Locale: Ireland
- Withdrawn: 1923-1925
- Disposition: All scrapped
- Refers to No. 15

Dublin, Wicklow and Wexford Railway (DW&WR) 15 of 1860 was the first of a number of 0-4-2 tender locomotives built by Sharp Stewart who were the only supplier of the 0-4-2 type to the DW&WR. In total 12 were supplied in batches in 1860, 1864 and 1876.

== Technical details ==
Locomotives other than Nos. 15, 16 and possibly 37 differed, being about two tons heavier with 17 in × 24 in (432 mm × 610 mm) cylinders, driving wheels of 4 ft 9 in (1,450 mm) and other differences giving a tractive effort of 15,520 lbf (69.04 kN).

== Service ==
The 0-4-2 was considered a mixed-traffic type. In practice the DW&WR mostly employed the locomotives with the higher tractive effort on main line freight and the others on mixed passenger/freight trains.

The 0-4-2s began to be made obsolete by the introduction of types such as the 0-6-0 and 2-6-0 in 1895, 1900 and 1922.

At least three were damaged beyond economic repair during the Irish Civil War, although there may be some claims some were simply life-expired. L One was still using a 4-wheel tender when withdrawn in 1923. When the Dublin and South Eastern Railway (DSER) (Note: The DW&WR was renamed the Dublin and South Eastern Railway (DSER) in 1906) Upon grouping into the Great Southern Railways most DSER were inspected or considered at Inchicore. The resulting immediate cull of over twenty of the DSER's 67 locomotives included all remaining six or seven remaining 0-4-2 engines including the Civil War losses.
