= BNCR Class N =

Class of two-cylinder 0-4-0ST locomotives

Type and origin
- Power type: Steam
- Builder: Sharp, Stewart & Co., Manchester (No. 42); NCC, York Road Works, Belfast (No. 16)
- Build date: 1874 (No. 42); 1914 (No. 16)
- Total produced: 2
Specifications
- Configuration
  - Whyte: 0-4-0ST
  - UIC: B n2t
- Gauge: 5 ft 3 in (1,600 mm)
- Driver dia.: 4 ft 0 1/8 in (1.222 m)
- Wheelbase: 7 ft 9 in (2.36 m)
- Length: 25 ft 3 1/8 in (7.70 m)
- Width: 8 ft 4 in (2.54 m)
- Height: 11 ft 11 in (3.63 m)
- Axle load: 13.80 long tons (14.02 t)+ 17.25 long tons (17.53 t)
- Loco weight: 31.05 long tons (31.55 t)
- Fuel type: Coal
- Fuel capacity: 15 long cwt (760 kg)
- Water cap.: 600 imp gal (2,700 L; 720 US gal)
- Boiler pressure: 130 psi (896 kPa)
- Heating surface
  - Firebox: 70.24 sq ft (6.526 m^{2})
  - Tubes: 590.88 sq ft (54.895 m^{2})
  - Total surface: 661.12 sq ft (61.420 m^{2})
- Cylinders: Two
- Cylinder size: 16 in × 22 in (406 mm × 559 mm)
- Valve gear: Stephenson
- Loco brake: No.42: Hand brake No.16: Steam brake
- Train brakes: None
Performance figures
- Tractive effort: 12,707 lbf (56.5 kN)
- Factor of adh.: 5.47
Career
- Operators: BNCR; NCC; UTA
- Numbers: 16, 42
- Nicknames: No.16: Donkey
- Scrapped: No.16: 1951; No.42: 1925

The Belfast and Northern Counties Railway (BNCR) Class N was a class of 0-4-0ST dock engines that worked on the Belfast Harbour Commissioners' lines in north-east Ireland. No.42 was the first of the class and was built by Sharp, Stewart and Company in 1874. A second, similar engine, No.16, was built by the MR (NCC) in 1914.

== History ==
=== No.42 ===
The opening of the Belfast Central Railway in 1872 led to an increase in railway freight along the Belfast quays. The BNCR ordered an 0-4-0 saddle tank locomotive from Sharp, Stewart and Company in Manchester to work the traffic. This engine, works number 2444, was delivered in 1874. It was numbered 42 in the BNCR's stock.

No.42 had outside cylinders and was to remain the only outside cylinder locomotive on the NCC for forty years, until it was joined by No.16 in 1914. Steam was admitted to the cylinders by outside steam pipes mid-way along the smokebox. Lubrication to the cylinders was by cylinder taps mounted over the cylinders.

The drive was on the trailing wheels and the slide bars were attached to a motion bracket just behind the leading wheels. The wheels themselves had twelve spokes and very large balance weights. The front pair of wheels of the engine were partially enclosed in splashers which did not come above the running plate.

One peculiar feature of the engine was the extreme forward placement of the dome on the first ring of the boiler. The chimney was built up in three pieces and placed at the very front of the smokebox.

Immediately behind the smokebox was a cylindrical sand box; sanding, which was by hand, was provided in front of the leading wheels and behind the rear ones since the engine worked as much backwards as forwards. On the saddle tank, which extended from the front of the smokebox to the front of the firebox, was a Sharp Stewart maker's plate.

The buffer beams were of wood – a common practice in 1874 – and the buffers themselves had almost rectangular heads. Jacks were carried as was common practice on all BNCR engines at this time.

When No.42 first appeared, it was equipped only with a weatherboard and the locomotive crew must have found the lack of a proper cab very unpleasant in wet weather. The Ramsbottom safety valves were placed over the firebox and exhausted in front of the weatherboard.

No brakes, other than a hand brake actuated by a large hand-wheel, were fitted to No.42. This, the fireman was expected to work under the driver's commands.

No.42 was rebuilt in 1901 with a cab which enclosed the safety valves that now exhausted through the cab roof. The spectacles were small and round and the cab sides were quite open. This alteration increased the weight by about 1 ton.

The makers plate was removed at some time during its career, possibly when the engine was rebuilt.

No.42 was well suited for dock shunting. A relatively high tractive effort for a four coupled engine of 1874 vintage was packed into a total wheelbase of 7 ft 9 in (2.36 m), ideal for the tight dockyard curves.

No.42 was scrapped in June 1925.

=== Dock working ===
To reach the quays, No.42 had first to pass over a short tramway from the BNCR goods yard to the Belfast Harbour Commissioners' tramway. To accomplish this feat required three persons to drive and conduct her, and if more than two wagons were attached, a fourth to look after them. Two of these people were equipped with red flags. While on the tramway her driver was not allowed to sound the whistle, open the cylinder drain taps or allow the engine to blow off. The maximum speed was to be three miles per hour.

Having got on to the Harbour Commissioners' tramway she was still not allowed to blow off or to have the cylinder drain taps opened. The maximum permitted load was 24 wagons or 12 on Donegall Quay. One other rather peculiar regulation forbade her from being closer than 15 yards (14 m) to any other train approaching or preceding her on the same line of rails.

Apart from shunting the quays and goods yard, No.42's main duty was to go down to Albert Quay and bring up loads of locomotive coal.

=== No.16 ===
No.42 must have been considered successful because the NCC built another similar engine in 1914 in their own works at York Road, Belfast. This was numbered No.16 and for many years was nicknamed the Donkey. In many ways it was a replica of No.42 and with similar leading dimensions except that throughout its life a cab was fitted, recessed at the spectacle plate to allow for the safety valves, which in this case were of the Ross "pop" type. The spectacles were larger than those of No.42 and rectangular rather than round.

The cab controls were similar to those on No.42 except that a steam brake was provided in addition to the hand brake. The regulator handle was of the normal vertical type but later a long horizontal piece was secured to it, enabling it to be operated from either side.

During its career on the NCC, No.16 ran a total of 705 696 miles, which was calculated on a basis of 5 mph (8.0 km/h) average. No.16 was scrapped in September 1951.

== Livery ==
During BNCR ownership, the colour of the engine is believed to have been a dark laurel green lined out in vermilion/light blue/chrome yellow with the initials "BNCR" painted on the cab side sheets

When the Midland Railway took control, the engines were painted "invisible green" (a very dark bronze green that looked almost black) with lining that appears to have been the same as in BNCR days. The initials "MR" replaced the BNCR ones.
