= GNRI Class U =

Class of two-cylinder 4-4-0 locomotives

Great Northern Railway (Ireland) class U
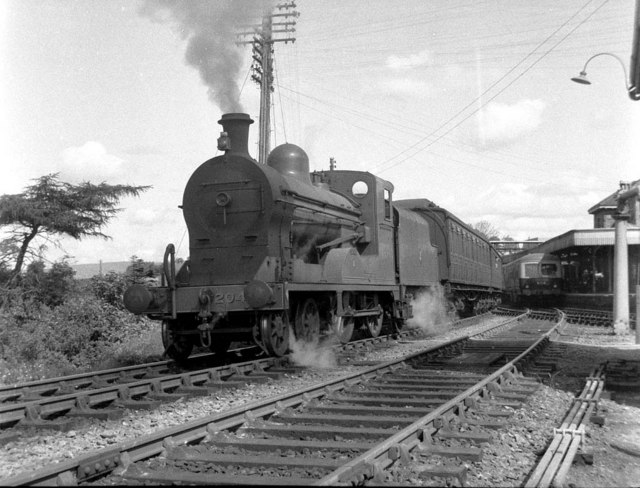
- 204 Antrim on a passenger train leaving Omagh, 7 June 1957
Type and origin
- Power type: Steam
- Designer: George Glover
- Builder: Beyer, Peacock & Company
- Serial number: 5904-8, 7244-8
- Build date: 1915 (5), 1947 (5)
- Total produced: 10
Specifications
- Configuration
  - Whyte: 4-4-0
  - UIC: 2′B h2
- Gauge: 5 ft 3 in (1,600 mm)
- Driver dia.: 5 ft 9 in (1.753 m)
- Fuel type: coal
- Boiler pressure: 175 psi (1.21 MPa)
- Cylinders: Two, inside
- Cylinder size: 18 in × 24 in (457 mm × 610 mm)
Performance figures
- Tractive effort: 16,763 lbf (74.6 kN)
Career
- Operators: GNR(I); UTA; CIÉ
- Class: U
- Numbers: 196–205
- Delivered: 1915, 1948
- First run: 1915
- Last run: 1965
- Withdrawn: 1959–1965
- Scrapped: 1959, 1961-1965
- Disposition: All scrapped

The GNR(I) class U was a class of 4-4-0 steam locomotives built for the Great Northern Railway (Ireland).

== History ==
Five were built by Beyer, Peacock & Company in 1915. The class was so successful that an additional batch of five was built in 1947, making them the last inside-cylinder 4-4-0 locomotives to be manufactured anywhere in the world. They retained the Edwardian appearance of their previous counterparts.

The earlier locomotives were initially unnamed. However, after the later locomotives were delivered with names of counties along the GNR(I) route, the earlier locomotives received names of Loughs.

== Withdrawal ==
All were still in service in 1958 when the GNR(I) was divided between the Ulster Transport Authority (UTA) and Córas Iompair Éireann (CIÉ), with each receiving five locomotives.

No. 198 Lough Swilly was the first to be withdrawn in 1959 before its CIÉ number (198N) was applied. CIÉ withdrew steam traction in 1963, whereas the UTA withdrew their U class fleet between 1961 and 1965. None of the class were preserved.

== Fleet list ==
BP serial No.	Date	GNR(I) No.	Name	Named	1958 owner	1958 No.	Withdrawn	Notes
5904	1915	196	Lough Gill	1953	UTA	64	1961	
5905	1915	197	Lough Neagh	1949	CIÉ	197N	1962	
5906	1915	198	Lough Swilly	1950	CIÉ	—	1959	198N allocated, but not applied
5908	1915	199	Lough Derg	1949	CIÉ	199N	1963	
5907	1915	200	Lough Melvin	1950	UTA	65	1961	
7244	1948	201	Meath	New	UTA	66	1965	
7245	1948	202	Louth	New	UTA	67	1965	
7246	1948	203	Armagh	New	CIÉ	203N	1962	
7247	1948	204	Antrim	New	CIÉ	204N	1963	
7248	1948	205	Down	New	UTA	68	1965	

== Model ==
An 00 gauge model of No. 205 Down is currently available as an etched-brass kit from Studio Scale Models. It includes transfers, brass etches and cast white metal parts.
