= MGWR Class P =

Class of 5 Irish 0-6-0T locomotives

MGWR P class
Type and origin
- Power type: Steam
- Designer: Martin Atock
- Builder: Broadstone
- Build date: 1880-1890
- Total produced: 5
Specifications
- Configuration
  - Whyte: 0-6-0T
- Gauge: 5 ft 3 in (1,600 mm)
- Driver dia.: 4 ft 6 in (1,370 mm)
Career
- Operators: Midland Great Western Railway (MGWR); Great Southern Railways (GSR); CIÉ
- Number in class: 6
- Numbers: MGWR 100-103, 105; GSR 614-618
- Nicknames: Heavy Tanks
- Locale: Ireland
- Withdrawn: 1949-1959

The Midland Great Western Railway (MGWR) Class P were an 0-6-0T tank locomotive designed by Martin Atock introduced in 1881 designed for shunting and banking round North Wall freight yard. After 1925 they became Great Southern Railways (GSR) class 614 / Inchicore class J10.

== Fleet ==
MGWR No.	Name	Built	GSR No.	Withdrawn
100	Giantess	1880	614	1955
101	Giant	1880	615	1951
102	Pilot	1880	616	1950
103	Pioneer	1880	617	1959
105	Hercules	1890	618	1949

The MGWR P class were known as Heavy Tanks. In particular No. 102 was rebuilt with armour-plating in 1922 and was unofficially known as King Tutenkamen.
