= BCDR 4-6-4T =

Steam locomotive class of Ireland

Type and origin
- Power type: Steam
- Builder: Beyer, Peacock & Company
- Build date: 1920
- Total produced: 4
Specifications
- Configuration
  - Whyte: 4-6-4T
  - UIC: 2′C2′ht
- Gauge: 5 ft 3 in (1,600 mm)
- Driver dia.: 5 ft 6 in (1.68 m) (Note: Patterson & Rowledge claim the driver diameter was 5ft 9in, Bookcock claims 5ft 6in)
- Loco weight: 81.6 long tons (82.9 t; 91.4 short tons)
- Fuel type: Coal
- Boiler: G8AS
- Boiler pressure: 170 psi (1.17 MPa)
- Cylinders: Two (outside)
- Cylinder size: 19 in × 26 in (483 mm × 660 mm)
- Valve gear: Walschaerts
Performance figures
- Tractive effort: 19,340 lbf (86.03 kN)
Career
- Operators: Belfast & County Down Railway; Ulster Transport Authority
- Number in class: 4
- Numbers: 22–25 → 222–225 (UTA)
- Nicknames: Baltics
- Last run: 1953

The Belfast and County Down (BCDR) 4-6-4 T were a class of four 6-coupled tank locomotives built by Beyer, Peacock & Company in 1920. Generally reliable and well-liked but with mediocre performance, they spent their lives on the Queen's Quay, Belfast to Bangor until withdrawal in the early 1950s. These were the only class of 4-6-4T wheel arrangement to work on Ireland's broad gauge lines. The County Donegal Joint Railway Committee's Class 4 used the same arrangement on narrow gauge.

== History ==
At the end of World War I, the BCDR needed more powerful locomotives, and the directors were impressed by the LB&SCR L class express tank engines used on the London to Brighton line. Petterson thus ordered locomotive superintendent R. G. Miller to construct a class of similar engines. When the locomotives arrived in 1920 from Beyer, Peacock & Company they were inherited by Miller's successor Crossthwait. The BCDR locomotives were smaller than their English basis, with 19 in × 26 in (483 mm × 660 mm) cylinders and 5 ft 9 in driving wheels compared to 22 in × 28 in (559 mm × 711 mm) cylinders and 6 ft 9 in driving wheels. Despite this, at over 81 tons the locomotives were noted for being very heavy.

Numbered 22 to 25, they were allocated to heavy commuter trains on the 12 1/4 miles (19.7 km) Belfast Queen's Quay to Bangor line. (Note: There was a trail train to Ballynahinch when they first arrived and one was noted working in the former Northern Counties Committee network c.1953.) In service, the class was reliable but performance was mediocre and coal consumption was very high. Boocock has described them as "handsome" and "well-liked" and suggests the problem may have been due to short-travel piston valves rather than drafting.

The BCDR was absorbed into the Ulster Transport Authority (UTA) on 3 September 1948, and the class was renumbered 222 to 225. Class WT 2-6-4T tank engines were transferred to the Bangor line from summer 1949 and their performance was substantially better, after which they began to replace the BCDR engines. With the introduction of UTA MED diesel railcars, the Bangor line lost all steam working by 1953. Only one worked past 1952, with No. 222 surviving (Note: Boocock says No. 222 did not work after 1953 whereas Patterson does not specify a date but his prose suggests a later date.) on the former Northern Counties Committee network with the remainder being withdrawn at Queen's Quay sidings. All were ultimately scrapped in 1956.
