= GS&WR Class 37 =

Class of 6 Irish 4-4-2T locomotives

GS&WR 37 Class
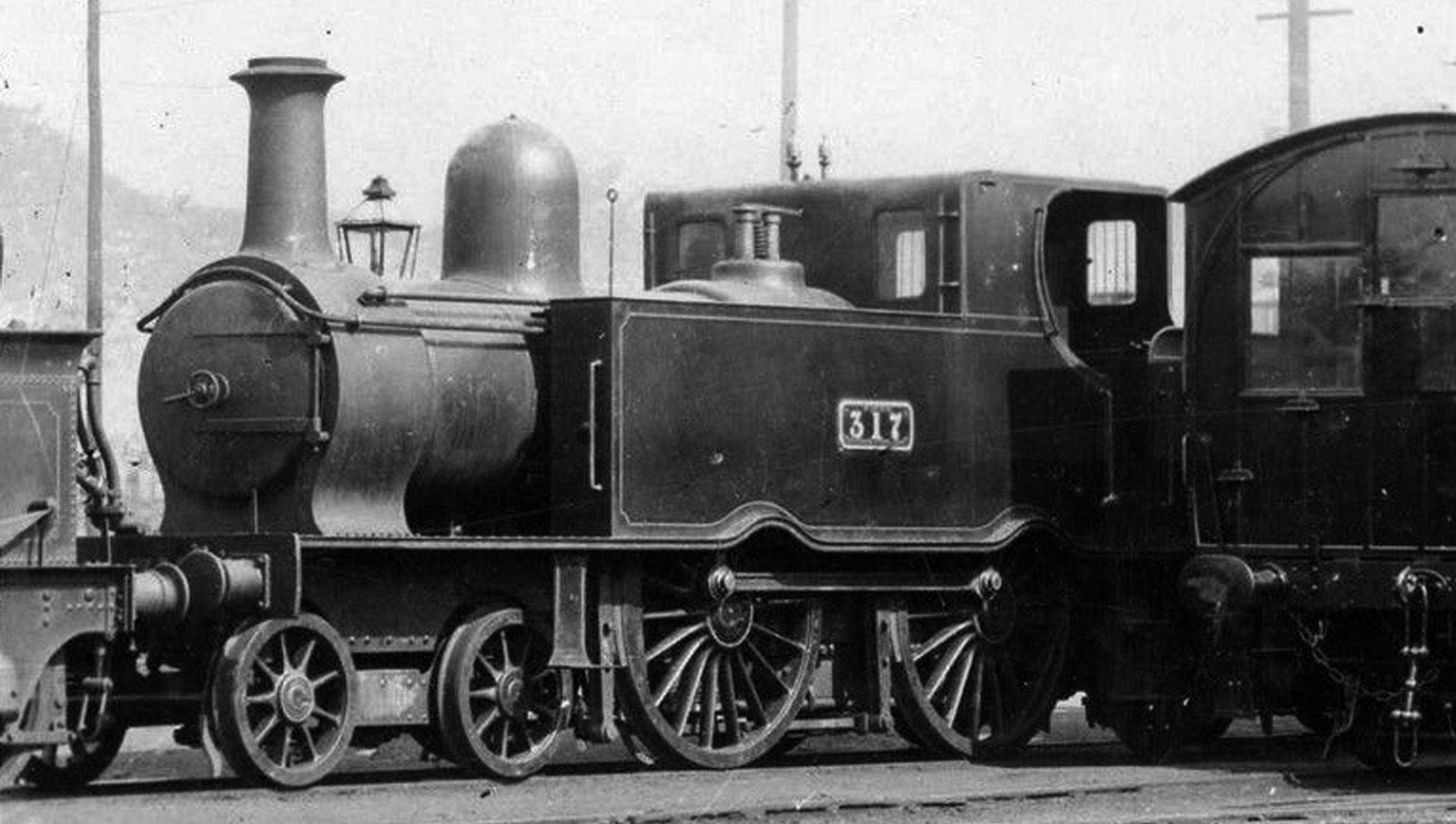
- 4-4-2T No. 317 partially hidden behind a railmotor
Type and origin
- Power type: Steam
- Designer: H. Ivatt / Coey
- Builder: Inchicore
- Build date: 1894 & 1901
- Total produced: 6
Specifications
- Configuration
  - Whyte: 4-4-2T
- Gauge: 5 ft 3 in (1,600 mm)
- Leading dia.: 3 ft 0 in (910 mm)
- Driver dia.: 5 ft 8 1/2 in (1,740 mm)
- Trailing dia.: 3 ft 9 in (1,140 mm)
- Length: 34 ft 1 3/4 in (10,408 mm)
- Axle load: 12.5 long tons (12.7 t)
- Loco weight: 48.5 long tons (49.3 t)
- Water cap.: 1,130 imp gal (5,100 L; 1,360 US gal)
- Boiler pressure: 160 lbf/in^{2} (1.10 MPa)
- Cylinders: 2
- Cylinder size: 16 in × 20 in (406 mm × 508 mm)
Performance figures
- Tractive effort: 9,530 lbf (42.39 kN)
Career
- Operators: GS&WR; GSR; CIÉ
- Class: C7 (Inchicore)
- Number in class: 6
- Numbers: 37–38, 317–320
- Locale: Ireland
- Withdrawn: 1955
- Disposition: All scrapped
- Details for No. 37 as built

The Great Southern and Western Railway (GS&WR) Class 37 consisted of six 4-4-2T tank engines. The first two built by locomotive superintendent Henry Ivatt (Snr.) were based on a previous 2-4-0T design by McDonnell, as were some 2-4-2Ts Ivatt produced two years earlier for the Kerry branches.

== Construction ==
In 1900 Robert Coey, who by then had been promoted Inchicore Railway Works Manager to locomotive superintendent, produced four of a heavier and more powerful 4-4-2T, these were known as Class 27.

Robert Coey in 1902 produced four more of the lighter class built by Ivatt, these were to be the final passenger tanks built by the GS&WR.

== Design ==
The Class 37 had a very low 13 long tons 6 cwt (29,800 lb or 13.5 t) maximum axle load enabling a very high route availability. By contrast the Class 27 had a higher maximum axle load 15 long tons 10 cwt (34,700 lb or 15.7 t).

== Service ==
On the amalgamation to Great Southern Railways in 1925 some of these classes were allocated to the former Dublin and South Eastern Railway (DSER) services to Bray, where there was a shortage of motive power at least in part due to the ravages of the Irish Civil War. By the 1930s most have been allocated to the Cork local services.

By 1948 the type was regarded as obsolete but all lasted until the 1950s with the last withdrawn in 1955.
