= MGWR Class W =

Class of 6 Irish 0-6-0 locomotives

MGWR W Class GSR 222/234 Classes
Type and origin
- Power type: Steam
- Designer: John G. Robinson
- Builder: Kitson
- Build date: 1897–1901
- Total produced: 6 (4 WLWR) 2 (MGWR)
Specifications
- Configuration
  - Whyte: 0-6-0
- Gauge: 5 ft 3 in (1,600 mm)
- Driver dia.: 5 ft 2 in (1,570 mm)
Career
- Operators: Midland Great Western Railway (MGWR); Waterford, Limerick and Western Railway (WLWR); Great Southern and Western Railway (GSWR); Great Southern Railways (GSR); CIÉ
- Number in class: 6
- Numbers: WLWR/GSWR 2, 56–58; MGWR 233/234; GSR 222, 233, 234 237–239
- Locale: Ireland
- Withdrawn: 1929–1951
- Disposition: All scrapped

The Great Southern Railways (GSR) 222/234 Classes 0-6-0 originated from 2 batches of 3 locomotives built for the Waterford, Limerick and Western Railway (WLWR) by Kitson with a contract payment dispute resulting in the final two members going to Midland Great Western Railway becoming MGWR Class W.

== Fleet ==
WLWR No.	MGWR No.	Name	Built	GSWR/GSR No.	GSR Class	Inchicore Class	Withdrawn
2	–	Shannon	1900	222	222	J25	1949
(4 allocated)	141	Limerick	1901	233	234	J17	1929
(11 allocated)	142	Athenry	1901	234	234	J17	1950
56	–	Thunderer	1897	237	222	J25	1951
57	–	Cyclops	1897	238	222	J25	1934
58	–	Goliath	1897	239	222	J25	1949

== History ==
This class was a set of 2 batches of 3 locomotives for the WLWR designed by John G. Robinson. The lead member of the second batch, No. 2, was notable as the first Irish broad gauge locomotive to have a Belpaire firebox from new and the first to have the long slender chimney set to become synonymous with Robinson locomotives. The final two of the batch were held back on a payment dispute issue from the WLWR amalgamation into the GSWR in 1901 and opportunely purchased by the MGWR in the meanwhile. The locomotives were the first on the MGWR to have Belpaire firebox.

Upon the 1901 amalgation the WLWR locomotives were renumbered 222, 237, 238 and 239 and retained those numbers with the merger into the Great Southern Railways (GSR) in 1925. All four were rebuilt to the same specification in the period 1924–1924 and became GSR Class 222. These locomotives were used on goods traffic in the Waterford, Limerick and Tuam area. As of 1948 it was considered their maximum haulage load was 8 wagons less than the GSR standard goods.

The MGWR locomotives were based at Mullingar and typically used on goods to Cavan and Longford. MGWR locomotive 141 seemed slated for early withdrawal leaving 142 to become the only member of GSR Class 234. By 1938 this remaining locomotive has become based at Sligo.
