= Steam railmotors of Ireland =

Steam rail transport type in Ireland

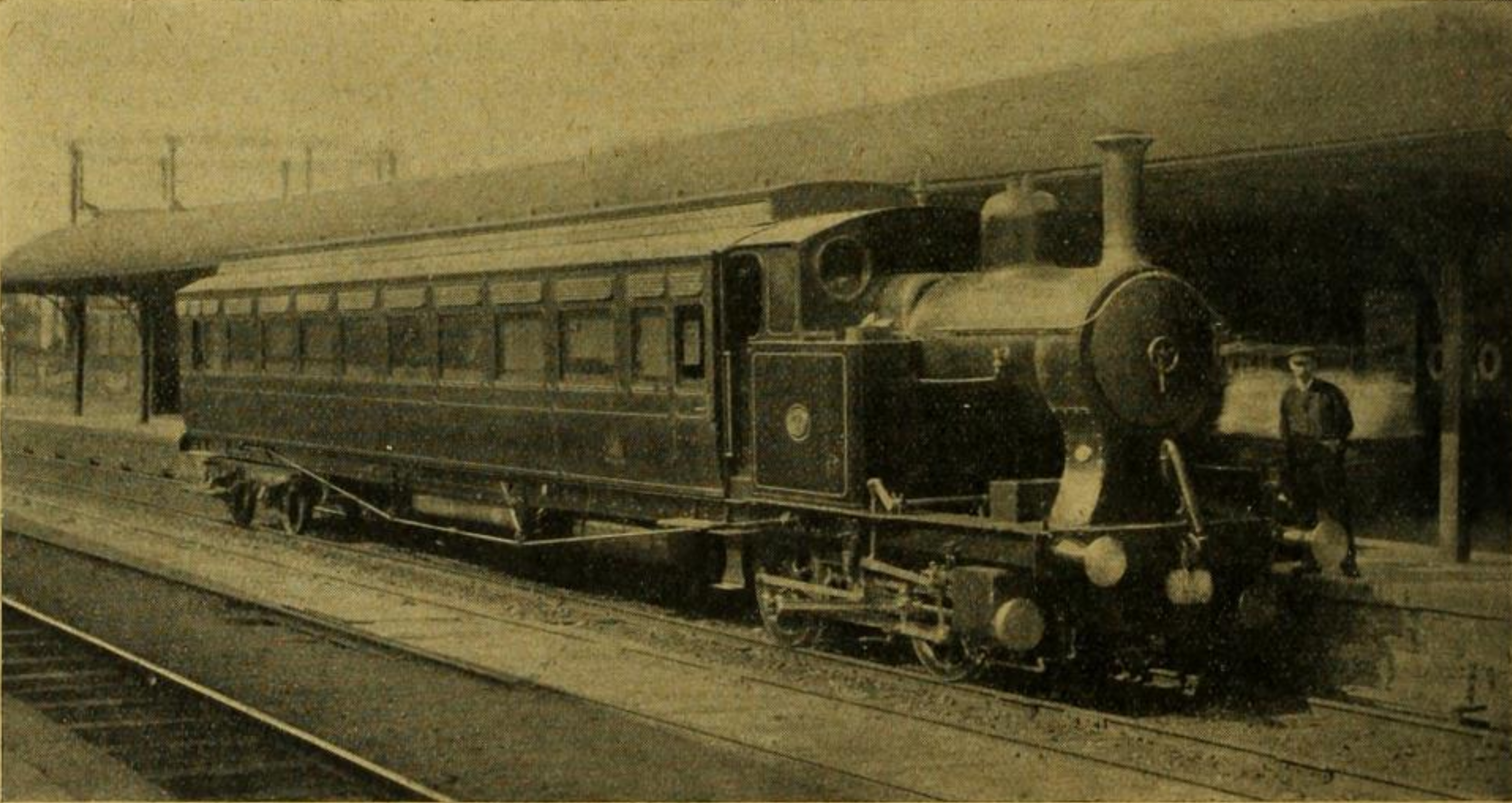
Belfast and County Down Railmotor No. 3

A steam railmotor or steam railcar is a carriage (railcar) that is self powered by a steam engine,

== Operating Companies ==
=== Belfast and County Down ===
The Belfast and County Down Railway introduced three railmotors c.1905 which lasted in service until 1918.

=== Dublin Wicklow and Wexford Railway ===
The Dublin, Wicklow and Wexford Railway had two steam railmotors, built by Manning Wardle.

=== Great Northern Railway ===
The Great Northern Railway of Ireland operated seven steam railmotors acquired c.1906.

=== Great Southern and Western Railway ===
The Great Southern and Western Railway purchased a single steam railmotor in 1905.

=== Great Southern Railways ===
Great Southern Railways initially introduced four steam railmotors, Nos. 354 to 357, from Sentinel in 1927 which were withdrawn in 1941–2. These were followed by six from Clayton in 1928, which were relatively unsuccessful and withdrawn in 1932 though the carriage portions were converted into three articulated non-powered pairs which remained in service until 1955.

=== Northern Counties Committee ===
The Northern Counties Committee obtained two new steam railmotors in 1905.
