= Cork & Bandon 0-6-0 Beyer saddle tank =

Former steam locomotive class

C&BR Beyer–Peacock saddle tank GSR Class 475
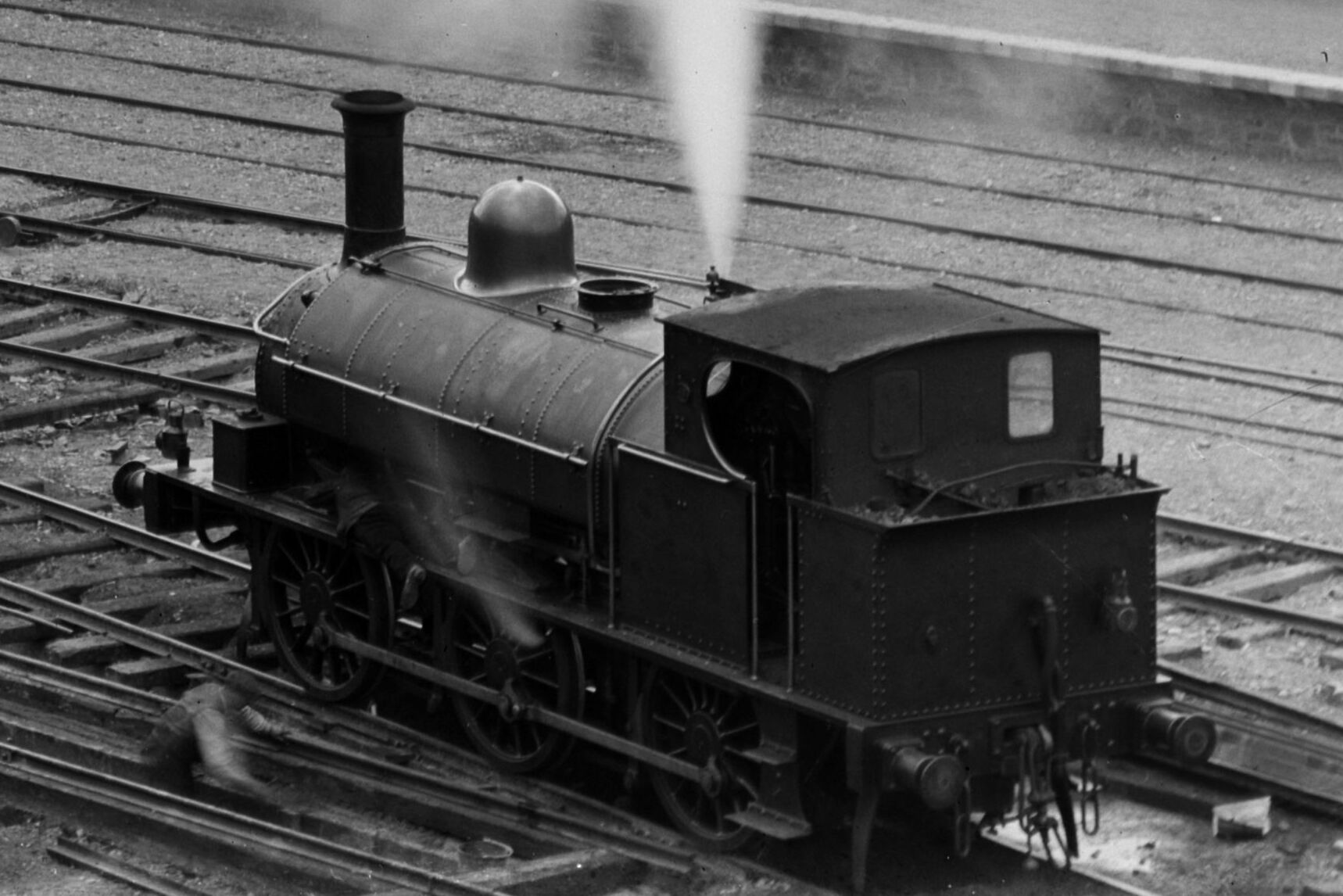
Type and origin
- Power type: Steam
- Builder: Beyer, Peacock & Company
- Serial number: 2046, 2156, 2902, 3288, 2629
- Build date: 1881–1894
- Total produced: 5
- Rebuild date: 1922
- Number rebuilt: 1
Specifications
- Configuration
  - Whyte: 0-6-0ST
- Gauge: 5 ft 3 in (1,600 mm)
- Driver dia.: 4 ft 6 in (1,372 mm)
- Axle load: 12 long tons 10 cwt (28,000 lb or 12.7 t)
- Loco weight: 35 long tons 15 cwt (80,100 lb or 36.3 t)
- Fuel type: Coal
- Fuel capacity: 1 long ton 0 cwt (2,200 lb or 1 t)
- Water cap.: 850 imp gal (3,900 L; 1,020 US gal)
- Firebox
  - Grate area: 14 sq ft (1.3 m^{2})
- Boiler pressure: 140 psi (0.97 MPa)
- Heating surface
  - Firebox: 77 sq ft (7.2 m^{2})
  - Tubes: 823 sq ft (76.5 m^{2})
- Cylinders: Two
- Cylinder size: 17 in × 24 in (432 mm × 610 mm)
Performance figures
- Tractive effort: 15,290 lbf (68.01 kN)
Career
- Operators: Cork and Bandon Railway; → Cork, Bandon and South Coast Railway; → Great Southern Railways
- Class: Inchicore: J21/J23/J24
- Number in class: 5
- Numbers: C&BR:5, 6, 12, 15, 16; GSR: 472–476
- Withdrawn: 1925–1940
- Preserved: None
- Disposition: All scrapped Notes: Figures are for No. 6 as built, other class members haver differences.

The Cork & Bandon 0-6-0 Beyer saddle tank was a class of five six-coupled locomotives supplied to the Cork and Bandon Railway (C&BR) (later Cork, Bandon and South Coast Railway — CB&SCR) between 1881 and 1894 by Beyer, Peacock & Company. They were, for a short while on introduction, to be the railway's principle motive power.

== History ==
From 1864, in what Shepherd describes as the C&BR's "second phase" of locomotive procurement, the C&BR had elected to predominately to purchase second-hand engines, with arguably results being less than successful overall. Johnson, the C&BR's engineer, chose a different strategy by ordering a 0-6-0ST from BP; this being derived from their works No. 2131 design supplied to multiple British colleraries, the latter also being developed into the BP "3064" class which was widely sold across Europe and to the London and South Western Railway 330 class.

At the time of their introduction, they became the prime motive power of the Railway, displacing 2-4-0T types that had previously fulfilled this role.

When the CB&SCR was amalgamated to the Great Southern Railways in 1924–5 the locomotives were allocated new numbers: from 5, 6, 12, 16, and 17 to 475, 472, 474, 476, and 473 respectively. The GSR was to withdraw 474 and 476 immediately; 472, 473 and 475 being allocated different class numbers J24, J22 and J21 on the basis of all three having slightly different wheel diameters. The original engine, No. 6/475 had been rebuilt in 1922 and was the last to be withdrawn in 1940.

After withdrawal, No. 475 was used for boiler washouts at Broadstone, Dublin until being scrapped in 1945; No. 472 was also used the same way at Inchicore before it too was scrapped.

The CB&SCR turned to 4-4-0T and 4-6-0T types as its principal engines in the 1900s; a project with two 0-6-2ST purchased from Baldwin Locomotive Works (the first purchase in Ireland of an American locomotive) being unsuccessful due to operational problems.

== Design ==
The five locomotives were supplied over a 13-year period and ordered by 3 separate engineers, Conran(2), Johnston(1), and Johnston's son(2); the result being a number of design differences. The first, No. 6, had Ramsbottom valves until rebuilt in 1922 with Salter valves like the remainder. The first and last, nos. 6 and 17, possessed 4 ft 6 in (1,372 mm) diameter wheels as opposed to 4 ft 5 in (1,346 mm) on no. 12 and 4 ft 3 in (1,295 mm) on the other two. There were also variations in bunkers, cabs, and external boiler fittings. The class, as supplied, had a sloped smokebox door.

== Fleet ==
CB&SCR 0-6-0ST Beyer Peacock Fleet
CB&SCR#	GSR#	Works#	Class	Built	Withdrawn	Notes
5	475	2902	J21	1887	1939	
6	472	2046	J24	1881	1940	Rebuilt 1922
12	474	2156	J23	1882	1925	
16	476	3288	J21	1890	1925	
17	473	3629	J24	1894	1935	
