= MGWR Class L =

Class of Irish 0-6-0 locomotives

MGWR Classes L, Lm and Ln
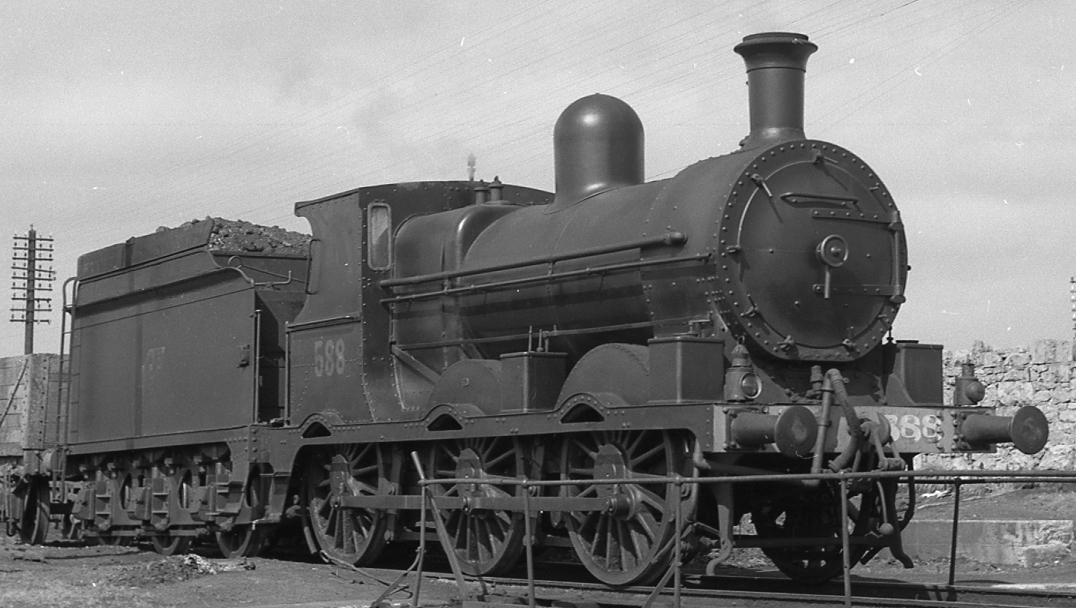
- CIÉ 588 class J18 at Athlone in July 1959
Type and origin
- Power type: Steam
- Designer: Martin Atock
- Builder: Robert Stephenson and Company, Broadstone (MGWR), Kitson and Company, Sharp, Stewart & Co.
- Build date: 1876-1895
Specifications
- Configuration
  - Whyte: 0-6-0
- Gauge: 5 ft 3 in (1,600 mm)
Career
- Operators: MGWR; GSR; CIÉ
- Official name: MGWR Classes L, Lm & Ln; GSR Classes 563, 573 & 594
- Nicknames: GSR J16, J18 & J19
- Retired: 1963
- Withdrawn: 1965

The MGWR Class L/Lm/Ln were Midland Great Western Railway (MGWR) 0-6-0 locomotives. Following merger of the MGWR into the Great Southern Railways (GSR) in 1925 these locomotives still generally kept to their former area, as did the equivalent GS&WR Class 101 standard goods to their former area. Whereas Class 101 was noted for some working of branch line passenger trains this was less likely for the MGWR class L; however they were noted for passenger mixed working on the Clifden and Ballaghaderreen branch lines.

== Class L ==
MGWR Class L became GSR Class 594 or J19.

The first orders were made from R. Stephenson in 1875, the order subsequently being increased to 10 and all were delivered in 1876. A further 18 were built between 1886 and 1889. The original 10 were rebuilt as class Lm between 1893 and 1895. Of the remaining 18 one was withdrawn in 1925, the remainder surviving until 1957 with two only being withdrawn in 1965.

== Class Lm ==
MGWR Class Lm became GSR Class 573 or J18.

Twenty two Class Lm were built between 1891 and 1895. They were joined by the 10 original MGWR Class L which were rebuilt as to Class Lm between 1893 and 1895. Of the ten conversions all but one were withdrawn between 1923 and 1928, 575 being the exception which had two further rebuilds and lasted until withdrawal in 1957. Of this group only four were actually allocated GSR numbers including 573 which while never actually carrying that number before withdrawal became the subject of the class number. Of the 22 originally built as Class Lm one was an Irish Civil War loss in 1925, and five were withdrawn in 1925/6 before carrying their allocated GSR numbers. The remainder survived until at least 1955 with 593 only being withdrawn in 1965. The two locomotives 612 and 613 were a slight exception as their 1925 rebuild was to Class L (594/J19) standard, though rebuilds in the 1940s brought them back to J18 proper.

== Class Ln ==
Seven Class Ln were built between 1879 and 1880 utilising parts from earlier locomotives, notably 5' 1½" driving wheels, a difference from the 5' 3" wheels of class L. All were rebuilt in 1899. No. 53 Duke was fitted with an experimental Morton-Cusask Superheater in 1919. Upon integration into the GSR in 1925 as class J16 or 563 MGWR Number 53 Duke was renumbered 567 and rebuilt with a Schmidt superheater whilst the remaining 6 engines were withdrawn over the next 3 years without carrying their GSR number. This engine remained the sole class member, now known as J16 or 567 and was fitted with a type X boiler in 1942. The locomotive was withdrawn in 1950.

== Gallery ==
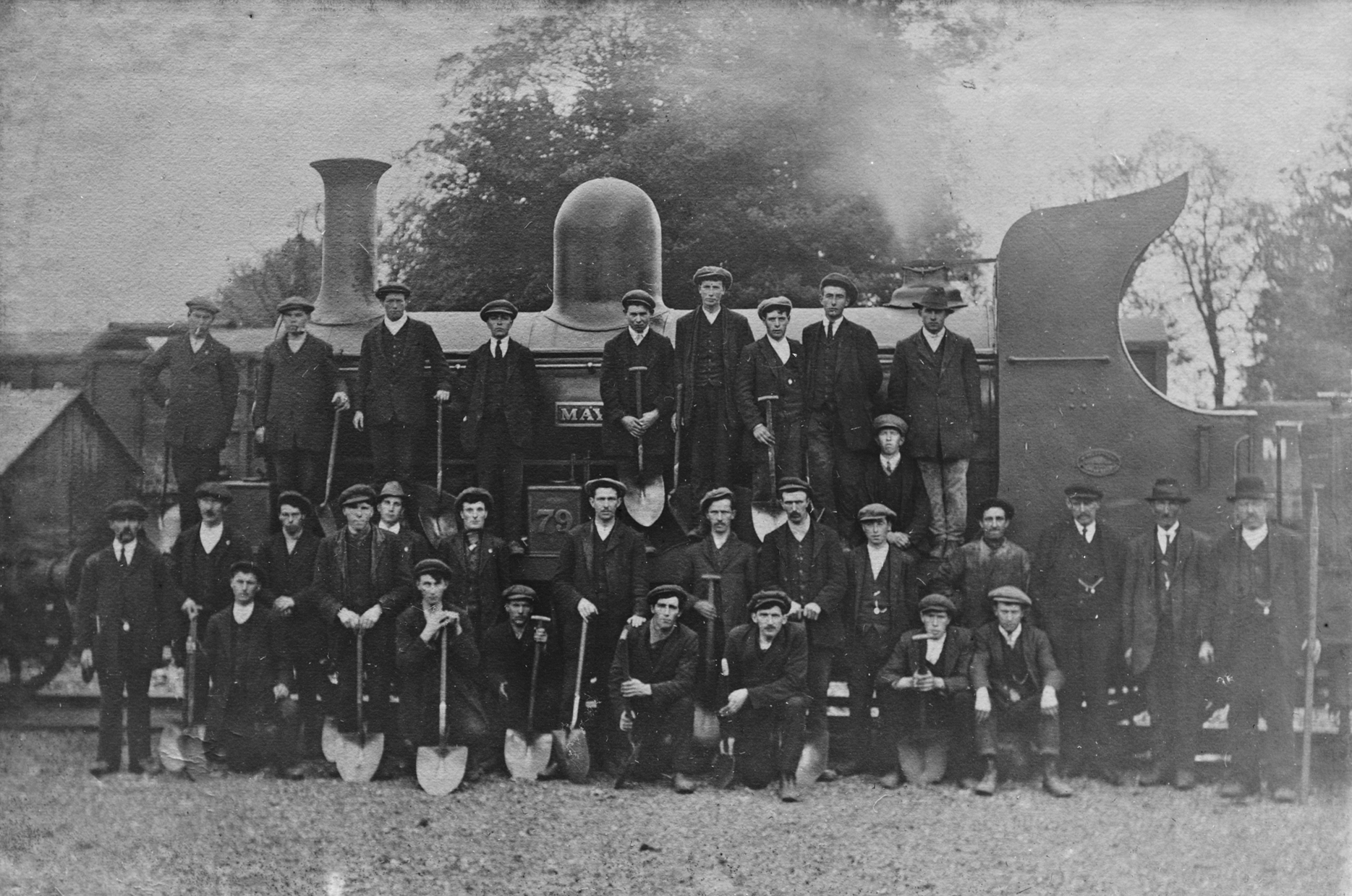
Railway workers with MGWR Class Lm No. 79 'Mayo' with distinctive Atock 'fly away' cab originally fitted to these locomotives

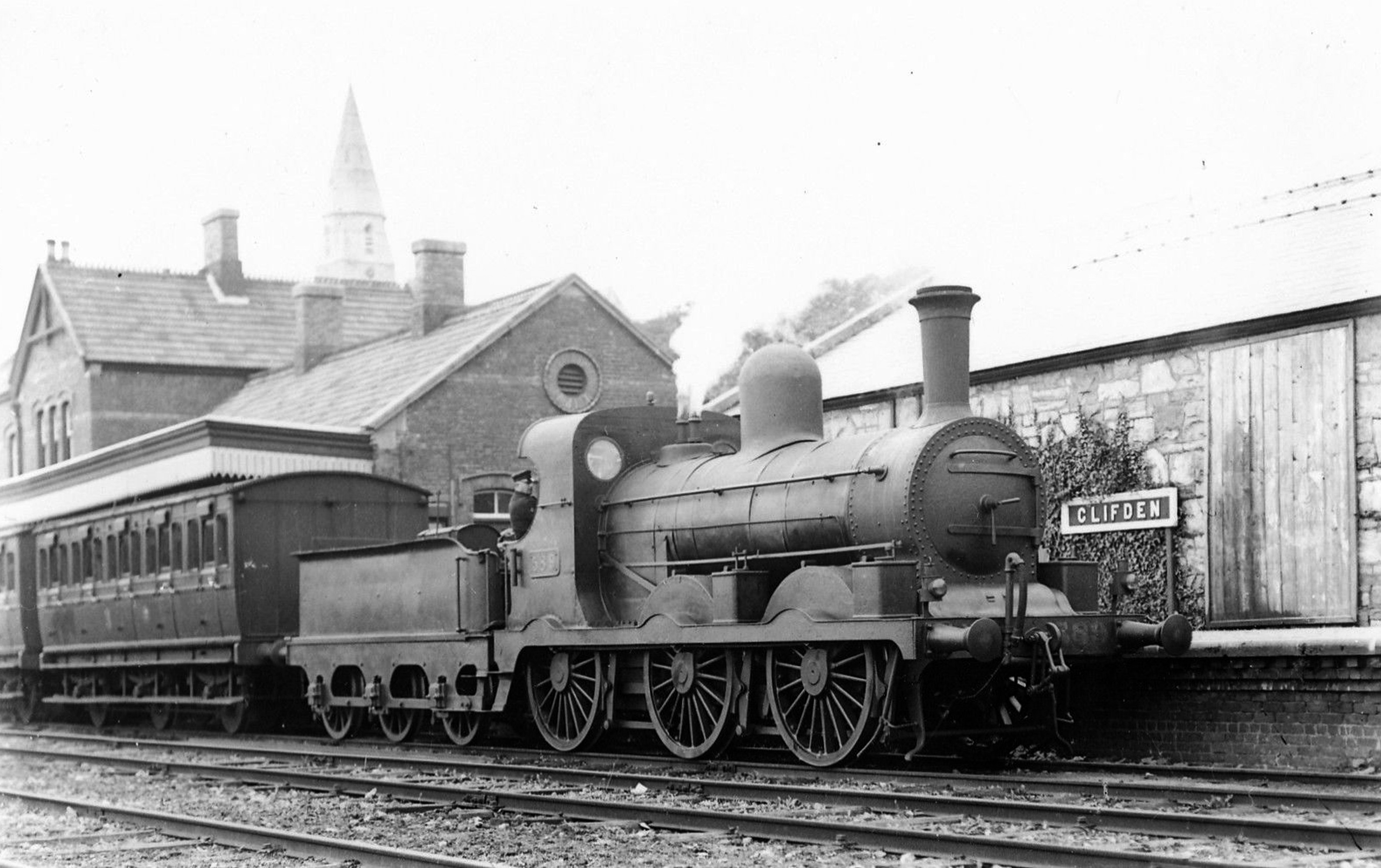
No. 589 at Clifden before its 1941 rebuild with a Belpaire boiler and with wheel arch access cut-outs.
