= GS&WR Class 33 =

Class of 6 Irish 2-4-2T locomotives

GS&WR 33 Class
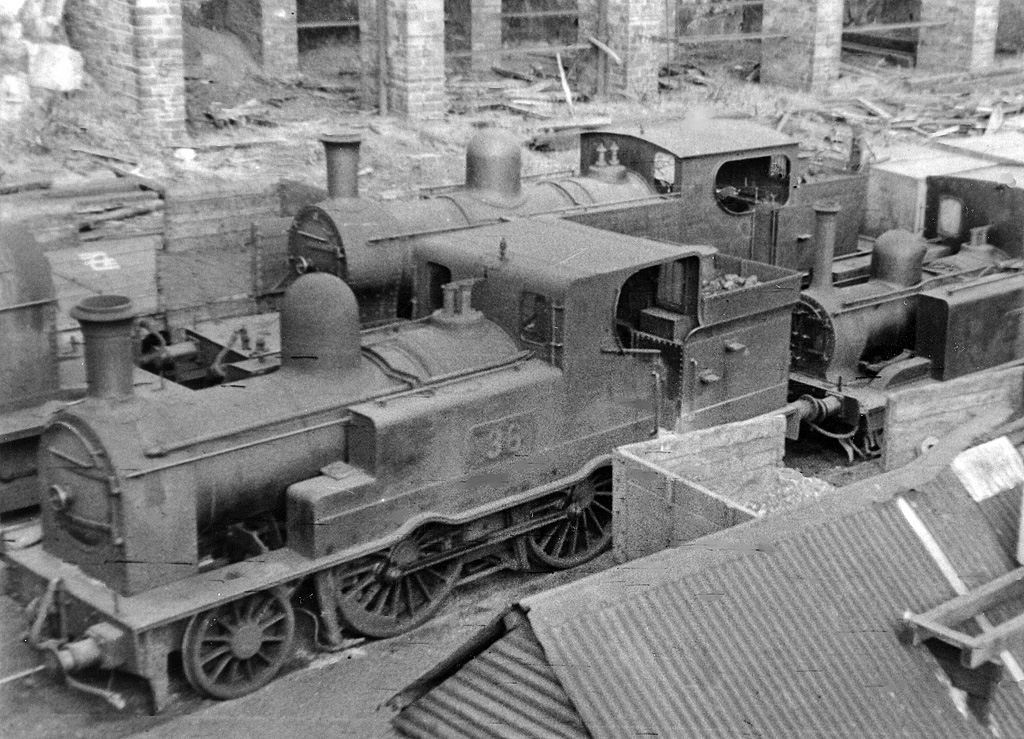
- No. 36 stored at Rockferry
Type and origin
- Power type: Steam
- Designer: Henry Ivatt
- Builder: Inchicore
- Build date: 1892—1894
- Total produced: 6
Specifications
- Configuration
  - Whyte: 2-4-2T
- Gauge: 5 ft 3 in (1,600 mm)
- Leading dia.: 3 ft 9 in (1,140 mm)
- Driver dia.: 5 ft 8 1/2 in (1,740 mm)
- Trailing dia.: 3 ft 9 in (1,140 mm)
- Length: 30 ft 11 1/2 in (9,436 mm)
- Axle load: 12.65 long tons (12.85 t)
- Adhesive weight: 25.1 long tons (25.5 t)
- Loco weight: 46.6 long tons (47.3 t)
- Water cap.: 1,250 imp gal (5,700 L; 1,500 US gal)
- Boiler pressure: 150 lbf/in^{2} (1.03 MPa)
- Cylinders: 2
- Cylinder size: 16 in × 20 in (406 mm × 508 mm)
Performance figures
- Tractive effort: 9,530 lbf (42.39 kN)
Career
- Operators: GS&WR; GSR; CIÉ
- Class: F6 (Inchicore)
- Number in class: 6
- Numbers: 33—36, 41—42
- Locale: Ireland
- Withdrawn: 1963

The GS&WR) Class 33 consisted of six 2-4-2T locomotives designed by Henry Ivatt for Kerry branch line services, especially tight radius curves of the branches to Kenmare and Valencia.

Numbers 33 and 42 were subsequently fitted with a bell for working the Cork City Railways. In their final years the class was mainly working in the Cork area, At the end of steam in the 1959 number 42 was to be found in the Dublin area.
