= DSER 20 =

Irish class of locomotive

DSER 20, 34 & 35
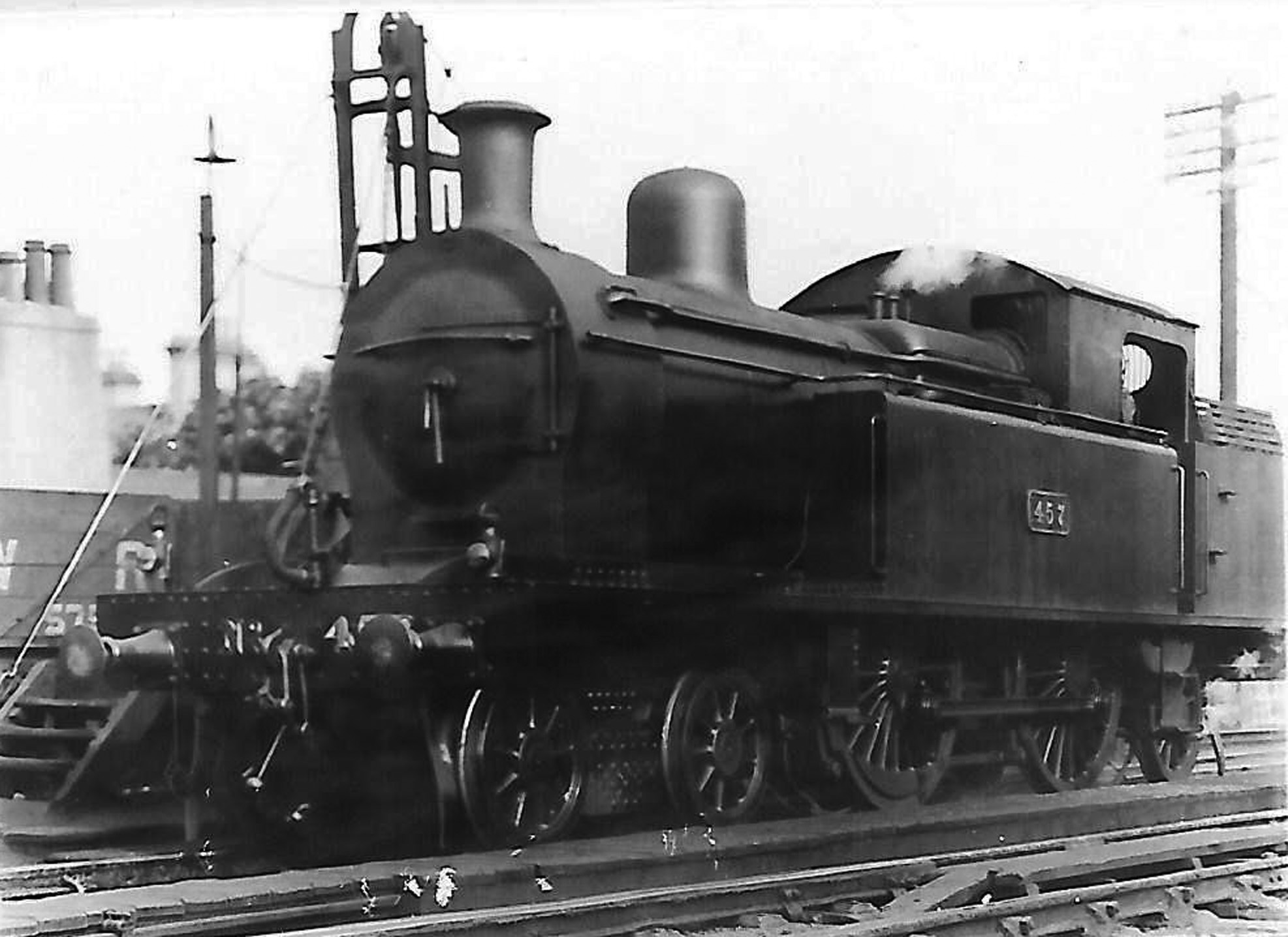
- 457 (former DSER 35) at Bray
Type and origin
- Power type: Steam
- Designer: Cronin
- Builder: Grand Canal Street; Beyer, Peacock & Company
- Build date: 1911 & 1924
- Total produced: 3
- Rebuilder: Inchicore railway works
- Rebuild date: 1932–1951
Specifications
- Configuration
  - Whyte: 4-4-2T
- Gauge: 5 ft 3 in (1,600 mm)
- Leading dia.: 3 ft 3 in (990 mm)
- Driver dia.: 6 ft 1 in (1,850 mm)
- Trailing dia.: 3 ft 39 in (1,900 mm)
- Axle load: 15.75 long tons (16.00 t)
- Loco weight: 61.5 long tons (62.5 t)
- Water cap.: 1,700 imp gal (7,700 L; 2,000 US gal)
- Boiler pressure: 160 lbf/in^{2} (1.10 MPa)
- Cylinders: 2
- Cylinder size: 18 in × 26 in (457 mm × 660 mm)
Performance figures
- Tractive effort: 15,920 lbf (70.82 kN)
Career
- Operators: Dublin and South Eastern Railway; Great Southern Railways; CIÉ Railways Division
- Class: C2 (Inchicore)
- Power class: K/HT
- Number in class: 3
- Numbers: 20, 34, 35; 455-457
- Locale: Ireland
- Withdrawn: 1955-1959
- Disposition: All scrapped
- No. 20 as built

The DSER 20 class was a class of three 4-4-2T locomotives operated by the Dublin and South Eastern Railway and later the Great Southern Railways and CIÉ.

== History ==
Designed by Cronin for the Dublin and South Eastern Railway, they were intended for express passenger work. No. 20 King George was the last locomotive to be built at Grand Canal Street railway works though the boiler was made by Kitson & Company. The remaining locomotives, numbered 34 and 35, were built by Beyer, Peacock & Company in 1924.

It is suggested the design might have arisen as an attempt to emulate the success of the LB&SCR I3 class, however on introduction engine No. 20 seemed to have issues with high axle loading restricting the route and it also appeared to have difficulties with heavier trains, steep gradients and hot axleboxes. The relatively large driver wheel diameter of 6 feet 1 inch (1,850 mm) may not have helped especially as it ended up being used on suburban services, only averaging a mere 90 miles (140 km) a day. It may have been hoped the Belpaire boilers, increased weight and other changes on those ordered from Beyer, Peacock & Company in 1924 may have helped.

Upon merger of the DSER with the Great Southern Railways in 1925, they were allocated the numbers 455 though 457 and Inchicore class C2. Rebuilds in the 1930s seem to have resolved most of the issues and a 1948 CIÉ report commented: "DSER heavy passenger engines. (When) (sic.) well maintained not all that bad. Essential to local service".
