= GS&WR Sambo =

GS&WR Class L2
Type and origin
- Power type: Steam
- Designer: Richard Maunsell
Specifications
- Configuration
  - Whyte: 0-4-2ST
  - UIC: B1 nt
- Gauge: 5 ft 3 in (1,600 mm)
Career
- Operators: GS&WR → GSR
- Nicknames: Sambo
- Delivered: 1912
- Scrapped: 1962

The GS&WR Class L2 Sambo was an 0-4-2 saddle tank engine used by the GSR of Ireland. It worked at Inchicore Works for most of its life. The original "Sambo" model before the L2 was a rebuild of an old Wakefield locomotive, but in 1912, Richard Maunsell had a new locomotive built as a saddle tank. It was rebuilt with smaller buffers, back cab wall, and new smokebox door sometime between 1942 and 1964. In 1962, it was replaced by E421 and G611 diesels, then transitioned to Broadstone Railway Station. The engine was sent for scrap in the mid-1960s.

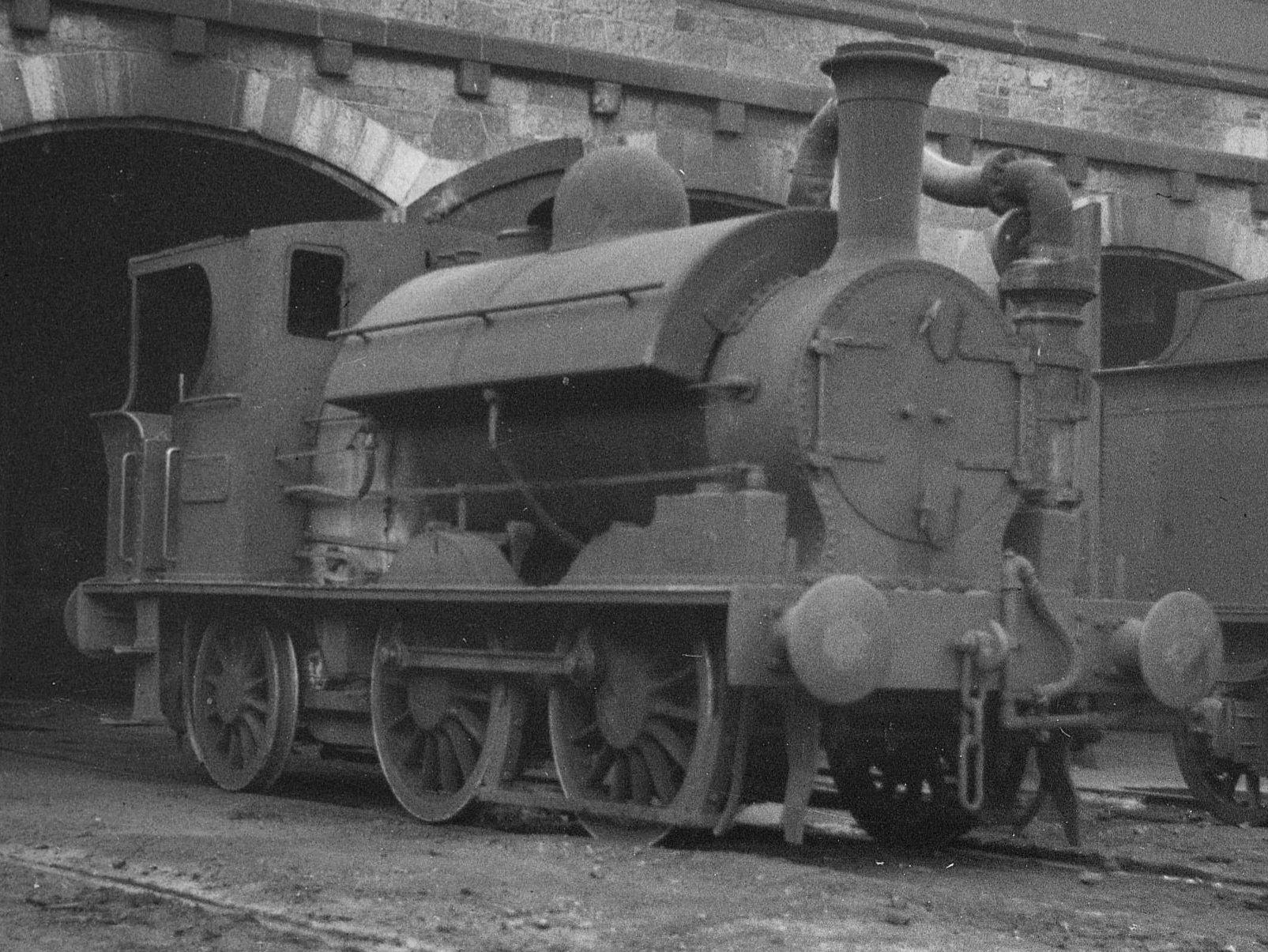
Sambo pre-rebuild.
