= Charles Clifford (locomotive engineer) =

Locomotive superintendent of the Great Northern Railway of Ireland

- Born: c.1843
- Died: 5 September 1927
- Engineering career
- Discipline: Locomotive engineering

Charles Clifford was locomotive superintendent of the Great Northern Railway of Ireland (GNRI) from 1895 to 1912. Clifford is attributed with increasing the size and power of the GNRI locomotive stock to match the increasing length and weight of train loads in this period; producing locomotives of that stood comparison with those of the Great Southern and Western Railway.

== Biography ==
Clifford began his railway career as an apprentice to Samuel Wilfred Haughton, leaving the Dublin, Wicklow and Wexford Railway in 1861. At the Irish North Western Railway (INWR) in Dundalk he became Locomotive Superintendent. On the amalgamation on the INWR to the GNR he transferred to the new company under J.C. Park. On Park's retirement in 1895 Clifford took the position of Locomotive Superintendent of the GNR.

Clifford retired from the GNR in 1912. He died on 5 September 1927.
