= DWWR 17 =

Irish Rail locomotive

DW&WR 17
- No. 17 crashed at Harcourt Street station in 1900 breaking through the wall to Hatch Street
Type and origin
- Power type: Steam
- Designer: R. Cronin
- Builder: Grand Canal Street
- Build date: 1899, 1901
Specifications
- Configuration
  - Whyte: 0-6-0
- Gauge: 5 ft 3 in (1,600 mm)
- Driver dia.: 5 ft 0 in (1,520 mm)
- Axle load: 13.5 long tons (13.7 t)
- Loco weight: 37.8 long tons (38.4 t)
- Water cap.: 1,850 imp gal (8,400 L; 2,220 US gal)
- Boiler pressure: 160 lbf/in^{2} (1.10 MPa)
- Cylinders: 2
- Cylinder size: 17 in × 24 in (432 mm × 610 mm) (17); 18 in × 24 in (457 mm × 610 mm) (36)
Performance figures
- Tractive effort: 15,750 lbf (70.06 kN) (17); 17,630 lbf (78.42 kN) (36)
Career
- Operators: DW&WR; DSER; GSR; CIÉ
- Class: J20/J14 (Inchicore)
- Power class: M (17) H/J (36)
- Number in class: 2
- Numbers: 17, 36; 440, 441 (GSR)
- Locale: Ireland
- Withdrawn: 1935
- Scrapped: 1935
- Disposition: Both scrapped
- No. 17 As built

The Dublin, Wicklow, and Wexford Railway (DWWR) No. 17 (named Wicklow) was a steam locomotive owned by the Dublin, Wicklow and Wexford Railway. The locomotive, using a 0-6-0 configuration, was built in 1899 at Grand Canal Street railway works and was followed by the slightly larger No. 36 (Wexford) in 1901.

== History ==
No. 17 certainly contained some part from the withdrawn locomotive of the 0-4-2 configuration which also carried the number 17. No. 36 had larger cylinders and the Dublin and South Eastern Railway (DSER) trialled it with a Phoenix superheater between 1911 and 1915. Comparison trials on freight trains showed No. 36 had 20% more power than No. 17 in this form. Despite this the DSER was to wait until the 2-6-0 moguls Nos. 15 and 16 in 1922 before making further use of superheating. On amalgamation to Great Southern Railways (GSR) in 1925 they were allocated to the single member classes 440/J20 and 441/J14 and renumbered as per the class. The GSR kept them for 4 and 10 years respectively before withdrawal.

== Harcourt Street Crash ==
DWWR No. 17 was the engine involved in the Harcourt Street crash on 14 February 1900. It could not stop its train in time and smashed through the buffers and station wall; nobody was killed but the driver had to have his arm amputated below the shoulder.
