= Grand Canal Street railway works =

Irish railway works

Grand Canal Street
- Operated: Bought 1840 (Note: Murray(1938) claims bought in 1840, Shepherd 1974 claims nearly ready in 1837)
- Location: Dublin, Ireland
- Coordinates: 53.3390°N 6.2375°W
- Industry: Rail transport

Grand Canal Street railway works, also known as The Factory, served the Dublin and Kingstown Railway (D&KR), its successors the Dublin, Wicklow and Wexford Railway (DW&WR) and the Dublin and South Eastern Railway (DSER). It was preceded by a small "engine hospital" maintenance depot at Serpentine Avenue.

== History ==
The D&KR had initially set up an "Engine Hospital" for the servicing of locomotives at Serpentine Avenue, about 1.5 km (0.93 mi) south west of Westland Row past the River Dodder where railway cottages were subsequently built. The Serpentine depot had two sections, one for the three engines from Robert Sharps, initially supported by their engineer Francis Wrigley, and the three from Forresters supported by their man Alexander Allan.

The works was bought in 1840, engine and carriage repair having previously been carried out since 1834 at Serpentine Avenue.

The workshop was the former two-story Dock Distillery located on the south side of the railway between the now narrowed Grand Canal Dock, Barrow Street, and Upper Grand Canal Street. There was a locomotive shed on the opposite side of the railway to the works. The Grand Canal Dock station which opened in 2001 lies a little towards the Pearse side of the former works.

On 4 April 1841 it achieved a world first by being the first railway company owned workshop to build a locomotive, the 2-2-2T Princess. It produced its last locomotive in 1911.

With no lifting crane and poor workshop layout, the works was increasingly stretched by larger locomotives, shortages from the First World War and damages due to the Irish Civil War.

It was closed in 1925 following the amalgamation of the railways of Ireland to form the Great Southern Railways (GSR).

== Locomotive superintendents ==
Grand Canal Street and its predecessor Serpentine Road had the following locomotive superintendents who may have been under related titles and had additional responsibilities:

- T. F. Bergin (Note: Bergin was initially Mechanical Engineer and Chief Inspector of Works for the D&KR to Jun 1835 as well as being "clerk" or secretary of the D&KR)
- John Melling (June 1835—January 1840)
- Richard Pim (January 1840—August 1843)
- James Rawlins (1843—July 1849)
- Samuel Wilfred Haugton (1849—1864)
- W Meilke (1864—1865)
- John Wakefield (1865—1882)
- W Wakefield (1882—1894)
- Thomas Grierson (1894—1897)
- Richard Cronin (1897—1917)
- George H. Wild (1917—1924)

== Sources ==
- Baker, Michael H. C. (1972). Irish Railways since 1916. Ian Allan. ISBN 0711002827.
- —— (June 1938). "Dublin's First Railway". Dublin Historical Record. 1 (2). Old Dublin Society. JSTOR 30080094. Part2 – The line in operation.
- —— (1981). Ireland's First Railway. Dublin: Irish Railway Record Society. ISBN 0-904078-07-8.
- Shepherd, Ernie (1974). The Dublin & South Eastern Railway (1974 ed.). David and Charles. ISBN 0715363611.
