= MGWR Classes F, Fa, and Fb =

Classes of Irish locomotives

Midland Great Western Classes F, Fa, and Fb
Type and origin
- Power type: Steam
- Designer: Walter H. Morton
- Builder: Armstrong Whitworth (5), MGWR Broadstone Works, Dublin (18)
- Serial number: AW 175–179
- Build date: 1921–1924
- Total produced: 23
Specifications
- Configuration
  - Whyte: 0-6-0
  - UIC: C h2
- Gauge: 5 ft 3 in (1,600 mm)
- Driver dia.: 5 ft 8 in (1,727 mm)
- Axle load: 18 long tons 0 cwt (40,300 lb or 18.3 t); 18 long tons 0 hundredweight (18.3 t; 20.2 short tons)
- Loco weight: 49 long tons 4 cwt (110,200 lb or 50 t); 49 long tons 4 hundredweight (50.0 t; 55.1 short tons)
- Fuel capacity: Coal: 7 long tons 0 cwt (15,700 lb or 7.1 t); 7 long tons 0 hundredweight (7.1 t; 7.8 short tons)
- Tender cap.: F,Fa: 2,500 imperial gallons (11,000 L; 3,000 US gal); Fb: 2,800 imperial gallons (13,000 L; 3,400 US gal)
- Firebox
  - Grate area: 17.3 sq ft (1.61 m^{2})
- Boiler pressure: 175 lbf/in^{2} (1,206.58 kPa)
- Heating surface
  - Firebox: 126 sq ft (11.7 m^{2})
  - Tubes and flues: 821 sq ft (76.3 m^{2})
- Superheater
  - Heating area: 210 sq ft (20 m^{2})
- Cylinders: Two, inside
- Cylinder size: 19 in × 26 in (483 mm × 660 mm)
- Valve type: 8 in (203 mm) piston valves
- Train heating: steam
Performance figures
- Tractive effort: 20,530 lbf (91.32 kN)
Career
- Operators: MGWR → GSR → CIÉ
- Class: MGWR F/Fa/Fb; GSR/CIÉ: 623 or J5
- Nicknames: Cattle Engines

The MGWR Classes F, Fa and Fb are a group of similar classes of 0-6-0 steam locomotives of the Midland Great Western Railway of Ireland which were designed and built between 1921 and 1924. The locomotives could be used to handle goods and also for passenger traffic.

== History ==
The Midland Great Western Railway was looking to modernise its motive power fleet, and turned to their Chief Mechanical Engineer, Walter H. Morton, to design a locomotive which could be capable of handling goods, and if required, for local passenger traffic. The specific official need for the new class was to replace the poorly performing MGWR Class C 4-4-0 locomotives on passenger and limited mail services on the Mullingar—Dublin section of the line. The resulting design from the Broadstone Works (Dublin) Drawing Office was for a six-coupled (0-6-0) tender locomotive, and the first appearing from the works in 1921, the last in 1924. There are some thoughts the design may have been influenced by the availability of cheap surplus parts following the First World War.

This was the last complete class of locomotives designed and built at Broadstone before closure and transfer of work to Inchicore Works. The only other locomotives to follow from Broadstone were the first of the "kit-built" Woolwich Moguls (GSR Class 372) before this was also transferred to Inchicore.

There was a total of 23 members of the class, the first three were Class F, the next ten (including the five Armstrong Whitworth built locomotives) were Class Fa, and the last ten with raised running plates were Class Fb. All were classified by the Great Southern Railways (GSR) as Class 623, or Class J5. All passed to the Córas Iompair Éireann (CIÉ) on its formation in 1945. Examples of the class survived until 1963, almost to the end of steam on the CIÉ.

== Oil firing ==
In the severe winter of 1946/47 coal was in short supply and, with services disrupted, the CIÉ. took the decision to convert 97 locomotives to oil-burning, the main classes chosen for this being the various 2-6-0s and the 623s, although this was extended to some 4-6-0s. Locomotives which were converted to oil-burning had a white circle painted on the smokebox and tender sides. A supply of coal from America arrived in March 1947 but it took a further three months to build up stocks before normal services could be resumed.

== Service ==
Although initially fitted with steam heat for passenger and limited mail services, and noted for ability to perform GSR Class 372 mogul 2-6-0 services when required, it was also observed they had a high level of wear and attrition when used on such work. In practice they were predominantly employed on freight work, proving to be able to successfully work heavy livestock trains at moderately high speeds, albeit with a somewhat high maintenance requirement.

== Livery ==
Since 1913 the MGWR had been painting all locomotives black with red linings so they being built from 1921 they would not have carried the bright emerald green of other MGWR locomotives. Unlike most MGWR engines they were not named and they carried painted rather than cast iron cabside number plates. On their first visit to the workshops following the 1925 amalgamation to form the GSR the class were repainted into the standard "dark battleship grey" colours of the new company. Buffer beams were vermilion. Following the absorption of the GSR into CIÉ in 1945, and CIÉs nationalisation in 1950, the only changes which took place were the addition of the light green CIÉ "flying snail" logo to the tender sides. The grey livery, like on most CIÉ locomotives, remained until withdrawal in the early 1960s.
