= MGWR Class A =

Express passenger 4-4-0 locomotive introduced in 1902

A/A1/As class
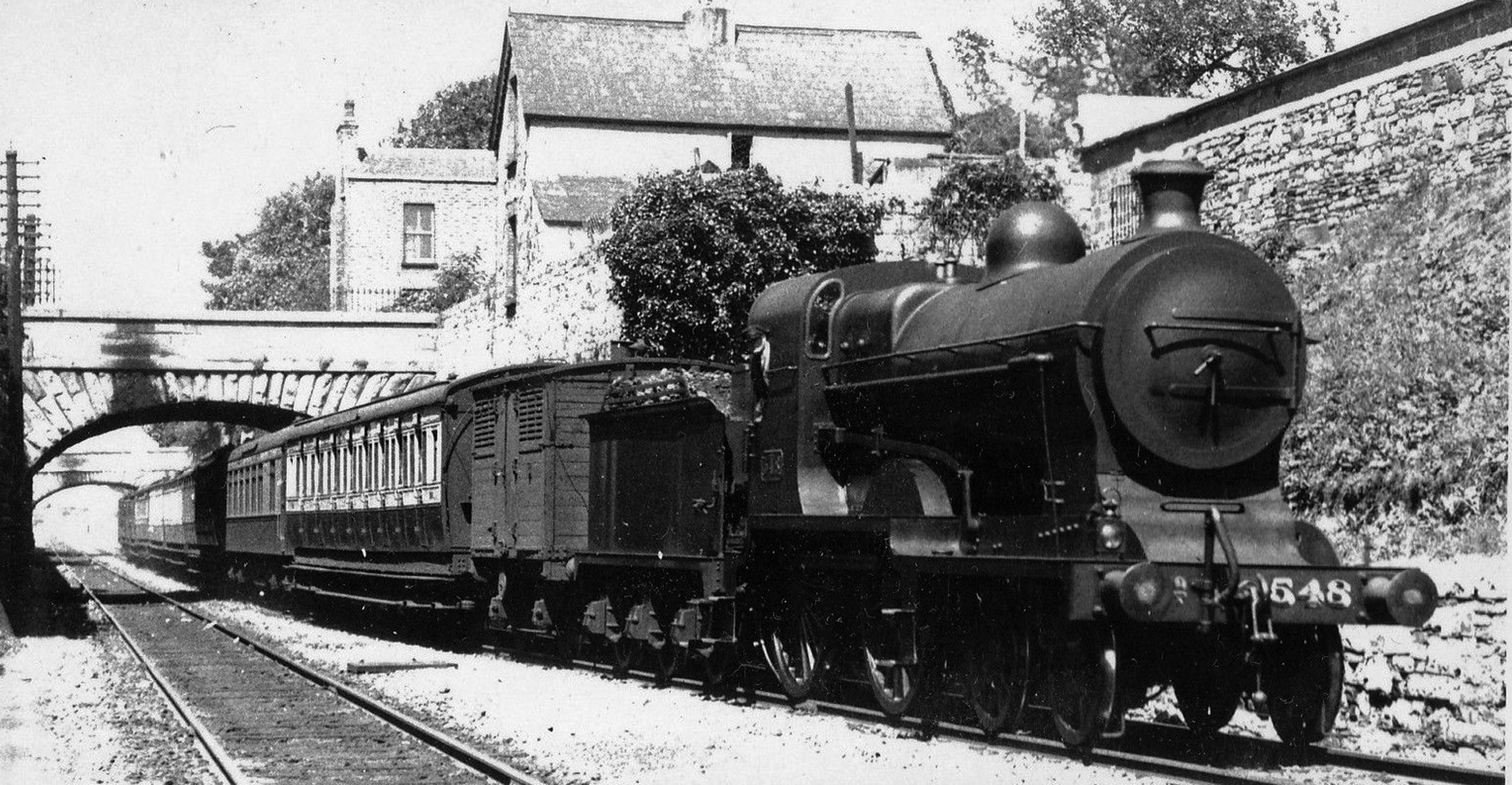
- GSR No. 548 formerly MGWR Class As Atlantic
Type and origin
- Power type: Steam
- Designer: Edward Cusack
- Builder: Broadstone
- Build date: 1902—1905
- Total produced: 6
- Number rebuilt: 6
Specifications
- Configuration
  - Whyte: 4-4-0
- Gauge: 5 ft 3 in (1,600 mm)
- Leading dia.: 3 ft 6 in (1,070 mm)
- Driver dia.: 6 ft 3 in (1,900 mm)
- Wheelbase
  - Leading: 5 ft 6 in (1,680 mm)
  - Drivers: 9 ft 3 in (2,820 mm)
- Length: 31 ft 3 1/2 in (9,538 mm)
- Axle load: 18 long tons 1 cwt (40,400 lb or 18.3 t)
- Adhesive weight: 34 long tons 3 cwt (76,500 lb or 34.7 t)
- Loco weight: 51 long tons 5 cwt (114,800 lb or 52.1 t)
- Fuel type: Coal
- Water cap.: 3,000 imp gal (14,000 L; 3,600 US gal)
- Cylinders: 2
- Cylinder size: 18 in × 26 in (457 mm × 660 mm)
Performance figures
- Tractive effort: 16,700 lbf (74.29 kN)
Career
- Operators: Midland Great Western Railway; Great Southern Railways; CIÉ
- Class: D5 (Inchicore)
- Power class: J
- Number in class: 6
- Numbers: MGWR 124—129; GSR/CÍE 545—550
- Nicknames: Celtic
- Locale: Ireland
- Withdrawn: 1931—1959

The Midland Great Western Railway (MGWR) A Class, later Inchicore Class D5, consisted of 6 4-4-0 express passenger locomotives built at Broadstone Works in the period 1902-1905. The largest express passenger locomotive in Ireland for a short while after introduction they were used on the MGWR's flagship services to Galway with most surviving until the 1950s albeit on less prestigious work.

== Design and modifications ==
In the late 1800s successively more powerful passenger locomotives had been introduced to facilitate increasing train weights and passenger timings. With Class K the limits of the 2-4-0 were being approached and the rival Great Southern and Western Railway (GS&WR) had been using 4-4-0's not only on their main Dublin-Cork but secondary routes also and were at the beginning of the 1900s introducing a further generation of larger 4-4-0s. Martin Atock of the MGWR was known to be resistant to bogies but perhaps influenced by his deputy Edward Cusack in 1900 at the end of his service organised rebuilds of older 2-4-0 locomotives to a small 4-4-0. When Cusack succeeded Atock he chose to quickly follow through with six large 4-4-0s that to were become known as Class A for the MGWR's premier passenger trains and which were the largest in Ireland for a short while after their introduction.

Although the design is attributed to Cusack it is generally understood Morton, at that stage fourth in line, likely did most of the detailed design work. These were the first Broadstone locomotives to be built with a Belpaire firebox. They had a restrictively high axle load of 18 tons which limited the routes upon which they could be used.

MGWR Class A/A1/As locomotives
| MGWR No. | Name | Built | GSR No. | MGWR Rebuild | MGWR Rebuild Class | Withdrawn |
|---|---|---|---|---|---|---|
| 127 | Titanic | 1903 | 545 | 1920 | A1 | 1955 |
| 129 | Celtic | 1902 | 546 | 1918 | A1 | 1959 |
| 125 | Britanic | 1905 | 547 | 1917 | A1 | 1954 |
| 126 | Atlantic | 1904 | 548 | 1925 | As | 1955 |
| 128 | Majestic | 1902 | 549 | 1926 | As | 1931 |
| 124 | Mercuric | 1905 | 550 | 1916/1924 | A1/As | 1957 |

The first to be rebuilt was No. 124 Mercuric in 1916 after just 11 years. It was to receive a Belpaire superheated boiler with Schmidt superheater, cylinders increased to 19 in × 26 in (483 mm × 660 mm) and 8 in (203 mm) piston valves. The Morton designed smokebox extension to accommodate the superheater was felt by Oswald Nock to be a cheap and effective solution but that it somewhat spoiled an otherwise beautiful design. This increased the tractive effort to 18,600 lbf (82.74 kN). Nos. 125, 127 and 129 were similarly treated between 1917 and 1920. The resulting locomotives were reclassified as Class As, though some detail variations began to creep in for example No. 127 had a Robinson Superheater. Due to suspect problems with hot axle boxes on the original tenders the A1 locomotives had theirs switched mostly with those from Class H. Rebuilds increased locomotive weight with the maximum axle loading going up towards 19 long tons (19 t).

Engine No. 124, which had been upgraded to As standard in 1916, was involved in an Irish Civil War incident at Streamstown south of Mullingar in 1923 which required it to be totally rebuilt with shortened frames and re-designated A1. The remaining two A class engines in original condition were rebuilt to As standard in 1925 and 1926. The As locomotives were readily distinguished by a raised footplate over the coupled wheels.

In 1925 on amalgamation they were allocated Great Southern Railways (GSR) Class 545 / Inchicore Class D5.

Th 1931 saw the withdrawal of No. 549 (128). No. 546 nearly met the same fate but was rebuilt with parts from no. 549 and boiler from No. 646 in 1933, this being notable as the final rebuild at Broadstone before all such work was handed to Inchicore. No. 646 was again rebuilt in 1936 with a type A boiler, as were No.s 545 (127) and 546 (128) in 1937, the resulting locomotives having the maximum axle load reduced to 17 long tons 10 cwt (39,200 lb or 17.8 t)

== Service ==
The introduction of the A class in 1902 enabled 16 minutes to be cut from the prestige limited mail (Note: limited for limited number of stops and mail due conveyance of mail with connections from the Irish sea mailboats) service from Dublin Broadstone to Galway, the coaching stock also being upgraded to include bogie coaches at the same time. In practice high axle load meant they were initially restricted to work Dublin-Mullingar portion of the trip until bridge strengthening at Athlone allows them to work through to Galway. The class was described as not having a great top speed which some attributed to crossed rods, (Note: Crossed rods refers to the rods crossing when the cranks and eccentrics are in a position nearest the link) while nevertheless being good pullers. Oswald Nock in his book "Irish Steam" comments the MGWR schedules did not tax these locomotives and indicated a run of an average speed of 51.4 miles per hour (82.7 km/h) for the 38.6 miles (62.1 km) from Killucan to Ashtown with a load of 290 long tons 0 cwt (649,600 lb or 294.7 t) superheated Mercuric.

In 1938 and 1945 all were based at Broadstone apart from No. 546 which was based at Cork. Reports in 1948 indicated they were unreliable and only capable of hauling up to 150 tons. There high axle load limited them from most branch lines and they were mostly used for auxiliary goods (freight) for which they were not efficient. Other reports implied they were used on stopping services to Galway.

Despite the poor report in 1948 they survived all into the 1950s and the arrival of the diesels with the final withdrawal in 1959.

== Livery ==
When introduced they were painted royal blue and lined in yellow. Buffers and buffer beams and a band around the funnel was bright red. The blue paint was however found not to be durable and faded easily after a few years and was replaced with green, albeit of a lighter shade than the MGWR had used hitherto. From 1913 they were painted black. Amalgamation to the GSR saw nameplates removed, change to standard GSR slate grey and eventual replacement of number plates by yellow painted numbers.

== Sources ==
- Boocock, Colin (1 October 2009). "Locomotive Compendium Ireland" (1st ed.). Ian Allan Publishing. ISBN 9780711033603.
- Clements, Jeremy; McMahon, Michael (2008). Locomotives of the GSR. Colourpoint Book. ISBN 9781906578268.
- Nock, O.S. (1982). Irish steam : a twenty-year survey, 1920-1939. Newton Abbott and Pomfret, Vermont: David & Charles. ISBN 0715379615. OCLC 9802320.
- Shepherd, Ernie (1994). The Midland Great Western Railway of Ireland. Leicester, England: Midland Publishing Limited. ISBN 1-85780-008-7.
