= MGWR Class D =

Class of Irish locomotives

Midland Great Western Railway D
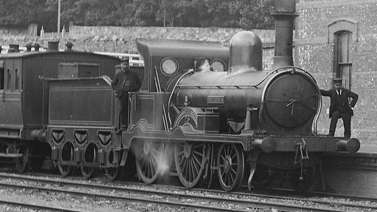
- No. 26 ‘Britannia’ standing at Clifden.
Type and origin
- Power type: Steam
- Builder: Beyer, Peacock & Company
- Build date: 1873–1887
- Total produced: 39
- Rebuild date: 1900–1901
- Number rebuilt: 6
Specifications
- Configuration
  - Whyte: 2-4-0
  - UIC: 1B
- Gauge: 5 ft 3 in (1,600 mm)
Career
- Operators: Midland Great Western Railway
- Class: MGWR: D
- Numbers: MGWR: 1–6, 13–26, 30–48
- Withdrawn: 1922 (bogie rebuilds 1945–1953)

The MGWR Class D were 2-4-0 steam locomotives built in batches from 1873 to 1887 for the Midland Great Western Railway (MGWR) of Ireland to a Martin Atock design. Numbering 39 at their peak they were the standard MGWR passenger locomotive of their era. Six of the class were rebuilt as 4-4-0.

== Table ==
MGWR No.	Name	Builder	Introduced	D-bogie	GSR No.	Withdrawn
1	Orion	Broadstone	1884			1922
2	Jupiter	Beyer-Peacock	1880	1900	534	1949
3	Juno	Beyer-Peacock	1880	1901	535	1949
4	Venus	Broadstone	1884			1910
5	Mars	Broadstone	1884			1910
6	Vesta	Broadstone	1884			1816
13	Rapid	Neilson	1873			1893
14	Racer	Neilson	1873			1893
15	Rover	Neilson	1873			1895
16	Rob Roy	Neilson	1873			1895
17	Reindeer	Neilson	1873			1894
18	Ranger	Neilson	1873			1893
19	Spencer	Neilson	1873			1894
20	Speedy	Neilson	1873			1894
21	Swift	Neilson	1873			1896
22	Samson	Neilson	1873			1896
23	Sylph	Neilson	1873			1896
24	Sprite	Neilson	1873			1896
25→4	Cyclops	Beyer-Peacock	1880	1901	531	1945
26→5	Britania	Beyer-Peacock	1880	1900	532	1949
30	Active	Dübs	1876			1897
31	Alert	Dübs	1876			1897
32	Ariel	Dübs	1876			1897
33	Arrow	Dübs	1876			1898
34	Aurora	Dübs	1876			1898
35	Airedale	Kitson	1886			1922
36→1	Empress of Austria	Beyer-Peacock	1881	1900	530	1949
37→35→6	Wolfdog	Beyer-Peacock	1881	1900	533	1953
38	Eagle	Kitson	1886			1923
39	Hawk	Kitson	1886			1922
40	Lily	Kitson	1886			1922
41	Regal	Broadstone	1883			1915
42	Ouzel	Broadstone	1883			1921
43	Leinster	Broadstone	1887			1916
44	Ulster	Broadstone	1887			1911
45	Queen	Broadstone	1886			1916
46	Connaught	Broadstone	1887			1921
47	Viceroy	Broadstone	1886			1921
48	Connaught	Broadstone	1887			1922

== History ==
The D class were originally built as 2-4-0s between 1873 and 1887. The first batch of 12 were built by Neilson & Company of Glasgow in 1873 and a further batch of 5 by Dübs & Company of Glasgow in 1876. The class took on all but the heaviest passenger duties becoming the standard passenger locomotive of their era. They were joined by a batch of six built by Beyer, Peacock & Company, Manchester in 1880–1881 and four were built by Kitson & Company of Leeds in 1884. MGWR's own Broadstone Works built twelve between 1883 and 1887. Although Broadstone Works has been extended 1877 the reason that ten were subcontracted externally was due to Broadstone working to capacity at the time.

The first batches from Neilsons and Dübs were withdrawn 1893–1898 and replaced by the more powerful MGWR Class K 2-4-0, which cascaded the remaining Class D's to secondary duties.

The batch of six Beyer-Peacock locomotives were selected for a rebuild to a 4-4-0 bogie design in 1900/01, the first use of such a configuration on the MGWR. The rebuilt locomotives were found wanting for their intended use on the Sligo line west of Mullingar but nevertheless paved the way for the MGWR Class A and Class C 4-4-0s whilst doing useful work in the County Mayo and Achill areas.

The remaining Kitson and Broadstone built members of the class were withdrawn between 1911 and 1922, being cascaded out by more powerful 4-4-0 passenger locomotives being introduced.
