= MGWR Class K =

Class of Irish steam locomotives

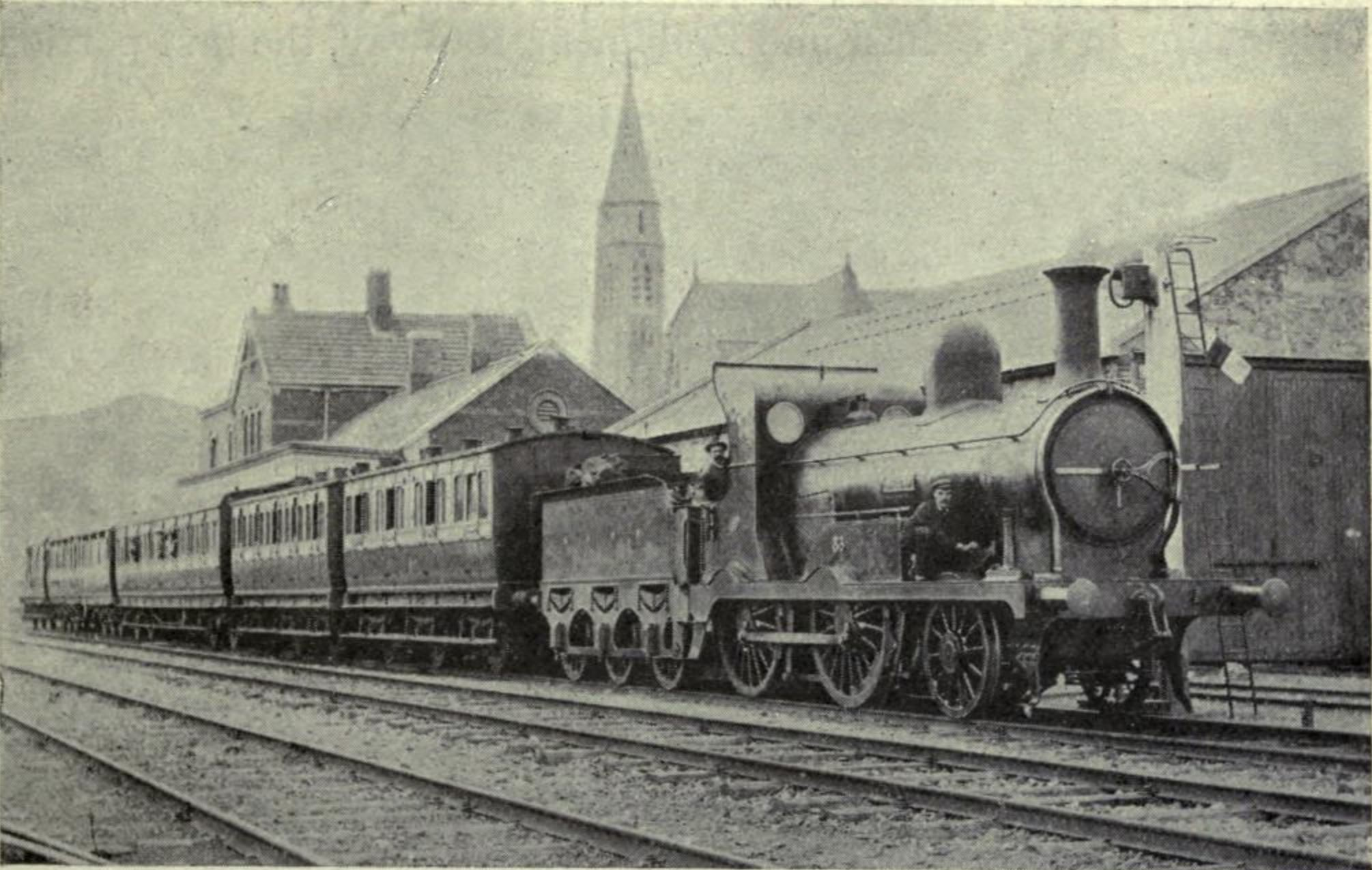
- MGWR Class K 2-4-0 on an express at Clifden in 1914.
Type and origin
- Power type: Steam
- Designer: Martin Atock
- Builder: Broadstone Works
- Build date: 1893-1898
- Total produced: 20
Specifications
- Configuration
  - Whyte: 2-4-0
- Gauge: 5 ft 3 in (1,600 mm)
- Leading dia.: 4 feet 0 inches (1.22 m)
- Coupled dia.: 5 feet 8 inches (1.73 m)
- Length: 26 feet 5.25 inches (8.0582 m)
- Axle load: 15 tons
- Adhesive weight: 26 tons
- Loco weight: 38 tons
Career
- Operators: MGWR; GSR; CIÉ
- Numbers: MGWR 13-24,27-34; GSR/CIÉ 650-668
- Official name: MGWR Class K GSR Class 650 G2
- Withdrawn: 1923 (Civil War loss); 1954-1963 (remainder)

The MGWR Class K was a Midland Great Western Railway (MGWR) 2-4-0 designed by Martin Atock for passenger work and introduced from 1893. They replaced earlier MGWR Class D locomotives that carried the same names and numbers. The class was also known as the Great Southern Railways (GSR) 650 G2 class.

== Locomotives ==
MGWR No.	Name	Introduced	GSR No.	Withdrawn
13	Rapid	1893	659	1961
14	Racer	1893	650	1959
15	Rover	1895	660	1959
16	Rob Roy	1895	651	1959
17	Reindeer	1894	661	1959
18	Ranger	1893	652	1954
19	Spencer	1894	653	1963
20	Speedy	1896	War loss	1923
21	Swift	1896	662	1955
22	Samson	1896	663	1959
23	Sylph	1896	664	1961
24	Sprite	1896	665	1959
27	Clifden	1896	666	1957
28	Clara	1896	654	1963
29	Clonsilla	1896	655	1961
30	Active	1897	656	1957
31	Alert	1897	667	1957
32	Ariel	1897	668	1959
33	Arrow	1898	657	1961
34	Aurora	1898	658	1954

== Design and historical development ==
The design was a progression of the MGWR Class D standard passenger locomotive and resulted in a design more powerful than the MGWR Class D-bogie 4-4-0. They were rebuilt with superheated boilers from 1918 increasing their power still further and becoming one of the few if not only superheated 2-4-0 classes in the world.

== Services ==
They were initially allocated to top expresses such at the limited mail with some of the heaviest requiring double heading. After the turn of the century they were displaced by 4-4-0 types to secondary duties throughout the MGWR network but became mainly based around the Sligo line in the GSR/CIÉ era. On the Achill line they would be brought in for heavier trains particular after 6 coupled locomotives were banned after 1925 on that branch. They remained active and useful into the 1950s with the last withdrawal in 1963. The locomotive class was also noted for working on the Ballaghaderreen branch line in its final years.

== Accidents and incidents ==
Several of the class were damaged in civil war incidents in 1922/23. In particular No. 20 Speedy was destroyed at Killala on 3 February 1923.
