= MGWR Class H =

MGWR H class
Type and origin
- Power type: Steam
- Builder: Avonside Engine Company
- Build date: 1878
- Total produced: 4
Specifications
- Configuration
  - Whyte: 0-6-0
- Gauge: 5 ft 3 in (1,600 mm)
- Driver dia.: 4 ft 9 in (1,450 mm)
Career
- Operators: Midland Great Western Railway (MGWR); Great Southern Railways (GSR); CIÉ
- Number in class: 4
- Numbers: MGWR 96-99; GSR 619-622
- Locale: Ireland
- Withdrawn: 1945-1949
- Disposition: All scrapped

The Midland Great Western Railway (MGWR) Class H were an 0-6-0 locomotive bought in 1880 from Avonside Engine Company. After 1925 they became Great Southern Railways (GSR) class 619 / Inchicore class J6.

== Fleet ==
MGWR No.	Name	Built	GSR No.	Withdrawn
96	Avonside	1878	619	1949
97	Hibernia	1878	620	1949
98	Caledonia	1878	621	1949
99	Cambria	1878	622	1945

== History ==
The MGWR acquired these engines at a favourable price from the Avonside Engine Company when the original customer, the Waterford, Dungarvan and Lismore Railway, refused the locomotives due to late delivery and other potential buyers had rejected them. They were notable for being fitted with more comfortable and spacious cabs compared to contemporary MGWR designed locomotives. Due to lack of vacuum train brakes they were confined to North Wall freight yard workings until their first and very extensive rebuild in 1906-1908.

Locomotive no. 99 was used in the trials of the patent Cusack-Morton superheater from 1915 to 1916. All the class were then rebuilt with either a Belpaire(Robinson) superheater boiler with piston values between 1918 and 1922.

Noted as powerful free steaming engines capable of hauling 55 wagons on the main line they proved for goods work they were also suitable for slower speed passenger services.
