= MGWR Classes C and Cs =

Class of Irish locomotives

C class
Type and origin
- Power type: Steam
- Designer: Edward Cusack
- Builder: Broadstone
- Build date: 1909–1915
- Total produced: 9
Specifications
- Configuration
  - Whyte: 4-4-0
- Gauge: 5 ft 3 in (1,600 mm)
- Leading dia.: 3 ft 6 in (1,070 mm)
- Driver dia.: 6 ft 3 in (1,900 mm)
- Tender wheels: 3 ft 9 in (1,140 mm)
- Wheelbase
  - Engine: 20 ft 11 in (6,380 mm)
  - Drivers: 8 ft 2 in (2,490 mm)
  - Tender: 12 ft (3,700 mm)
- Total weight: 74 tons
- Firebox
  - Grate area: 16 sq ft (1.5 m^{2})
- Boiler
  - Diameter: 4 ft 5 in (1,350 mm)
- Boiler pressure: 175 lbs
- Heating surface
  - Firebox: 115 sq ft (10.7 m^{2})
  - Tubes: 975 sq ft (90.6 m^{2})
- Cylinder size: 18 in × 26 in (460 mm × 660 mm)
Career
- Operators: Midland Great Western Railway; Great Southern Railways
- Class: C
- Number in class: 9
- Numbers: 536–544
- Locale: Ireland
- Withdrawn: 1950–1959

The Midland Great Western Railway (MGWR) C Class was a class of 4-4-0 locomotives designed and built at Broadstone by Edward Cusack between 1909 and 1915 using parts obtained from Kitson and Company. They replaced the earlier 7-12 class. The class survived through the Great Southern Railways (GSR) era from 1925-1944 and were withdrawn in the 1950s under Córas Iompair Éireann.

== Locomotives ==
The class consisted of nine locomotives as follows:

MGWR No.	Name	Built	GSR No.	GSR Class	Inchicore Class	Withdrawn
4 (25 from 1924)	Ballynahinch	1910	538	536	D7	1950
5 (26 from 1924)	Croagh Patrick	1910	539	536	D7	1952
6 (9 from 1924)	Kylemore	1911	542	540	D6	1959
7	Connemara	1909	540	540	D6	1953
8	St. Patrick	1913	541	540	D6	1959
9 (20 from 1924)	Emerald Isle	1912	537	536	D7	1953
10	Faugh a Ballagh	1909	543	540	D6	1959
11	Erin go Bragh	1915	544	540	D6	1955
12	Shamrock	1913	536	536	D7	1951

== History ==
From their introduction in 1909 the class was originally designed to be used principally on trains on the Sligo and Mayo branches. Their large driving wheels caused low acceleration and difficulties on gradients so they were deployed to Dublin-Galway slow passenger work. Poor riding also led to a high incidence of breaking of bogie springs.

In 1912 during the coal strike of that year No. 10 was converted to an oil burning locomotive using Holden oil burning apparatus.

The class were rebuilt with superheated boilers and new cabs over their long lives beginning in the 1920s. Those also having piston-valves formed GSR Class 540 whilst those retaining slide values going to GSR Class 536. They were withdrawn in the 1950s, Class 536 with their poorer performance first.

== Liveries ==
When introduced the locomotives carried an apple green livery with black edged with white lining. The tender was lettered MGWR with the company seal between the letters G and W. They carried brass nameplates on the lead driving when splasher with the builders plate and number on the cabside. From 1915 after W.H. Morton was appointed Chief Mechanical Engineer of the MGWR the engines were repainted black until the merger of the MGWR into the Great Southern Railways in 1925. From then until withdrawal, all were painted plain grey, initially with cast cabside numberplates (also plain grey), but from about 1949 these were gradually removed with pale yellow painted numerals substituted.

== References and sources ==
=== Sources ===
- "The Railway Magazine Volume XXV". Railway Magazine. XXV. 1909.(subscription required)
- Irish Railways In Pictures No. 2 The Midland Great Western Line. Irish Railway Record Society, London Area. November 1990. ISBN 978-0902564046.
- "Cusack 4-4-0 express locomotive: "Faugh a Ballagh"". The Locomotive Magazine. 16 (217). 15 September 1910.
