= SECR N class =

Class of English steam locomotives

SECR/SR N class
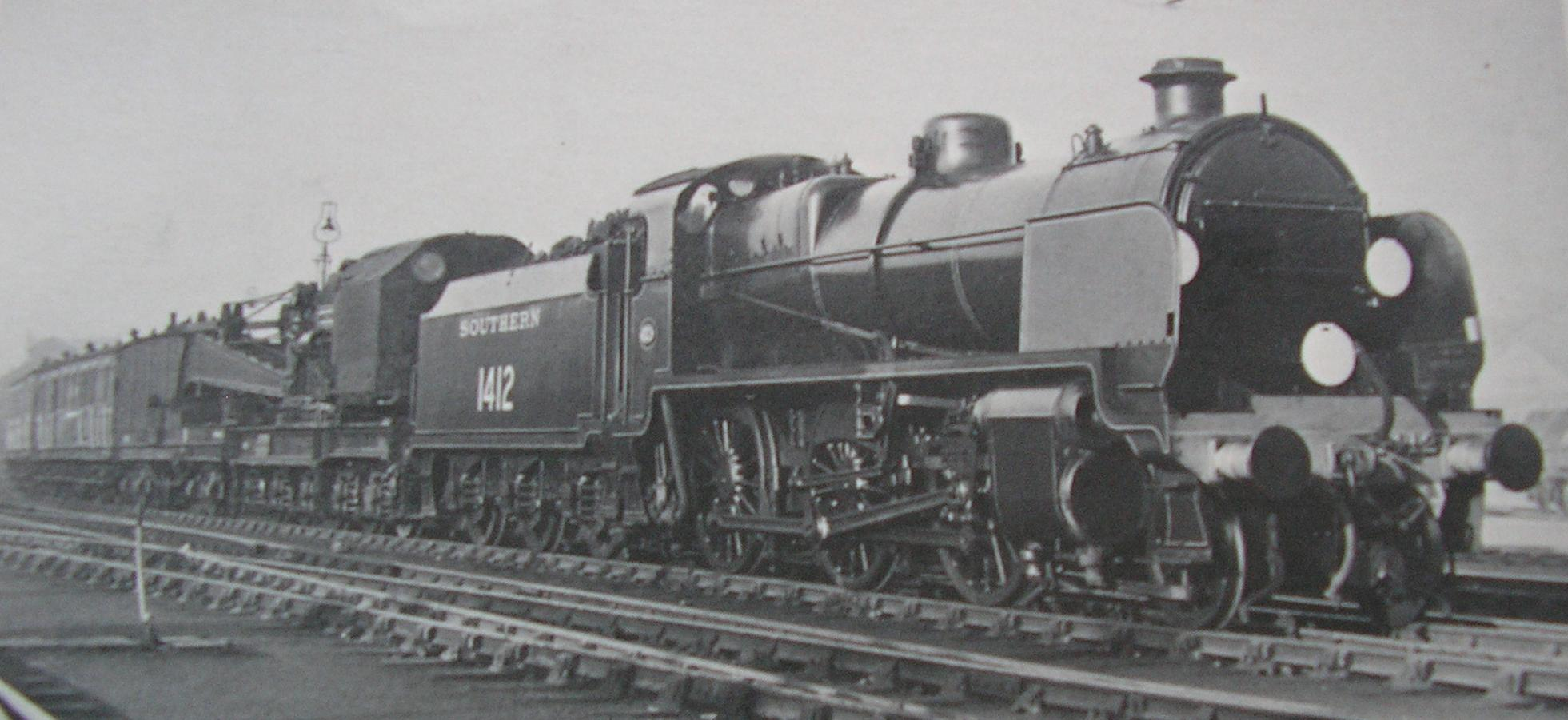
- No. 1412 coupled to a breakdown crane in 1938.
Type and origin
- Power type: Steam
- Designer: Richard Maunsell
- Builder: SECR/SR Ashford Works
- Build date: 1917–1934
- Total produced: 80
Specifications
- Configuration
  - Whyte: 2-6-0
  - UIC: 1′C h2
- Gauge: 4 ft 8 1/2 in (1,435 mm) standard gauge
- Leading dia.: 3 ft 1 in (0.940 m)
- Driver dia.: 5 ft 6 in (1.676 m)
- Length: 57 ft 10 in (17.63 m)
- Total weight: 103 long tons 12 cwt (232,100 lb or 105.3 t) (116.1 short tons)
- Fuel type: Coal
- Fuel capacity: 5 long tons (5.1 t; 5.6 short tons)
- Water cap.: 4,000 imp gal (18,000 L; 4,800 US gal)
- Boiler pressure: 200 lbf/in^{2} (1.38 MPa)
- Cylinders: Two, outside
- Cylinder size: 19 in × 28 in (483 mm × 711 mm)
- Valve gear: Walschaerts
Performance figures
- Tractive effort: 26,035 lbf (115.81 kN)
Career
- Operators: South Eastern and Chatham Railway; → Southern Railway; → British Railways
- Class: SECR / SR: N
- Power class: SECR / SR: B; BR: 4P5F
- Numbers: SECR: 810-875, SR: 1810-1875, 1400-1414, BR: 31810-31875, 31400-31414
- Nicknames: "Woolworths"
- Locale: Southern Region
- Withdrawn: 1962–1966
- Disposition: One preserved, remainder scrapped

The SECR N class is a type of 2-6-0 ("mogul") steam locomotive designed in 1914 by Richard Maunsell for mixed-traffic duties on the South Eastern and Chatham Railway (SECR). Built between 1917 and 1934, it was the first non-Great Western Railway (GWR) type to use and improve upon the basic design principles established by GWR Chief Mechanical Engineer (CME) George Jackson Churchward. The N class was based on the GWR 4300 Class design, improved with Midland Railway concepts.

The N class was mechanically similar to the SECR K class 2-6-4 passenger tank engine, also by Maunsell. It influenced future 2-6-0 development in Britain and provided the basis for the 3 cylinder N1 class of 1922. Production was delayed by the outbreak of the First World War in 1914, and the first N class rolled out of Ashford Works in 1917, three years after design work was completed. The class replaced obsolete 0-6-0s as part of the SECR's fleet standardisation, as they used parts interchangeable with those of other classes.

Eighty N class locomotives were built in three batches between the First and Second World Wars. Fifty were assembled from kits of parts made at the Royal Arsenal, Woolwich, giving rise to the nickname of "Woolworths". They worked over most of the Southern Railway (SR) network, and were used by the Southern Region of British Railways (BR) until the last was withdrawn in 1966. One N class locomotive is preserved on the Swanage Railway in Dorset, undergoing overhaul.

== Background ==
Three factors dictated the type of locomotive that could run on the South Eastern and Chatham Railway (SECR): increased freight and passenger train loadings, poor track quality, and weak, lightly built bridges. An increasing number of passengers used the SECR to reach the cross-Channel ferries at Dover and Folkestone between 1910 and 1913, and heavy goods trains between Tonbridge and Hither Green marshalling yard stretched the capabilities of existing locomotives and infrastructure. On the lines of the former London, Chatham and Dover Railway (LCDR), flint beach pebbles on a bed of ash had been used for ballast. Conventional track ballast has irregular shapes that "lock" together to keep the track in place, whereas the smooth pebbles used by the LCDR failed to prevent track movement under strain. The economies in construction meant that only locomotives with low axle loadings could run safely on the track. These restrictions meant that the SECR was unable to follow a coherent locomotive strategy that reduced costs and increased serviceability. The railway's Operating Department had to use mismatched classes of underpowered and obsolete 4-4-0 and 0-6-0 locomotives because they could run within the restrictions imposed by the infrastructure. This meant frequent double-heading that increased operational costs.

Richard Maunsell was appointed CME of the SECR in 1913, following the retirement of Harry Wainwright due to ill health. Wainwright left a legacy of competent but unspectacular locomotives that struggled to cope with the increased train lengths and loadings. Maunsell took control of the short-term situation by improving existing designs, and he introduced new engines to progressively replace obsolete classes. New designs could also cut costs on the SECR, as one capable mixed-traffic locomotive could undertake the work of two separate passenger or freight types. The first new design was to become Maunsell's N class 2-6-0.

== Design and construction ==
The N class was designed by Maunsell in 1914 to provide a sturdy mixed-traffic locomotive with high route availability. Intended to replace several obsolete 0-6-0 types, the N class was the first step in the SECR's fleet standardisation programme, which also included the K class 2-6-4T passenger tank locomotive. Maunsell enlisted the help of former GWR engineer Harold Holcroft, who suggested that a 2-6-0 wheel arrangement would allow the class to run on the poor-quality track in north Kent. This arrangement allowed for a longer wheelbase with leading axle to permit greater stability at speed on tight track curves, which had constrained the size of locomotives operating on the SECR. A longer locomotive could also accommodate a larger boiler than an 0-6-0, giving the N class sufficient power to avoid double-heading of locomotives on heavier trains.

The N class incorporated the principles of power and reliability established by George Churchward, using a Belpaire firebox that sloped downwards towards the cab instead of a round-topped version, a regulator located in the smokebox, long-travel valves for free running up to 70 mph (110 km/h), a sharply tapered and domeless boiler, and a right-hand driving position. These features are attributed to Holcroft, who worked on the GWR 4300 class before joining the SECR. The boiler was intended to become a standard component for use on future SECR locomotive designs, thereby reducing building times and improving organisation at the works. The size was constrained by the heavier axle-loading of Maunsell's proposed 2-6-4 tank locomotive variant of the N class, the K class, and was consequently smaller than was otherwise possible on the 2-6-0 chassis. The need to reduce overall weight also meant that the latter would feature lightly braced frames.

Maunsell's Chief Locomotive Draughtsman, James Clayton, brought functional Midland Railway influences to the design, such as the shape of the cab and the drumhead-type smokebox, which sat on a saddle that was of wider diameter than the fully lagged and clad boiler. Clayton was also responsible for the tender and chimney designs. Snifting valves were provided to prevent vacuum formation in the cylinders when the locomotive was stationary, and the outside Walschaerts valve gear incorporated single slide-bars and piston tail rods. Innovations added by Maunsell's team included steam-powered locomotive brakes, locating the boiler water top feed inside a dome-like cover with external clackboxes and water feed pipes mounted on either side, and a new type of superheater that segregated saturated and superheated steam. Maunsell also incorporated a screw reverser to control valve events, which was easier to maintain than the complex steam reverser configuration of previous SECR designs. All components were standardised for interchange with similar locomotive classes to ease maintenance and reduce production costs.

=== SECR batch ===
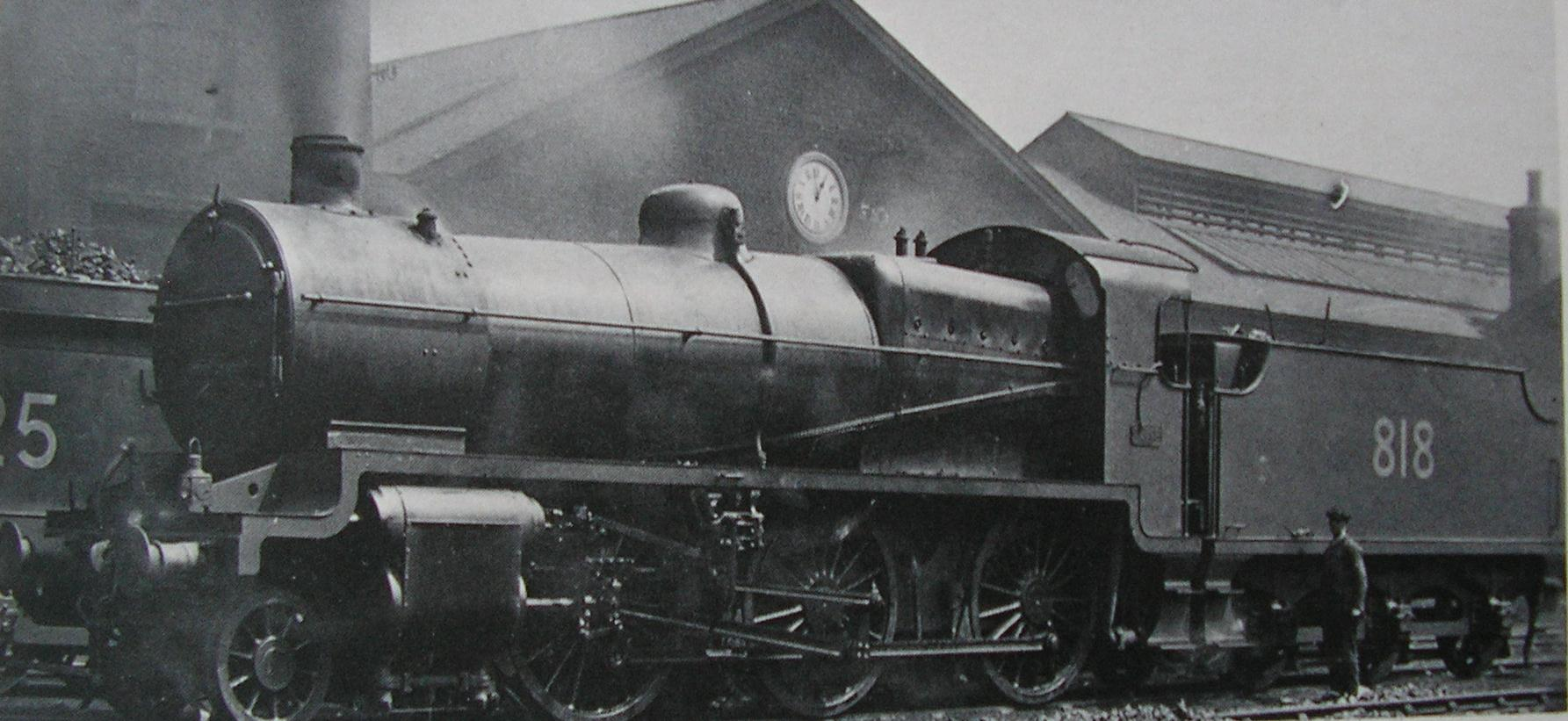
Despite being in Southern Railway ownership, No. 818 still featured the SECR dark grey livery in 1924. Note the "stovepipe" chimney, and the absence of a piston tail-rod on the cylinder front.

Production of the first batch was delayed by the outbreak of the First World War. Assembly began towards the end of the war and the first locomotive, No. 810, emerged from Ashford Works for proving trials in July 1917, one month after the first K class tank, whose design was derived from the N class. Entering service in August 1917, No. 810 was trialled for three years before another 15 locomotives (Nos. 811–825) were ordered in 1919. These were built between 1920 and 1923; their construction delayed by a backlog of repairs caused by the war. The first left Ashford Works in June 1920, featuring a greater superheating surface area within the boiler as a result of operational experience with No. 810. All locomotives were equipped with 3,500-imperial-gallon (15,911 L) tenders.

In 1922 modifications were made to No. 822 during assembly. This was because production delays at Ashford prevented the building of a proposed 3-cylinder design drawn-up in 1919. Maunsell and Holcroft revised No. 822's cylinder arrangement to accommodate a third inside cylinder fitted between the frames. The outside cylinders were also reduced to 16 in × 26 in (406 mm × 660 mm) diameter to accommodate the inside cylinder and its associated valve linkages. The differences between No. 822 and the rest of the N class meant that this locomotive was re-designated as the 1919 proposal, becoming the prototype of the SR N1 class when completed in March 1923.

=== "Woolwich" batch ===
The first batch of the N class proved successful in service, and few problems were encountered after settling-in. The Ministry of Supply drew up a contract for a second batch to the same specification – to be built at the Royal Arsenal, Woolwich. The government backing came as part of a proposal to nationalise the railways, which would require a standard fleet of locomotives to promote economies in production and maintenance. The nationalisation proposal was abandoned; instead, the government passed the Railways Act 1921, which grouped the railways into the "Big Four" in 1923. Building of the second batch went ahead to retain skilled labour at Woolwich, but the fabrication of 119 boilers for allocation to the kits of parts was contracted-out because of limited production capacity at Woolwich and Ashford; the North British Locomotive Company built 85, Robert Stephenson and Company 20, and Kitson & Co. 14. By 1924, the prefabricated components stored at Woolwich formed 100 complete N class kits for purchase from the government.

The newly created Southern Railway, which had absorbed the SECR in the 1923 "Grouping", undertook trials in early 1924 to compare the performance of its freight locomotives. Because the Ns were designed to haul both freight and passenger traffic, Maunsell, as the newly appointed Chief Mechanical Engineer of the Southern Railway, decided to compare the design with the N1, LSWR S15 and LB&SCR K classes in trials that involved hauling trains of 65 loaded wagons. Although the S15 was superior in freight haulage capacity and operational economy, the N class’ good all-round performance on passenger and freight meant that the type was adopted as the company's standard mixed-traffic design. The Southern Railway subsequently bought fifty "Woolwich" kits for assembly at Ashford between June 1924 and August 1925. These were identical to the SECR batch and were given numbers in the series A826–A875. The Midland Great Western Railway of Ireland bought 12 kits prior to its amalgamation into the Great Southern Railways, which bought an extra 15. The latter 15 locomotives were divided into eight GSR Class 372 with 5-foot-6-inch (1.676 m) driving wheels and six GSR Class 393 with 6-foot-0-inch (1.829 m) driving wheels: the final kit was kept for spares.

The Metropolitan Railway bought six kits for conversion to the Metropolitan Railway K Class 2-6-4T tank engines, which were similar in outline to the SECR K class. The remaining 17 complete kits at Woolwich were bought by the Southern Railway, and formed the basis of later locomotive classes such as the three-cylinder SR W class 2-6-4 tank locomotive. The prototype W class was produced in 1932 from N class parts with the addition of water tanks, a coal bunker, a rear bogie and a third cylinder between the frames. Woolwich also stocked a surplus of N class bogie components, and these were bought by the Southern for rebuilding the E1 0-6-0 tanks into the E1/R 0-6-2 tanks.

=== Southern Railway batch ===
In 1932, the Southern Railway ordered a final batch of 15 locomotives (Nos. 1400–1414) to expand class availability on the Southern Railway's network. These were built at Ashford works and differed from the previous 65 in a number of ways. The cabs of the final eight locomotives (Nos. 1407–1414) were fitted for left-hand driving, which was adopted as standard by the Southern Railway. The original N class chimney was replaced with the lower-profile version used on the U1 class, which increased route availability by allowing the locomotives to pass under lower bridges and tunnels. Maunsell had begun to research smoke deflection techniques to improve driver visibility on the King Arthur class between 1926 and 1927, which resulted in the adoption of a standard smoke deflector design for the Southern Railway. A smaller version was fitted to Nos. 1400–1414 during building.

Before entering service, the batch was attached to 4,000-imperial-gallon (18,184 L) tenders to increase operational range over the Southern Railway's long Western section routes. Despite this advantage, tenders fitted to the eight left-hand drive examples were intended for use with right-hand drive locomotives. This resulted in the location of the fireman's fittings on the "wrong" side of the cab. The design also necessitated the addition of a step to the footplate, as the boiler backhead was lower than the fall-plate that connected the tender and cab floors. The new batch incorporated a new set of footsteps beneath the front buffer beam, modified slide-bars and the dome was redesigned to incorporate the regulator to ease access during routine maintenance.

=== N class construction history ===
Year	Batch	Quantity	SECR/SR numbers	Notes
1917, 1920–23	SECR	16	810, 811–825	Locomotive No. 822 modified during construction to 3-cylinder arrangement, became SECR N1 class prototype
1924	Woolwich	50	A826–A875	Bought by Southern Railway
1924	Woolwich (outside buyer)	50		33 sold, 17 spare for future projects
1932–34	SR	15	1400–1414	

== Operational details ==
The N class was used to haul services over most of the SECR network and became a familiar sight on the difficult cross-country route between Tonbridge and Reading, on which the steep gradients had taxed the company's 4-4-0 and 0-6-0 designs. The success of the 2-6-0 in traversing this route was due to their higher-capacity tapered boilers that produced an ample supply of steam, and the small 5 ft 6 in (1.68 m) driving wheels that delivered considerable tractive effort when climbing gradients such as the 1 in 100 between Gomshall and Shalford.

After "The Grouping" in 1923, the N class remained on the former SECR network, which was incorporated into the Southern Railway's Eastern section. Typical services included Ramsgate, Ashford and Hither Green freights, and Cannon Street to Dover passenger trains. In early 1924 Nos. A815 and A825 were transferred to the former LSWR mainline between Waterloo and Guildford for trials. These proved successful, and paved the way for the allocation of most of the Woolwich batch to the Southern Railway's Western section. The type regularly replaced Dugald Drummond's ageing LSWR T9 class 4-4-0s on portions of the Atlantic Coast Express over the steeply graded mainlines west of Exeter.

The N class was also successful on the Central section, where they worked alongside L. B. Billinton's LB&SCR K class 2-6-0s. However the large cylinder and cab sizes of the N class prevented use of the type on the Eastern section's Tonbridge–Hastings line. The route's narrow bridges and tunnels were unable to accommodate the class, and provided justification for using the narrower 3-cylinder N1 class 2-6-0 on the route. Despite these restrictions, the class was capable of hauling heavy loads at moderate speeds, a useful attribute that was exploited throughout the Second World War. The entire class came into British Railways' ownership in 1948 and could be seen in most areas of the Southern Region.

=== Performance of the class and modifications ===
When introduced in 1917, the N class proved adept at hauling both passenger and freight services on the SECR. They were well liked by crews who appreciated the general robustness of the design, although the lightly built frames caused excessive vibration and rough riding on the footplate when worked hard. Despite there being little wrong with the original design, the N class’ full steaming potential was not realised because of the failure to capitalise upon a larger boiler, which was a direct consequence of Maunsell's standardisation policy. Instead, the SECR batch was trial-fitted with "stovepipe" chimneys in an attempt to improve draughting. This was initially applied to No. 812 in 1921, although two more were fitted to Nos. 817 and 819 during building because of a shortage of chimneys at Ashford Works. The chimney fitted to No. 819 was transferred to No. 818 sometime between 1921 and 1924, though all "stovepipes" had been replaced with the standard N class type by April 1927. Another trial saw the addition of a second slidebar to No. 825, which gave better support to the valve gear and helped protect it from spillage from the driving wheel sander fillers.

The quality of the original design was such that No. A866 was put on display at the British Empire Exhibition at Wembley from May to November 1925, and no class-wide modifications were made until 1934. This was when the SECR and Woolwich batches began to receive new domes and front footsteps during overhauls and general repairs. These were the same design as those used on Nos. 1400–1414, and were intended to standardise components between the batches. The SECR and Woolwich batches also received smoke deflectors to prevent drifting smoke from obscuring the driver's vision ahead. The U1 chimneys replaced the standard N class type on the earlier locomotives, which, along with the removal of the piston tail rods on the earlier batches, created a truly standardised appearance.

In 1937, Maunsell's replacement Oliver Bulleid saw no need to improve draughting of the class, and spared them from trials with Lemaître multiple-jet blastpipes and wide-diameter chimneys. However, he had Maunsell's smokebox-mounted anti-vacuum snifting valves removed at the end of the Second World War in an effort to reduce maintenance. Bulleid also had eight new 4,000-imperial-gallon (18,184 L) tenders built specially for the left-hand drive locomotives. In 1947, No. 1831 was given electric lighting and converted to oil-burning as part of government-backed fuel trials in anticipation of a post-war coal shortage, though it was reverted to coal-firing in December 1948.

The class was heavily used by British Railways: 29 locomotives required replacement cylinders between 1955 and 1961 due to excessive wear. Frames were occasionally replaced due to stress caused by heavy use, and the steam circuit was revised when new cylinders were fitted: the inside steam pipes of Maunsell's original design were replaced by outside steam pipes emerging from the smokebox, behind the smoke deflectors. From 1957, some of the locomotives had larger-diameter BR Standard Class 4 chimneys fitted to improve draughting with poor-quality coal, though the decline of steam on the Southern Region precluded use on the entire class. Crew reports maintained that the latter modifications cut fuel and water consumption. The final set of modifications constituted the fitting of new injectors and Automatic Warning System (AWS) equipment in 1957 and 1959 respectively.

=== Experiments ===
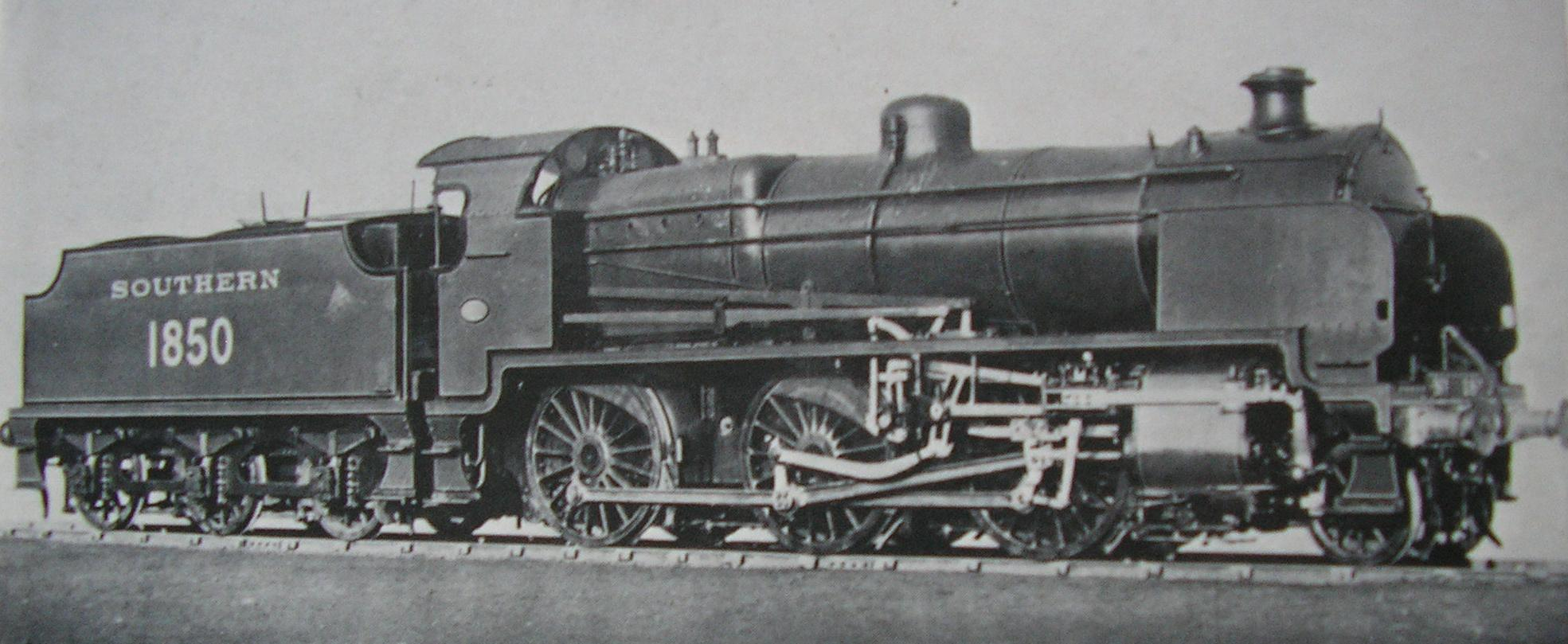
An official photograph of Woolwich-built No. 1850, which was fitted with Marshall valve gear for trials in 1934. Note the complex layout of the motion, which disintegrated at speed near Woking. The locomotive was subsequently rebuilt with standard Walschaerts valve gear in April 1934.

Although sufficient for the Southern Railway's needs, the N class was an ideal test-bed for experiments with new steam technology. The first experiment entailed fitting a Worthington feed pump to No. A819 in 1924. The trial was moderately successful, and the pump remained in use until removal in 1927. In June 1930, No. A816 was withdrawn from service for the application of experimental Anderson steam conservation equipment at Eastleigh Works. This was designed by a Scottish marine draughtsman, Mr. A.P.H. Anderson, who proposed the use of a fan system to condense spent steam and improve draughting of the fire on long-distance runs in regions with poor access to water.

No. A816 emerged from Eastleigh in August 1931 for trials, but was stopped when temperature variations within the condensing equipment caused water leakage. Modifications were made to improve the draughting of the locomotive, incorporating a box-like chimney attached to the condenser array by pipes. No. A816 was released for more trials, and produced performances well-below those displayed by the unmodified members of the class. The experiment was ended when the system's developers ran out of money, and the locomotive was converted back to standard form between May and August 1935, re-entering service as No. 1816.

The final experiment with performance enhancement began in October 1933, when No. 1850 had its Walschaerts valve gear replaced with J.T. Marshall valve gear at Eastleigh Works. The engine was trialled on the Western section, where the gear showed promise at slower speeds, with reduced consumption of coal and water. Problems were encountered at speeds over 50 mph (80 km/h), at which a severe "knocking" sound was reported by the footplate crew. When trialled on a Basingstoke–Waterloo semi-fast (a high-speed passenger train that stops at selected intermediate stations), the valve gear disintegrated near Woking. After immediate withdrawal from traffic, the locomotive had its Walschaerts valve gear re-fitted and No. 1850 re-entered traffic in April 1934.

=== Withdrawal ===
Suitable work for the class began to decline after completion of the Kent Coast route electrification in 1959. The reduction of work precipitated a phased reduction of the class that began with the withdrawal of No. 31409 in November 1962. The withdrawal programme intensified after boundary changes on the Southern Region placed the lines west of Salisbury under Western Region control in 1963. Class members based at Exmouth Junction shed were withdrawn in 1964, whilst the Southern Region's allocation was gradually replaced by Bulleid's Light Pacifics. The last operational members of the class were Nos. 31405 and 31408; both were withdrawn in June 1966.

Table of withdrawals
Year	Quantity in service at start of year	Quantity withdrawn	Locomotive numbers	Notes
1962	80	3	31823, 31409/14	
1963	77	25	31813/15/18/20/24–27/36/39/44/47/51–52/60–61/63/65/67/71–72, 31402–04/07	
1964	52	40	31810/12/14/17/19/21/28–30/32–35/37–38/40–41/43/45–46/48–50/53–57/59/64/68–70/74–75, 31400/06/10/12–13	
1965	12	6	31811/31/42/58/62, 31401	
1966	6	6	31816/66/73, 31405/08/11	

== Accidents and incidents ==
- On 4 April 1958, locomotive No. 31867 was hauling a parcels train that overran signals and collided with an electric multiple unit at Gloucester Road Junction, Croydon, Surrey. Nine people were injured.

== Livery and numbering ==
=== SECR and Southern Railway ===
N class locomotives were initially painted in an unlined dark grey livery with white lettering and numbering. This Maunsell grey livery was introduced by the SECR as a wartime economy measure. After Grouping in 1923, the Southern Railway replaced the different liveries of the constituent companies with a standard sage green livery (the colour was that previously used by Robert Urie on the LSWR) with black and white lining, primrose yellow numbering and "Southern" on the tender. This livery was first applied to No. 825.

From 1925, the class was repainted in a darker olive green livery, introduced by Maunsell, with plain white lining, black borders and primrose yellow markings. In 1939, shortly after the start of the Second World War, locomotives Nos. 1413 and 1850 were painted in unlined olive green because of labour shortages. In 1941, Nos. 1821, 1825, 1847, 1878 and 1403 were run in unlined olive green with Bulleid's gilt block lettering. Labour and paint shortages during the Second World War meant that all N class locomotives were painted in plain black by 1945. In 1946, two locomotives, Nos. 1817 and 1854, were repainted in Bulleid's malachite green livery, with yellow and black lining and "Sunshine" yellow lettering.

The 15 locomotives built by Ashford Works for the SECR between August 1917 and December 1923 were numbered 810–824. The Royal Arsenal batch of 50 locomotives purchased by the newly formed Southern Railway from 1923 were numbered A825–A875; the numbers followed consecutively from the Ashford batch but with a prefix "A" to denote a locomotive allocated for overhaul at Ashford Works. The prefix was gradually applied to the SECR batch. From 1928, a new system was adopted where all Southern Railway locomotives were renumbered into one sequence. The SECR and Woolwich N class batches became Nos. 1810–1875. The final batch of 15 locomotives, built between 1932 and 1934, were numbered 1400–1414 from new.

=== British Railways ===
The class was absorbed by British Railways in 1948, and initially given the power classification 4MT in 1949. Under British Railways ownership, the class was reclassified from 4MT to 4P5FB in 1953; the "B" denoting the brake power rating when used on unfitted (non-vacuum braked) goods trains. The locomotives at first retained their Southern Railway livery, but with "British Railways" painted on the tender in Bulleid block lettering. Eight locomotives had light repairs prior to 1950 and were given an "S" prefix to the Southern number (e.g. s1405). From 1949 to 1950 N class locomotives were repainted in the British Railways mixed-traffic lined black livery with red, cream and grey lining and the British Railways crest on the tender. Numbering was changed to the British Railways standard numbering system: the series 31810–31875 was allocated to the earlier locomotives, and 31400–31414 to the final 15.

== Operational assessment and preservation ==
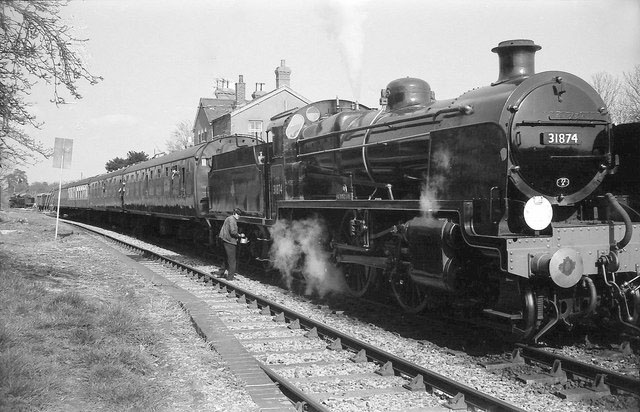
The only preserved N class locomotive, No. 31874, painted in early British Railways livery, at Ropley, on the Mid-Hants Railway, April 1978.

The N class was the first to combine Churchward design principles with the best practices of other railways; it was an important step in the development of the British 2-6-0, providing inspiration for the LMS Hughes Crab of 1926 and subsequent Maunsell designs. The locomotives were well received by crews, who nicknamed them "Woolworths", because the majority were fabricated from inexpensively produced parts from Woolwich. The robustness and reliability of the design ensured that their sphere of operation was expanded to cover most of the Southern Railway network. The utility of the N class as capable mixed-traffic locomotives ensured their continued use until withdrawal in 1966.

One member of the class is preserved, No. (3)1874, which was rescued in March 1974 from the Woodham Brothers scrapyard in Barry, Vale of Glamorgan, South Wales. One of the "Woolwich" batch, this locomotive was bought and restored for use on the Mid-Hants Railway; it was steamed for the first time in preservation in 1977, and was operational at the railway's re-opening as a heritage attraction in April 1977. The locomotive received two names during the late 1970s, the first one was Aznar Line, which was the shipping company that helped move the locomotives out of the scrapyard, and the second one was Brian Fisk who helped out with the locomotive's restoration. The locomotive was withdrawn in 1998 due to problems that require firebox reconstruction. In 2012, the locomotive was repainted into its SR Wartime Black guise of 1874 for the first time in decades. The locomotive was moved from the Mid-Hants Railway to the Swanage Railway in 2014 along with U Classes 31806 and 31625.

== Models ==
- Bachmann Branchline make a model of the N class in 00 gauge.
- Graham Farish make a model of the N class in N gauge.
