= Edgar Craven Bredin =

Edgar Craven Bredin (16 April 1886 – 5 August 1950) was an Irish mechanical and locomotive engineer and later a railway manager. Bredin was born in Canterbury on 16 April 1886 and educated at Mountjoy School in Dublin. In 1905 he was apprenticed to Fielding & Platt in Gloucester.

== Great Southern and Western Railway ==
In 1907, he became a pupil at Great Southern and Western Railway's Inchicore Works. He was appointed Assistant Works Manager at Inchicore in 1916, and was promoted to Works Manager in 1925. The Great Southern and Western Railway was amalgamed into the Great Southern Railways the same year. Bredin became Chief Mechanical Engineer of the GSR from 1937 to 1942 when he became General Manager. The GSR became part of Córas Iompair Éireann on 1 January 1945, and in the same year he became General Manager of CIÉ, and retired at the end of 1946. He died in Dublin on 5 August 1950.

== Locomotives ==
Bredin was noteworthy for introducing the largest steam locomotives to ever run on the Irish rail network. These were the GSR Class 800 three-cylinder 4-6-0 locomotives, the design work for which was carried out by Bredin's Chief Draughtsman, H J A Beaumont. Weighing in at over 130 tonnes, they were a full 20 tonnes heavier than the 201 Class, currently the largest diesel loco running on the Iarnród Éireann network.

Business positions
Preceded by A. W. Harty	Chief Mechanical Engineer of the Great Southern Railways; 1937–1942	Succeeded by M. J. Ginnetty
Preceded by W. H. Morton	General Manager of the Great Southern Railways; 1942–1944	'Company became part of Córal Iompair Éireann, which was incorporated in 1945 and nationalised in 1950-
New office	General Manager of Córas Iompair Éireann; 1945–1946	Succeeded by ?
