= William H. Morton =

British locomotive engineer

William Herbert Morton
- Born: 14 September 1877; Leeds, Yorkshire, England
- Died: 1947
- Education: Leeds University; Leeds School of Science and Technology
- Engineering career
- Discipline: Locomotive engineering
- Awards: Medalist (2nd UK) railway carriage and wagon construction

William Herbert Morton (14 September 1877–1947) was a British locomotive engineer who rose to the position of general manager of the Great Southern Railways (GSR) in Ireland. He previously held the chief engineering positions for GSR and Midland Great Western Railway (MGWR).

While Morton's only attributed design during his tenure of the top engineering positions was the MGWR Class F his business acumen, management qualities, influence on the upgrading of existing designs notably with regard to superheating and his influence on acquiring bargain surplus stock was of considerable benefit to the Irish locomotive fleet.

== Life ==
Morton had had an apprenticeship with Kitson and Company, Leeds and further education at the University of Leeds and Leeds School of Science and Technology. He rapidly attained the position of assistant Works Manager at Kitsons'. In 1900 he was appointed Chief Draughtsman at the Midland Great Western Railway in Ireland and quickly rose to be Works Manager at Broadstone Works. He was promoted to the position of first assistance locomotive engineer under Edward Cusack, contributing significantly to many designs and pioneered work on superheater development. He succeeded Cusack in 1915 as Locomotive Superintendent. His sole design was the MGWR Class F, however keen practical management skills and bargain surplus purchases, most notably the purchase of kits of parts for 12 Woolwich Moguls.

On the merger of the MGWR to form the GSR Morton initially was initially not preferred as Chief Mechanical Engineer, that role falling to J.R. Bazin of the Great Southern and Western Railway. Bazin had the advantage of already being based at Inchicore which was to be the lead works for the GSR. The need to balance senior roles between the companies may also have been an influence. When Bazin retired in 1929 Morton succeed him as Chief Mechanical Engineer for the GSR and focused on general fleet improvement including widespread rebuilds with superheating. From 1932 until retirement in 1942 Morton was appointed to the position of General Manager, a position he held until retirement in 1942.

== Engineering ==
Morton is particularly noted for his application of superheating to improve the performance of the existing locomotive fleet. He investigated superheating whilst at the MGWR and was supported by Cusack in 1915 in lodging a patent. The GSR Class 101, the numerically largest locomotive class in Ireland, was a particularly significant successfully example of improvement with superheater rebuild.

Morton's only locomotive design while in the top job was the MGWR Class F. Typically of Morton the design seemed optimised to make use of cheaply available war surplus supplies.

Business positions
Preceded by E. Cusack	Locomotive Engineer (Superintendent) of the Midland Great Western Railway; 1915–1924	Position discontinued in merger Company merged into Great Southern Railways
Preceded by J. R. Bazin	Chief Mechanical Engineer of the Great Southern Railways; 1930–1932	Succeeded by A. W. Harty
Preceded by C. E. Riley	General Manager of the Great Southern Railways; 1932–1942	Succeeded by E. C. Bredin
