= Henry Edward Cusack =

Irish mechanical engineer

- Born: 6 November 1865; Dublin, Ireland
- Died: 1954
- Engineering career
- Discipline: Locomotive engineering

Henry Edward Cusack (1865–1954) was a Locomotive Superintendent of the Midland Great Western Railway (MGWR).

== Life ==
Edward Cusack was born on 6 November 1865. He was educated at Clifton College, Bristol, England. His father, Sir Ralph Smith Cusack was Chairman of the MGWR from 1865 to 1905 and his brother-in-law, Major Major James William Henry Claud "H.C." Cusack was Deputy Chairman of the MGWR from 1905. His mother was Elizabeth Barker He served a four-year apprenticeship with Kitson and Company, England, followed by two years at Crewe, then returned to Ireland as a junior draughtsman in 1890. He married Constance Louisa Vernon in 1892. When Martin Atock announced his intended retirement from the MGWR Henry Edward Cusack was appointed his joint first assistant locomotive engineer with Basil Hope from the North Eastern Railway. Martin Atock's son, Thomas, was appointed as second assistant. Cusack rose to take the Chief Mechanical Engineers position from 1905 to 1915 and was replaced by the young draughtsman W. H. Morton who rose to support him.

== Engineering ==
Cusack oversaw the introduction of MGWR Class D on the transition from his predecessor Martin Atock. The first attributed locomotive to his era was the MGWR Class A, the largest 4-4-0 in Ireland at the time of its introduction in 1902. The smaller MGWR Class C 4-4-0 followed from 1909. His era also saw the MGWR Class B goods 0-6-0, an attempt at a larger freight engine. It is generally noted W. H. Morton is likely to have assisted Cusack with practical design input.

Cusack was responsible for the design of a Royal Train prepared for the visit of King Edward VII and Queen Alexandra in 1903 with a12 wheel saloon reputed to be the most luxurious in Ireland. As well as 6-wheel carriages he also designed the coaches for the MGWR "limited mail" express train in 1900. His coach designs typically had a distinct roof profile, somewhat flat for most of the top but tightly curved at the sides.

| Preceded by Martin Atock | Locomotive Superintendent of Midland Great Western Railway 1901-1915 | Succeeded by Walter H. Morton |
