= GSR Classes 372 and 393 =

Irish steam locomotive class

Great Southern Railways Classes 372 and 393
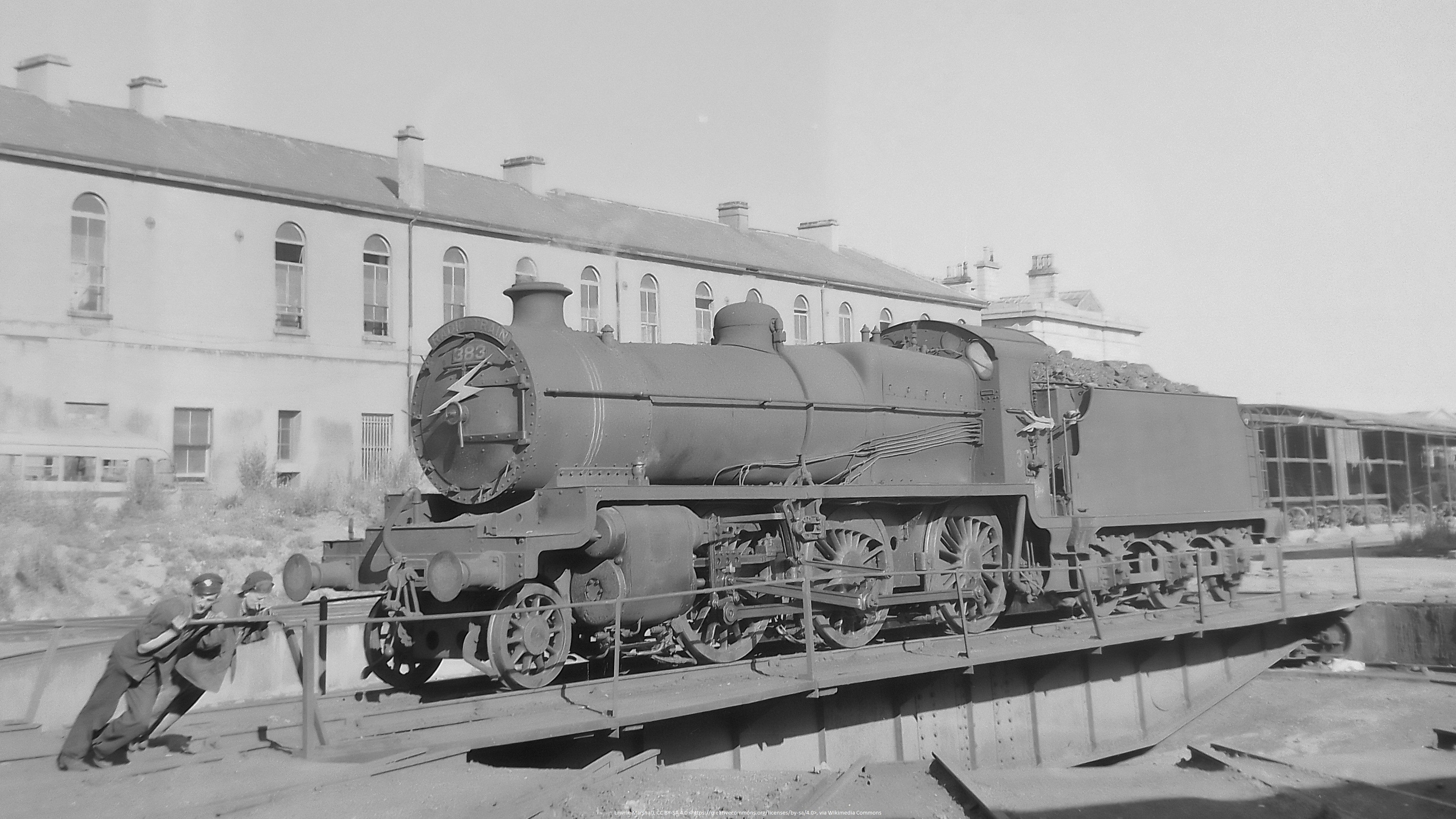
- No. 383 at Broadstone railway station on a Radio Train special.
Type and origin
- Power type: Steam
- Designer: R. E. L. Maunsell
- Builder: Woolwich Arsenal, Midland Great Western Railway, Great Southern Railway
- Build date: 372: 1925–1929; 393: 1930
- Total produced: 372: 20 (21st kit not built); 393: 6
Specifications
- Configuration
  - Whyte: 2-6-0
  - UIC: 1′C h2
- Gauge: 5 ft 3 in (1,600 mm)
- Driver dia.: 372: 5 ft 6 in (1,676 mm); 393: 6 ft 0 in (1,829 mm)
- Loco weight: 372: 62 long tons 4 cwt (139,300 lb or 63.2 t); 393: 62 long tons 7 cwt (139,700 lb or 63.4 t)
- Boiler pressure: 200 psi (1,379 kPa) (Note: Reduced to 180 psi (1,241 kPa) to prolong boiler life on some examples before being reverted by the 1930s.)
- Cylinders: Two
- Cylinder size: 19 in × 28 in (483 mm × 711 mm)
Performance figures
- Tractive effort: 372: 26,040 lbf (115.83 kN); 393: 23,870 lbf (106.18 kN)
Career
- Operators: MGWR → GSR → CIÉ
- Class: 372 or K1; 393 or K1a
- Numbers: 26
- Nicknames: Woolwiches; Woolworths
- Disposition: All scrapped

The Great Southern Railways Classes 372 and 393 were types of 2-6-0 ("mogul") steam locomotives exported to Ireland from Great Britain in 1924. They were designed by Richard Maunsell in 1914 for the South Eastern and Chatham Railway (SECR) to be members of the SECR N class of mixed-traffic engines. The GSR 372 and 393 classes were part of a batch of N and U class locomotive kits produced under a UK Government contract at the Royal Arsenal, Woolwich.

== Introduction and service with MGWR and GSR ==
Following the end of World War I, many munitions manufacturers (including the Royal Arsenal) had been made redundant, and it was proposed by the British government that they begin building steam locomotives instead. In November 1919, the Ministry of Munitions made an order for 50 2-6-0s and 50 2-8-0s to designs meant for a post-war nationalised railway system that hadn't materialised. The drawings were found to be incomplete and the order was amended to 100 locomotives of the SECR N class, a similar design.

The initial asking price for a locomotive and tender was £14,000, but with little interest the price soon fell. The first buyer was the Midland Great Western Railway, which bought 12 kits in March 1923 for £24,000. Even before the first kit had been assembled, the MGWR's successor, Great Southern Railways, expressed interest in acquiring more engines and in 1927 bought 15 more kits and four spare boilers for £34,000, an average cost of around £2,200 per locomotive — cheaper than it was to construct just one of the boilers.

The first entered service as MGWR number 49 but the company then became part of the new Great Southern Railways and the locomotive was renumbered 375 and the remaining 11 kits were completed as GSR engines. The final one of the batch, number 383, was the last locomotive completed at Broadstone. The GSR designated them Class 372 or Class K1.

As a result of their low chimneys, the locomotives tended to become quite dirty from the smoke. Although this was solved with the British examples by fitting smoke deflectors, no such action was taken. Their cabs, designed for the British loading gauge, were also considered cramped by Irish standards; despite this, the locomotives high route availability and capable steaming abilities earned it popularity with crews.

Being designed to operate freight services in Southern England, the class' abilities were stretched working heavy express trains. This was combatted by building the final six kits with 6 ft (1.8 m) driving wheels, essentially becoming the Irish equivalent of the SR U Class. The engines, numbered 393–398, became the Class 393. The number 392 was never assigned, but was probably meant for a spare kit that was rediscovered in Inchicore in 1963.

== Service and withdrawal with CIÉ ==
Córas Iompair Éireann succeeded the GSR in 1945 (and was nationalised in 1950), retaining the same classification system and numbering for its locomotives. In 1954 CIÉ withdrew four of the 1924 327s, but in the winter of 1954–55 CIÉ overhauled another seven of the class for further service.

Coal shortages during the harsh winter of 1946–47 led CIÉ to begin converting its locomotives to run on oil from 1947, although the lack of storage tanks in provincial depots meant the class was restricted from running more than 50 miles (80 km) out from Dublin. As fuel supplies stabilised, all the converted engines were reverted to using coal by the end of the decade.

In the 1950s CIÉ continued to operate freight trains without continuous brake. On 21 December 1955, number 375 was in charge of such an unfitted train consisting of 32 wagons laden with sugar beet. The train was on the line between Waterford and Limerick Junction on CIÉ's Southern section when it ran away descending the gradient to Cahir. The signalman diverted the runaway train into a siding to protect a mail train that was standing in the station. 375 smashed through the buffer stop at the end of the siding and onto the viaduct over the River Suir beyond the station, demolishing the first span of the viaduct. The locomotive and 22 of the wagons plunged into the river, killing the driver and fireman. 375 was recovered from the river but considered beyond economic repair and scrapped.

CIÉ withdrew the Class 393 and remaining Class 372 by 1965.

== Bibliography ==
- Baker, Michael HC (1972). Irish Railways Since 1916. Shepperton: Ian Allan. ISBN 0-7110-0282-7.
- Tatford, Barrington (1945). ABC of Irish Locomotives. Staines: Ian Allan.
- Swift, Peter (2012). Maunsell Moguls. Ian Allan. ISBN 9780711034006.
- Nock, O.S. (1983). Irish Steam. David & Charles. ISBN 0715379615.
- Clements, Jeremy; McMahon, Michael (2008). Locomotives of the GSR. Colourpoint Books. ISBN 978-1-906578-26-8.
