= Martin Atock =

Irish railway engineer

- Born: June 1834; Preston, Lancashire, England
- Died: 1901 (aged 66–67)
- Occupation: Engineer
- Engineering career
- Discipline: Locomotive engineering
- Projects: MGWR locomotives
- Significant design: 'Fly away' cab
- Significant advance: Standardisation; Regular stock renewal

Martin Atock, also formerly known as Martin Attock, was an English railway engineer, who is best known as the Locomotive Superintendent of the Midland Great Western Railway (MGWR) from 1872 to 1900.

== Life ==
Atock was born in June 1834 in Preston, Lancashire to George and Hephzibah Attock. His baptism took place in the parish church of Preston Minster on 26 June 1834 where the Reverend Roger Carus Wilson recorded his name as Martin Atock using the common spelling of the surname for the locality rather than that of his father. He moved to Stratford, London when his father George (Atock) Attock (Note: Shepherd (2009) p.14 George (Atock) Attock – exactly as it is written in the source.) became Carriage and Wagon Superintendent of the Eastern Counties Railway (ECR), a predecessor of the Great Eastern Railway. He followed father into railway engineering becoming a draftsman. (Note: Shepherd (2009) p.85 say Martin Atock joined the Great Eastern Railway, however than company was formed in 1862 a year after he left for Limerick) At a meeting of the ECR on 8 July 1857 he was appointed chief draughtsman at wages of £2 10s per week, and was noted as having resigned from the ECR as outdoor foreman of the locomotive department on 6 November 1861. He married in 1859.

In 1861, he relocated to Limerick, Ireland in 1861 to take up an appointment as Locomotive Superintendent to the Waterford, Limerick and Western Railway. Whilst there he organised a reading room for the locomotive men at Limerick; incorporated a new wage structure, and persuaded the directors to reduce the weekly working hours down from 58 to the recommended 54 hours per week. His final post was of Locomotive Superintendent of the Midland Great Western Railway at Broadstone works from 1872. Following his retirement in 1900 he died in November 1901 following a short trip to London.

== Family ==
Several members of the Atock/Attock family were involved in railway engineering, including his son Thomas on the MGWR and his younger brother (Note: Shepherd (2009) p.14 show on a family tree the family link between Martin Atock and Frederick Attock (with two 't'), his younger brother who lived and died in England, both sons of railway engineer George (Atock) Attock – exactly as it is written in the source.) Frederick Attock of the Lancashire and Yorkshire Railway.

== Engineering ==
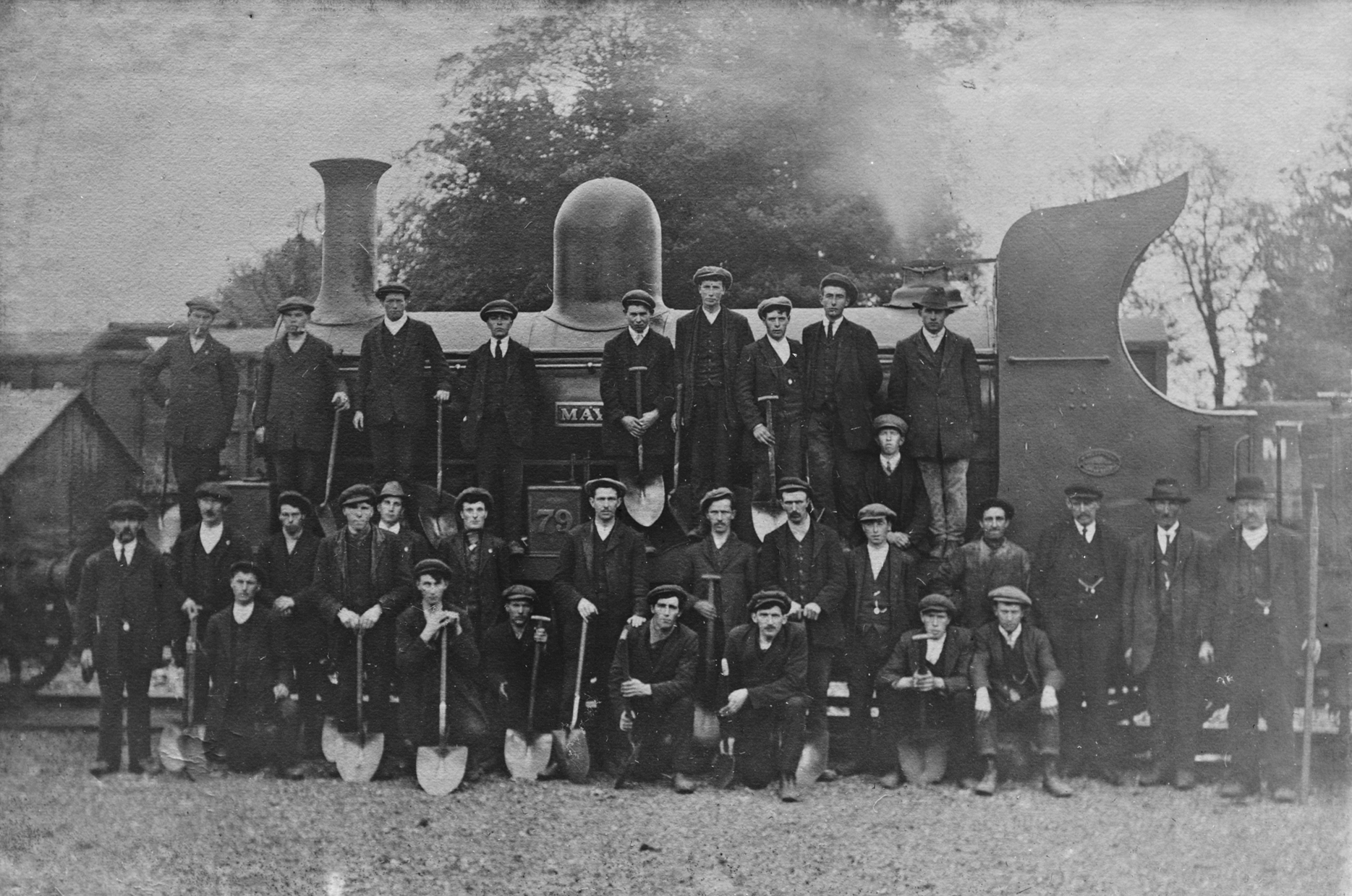
Martin Atock MGWR Class Lm No. 79 'Mayo' with distinctive Atock 'fly away' cab and railway workers

The fly-away cab was the most distinctive attribute of a Martin Atock locomotive. They were problematic running in reverse and new locomotives and rebuilds after his departure quickly changed to a conventional square cab design.

Atock is credited with bringing a degree of standardisation to the MGWR. He implemented a policy of renewing or rebuilding rolling stock every 20 years or so. He was aided by the expansion of Broadstone works in 1878 making it more suitable for the construction of locomotives.

It can be said Atock never designed as bad locomotive at the MGWR. He moved away from the 4-2-0 preference of his predecessor, favoured 0-6-0 for freight and 2-4-0 for passenger/mixed passenger during his tenure. He produced a useful 0-6-0T for branch and shunting. He seemed to avoid 4-4-0 and all bogie designs until the final design of his era, there are various speculations whether this was due to the influence of his successor Cusack or the success of the 4-4-0 elsewhere. On his retirement all MGWR locomotives were of his design apart from MGWR Class H that he had recommended be purchased for a bargain price.

== Sources ==
- Clements, Jeremy; McMahon, Michael (2008). Locomotives of the GSR. Colourpoint Books. ISBN 9781906578268.
- Jones, Harry; ECR (2019). File E Engineering & Traffic Committees 1849-50 & 1857-1862 (PDF) (Report). Archived from the original (PDF) on 12 November 2019.
- Shepherd, Ernie (1994). The Midland Great Western Railway of Ireland - An illustrated History. Midland Publishing Limited. ISBN 1-85780-008-7.
- Shepherd, Ernie (2006). Waterford Limerick & Western Railway. ISBN 0-7110-3147-9.
- Shepherd, Ernie (2009). The Atock/Attock Family: A Worldwide Railway Engineering Dynasty. Vol. 150. Oakwood Library of Railway History. ISBN 978-0853616818.

Preceded by Robert Ramage	Locomotive Superintendent of Midland Great Western Railway 1872-1900	Succeeded by Edward Cusack
