= Broadstone railway works =

Railway workshop in Dublin, Ireland

Broadstone Railway Works
- Coordinates: 53.357°N 6.275°W
- Industry: Rail transport
- Products: Locomotives
- Owners: GS&WR (1844-1924); Great Southern (1925-1944); CIÉ (From 1945)
- Defunct: 1961

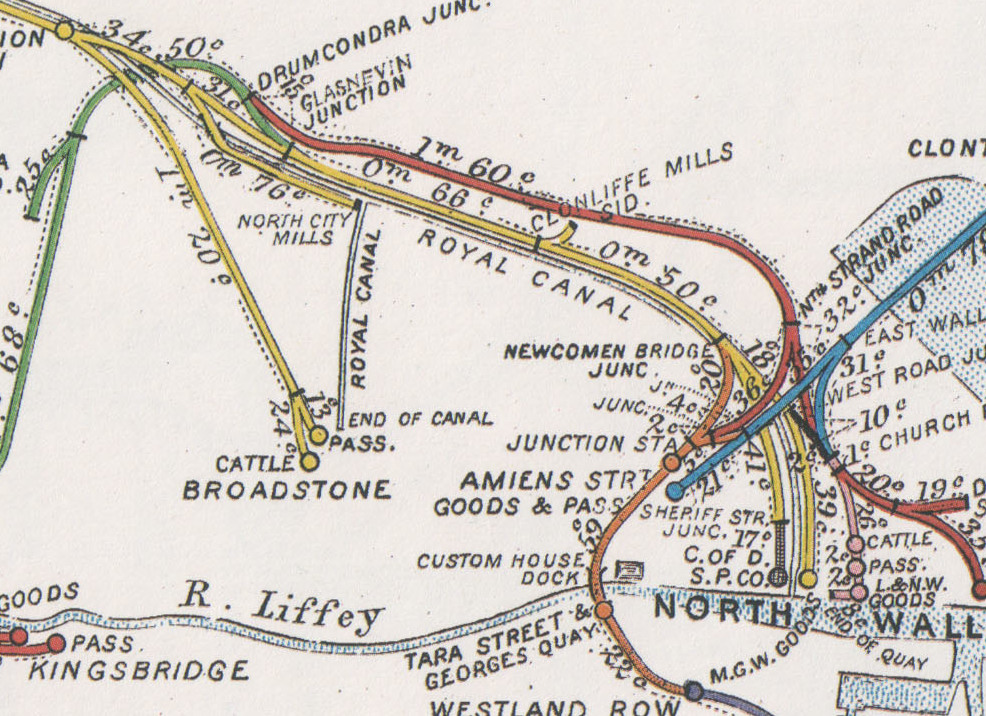
Dublin railway map showing Broadstone circa 1914

Broadstone railway works or simply Broadstone or the Broadstone was the headquarters for mechanical engineering and rolling stock maintenance for Midland Great Western Railway (MGWR). The complex grew around the Dublin Broadstone railway terminus.

== History ==
The first railway construction on the site was by J.S. Dawson, later to become Rogerson, Dawson an Russell. Two first class coaches are noted as ordered from the firm in 1839 by the Eastern Counties Railway of England at a cost of £420 each. The firms workshops were later purchased and incorporated in Broadstone Works in 1851.

From basic beginnings around the Dublin terminus serving the basic of the newly created railway in the late 1840s the works had grown and become cramped by 1869/70. The works were extended in 1877 allowing space for locomotive building and assembly with No. 49, Marquis being the first built there in 1879. A further 119 engines were built or constructed at Broadstone until the MGWR's amalgamation to form Great Southern Railways (GSR) in 1925. The GSR's Inchicore works was expanded with a new erecting shop and from 1928 the assembly of the GSR Class 372 2-6-0 Woolwich Moguls was switched from Broadstone. Engineering work was thereafter switched from Broadstone, with the works and station closing in the 1930s but with the steam locomotive depot remaining active until 1961. The wagon works resumed wagon building after a gap in 1950, with over one hundred cattle trucks constructed.

== Site ==
The site evolved around the Broadstone railway station to serve the requirements of the MGWR and also incorporated a steam servicing depot. By 1920 the site had reached its full extent. A set of buildings to the north of the station and the west of the main line housed locomotive, boiler, carriage, machine and paint shops. A locomotive semi roundhouse and large turntable lay to the east of the station and a locomotive shed to the north of that. These were for day to day servicing of steam locomotives. To the south of the station accessed by a line passing by the locomotive sheds and over a filled in dock of the Royal Canal lay the wagon build and repair shops.

=== Present day ===
After the depot closed to steam the site was generally given over to omnibuses with a LUAS line from central Dublin running past the south front of the station and up the west side then on the old main line towards Liffey Junction. The wagon shops to the south of the station have been replaced by the Dublin Bus Phibsborough depot. Bus Éireann occupies the substantial part of the remainder of the site with buildings in the north east of the site and areas to the north and west of the station paved over for parking with the locomotive depot buildings having been demolished.

== Sources ==
- Baker, Michael H.C. (1972). Irish railways since 1916. Ian Allan. ISBN 0711002827.
- Clements, Jeremy; McMahon, Michael (2008). Locomotives of the GSR. Colourpoint Books. ISBN 9781906578268.
- Shepherd, Ernie (1994). The Midland Great Western Railway of Ireland - An illustrated History. Midland Publishing Limited. ISBN 1-85780-008-7.
- Shepherd, Ernie (2009). The Atock/Attock Family: A Worldwide Railway Engineering Dynasty. Vol. 150. Oakwood Library of Railway History. ISBN 978-0853616818.
