= Great Southern Railways =

Irish railway company (1925–1944)

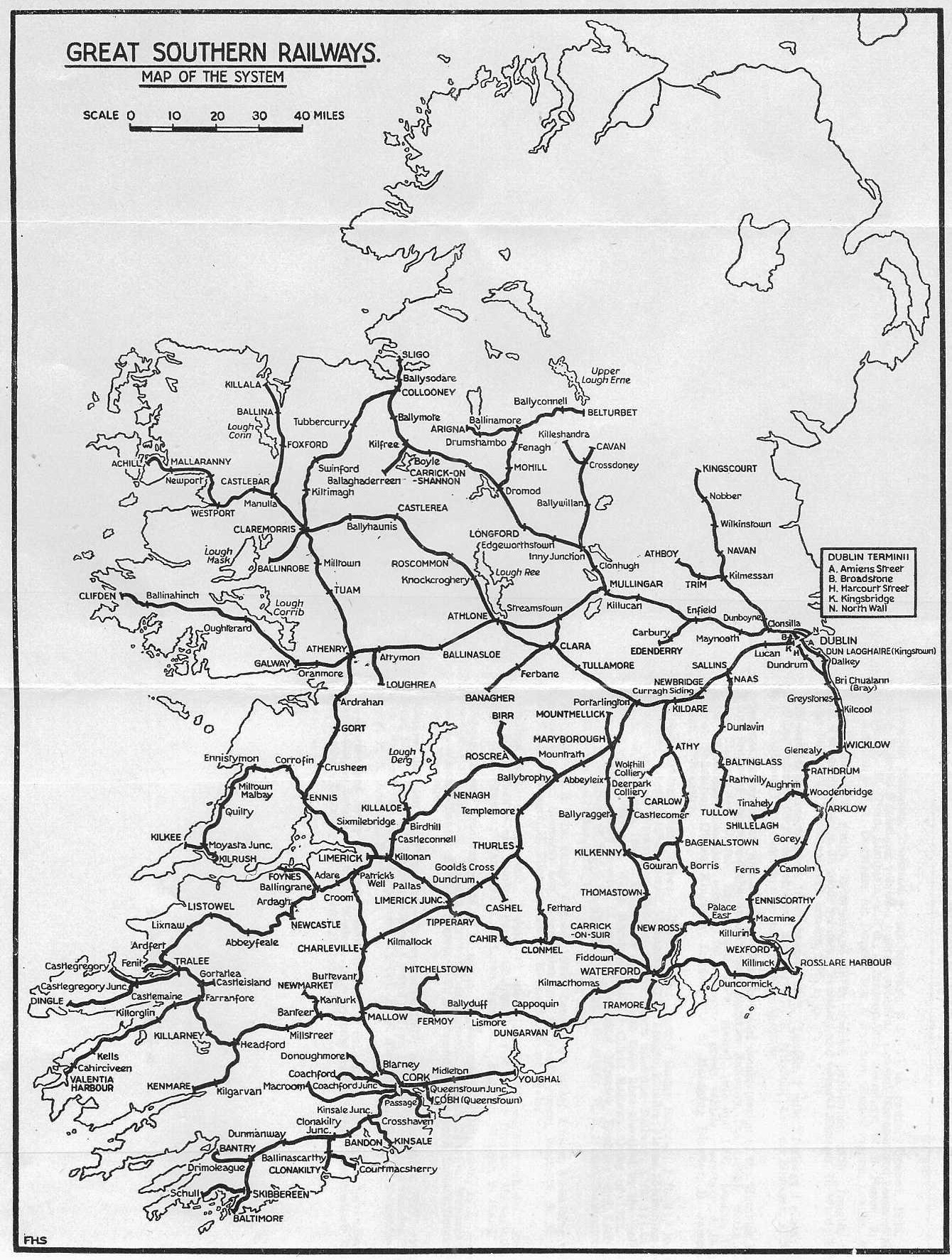
- 1926 map of GSR

Overview
- Dates of operation: 12 November 1924–31 December 1944
- Predecessor: Midland Great Western Railway; Great Southern and Western Railway; Dublin and South Eastern Railway; Cork, Bandon and South Coast Railway and others
- Successor: CIÉ Railways Division (1945-1987); Irish Rail (1987-present)

Technical
- Track gauge: 5 ft 3 in (1,600 mm); 3 ft (914 mm)
- Length: 2,181 miles 28 chains (3,510.5 km) (1925)
- Track length: 2,927 miles 36 chains (4,711.3 km) (1925)

The Great Southern Railways (GSR) was an Irish company that from 1924 until 1945 owned and operated most of the railways that lay wholly within the Irish Free State (the present-day Republic of Ireland).

The period was difficult with rising operating costs and static to failing income. The early part of the period was soon after infrastructure losses of the Irish Civil War. The Emergency or Second World War at the end of the period saw shortages of coal and raw materials with increased freight traffic and restricted passenger traffic.

== History ==
=== Context ===
Civil unrest in Ireland had led to the assumption of governmental control of all railways operating in the Island of Ireland on 22 December 1916 through the Irish Railways Executive Committee, later succeeded by the Ministry of Transport. Control was returned to the management of the companies on 15 August 1921. The Anglo-Irish Treaty of December 1921 establishing the Irish Free State and subsequent Irish Civil War all combined to be damaging to the railways of Ireland widespread and extensive damage to infrastructure and rolling stock. Between 1916 and 1921 revenues had doubled while operating costs and wages had quadrupled. When the GS&WR, by far the largest of the companies, announced it would cease operations on 8 January 1923. The Irish Free State had already recognised the importance of the railway system and had set up the Railway Commission to advise on ownership in April 1922. The impending collapse led to the process that was to create the GSR.

=== Formation ===
Provision for the creation of the company was made by the Railways Act 1924, which mandated the amalgamation (in the case of the four major railway companies) and absorption (of the 22 smaller companies) of all railways wholly within the Irish Free State. Only cross-border railways, most notably the Great Northern Railway (GNR) and the Sligo, Leitrim and Northern Counties Railway (SL&NCR), remained outside its control.

==== First amalgamation ====
The Great Southern and Western Railway, the Midland Great Western Railway and the Cork, Bandon and South Coast Railway agreed to terms for amalgamation, forming the Great Southern Railway by way of secondary legislation. (Note: The Railways (Great Southern) Preliminary Amalgamation Scheme, 1924)

==== DSER joins ====
The Great Southern Railways was formed when the fourth major company, the Dublin and South Eastern Railway (DSER), joined these companies. (Note: The Great Southern Railways Amalgamation Scheme, 1925) The DSER was substantially British-owned and had wished to merge with the GNR but was overruled.

==== Smaller companies ====
The smaller companies were absorbed under several successive statutory instruments. (Note: The Great Southern Railways Supplemental Amalgamation Scheme, 1925 The Great Southern Railways Absorption (No. 1) Scheme, 1925 The Great Southern Railways Absorption (No. 2) Scheme, 1925 The Great Southern Railways Absorption (No. 3) Scheme, 1925 The Great Southern Railways Absorption (No. 4) Scheme, 1925 The Great Southern Railways Absorption (No. 5) Scheme, 1925)

List of companies amalgamated to form Great Southern Railway/Great Southern Railways
Company	Operator	Gauge	Route Miles	Locomotives	Notes
Argina Colliery Extension Railway	CLR	3 ft (914 mm)	4	0	
Athy Wolfhill Colliery Railway	GSWR	5 ft 3 in (1,600 mm)	12	0	
Athenry and Tuam Extension Railway	GSWR	5 ft 3 in (1,600 mm)	17	0	
Bantry Extension Railway (CBSCR)	CBSCR	5 ft 3 in (1,600 mm)	11	0	Operated by Cork, Bandon and South Coast Railway
Ballinrobe and Claremorris Light Railway	MGWR	5 ft 3 in (1,600 mm)	12	0	Nominally 12 miles
Baltimore Extension Railway	CBSCR	5 ft 3 in (1,600 mm)	8	0	
Castlecomer Railway	GSWR	5 ft 3 in (1,600 mm)	12	0	Nominally 12 miles
Cavan and Leitrim Railway (CLR)	CLR	3 ft (914 mm)	59	9	
Clonakilty Extension Railway	CBSCR	5 ft 3 in (1,600 mm)	9	0	
Cork, Bandon and South Coast Railway (CBSCR)	CBSCR	5 ft 3 in (1,600 mm)	94	20	
Cork, Blackrock and Passage Railway (CPBR)	CBPR	3 ft (914 mm)	16	4	
Cork and Macroom Direct Railway (CMDR)	CMDR	5 ft 3 in (1,600 mm)	24	5	CMDR tried to avoid joining GSR by physical independence
Cork and Muskerry Light Railway (CMLR)	CMLR	3 ft (914 mm)	11	7	
Cork City Railways		5 ft 3 in (1,600 mm)	1	0	Tramway connecting docks, CBSCR and GSWR, mileage nominal
Donoughmore Extension Light Railway	CMLR	3 ft (914 mm)	8	0	
Dublin and Kingstown Railway	DSER	5 ft 3 in (1,600 mm)	6	0	
Dublin and South Eastern Railway (DSER)	DSER	5 ft 3 in (1,600 mm)	161	41	Route mileage may include closures and operational track
Fishguard and Rosslare Railways and Harbours Company	GSWR	5 ft 3 in (1,600 mm)	104	0	50% joint GSR/Great Western Railway
Great Southern and Western Railway (GSWR)	GSWR	5 ft 3 in (1,600 mm)	1100	326	Route mileage may include closures and operational track
Loughrea and Attymon Light Railway	MGWR	5 ft 3 in (1,600 mm)	9	0	
Midland Great Western Railway (MGWR)	MGWR	5 ft 3 in (1,600 mm)	538	139	Route mileage may include closures and operational track
South Clare Railway	WCR	3 ft (914 mm)		0	
Schull and Skibbereen Railway (SSR)	SSR	3 ft (914 mm)	15	4	Company was West Carberry Tramways and Light Railways Co. Ltd.
Southern of Ireland Railway	GSWR	5 ft 3 in (1,600 mm)	28	0	
Timoleague and Courtmacsherry Light Railway (TCLR)	TCLR	5 ft 3 in (1,600 mm)	9	2	
Tralee and Dingle Light Railway (TDLR)	TDLR	3 ft (914 mm)	38	8	
Tralee and Fenit Railway	GSWR	5 ft 3 in (1,600 mm)	7	0	Mileage nominal
West Clare Railway (WCR)	WCR	3 ft (914 mm)	27	11	
Waterford and Tramore Railway (WTR)	WTR	5 ft 3 in (1,600 mm)	7	4	

==== Omissions and anomalies ====
CIÉ previously maintained a full online list of the twenty five companies which constituted the Great Southern Railways in 1925. This is not entirely accurate, as it includes the Fishguard & Rosslare Railways & Harbours Company which still exists today, although GSR took over 50% of its shares upon its creation, the other 50% being held by the UK Great Western Railway. The respective shareholdings in the company, now essentially a shelf company, are held today by Iarnród Éireann and Stena Line.

Two companies that were not amalgamated but whose tracks the GSR retained operating rights over were the City of Dublin Junction Railway, (Note: Westland Row to Amiens St.) and the New Ross and Waterford Extension.

Three railways remained completely outside of the amalgamation process, despite lying wholly within the Free State. These were the Listowel and Ballybunion Railway, the Dublin and Blessington Steam Tramway and the Dublin and Lucan Electric Railway.

=== Early years ===
The GS&WR was the dominant constituent in terms of area, route millage and rolling stock. The GSR's headquarters were established at Kingsbridge and Inchicore became the chief engineering works. The former Dublin and South Eastern section in particular had become extremely run down and needed extensive remedial work on its rolling stock with about one-third condemned with immediate effect. Revenue for passengers decreased from £1.91m in 1925 to £1.28m by 1931, that for freight decreasing from £2.27m to £2.05m.

=== Buses and hotels ===
From 1929, when it acquired a stake in the Irish Omnibus Company, the company also ran bus services. These operations became the responsibility, from 1 January 1934, of the Great Southern Railways Omnibus Department.

The group owned a number of hotels, and in 1990 the hotel group was transferred from Córas Iompair Éireann to Aer Rianta, in the ownership of which it remained until 2006. The hotel group formed by the company, Great Southern Hotels, continued to bear that name until its privatisation in 2006. Only the Sligo hotel continued to use the Great Southern name as of 2016, but in January 2018 The Malton Hotel in Killarney reverted to its original name of the Great Southern.

=== 1930s ===
Worldwide economic conditions continued to be difficult and affected Ireland also, passenger and freight revenue decreased to £1.27m and £2.05m by 1939.

=== Second World War ===
Although the Republic of Ireland was a neutral country, railway transport was severely disrupted by The Emergency. The lack of high-quality coal fuel in Ireland and the need to import from England was severe and desperate alternatives such as turf-burning had only extremely limited success. By 1944 most non-suburban passenger services were restricted to Mondays and Thursdays only with some curtailed altogether.

=== Transfer to CIÉ ===
The Transport Act 1944 dissolved the company and transferred its assets, together with those of the Dublin United Transport Company to Córas Iompair Éireann, from 1 January 1945.

== Route network ==
Over the period of the GSR's existence, the total route network was reduced slightly from 2,181 miles (3,510 km) in 1925 to 2,042 miles (3,286 km) at the end in 1944. Among the few lines closed in the intervening years were the former Midland Great Western lines from Galway to Clifden (in 1935) and from Westport to Achill (in 1937).

The stretch of line that was double track was reduced more significantly, from 438 miles (705 km) to 276 miles (444 km) in the same period.

== Locomotives and rolling stock ==
=== Locomotives ===
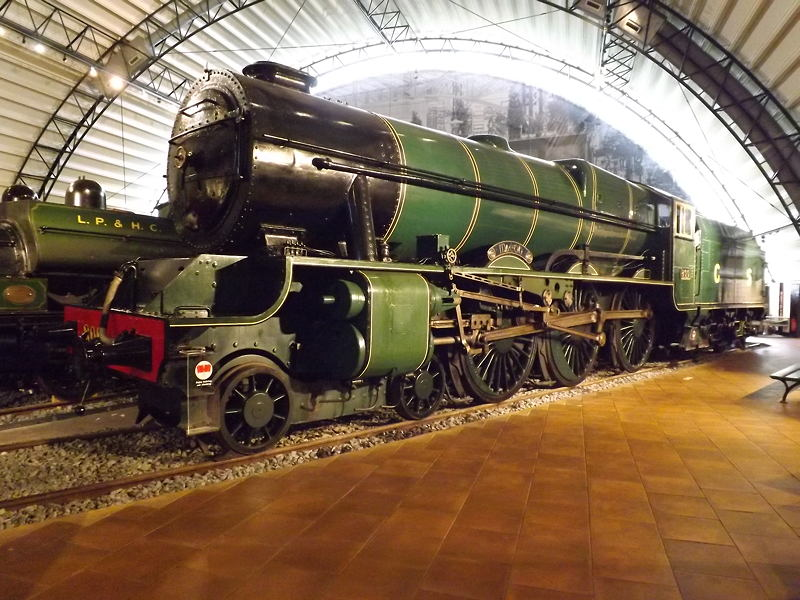
GSR 4-6-0 locomotive "Maeḋḃ", preserved at the Ulster Folk and Transport Museum

A wide variety of locomotives and rolling stock was inherited from the constituent companies. 1925 records show 526 broad and 41 narrow gauge steam locomotives remaining inherited from the originating companies. Locomotives were renumbered into the GSR class number scheme whereby the lowest numbered engine in the class was used as the class identity. There was a parallel Inchicore scheme that used a letter to indicate the axle layout and a number to designate different groups within the class.

When the GSR passed into CIÉ at the end of 1944 the total number of broad gauge steam locomotives was about 475 of which 58 had been built by GSR. About 28 narrow gauge steam locomotives remained.

=== Rolling stock ===
The total number of passenger vehicles including post office, parcel, and brake vans was 1670 in 1925, falling to 1337 by 1944.

=== Preservation ===
3 of its carriages survive.

- No. 1144 - Cavan and Leitrim Railway. Built 1935. Grounded.
- No. 1325 - West Clare Railway. Built 1935. Grounded.
- No. 1335 - Railway Preservation Society of Ireland. Built 1937. Operational.

=== Railcars ===
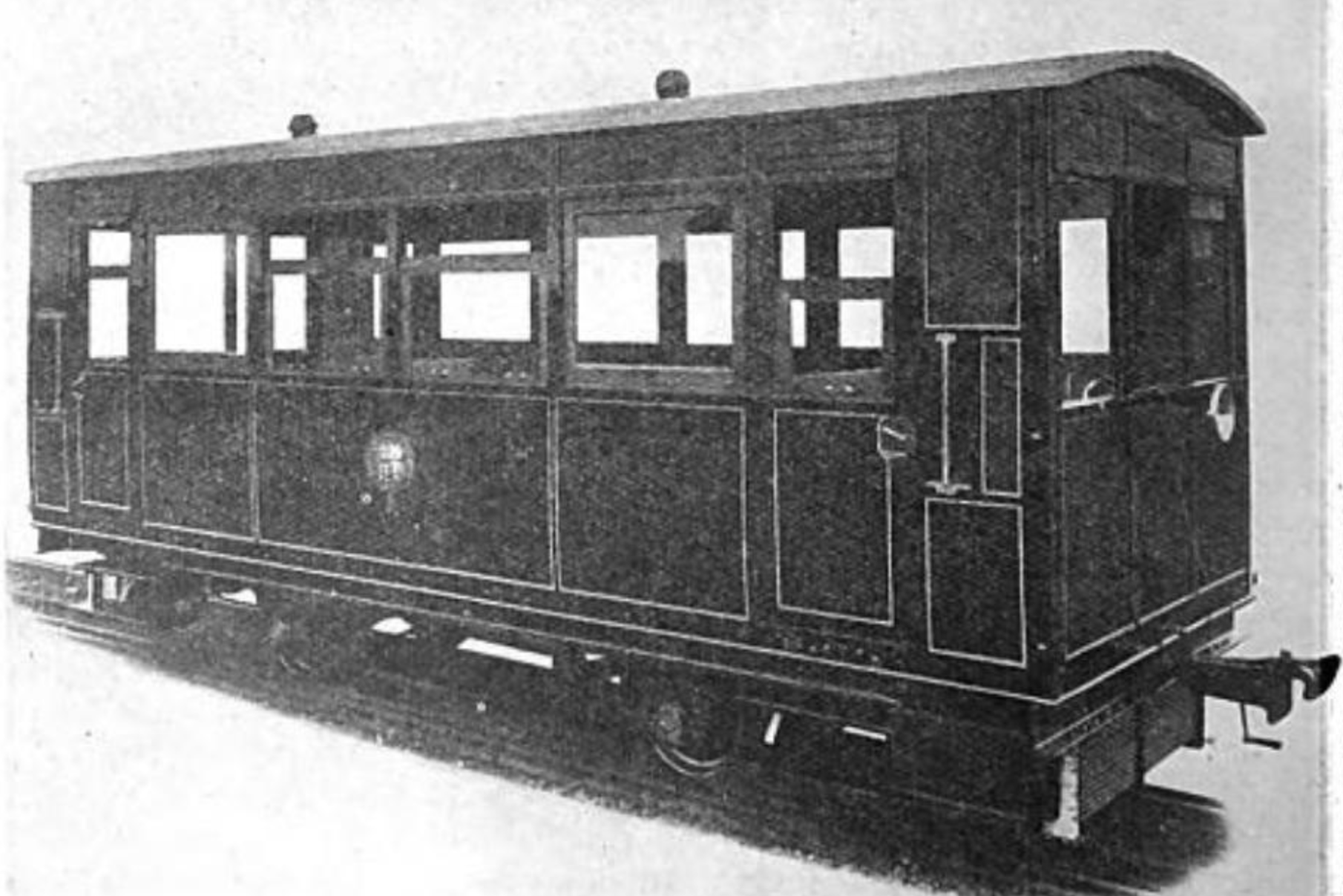
One of the 3ft gauge Drewry railcars

The GSR introduced four Sentinel steam railcars in 1928 with power units similar to the GSR Class 280, operating range of over 150 miles (240 km) and a passenger capacity of 55. All were withdrawn in the early 1940s. A subsequent order from Claytons in 1928 was less successful and withdrawn in 1932. A model exists in the Fry railway collection. Four Drewry petrol-powered railcars, of which two were narrow gauge, were also introduced around 1927, with all four also being withdrawn by the mid 1940s. The innovative Drumm Battery Train was successfully operated on the Dublin—Bray route from 1932.

== Senior people ==
General Manager

- C. E. Riley
- W. H. Morton (1932-1942)
- Edgar Craven Bredin (1942—1944)

Chief Mechanical Engineer/Locomotive Superintendent

- J. R. Bazin (1925—1929)
- W. H. Morton (1930—1932)
- A. W. Harty (1932—1937)
- Edgar Craven Bredin (1937—1942)
- J. M. Ginnetty (1942—1944)
- C.F. Tindall (1944)

== See also ==
- History of rail transport in Ireland
- Rail transport in Ireland
- Iarnród Éireann
