= Midland Great Western Railway =

Former railway company in Ireland

- Lines owned by MGWR; Lines worked by MGWR but owned by other companies (Note: Claremorris to Ballinrobe owned by Ballinrobe and Claremorris Light Railway. Loughrea branch owned by Loughrea and Attymon Light Railway)

Overview
- Headquarters: Dublin
- Dates of operation: 1845–1924
- Successor: Great Southern Railways

Technical
- Track gauge: 1,600 mm (5 ft 3 in)
- Length: 538 miles 6 chains (865.9 km) (1919)
- Track length: 786 miles 39 chains (1,265.7 km) (1919)

The Midland Great Western Railway (MGWR) was the third largest Irish gauge (1,600 mm (5 ft 3 in)) railway company in Ireland. It was incorporated in 1845 and absorbed into the Great Southern Railways in 1924. At its peak the MGWR had a network of 538 miles (866 km), making it Ireland's third largest network after the Great Southern and Western Railway (GS&WR) and the Great Northern Railway of Ireland.

The MGWR served part of Leinster, County Cavan in Ulster and much of Connacht. Its network was entirely within what in 1922 became the Irish Free State.

== Early development ==
The Great Southern and Western Railway, as evidenced by its name, was formed with an ambition to develop a railway network across much of Ireland, including Connacht. In its initial years, the company focused on developing a Dublin–Cork route at the expense of expansion westward, causing discontent among some of the company's directors. Four directors, unhappy with the lack of progress towards reaching Galway, resigned from the board to pursue a venture titled the Great Western (Ireland) Railway (GWIR).

Not long after, a group called the Irish Great Western Railway (IGWR) splintered off the GWIR. While the GWIR had proposed to build its own separate Dublin terminus, the IGWR planned to branch off from the GSWR and use its Kingsbridge terminus, in turn receiving the GSWR's support. Bills for the competing projects went before parliament in 1845, and subsequently the GWIR's (by then MGWR) bill was passed while the IGWR's was rejected.

The Midland Great Western Railway of Ireland Act 1845 (8 & 9 Vict. c. cxix) received royal assent in July 1845, authorising it to raise £1,000,000 capital and to build a railway from Dublin to Mullingar and Longford, and to buy the Royal Canal. Construction of the main line began from Dublin in January 1846 and proceeded westwards in stages, supervised by chief engineer G. W. Hemans. It opened from Dublin Broadstone as far as Enfield in May 1847, to Hill of Down in December 1847 and to Mullingar in October 1848.

=== Dublin to Galway ===
Rivalry existed between the MGWR and the GS&WR, each of which wanted to build the line to Galway. The MGWR extended its line from Mullingar and the GS&WR from its line at Portarlington. The MGWR was first, going via Athlone and reaching Galway, 126.5 miles (203.6 km) from Dublin, in August 1851. It was not until 1859 that the GS&WR reached Athlone. The GS&WR was obliged to operate its service over MGWR track between Athlone and Galway, paying the MGWR 65% of passenger and 55% of goods receipts. The GS&WR retained a separate station, which is now the sole operating station, as the last service to the MGWR station ran on 13 January 1985. The branch is to be made into a rail trail as part of the Dublin-Galway Greenway by 2020.

=== Galway to Clifden ===
In 1890 the government granted the MGWR £264,000 to build a railway to Clifden on the Atlantic coast of County Galway. It opened as far as Oughterard in January 1895 and to Clifden in July 1895. Due to its inland route, it did not serve the bulk of the area's population, so the GSR closed it in 1935. In recent years reopening of the line is on the agenda but was postponed during Covid-19 in the early 2020s.

A similar branch line was built at the same time from Westport to Achill on the Atlantic coast of County Mayo. The MGWR built the first section, opening it as far as Newport in February 1894 and Mulranny in May 1894. The Board of Works built the section from Mulranny to Achill, which opened in May 1895. The GSR closed the line in 1937.

=== Branch lines ===
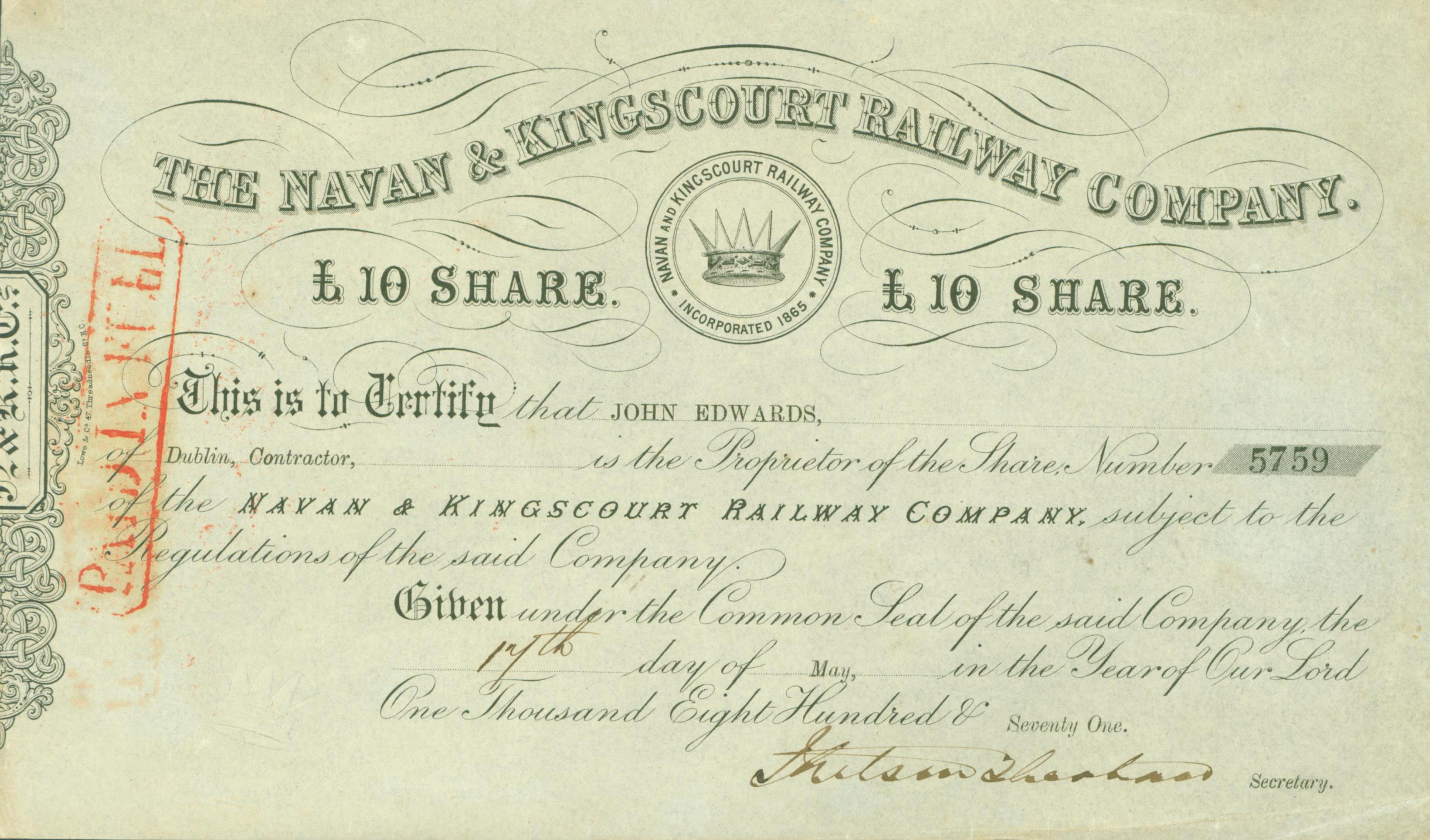
Share of the Navan & Kingscourt Railway Company, issued 17 May 1871

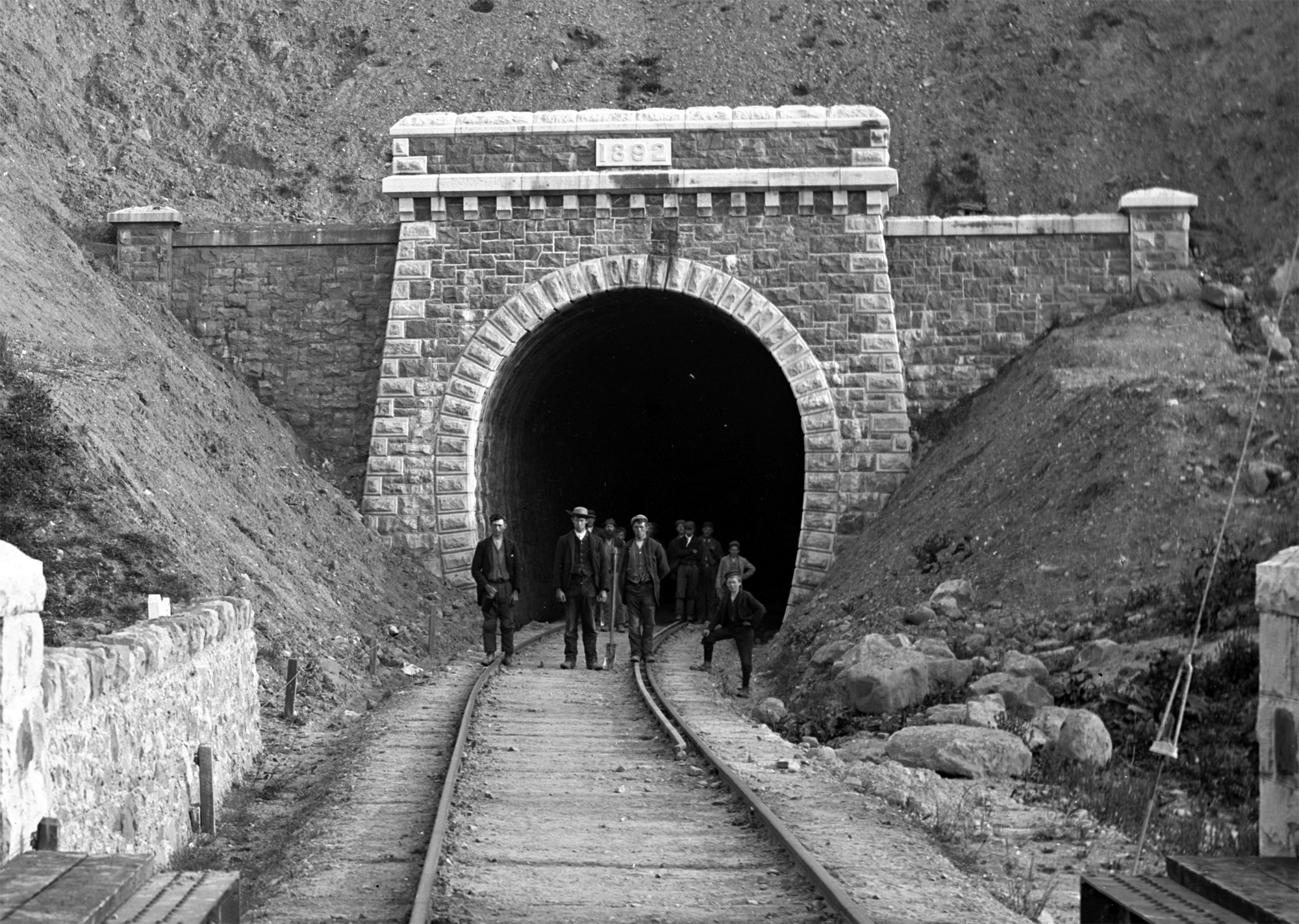
Tunnel at Newport on the Westport to Achill branch line

At its peak the MGWR had a number of branch lines:

- Clonsilla to Navan – opened as the Dublin and Meath Railway in 1862, leased to the MGWR under the Dublin and Meath Railway (Working Agreement) Act 1869 (32 & 33 Vict. c. xiii), sold to the MGWR under the Midland Great Western, Dublin and Meath, and Navan and Kingscourt Railways (Purchase) Act 1888 (51 & 52 Vict. c. lxxi))
  - extension from Navan to Kingscourt – opened by the Navan and Kingscourt Railway in 1865, sold to the MGWR in 1888
- Kilmessan Junction to Athboy (opened 1864, closed 1963)
- Nesbitt Junction (near Enfield) to Edenderry (opened 1877, closed 1963)
- Streamstown to Clara, County Offaly (authorised by the Midland Great Western Railway of Ireland (Streamstown and Clara Junction) Act 1857 (20 & 21 Vict. c. cxiii), opened 1863, closed 1963)
- Attymon Junction to Loughrea (light railway worked by the MGWR, opened 1890, closed 1975)
- Galway to Clifden (opened 1895, closed 1935)
- Westport to Achill (opened 1895, closed 1937)
- Inny Junction to Cavan Town (opened 1856, closed 1960)
- Kilfree Junction to Ballaghaderreen (opened by the Sligo and Ballaghaderreen Railway in 1874, sold to the MGWR under the Midland Great Western Railway of Ireland Act 1877 (40 & 41 Vict. c. cxxxix), closed 1963)
- Crossdoney to Killeshandra (opened 1886, closed 1960)
- Athlone to Westport (opened by the Great Northern and Western Railway between 1860–66, leased to the MGWR under the Great Northern and Western (of Ireland) Railway (Lease) Act 1870 (33 & 34 Vict. c. ci), sold to the MGWR under the Midland Great Western and Great Northern and Western of Ireland Railways (Amalgamation) Act 1890 (53 & 54 Vict. c. lxxvi))
- Claremorris to Ballinrobe (light railway worked by the MGWR, opened 1892, closed 1960)
- Manulla to Ballina, County Mayo (opened 1873)
  - extension from Ballina to Killala (opened 1893, closed 1937)

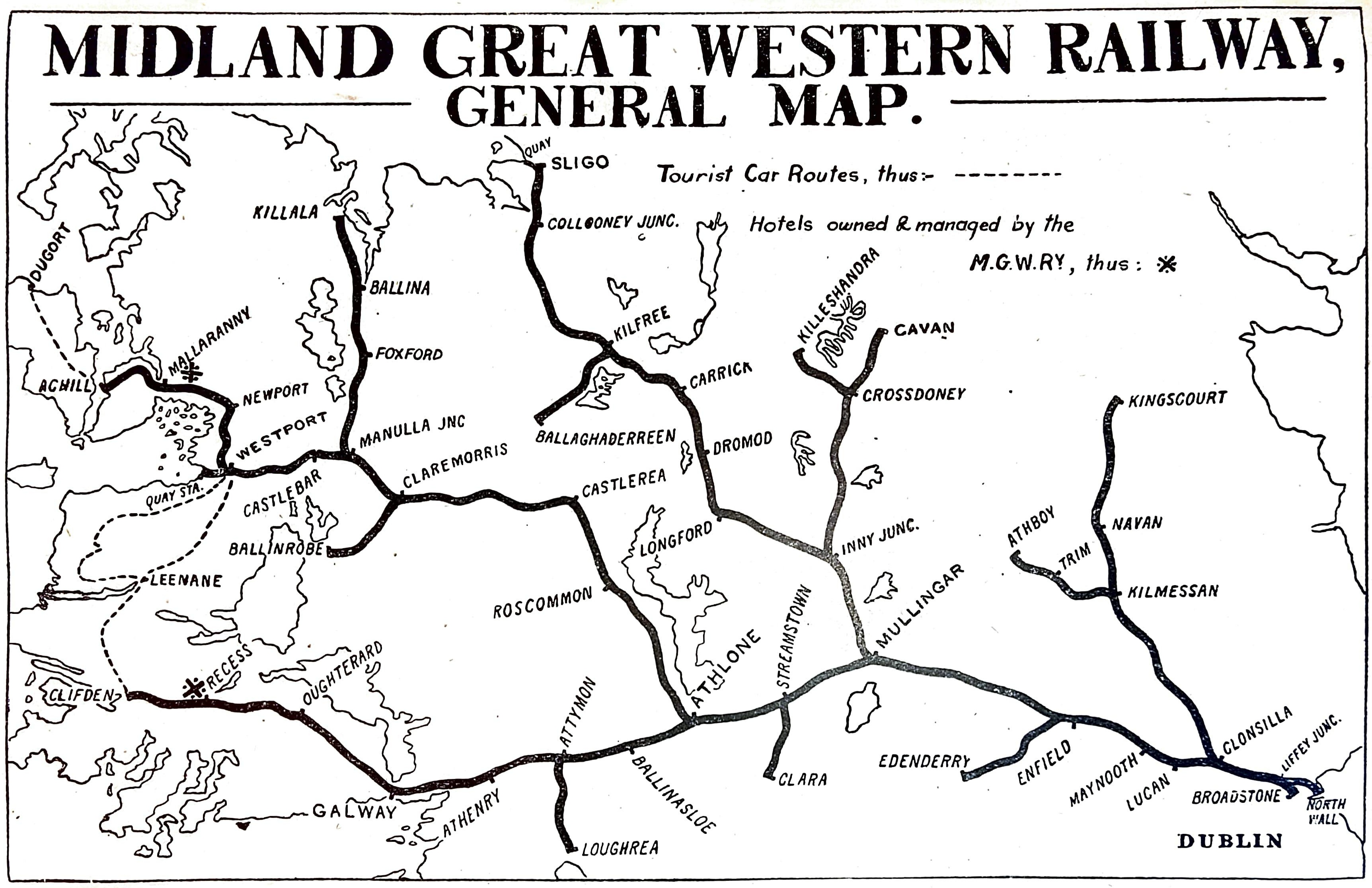
1920 map of the MGWR network

== Consolidation ==
In 1924 the Oireachtas of the Irish Free State passed the Railways Act 1924, which that November merged the MGWR with the Great Southern and Western Railway (GS&WR), Cork, Bandon and South Coast Railway to form the Great Southern Railway. In January 1925, that was joined by the Dublin and South Eastern Railway to form the Great Southern Railways (GSR).

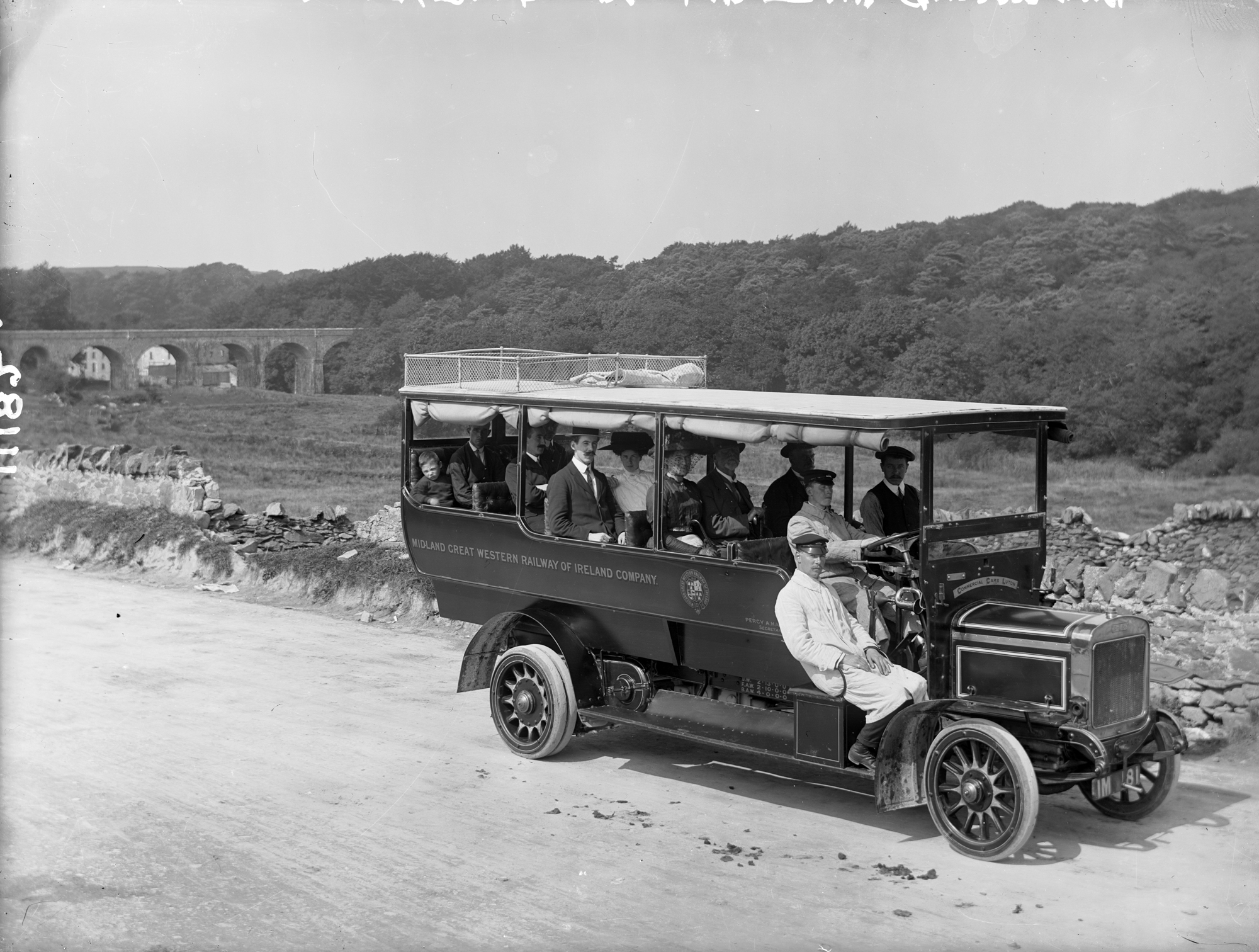
MGWR bus (1907)

== Locomotives and rolling stock ==
Locomotives and rolling stock were maintained at MGWR's Broadstone works in Dublin.

=== Livery ===
The MGWR painted all of its locomotives bright emerald until about 1902, when the first of the new Class A 4-4-0 express locomotives were outshopped in royal blue. This did not wear well and in 1905 the company adopted grass green. From about 1913 locos were painted gloss black until the MGWR became part of the GSR in 1925. From then on, all locomotives were gradually repainted plain unlined dark grey.

Passenger coaches were finished in varnish or brown paint until the blue livery was introduced in 1901. As on the locomotives this weathered badly and from 1905 the MGWR reverted to brown, which after 1910 was not so well-adorned with lining. From October 1918 coaches were painted a very dark Crimson and after 1924 the GSR used a similar shade for some years.

=== Preservation ===
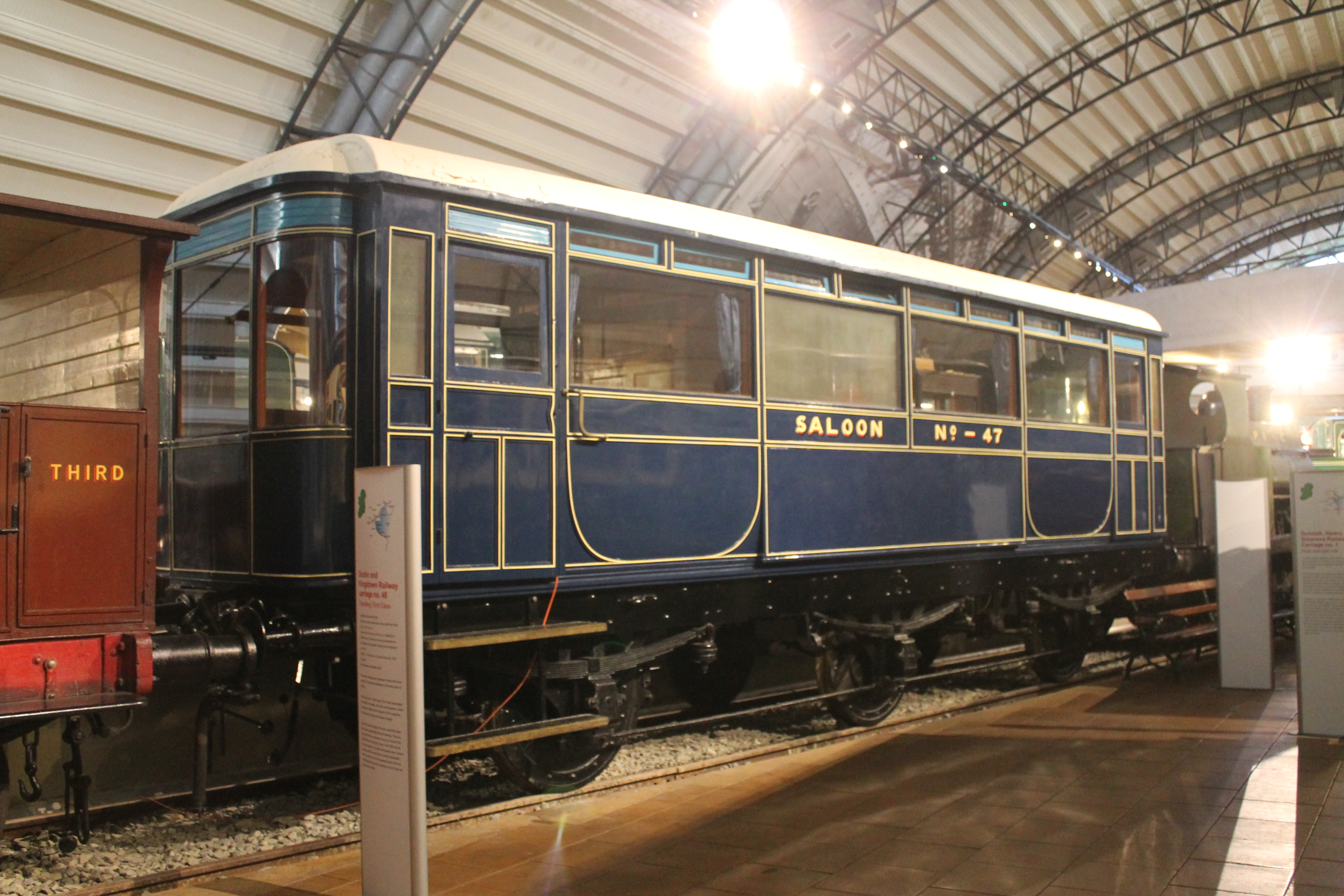
MGWR Dargan Saloon at Cultra

No MGWR locomotive has been preserved but 6 carriages and a tanker exist.

- No. 13M - Downpatrick and County Down Railway. Originally a full 2nd, this coach is an underframe only for a GNRI Coach.
- No. 25 - Downpatrick and County Down Railway. Built in 1894. Originally a full 2nd, this coach is on display in the carriage gallery awaiting restoration.
- No. 47 - Ulster Folk and Transport Museums. Built in 1844 and notable for being used as William Dargan's private saloon. Fully restored.
- No. 53 - Downpatrick and County Down Railway. Built in 1892. Originally a full 2nd, this coach is on display in the carriage gallery awaiting restoration.
- No. 62M - Railway Preservation Society of Ireland. Built in 1892. A full 3rd, this carriage is meant to be under restoration for use at the DCDR.
- No. 84 - Clifden. Built in 1897. Stored outside the former Clifden railway station next to the old Water tower.
- No. 11800 - Dunsandle railway station. This tanker is the only surviving MGWR wagon.

== Present day ==
Those of the former MGWR's main lines that are still open are owned and operated by Iarnród Éireann. Routes between Dublin and Sligo, Athlone and Galway, Athlone and Westport and the Ballina branch remain open to passenger traffic. The Meath on Track campaign is campaigning to have the Navan — Clonsilla line (not to be confused with the former GNR Navan — Drogheda line) reopened earlier than the 2030 date announced under current Iarnród Éireann policy. The Edenderry, Clifden, Achill, Cavan, Killeshandra, Ballaghaderreen branch line, Ballinrobe, Killala and Loughrea branches lines are all closed.

Rail Users Ireland proposed running some Galway — Dublin services via the MGWR station in Athlone and the disused route via Moate to Mullingar, reinstating the route of the first MGWR service via the former GS&WR line. The current Galway service runs from Dublin Heuston. Despite the opening of the Dublin-Galway greenway on the route, calls have continued from local representatives to reopen the line.

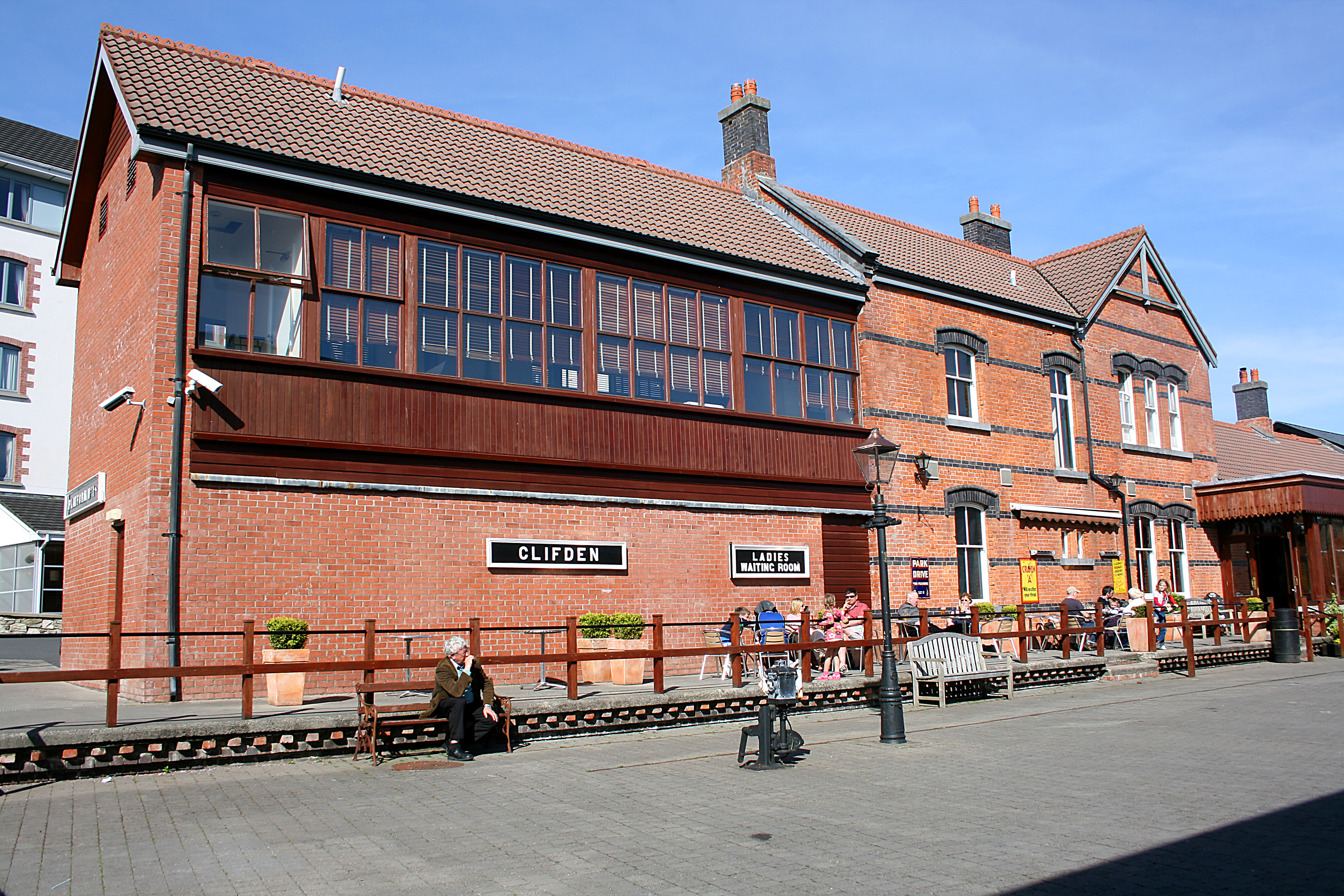
The former MGWR station at Clifden, now the Clifden Station House Hotel

Three former MGWR stations are now hotels, two of which are called the "Station House Hotel" but are unconnected by ownership. They are the expanded former Clifden station in County Galway, Kilmessan Junction in County Meath and the Mullranny Park Hotel at Mulranny, County Mayo.

The Great Western Greenway is a greenway rail trail that uses the route of the former Westport — Achill branch line.

== Senior people ==
Chairmen

- Lord Dunsandle (1845-1847)
- John Ennis (1847-1865)
- William Maunsell (1865-1865 - 2 days)
- Sir Ralph Smith Cusack (1865-1905)
- Honourable Richard Nugent, youngest son of the ninth Earl of Westmeath (1905-1912)
- Major H. C. Cusack (1912-)

Deputy Chairmen

This position was not always filled.

- John Ennis (1845-1847)
- Honourable Richard Nugent (Briefly in 1903)
- Major H. C. Cusack (1905-1912)

General Managers

- J.E. Ward (ca.1870-1890)
- Joseph Tatlow (1890-1912)
- M.F. Keogh (1912-1924)

Chief Mechanical Engineer/Locomotive Superintendent

- John Dewrance (1847-)
- Edward Wilson (1854-)
- Joseph Cabry (1856-1862)
- Rober Ramage (1862-)
- Martin Atock (1865-1900)
- Edward Cusack (1901-1915)
- W. H. Morton (1916-1924)

== Legislation ==
- Midland Great Western Railway of Ireland Act 1845
- Midland Great Western Railway of Ireland (Newcastle, Anniskinnan and Baltrasna Deviations) Act 1847
- Advance of Money (Athlone to Galway Railway) Act 1849
- Great Northern and Western (of Ireland) Railway Act 1857
- Navan and Kingscourt Railway Act 1865
- Navan and Kingscourt Railway (Deviations) Act 1867
- Great Northern and Western (of Ireland) Railway (Lease) Act 1870
- Navan and Kingscourt Railway Act 1871
- Navan and Kingscourt Railway Act 1873
- Midland Great Western Railway of Ireland Act 1877
- Navan and Kingscourt Railway Act 1878
- Midland Great Western, Dublin and Meath, and Navan and Kingscourt Railways (Purchase) Act 1888
- Midland Great Western and Great Northern and Western of Ireland Railways (Amalgamation) Act 1890

== See also ==
- History of rail transport in Ireland
- Rail transport in Ireland
- Iarnród Éireann

== Sources ==
- Baker, Michael H. C. (1972). Irish Railways since 1916. Ian Allan. ISBN 0711002827.
- Casserley, H.C. (1974). Outine of Irish Railway History. Newton Abbot: David & Charles. ISBN 0715363778.
- Shepherd, W. Ernest (1994). The Midland Great Western Railway of Ireland: An Illustrated History. Leicester: Midland Publishing. ISBN 1-85780-008-7.
- Tatlow, Joseph (1920). Fifty Years of Railway Life in England, Scotland and Ireland. London: The Railway Gazette. OCLC 1045333714. OL 210891W.
