= 2-4-0+0-4-2 =

Locomotive wheel arrangement

Equivalent classifications
- UIC class: 1B+B1, 1’B+B1’
- French class: 120+021
- Turkish class: 23+23
- Swiss class: 2/3+2/3, 4/6 from the 1920s
- Russian class: 1-2-0+0-2-1
First known tank engine version
- First use: 1915
- Country: Brazil
- Locomotive: Q class
- Railway: São Paulo Railway
- Designer: Beyer, Peacock and Company
- Builder: Beyer, Peacock and Company
- Evolved from: 0-4-0+0-4-0

Under the Whyte notation for the classification of steam locomotives by wheel arrangement, 2-4-0+0-4-2 is an articulated locomotive, usually of the Garratt type. The wheel arrangement is effectively two 2-4-0 locomotives operating back to back, with the boiler and cab suspended between the two power units. Each power unit has two leading wheels on one axle, four powered and coupled driving wheels on two axles and no trailing wheels. A similar wheel arrangement exists for Mallet locomotives, but is referred to as 2-4-4-2 since only the front engine unit can pivot.

== History ==
This was the second rarest Garratt wheel arrangement. Only five locomotives were constructed to this arrangement, four of which were built by Beyer, Peacock and Company (BP).

The four BP locomotives comprised three for the 5 ft 3 in (1,600 mm) São Paulo Railway of Brazil in 1915, and one for the 2 ft 6 in (762 mm) gauge Ceylon Government Railway (CGR) in 1929, the CGR's class H1.

One more was built in 1919 by the São Paulo Railway, for its own use on 1,000 mm (3 ft 3 3/8 in) metre gauge.

== Manufacturers ==
2-4-0+0-4-2 Garratt production list – All manufacturers
Gauge	Railway	Class	Works no.	Units	Year	Builder
2 ft 6 in	Ceylon Government Railway	H1	6629	1	1929	Beyer, Peacock
1,000 mm	São Paulo Railway, Brazil			1	1919	São Paulo Railway
5 ft 3 in	São Paulo Railway, Brazil	Q	5892-5894	3	1915	Beyer, Peacock

== Usage ==
=== Ceylon ===
The single class H1 Garratt entered service on the Ceylon Government Railways in 1931. It was used in mixed traffic working on the Uda Pussellawa railway. Until the 1960s, the locomotive was occasionally operated on the Kelani Valley Line. It was withdrawn from service in 1972 and was scrapped in 1981.
