= Ceylon Government Railway H1 =

Type and origin
- Power type: Steam
- Builder: Beyer, Peacock & Company
- Serial number: 6629
- Build date: 1930
- Total produced: 1
Specifications
- Configuration
  - Whyte: 2-4-0+0-4-2T
- Gauge: 2 ft 6 in (762 mm)
- Leading dia.: 1 ft 9 in (533 mm)
- Driver dia.: 2 ft 6 in (762 mm)
- Trailing dia.: 1 ft 9 in (533 mm)
- Wheelbase: 35 ft 9 in (10.90 m)
- Length: 41 ft 5 in (12.62 m)
- Height: 10 ft 6 in (3.20 m)
- Axle load: 7.05 long tons
- Loco weight: 39 long tons
- Fuel type: Coal
- Fuel capacity: 2 long tons
- Water cap.: 1000 gal
- Boiler pressure: 175 lbf/in^{2} (1,210 kPa)
- Cylinders: 4
- Cylinder size: 10 in × 16 in (254 mm × 406 mm)
- Valve gear: Walschaerts
- Valve type: Piston
Performance figures
- Tractive effort: 15,866 lb (7,197 kg)
Career
- Operators: Udupussallawa railway and Kelani Valley Line
- Class: H1
- Number in class: 1
- Nicknames: Baby Garratt
- Locale: Ceylon
- First run: 1930
- Withdrawn: 1972
- Scrapped: 1981
- Disposition: Scrapped

The Ceylon Government Railway H1 was a solitary 2-4-0+0-4-2T narrow-gauge (2ft 6in) Garratt steam locomotive built by Beyer, Peacock & Company, England for the Ceylon Government Railway (now Sri Lanka Railways).

== History ==
This locomotive entered service with the railway in 1931, and was designated as the UPR-GARRATT Class before the reclassification of 1937. It was originally used for passenger and freight services on the narrow-gauge (2ft 6in) Uda Pussellawa Railway (UPR) between Nanu Oya and Ragala via Nuwara Eliya. No. 293 met with a serious accident near Nuwara Eliya in 1942 while hauling a freight train at excessive speed. It was returned to service in 1944 following repairs. Until the 1960s, the locomotive was occasionally used on the narrow-gauge Kelani Valley Line.

Following withdrawal from service in 1972, it was scrapped in 1981.

== See also ==
- Locomotives of Sri Lanka Railways
- Ceylon Government Railway C1
