= Uda Pussellawa Railway =

Railway line in Sri lanka

Overview
- Native name: උඩුපුස්සැල්ලාව දුම්රිය මාර්ගය
- Status: Closed
- Owner: Ceylon Government Railway
- Locale: Sri Lanka
- Termini: Nanu Oya railway station; Ragala
- Stations: 5

Service
- System: Ceylon Government Railway
- Operator(s): Ceylon Government Railway
- Daily ridership: 7279 as in 1934

History
- Opened: 1904
- Closed: 1 March 1948

Technical
- Line length: 31 km (19 mi)
- Track gauge: 2 ft 6 in (762 mm)
- Highest elevation: 1,925.6 m (6,318 ft)

Uda Pussellawa Railway (UPR) or Udupussallawa Railway (Sinhala: උඩුපුස්සැල්ලාව දුම්රිය මාර්ගය Uḍupussællāwa Dumriya Mārgaya) was a 2 ft 6 in (762 mm) narrow gauge railway line that existed in Ceylon (now Sri Lanka) between 1903 and 1948. The line connected Nanu Oya railway station with Ragala via Nuwara Eliya.

== History ==
The closest station to Nuwara Eliya on the existing heavy gauge railway line (Main Line) was Nanu Oya railway station. The distance from Nuwara Eliya to Nanu Oya was approximately 6.4 km (4.0 mi) and colonial planters in Nuwara Eliya faced many difficulties when transporting goods from Nanu Oya to Nuwara Eliya. They asked for a railway track from Nanu Oya to Nuwara Eliya from the British governor Sir West Ridgeway, who was on a trip to Nuwara Eliya on 25 April 1895. Considering their appeal initial work on the track was commenced in November 1900. The first stage up to Nuwara Eliya was completed and opened on 14 December 1903 by Sir Henry Blake, Nuwara Eliya to Kandapola on 21 December 1903 and the final stage from Kandapola to Ragala was completed in July 1904. The cost of construction was about £5,500 per mile and is equivalent in purchasing power to about £412,098.49 or Rs 88,358,036.72 per kilometer in 2019.

== Infrastructure ==
The line was constructed in 2 ft 6 in (762 mm) gauge. The total length from Nanu Oya to Ragala was 31 km (19 mi), and five main railway stations were built on the line: Blackpool, Nuwara Eliya, Kandapola, Brookside and Ragala. The highest elevation on the line was at Kandapola railway station. Its elevation was 1,925 m (6,316 ft) above sea level.

== Rolling stock ==
The first steam engine to run on this line was imported in 1902 from the Fast Stewart company in England. The famous CGR class H1 steam engine has also performed on this line for a few years.

== Operations ==
In 1920 five goods trains and eleven mixed trains were operating on this line. There was a special luxury compartment for governor's journeys.

== Decline and closure ==
In the 1940s transportation by lorries was getting popular and demand for the railway transport was gradually decreasing. Road transport in this area became faster than railway transport. So the services on the line was incurring losses day by day.

In January 1940, all passenger services were withdrawn and only two freight trains were in operation between Nanu Oya and Ragala.

Considering the operational difficulties, the government decided to abandon this line. In 1942, the first stage from Nanu Oya to Nuwara Eliya was removed, and later in 1948 the remaining part up to Ragala was removed. On 2 August 1948 all services were withdrawn and the line was completely removed.

== Former stations ==
The Udupussallawa line had five stations: Blackpool; Nuwara Eliya; Kandeppola; Brookside and terminating at the Ragala railway station.

Although the railway line was removed the former railway station buildings were not removed and parcel transfer services were conducted from these stations for many years following the closure. Some ruins of these stations can be seen even today. Some are used as government offices.

== See also ==
- Sri Lanka Railways
- CGR class H1
