= Nanu Oya railway station =

Railway station in Nanu Oya, Sri Lanka

Nanu Oya
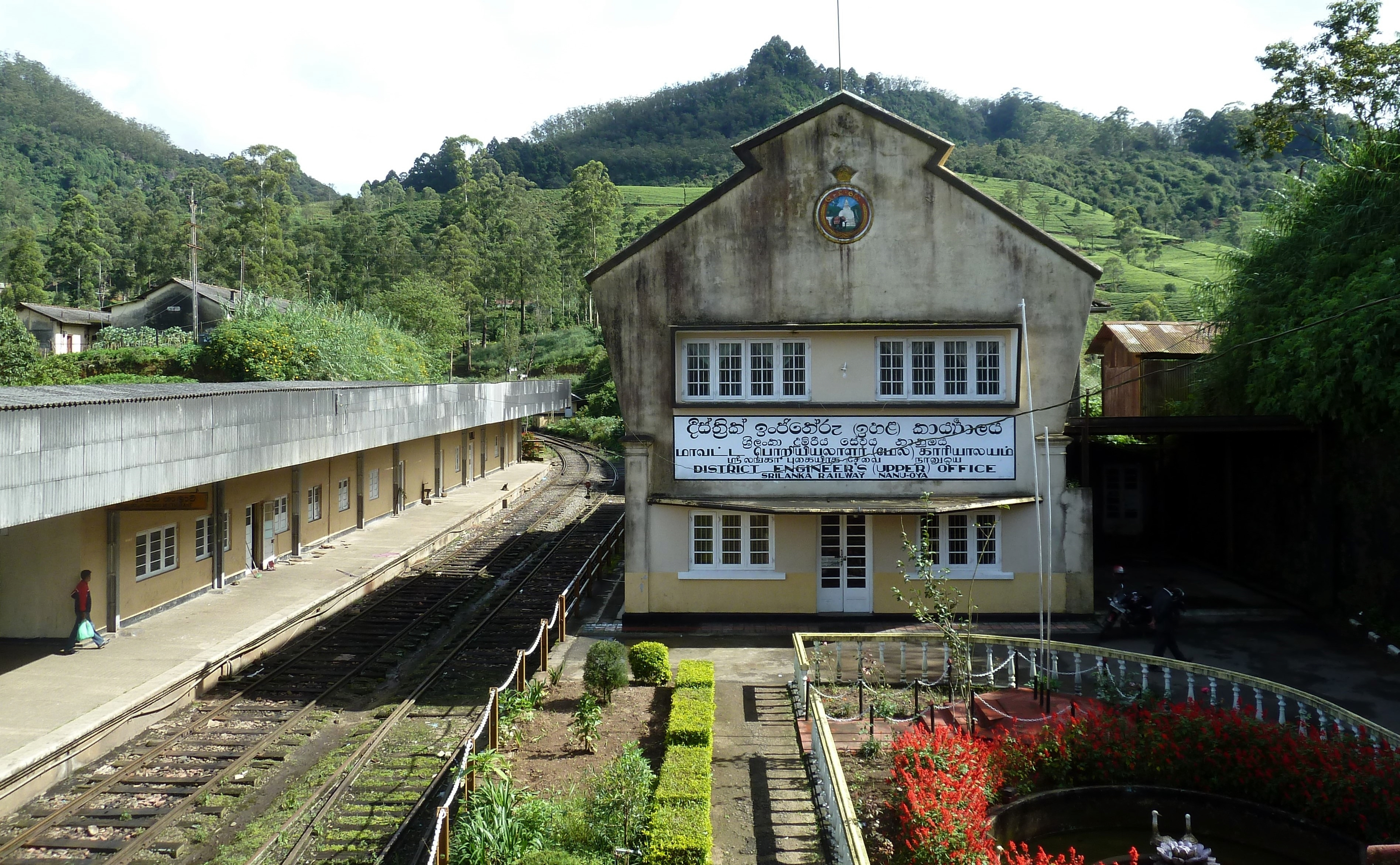

General information
- Location: Nanu Oya; Sri Lanka
- Coordinates: 6.9424°N 80.7437°E
- Operated by: Sri Lanka Railways
- Line(s): Main line
- Distance: 206.9 km (128.6 mi) from Colombo
- Platforms: 2 side platforms

Other information
- Station code: NOA

History
- Opened: 20 May 1885

The Nanu Oya railway station is the 63rd station on the Main Line, and is 206.9 km (128.6 mi) away from Colombo. All trains including Podi Menike and Udarata Menike express trains service the station. The station was a junction and branching point for the Udupussallawa narrow gauge railway line connecting Nanu Oya with Ragala via Nuwara Eliya.

The original train station was built in 1885 as the terminus of the main line, as part of the 31 km (19 mi) rail line connecting Hatton to Nanu Oya. In 1893 the railway line was extended from Nanu Oya to Bandarawela and in 1903 the station became a junction station when Udupussallawa railway line was constructed. In 1948 the government decided to close the Udapussellawa railway due to low traffic and the tracks were completely removed.

== Continuity ==
Preceding station	Sri Lanka Railways	Following station
Great Western	Main Line	Ambewela

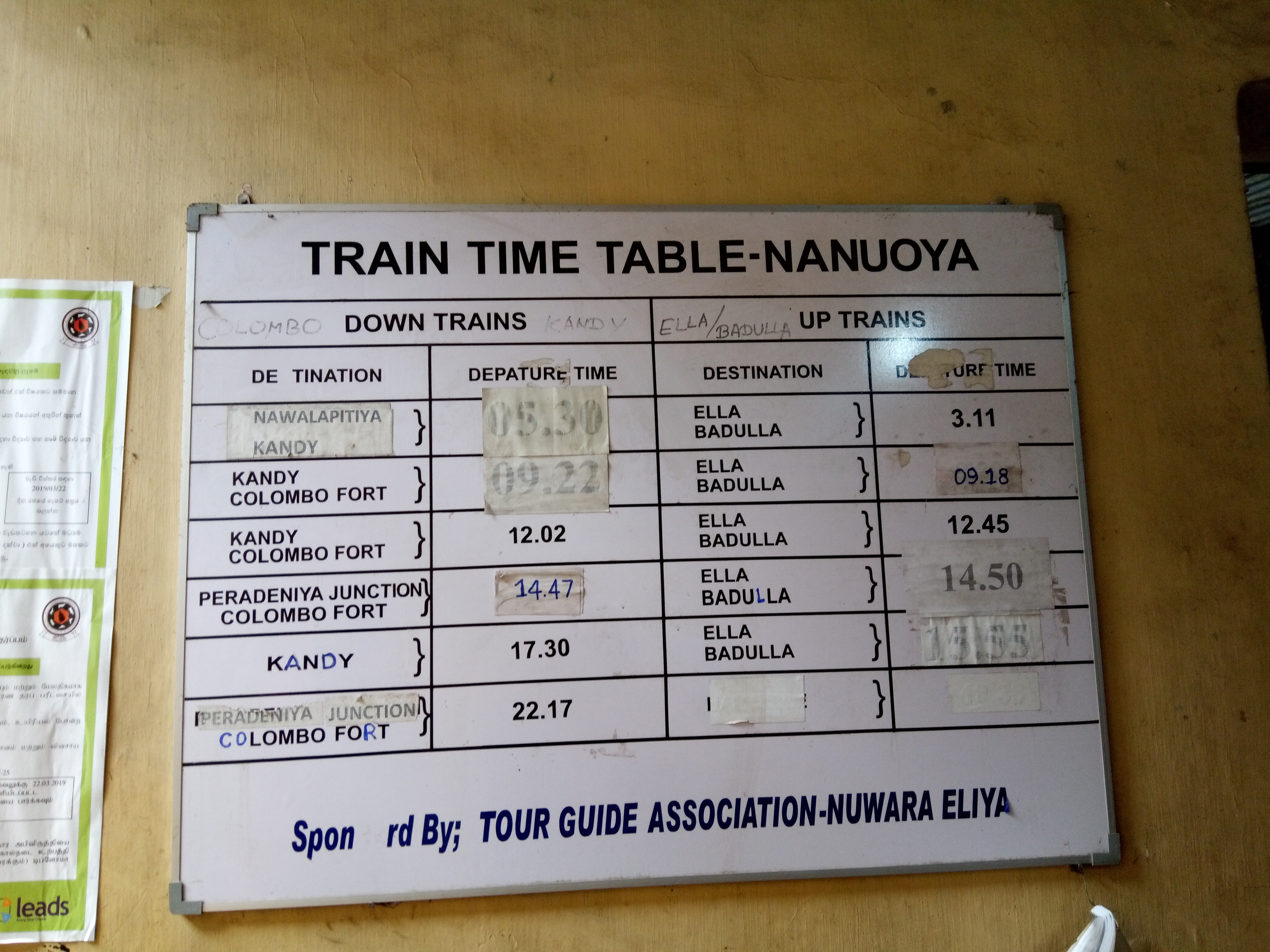
Time Table at Nanu Oya Railway Station

== See also ==
- List of railway stations in Sri Lanka
- List of railway stations in Sri Lanka by line
- Sri Lanka Railways
- Nuwaraeliya
