= South Australian Railways G class =

Class of Australian 2-4-0T locomotives

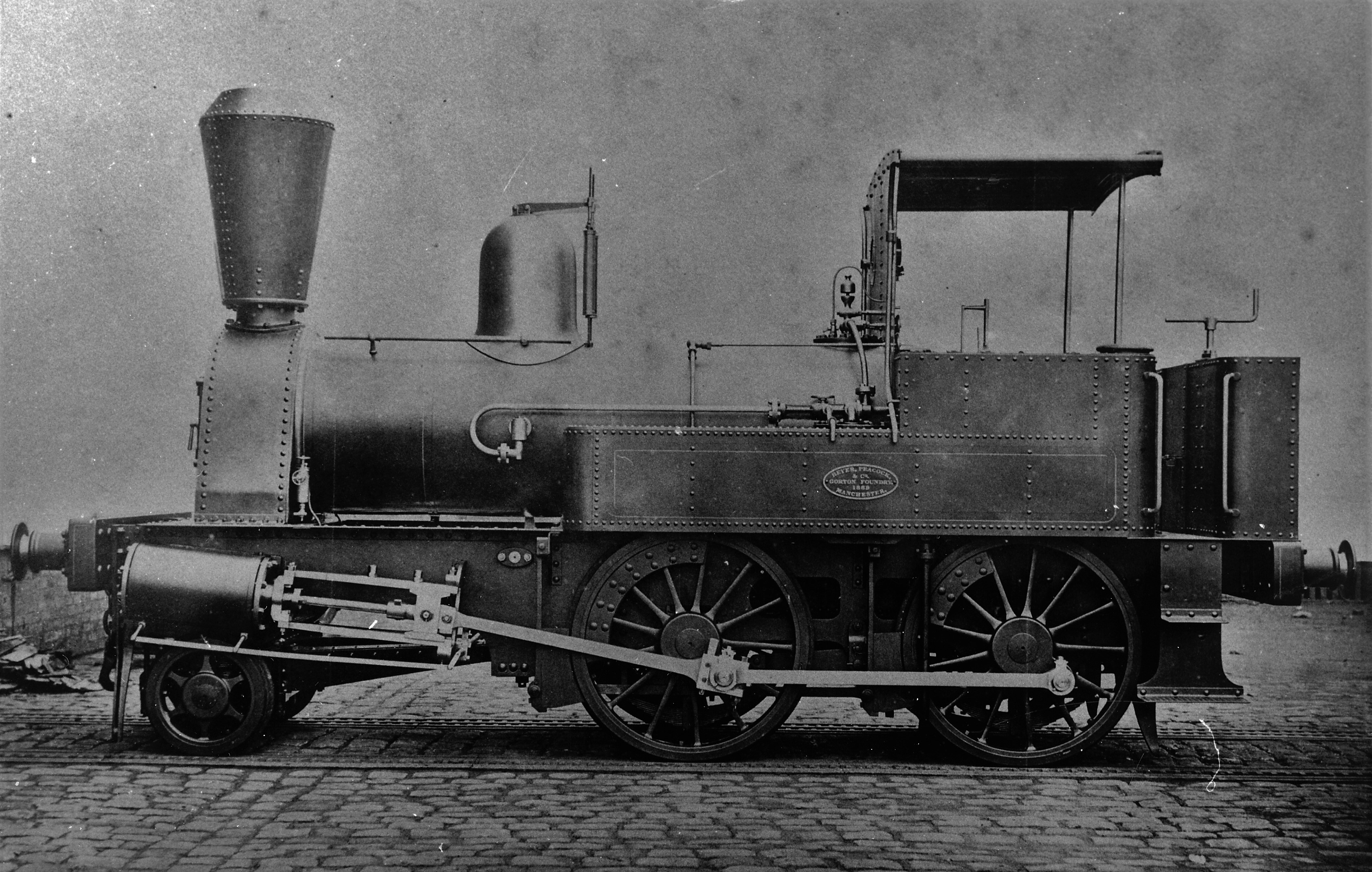
- South Australian Railways G class locomotive
Type and origin
- Power type: Steam
- Builder: Beyer, Peacock and Company
- Serial number: 858-859 2739-2741 1900-1902
- Build date: 1869-1886
- Total produced: 8
- Rebuilder: Islington Railway Workshops
- Rebuild date: 1884 (No. 23) 1886 (No. 24) 1905 (No. 99) 1914 (No. 100) 1901 (No. 101)
- Number rebuilt: 5
Specifications
- Configuration
  - Whyte: 2-4-0T
  - UIC: 1'B T
- Gauge: 5 ft 3 in (1,600 mm)
- Driver dia.: 4 ft 0 in (1,219 mm)
- Length: 23 ft 2 1/4 in (7.07 m)
- Height: 11 ft 6.00 in (3,505.2 mm)
- Axle load: 81 long tons 10 cwt (182,600 lb or 82.8 t)
- Loco weight: 21 long tons 0 cwt (47,000 lb or 21.3 t)
- Fuel type: Coal
- Fuel capacity: 0 long tons 10.5 cwt (1,200 lb or 0.5 t)
- Water cap.: 325 imp gal (390 US gal; 1,480 L)
- Firebox
  - Grate area: 7.43 sq ft (0.690 m^{2})
- Boiler pressure: 130 psi (896 kPa)
- Heating surface
  - Firebox: 37 sq ft (3.4 m^{2})
  - Tubes: 368.9 sq ft (34.27 m^{2})
- Cylinders: 2
- Cylinder size: 11 in × 18 in (279 mm × 457 mm)
Performance figures
- Tractive effort: 5,013 lbf (22.30 kN)
Career
- Operators: South Australian Railways
- Class: G
- Number in class: 8
- Numbers: 23-24, 99-101, 156 & 161-162
- First run: 1869
- Withdrawn: 1904-1923
- Disposition: All scrapped

The South Australian Railways G class locomotives first appeared on the South Australian Railways in 1869 after being purchased from Beyer, Peacock and Company. More locomotives were purchased and in service by 1880, and again in 1886. The G class was extinct by 1923.

== History ==
Only five of the G class locomotives were purchased new by the South Australian Railways from Beyer, Peacock and Company. The rest of the class were acquired upon the takeover of the Glenelg and Grange railway lines from private operators. On 2 August 1873, the Adelaide, Glenelg and Suburban Railway Company opened a line between Adelaide and Glenelg via King William Street and South Terrace, Adelaide. This is the route currently used by trams on the Glenelg tram line. On 25 May 1880, the Holdfast Bay railway line was officially opened and a line from the Adelaide railway station, North Terrace to Glenelg through Richmond and Plympton. These two lines were eventually amalgamated in 1881 and formed the Glenelg Railway Company. The Glenelg Railway Company in turn passed over the Government control on 15 December 1899. The Grange Railway Company built and operated a line between Woodville and Grange in 1882, which was then acquired by the South Australian Railways on 1 January 1893.

G class locomotives No. 23 and No. 24 were the first of two locomotives of the class imported to work over the newly opened Roseworthy-Tarlee section of the Northern Railway in 1869. No. 23 was the first of many locomotives purchased from Beyer Peacock by the SAR. No. 23 and No. 24 were later employed to work on the Strathalbyn to Victor Harbor railway line. The remaining three G class locomotives (No. 99, 100 and 101) replaced the Belgian Steam Railcar on the Strathalbyn to Milang and to Victor Harbor railway line.
