= Ceylon Government Railway C1 =

Ceylon Government Railway C1/C1A
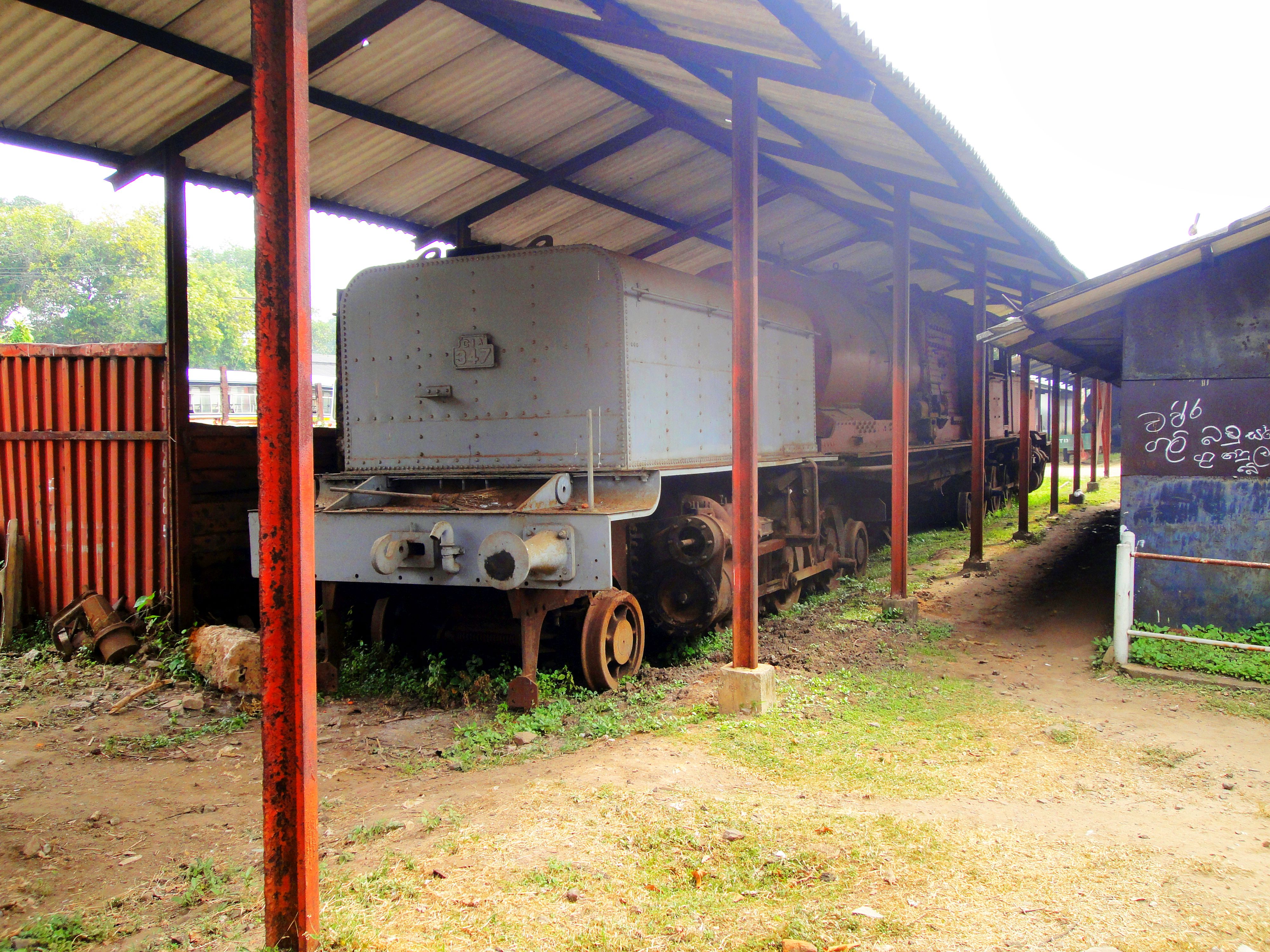
Type and origin
- Power type: Steam
- Builder: Beyer, Peacock & Company
- Serial number: 6410 (C1); 7160-7167 (C1A)
- Build date: 1928 (C1); 1946 (C1A)
- Total produced: 1 (C1); 8 (C1A)
Specifications
- Configuration
  - Whyte: 2-6-2+2-6-2
- Gauge: 5 ft 6 in (1,676 mm)
- Driver dia.: 43 in (1.092 m)
- Length: 74 ft 2 in (22.61 m)
- Loco weight: 122 long tons (124 t) (C1); 128 long tons (130 t) (C1A)
- Fuel type: Coal (C1); Oil (C1A)
- Fuel capacity: 7 long tons (7.1 t) (C1); 6 long tons (6.1 t) (C1A)
- Water cap.: 4,000 imp gal (18,000 L) (C1); 3,510 imp gal (16,000 L) (C1A)
- Boiler pressure: 185 psi
- Cylinders: 4
- Cylinder size: 16 in × 22 in (406 mm × 559 mm)
- Valve gear: Walschaerts, piston valves
Performance figures
- Tractive effort: 40,078 lbf (178.28 kN) (C1); 41,200 lbf (183.27 kN) (C1A)
Career
- Operators: Ceylon Government Railway
- Preserved: 346, 347
- Disposition: Two preserved, remainder scrapped

The Ceylon Government Railway C1 and C1A were a class of steam locomotives of the Garratt type built by Beyer, Peacock & Company, England for the Ceylon Government Railway (now Sri Lanka Railways).

== History ==
The C1 prototype was built in 1928. It was originally designated as the GARRATT Class before the reclassification of 1937.

The C1 was followed by eight C1A locomotives in 1946. The C1A sub-class was converted to oil firing between 1950 and 1954.

The original C1 Garratt did not survive into preservation, but two C1As, Numbers 346 and 347, did. As of now, No. 347 is located at Dematagoda while No. 346 has been moved to the new National Railway Museum in Colombo as a part of the national collection.

== Locomotives ==
Sub-class	Numbers	Quantity	Disposition
C1	241	1	Scrapped
C1A	343	8	Scrapped
C1A	344	8	Scrapped
C1A	345	8	Scrapped
C1A	346	8	Preserved
C1A	347	8	Preserved
C1A	348	8	Scrapped
C1A	349	8	Scrapped
C1A	350	8	Scrapped

== See also ==
- Locomotives of Sri Lanka Railways
- Ceylon Government Railway H1
