= South Australian Railways L class =

South Australian Railways 4-4-0 broad gauge locomotives

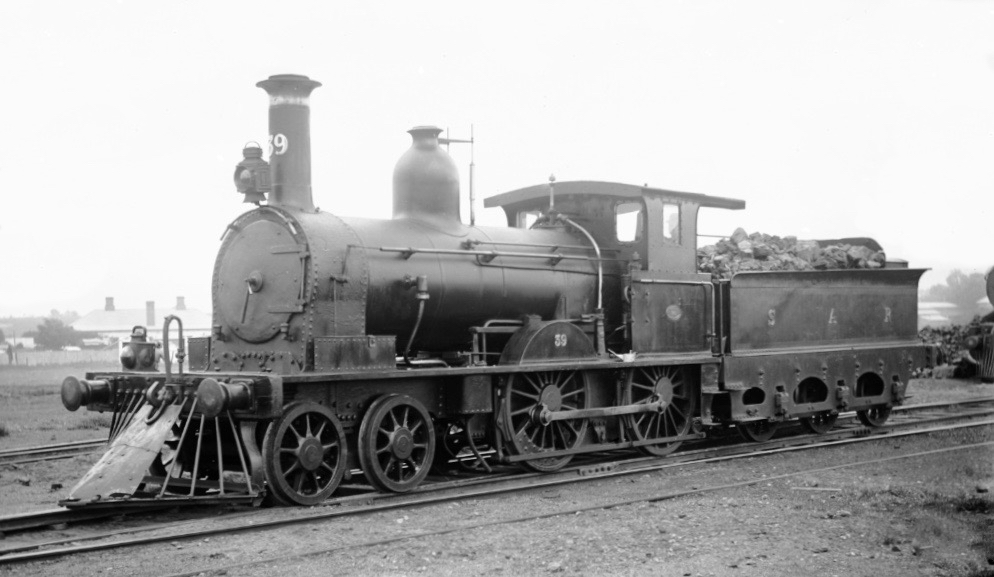
- L class locomotive no. 39 about 1910. Conversion to this tender configuration occurred within months of the locomotives' introduction in 1880.
Type and origin
- Power type: Steam
- Builder: Beyer, Peacock and Company (locomotives); Dübs and Company (tenders)
- Serial number: Nos. 1883 to 1886
- Build date: 1879
- Total produced: 4
- Rebuilder: Islington Railway Workshops
- Rebuild date: 1880-1881 (converted to tender locomotives); 1894-1914 (rebuilt)
- Number rebuilt: 4
Specifications
- Configuration
  - Whyte: 4-4-0
  - UIC: 2'B T
- Gauge: 5 ft 3 in (1,600 mm)
- Leading dia.: 3 feet 0 inches (910 mm)
- Driver dia.: 5 feet 0 inches (1,520 mm)
- Tender wheels: 3 feet 9 inches (1,140 mm)
- Length
  - Over beams: Tank version: 29 feet 6 inches (8.99 m); Tender version:45 feet 2 inches (13.77 m)
- Width: 8 feet 6 inches (2,590.80 mm)
- Height: 13 feet 0 inches (3,962.40 mm)
- Frame type: Plate
- Adhesive weight: Tank version: 12 long tons 16 cwt 3 qr (28,760 lb or 13.04 t); Tender version: 10 long tons 16 cwt (24,200 lb or 11 t)
- Loco weight: Tank version: 36 long tons 3 cwt 1 qr (81,000 lb or 36.74 t)
- Total weight: Tender version: 57 long tons 14 cwt (129,200 lb or 58.6 t)
- Tender type: 6-wheel
- Fuel type: Coal
- Fuel capacity: Tank version: approx. 1 long ton 0 cwt (2,200 lb or 1 t); Tender version: 4 long tons 18 cwt 3 qr (11,060 lb or 5.02 t)
- Water cap.: Tank version: 600 imperial gallons (720 US gallons; 2,700 litres); Tender version: 2040 imperial gallons (2450 US gallons; 9300 litres)
- Firebox
  - Type: Round-top
  - Grate area: Tank version: 15.5 square feet (1.44 m^{2}); Tender version: 15.6 square feet (1.45 m^{2})
- Boiler pressure: 130 pounds per square inch (900 kPa)
- Safety valve: Ramsbottom
- Heating surface
  - Firebox: Tank version: 80.8 square feet (7.51 m^{2}); Tender version: 78.1 square feet (7.26 m^{2})
  - Tubes: Tank version: 888.1 square feet (82.51 m^{2}); Tender version: 894.1 square feet (83.06 m^{2})
- Cylinders: 2
- Cylinder size: 16 by 22 inches (406 by 559 millimetres)
- Valve gear: Stephenson's link
- Valve type: Slide
Performance figures
- Tractive effort: 10,371 pounds-force (46.13 kN)
Career
- Operators: South Australian Railways
- Class: L
- Number in class: 4
- Numbers: 38-41
- First run: 1 April 1880
- Withdrawn: 1928-1931
- Scrapped: 1928 (No. 42); 1931 (others)
- Disposition: All scrapped

Four South Australian Railways L class broad-gauge locomotives with a 4-4-0 wheel arrangement were built by Beyer, Peacock and Company in 1879 and entered service in March–April 1880. They were condemned in 1928 and 1931, and were subsequently scrapped.

== Need ==
In the early days of the South Australian Railways (SAR), in a climate of scarce funds and political interference, the need for new motive power often had to become urgent before new locomotives were ordered. In the late 1870s, several locomotives in poor condition were due to be condemned. Many of the remaining locomotives were too light for the rapidly increasing traffic on the line between the state capital, Adelaide, and its waterfront at Port Adelaide.

== Design ==
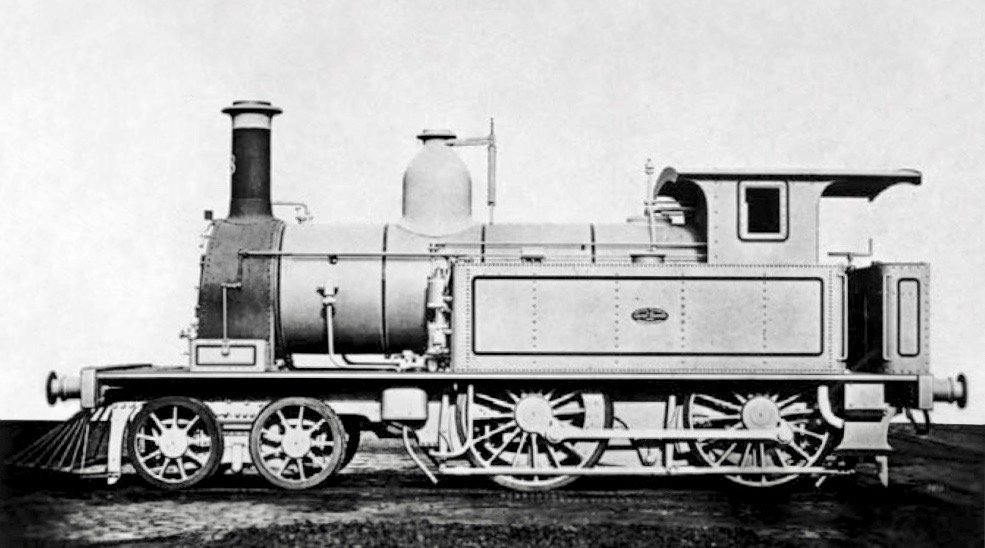
Beyer, Peacock & Co. builder's photo of L class side-tank locomotive No. 38. After all four members of the class were delivered in this configuration, it was realised the axle load on the driving wheels was excessive for the intended route.

William Thow, who had been appointed Locomotive Engineer of the SAR in 1876, prepared specifications for a new class of side-tank locomotives to work on the Port Line. Beyer, Peacock and Company, of Manchester, was awarded the contract to build four of them. They were constructed in 1879 and arrived in South Australia on 23 February 1880 on board the 1,447-ton clipper Rodney. Immediately after the first two locomotives entered service, on 19 March 1880, it became apparent that the weight on the four driving wheels was too much for the lightly constructed track and bridges, and it was inevitable that the locomotives would have to be reconfigured with tenders, allowing the side tanks (with their water load) and coal bunker to be removed from the locomotive.

== Urgent rebuild ==
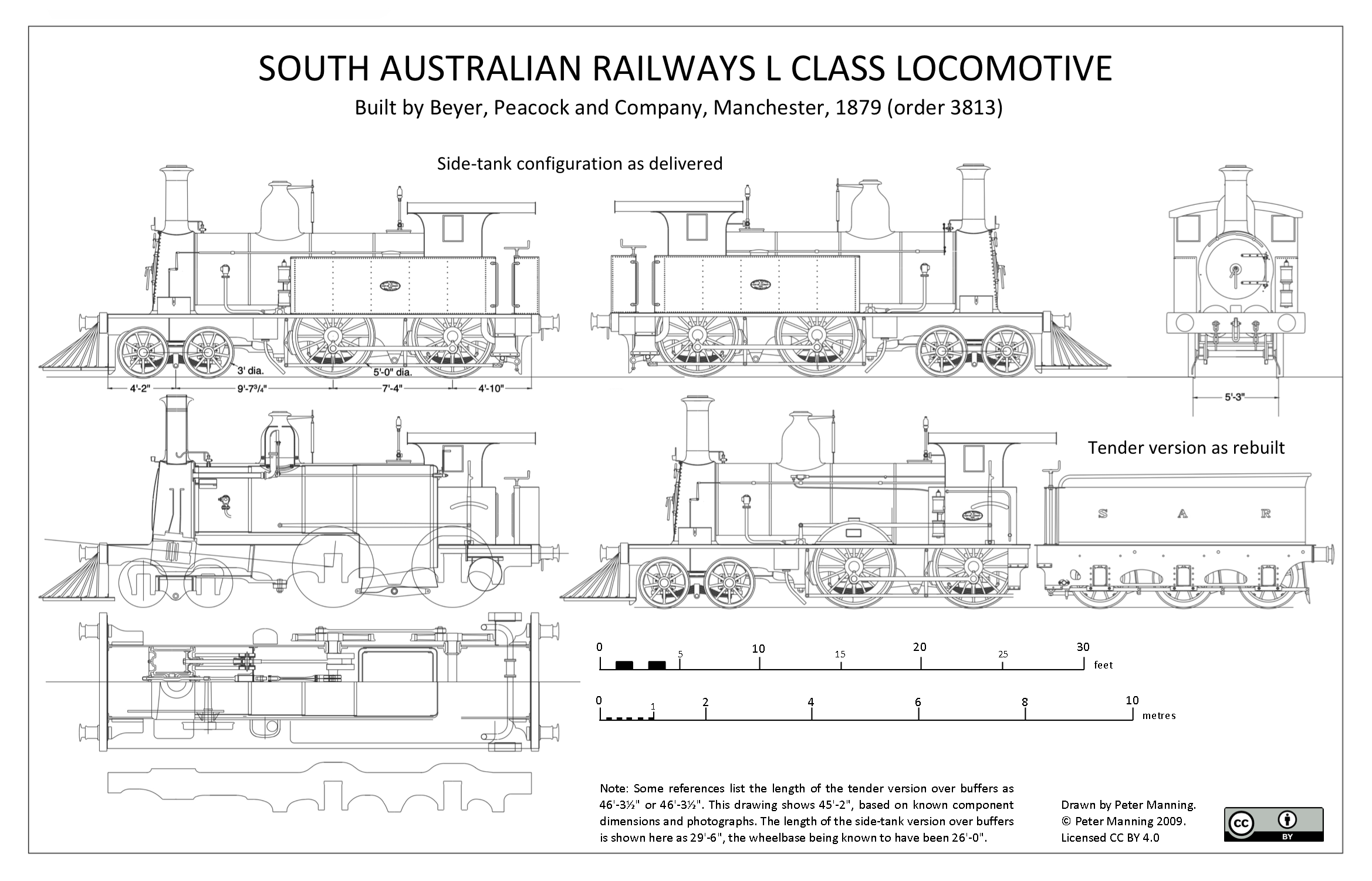
Drawings of the L class in side-tank and tender configurations

After some disagreement with Beyer, Peacock and Company, Thow placed an order for six-wheeled tenders with their rivals, Dübs and Company of Glasgow, where in his early career he had been a draftsman. Before the tenders arrived, others were commandeered from condemned locomotives. Conversion to the final configuration took place between November 1880 and February 1881; the axle load on the four driving wheels was reduced by 2 tons or 16 per cent.

The L class colour scheme was blue-black with glittering brass and copper fitments. Before 1920, the locomotives were kept in immaculate condition, but afterwards they were recorded as being dirty, neglected and unkempt.

== Deployment ==
Ironically, the L class tender locomotives did not return to the Port Line but were deployed to the North Line as far as Riverton; and when heavier rail was laid further north, to the start of the narrow gauge at Terowie. They also saw service between Roseworthy and Kapunda. Then in 1883, when the line through the Adelaide Hills to Nairne was opened as part of the Adelaide to Nairne section of the Intercolonial Railway, (Note: "The Intercolonial Railway" was the name given to the line from Adelaide to Melbourne via Serviceton, on the border, when the line was completed between those state capitals in 1883. After the states federated in 1901, the Intercolonial Express became known as the Melbourne Express until 1935, when it was named The Overland.) they operated on that line. By 1914 they were working more on secondary duties, including as pilot locomotives on the hilly Main South Line, and hauling mixed trains on the line to Pinnaroo and other lines east of Murray Bridge. Late in their service lives, they worked on the Dry Creek–Port Adelaide line, transferring freight trains between Port Adelaide and the Dry Creek railway yards.

All four L class locomotives were rebuilt between 1894 and 1901, and three were condemned in 1931 (no. 41 had received an additional rebuild in 1914 and was condemned in 1928). They were scrapped by 1934.
