= DSER 15 and 16 =

Class of two Irish 2-6-0 locomotives

Dublin & South Eastern Railway 15 and 16 GSR 461 Class CIÉ K2 Class
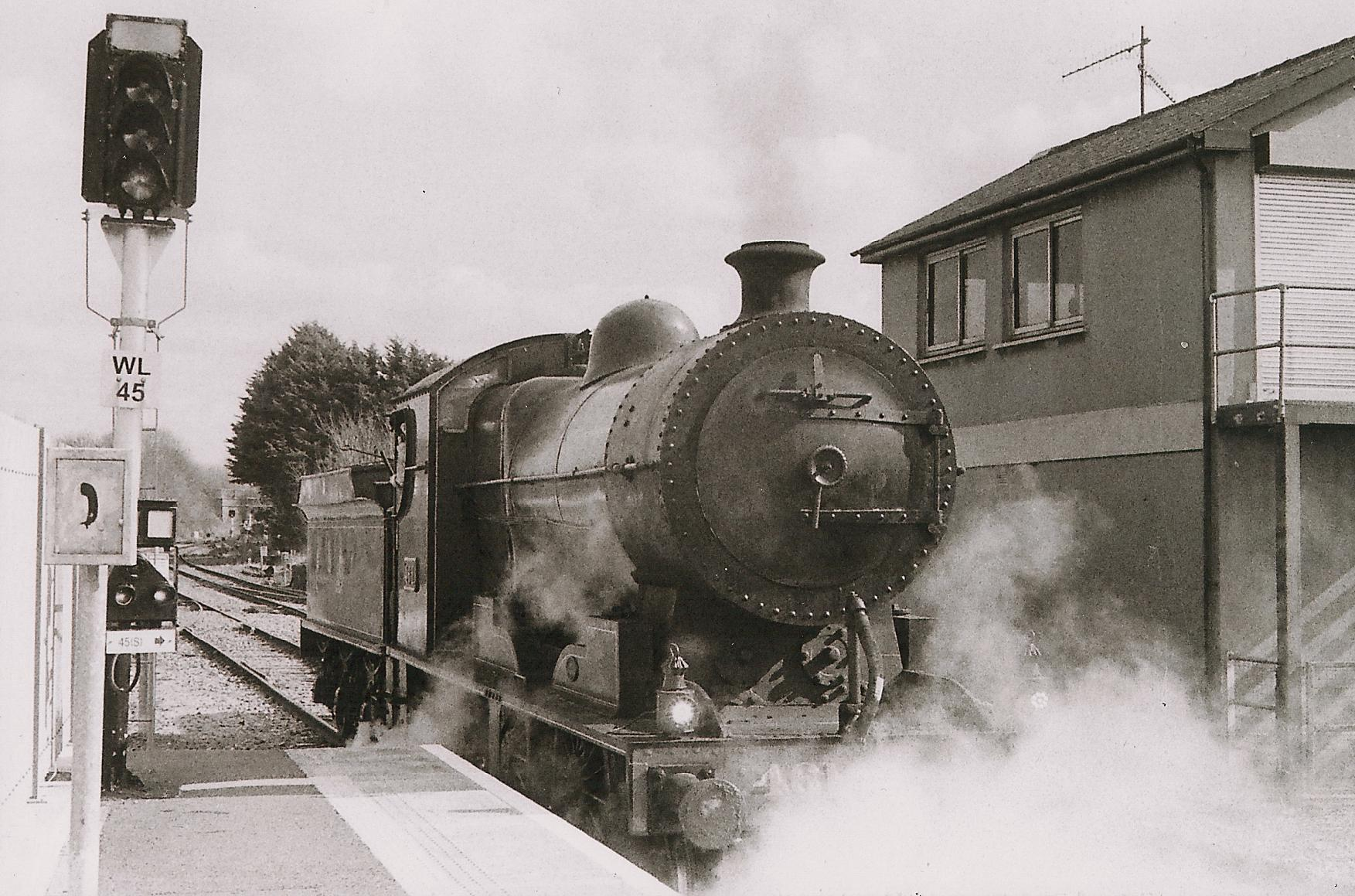
- GSR 461 at MacDonagh station, Kilkenny, in March 2015.
Type and origin
- Power type: Steam
- Designer: G. H. Wild
- Builder: Beyer, Peacock & Co.
- Order number: 02160
- Serial number: 6112–6113
- Build date: 1922
- Total produced: 2
Specifications
- Configuration
  - Whyte: 2-6-0
  - UIC: 1'C h2
- Gauge: 5 ft 3 in (1,600 mm)
- Leading dia.: 3 ft 0 in (0.914 m)
- Driver dia.: 5 ft 1 in (1.549 m)
- Axle load: 15 long tons 1 cwt (33,700 lb or 15.3 t)
- Adhesive weight: 43 long tons 9 cwt (97,300 lb or 44.1 t)
- Loco weight: 50 long tons 1 cwt (112,100 lb or 50.9 t)
- Tender weight: 32 long tons 10 cwt (72,800 lb or 33 t)
- Fuel type: Coal
- Fuel capacity: 5 long tons 0 cwt (11,200 lb or 5.1 t)
- Water cap.: 2,600 imperial gallons (12,000 L; 3,100 US gal)
- Firebox
  - Grate area: 20 sq ft (1.9 m^{2})
- Boiler pressure: 175 lbf/in^{2} (1.21 MPa)
- Heating surface
  - Firebox: 134 sq ft (12.4 m^{2})
  - Tubes and flues: 952 sq ft (88.4 m^{2})
- Superheater
  - Heating area: 164 sq ft (15.2 m^{2})
- Cylinders: Two, inside
- Cylinder size: 19 in × 26 in (483 mm × 660 mm)
- Valve type: 8 in (203 mm) piston valves
Performance figures
- Tractive effort: 22,890 lbf (101.82 kN)
Career
- Operators: Dublin and South Eastern Railway; → Great Southern Railways; → Córas Iompair Éireann
- Class: DSR: None; GSR/CIÉ: 461 or K2
- Numbers: DSER: 15–16; GSR: 461–462
- Withdrawn: 1963–1965
- Preserved: One: No. 15 / 461
- Restored: 1990, 2012
- Current owner: Railway Preservation Society of Ireland
- Disposition: One preserved, one scrapped

The Dublin and South Eastern Railway 15 and 16 were a pair of 2-6-0 steam locomotives which were built for the heavy goods (freight) traffic on the Dublin to Wexford main line of the Dublin and South Eastern Railway (DSER). The two locomotives were built by Beyer, Peacock and Company at their Gorton Foundry in Manchester.

In 1925, the DSER was absorbed into the Great Southern Railways and the two locomotives were renumbered 461 and 462, and placed in Class 461 or Class K2.

== History ==
The locomotives were originally conceived as an enlarged version of the DWWR 13, but designer Wild recognised their axle load would be too heavy for the DSER network and so the boiler size was reduced and a leading axle was added to the engines during construction. As the engines were delivered during the Irish Civil War, they were stored for safekeeping in Belfast until the cessation of hostilities.

The pair proved popular with crews, their cabs providing protection from the elements on the coastal Dublin–Rosslare railway line. The variety of services the engines were placed on meant they were rarely seen together.

== Livery ==
Originally said to have been painted green, although the DSER's standard livery was lined black, on becoming part of the GSR, they were painted in the standard livery of unlined dark battleship grey which they retained until withdrawal.

Following withdrawal, 461 was repainted into a livery based on lined DSER black for display, while still owned by CIÉ. Under the RPSI, she was initially painted plain black with a 'flying snail', but more recently she has been outshopped in an unprototypical CIÉ lined green livery upon completion of her overhaul in 2011.

== Preservation ==
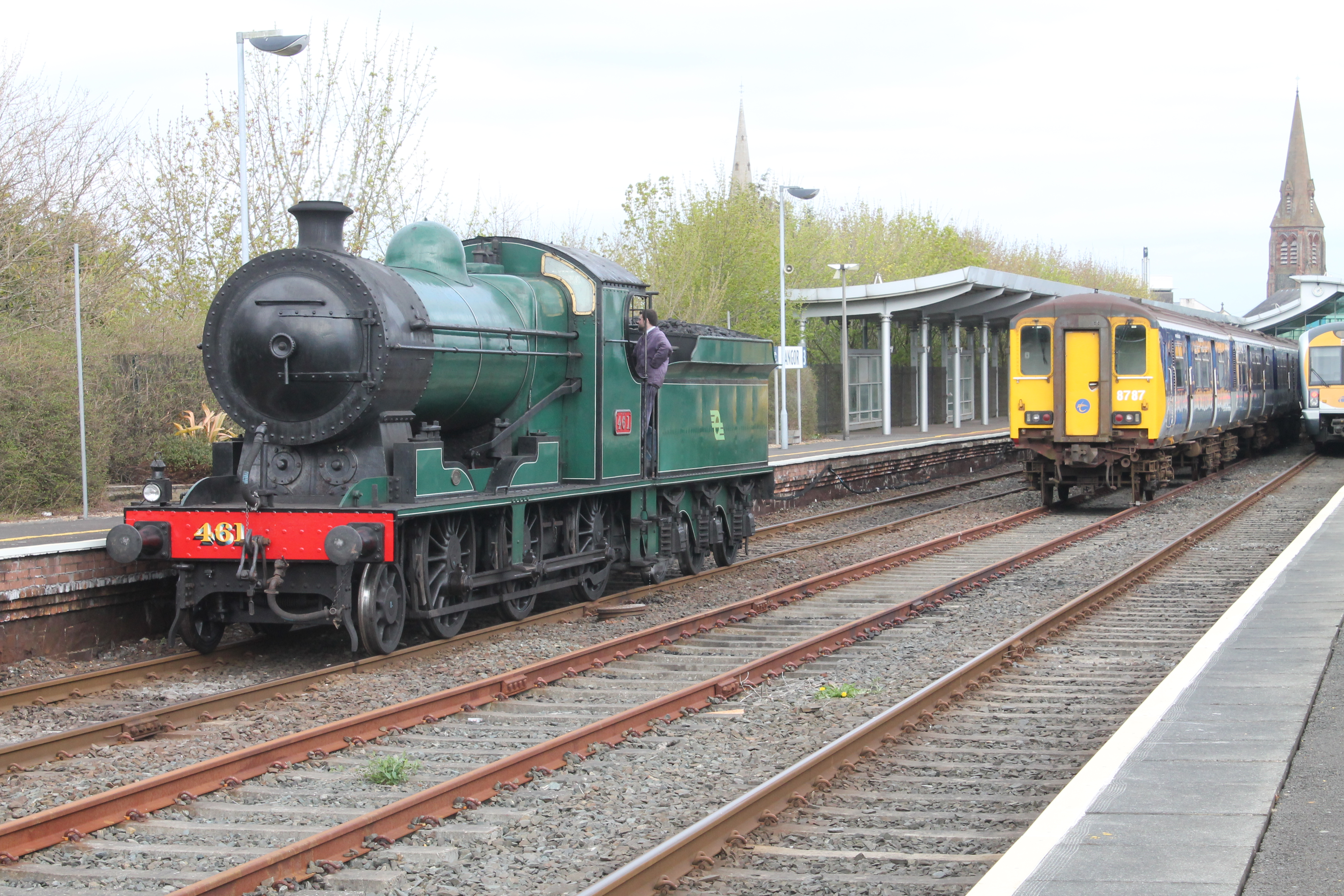
461 at Bangor in 2013

Locomotive No. 461 was initially preserved by CIÉ in 1967, one of several engines to be put on display at various railway stations around Ireland following an appeal by the Irish Railway Record Society. Other locomotives put on display by CIÉ included ex-GNR 131 and ex-GSWR No. 90.

After being moved several times following display, 461 was presented by CIÉ to the RPSI in 1977. An extensive overhaul followed at Whitehead and the locomotive returned to traffic in late 1990. The locomotive completed an overhaul in 2011 at the RPSI's Whitehead base, and was operation in the Dublin area until 2018. She has also been used on some northern operations including one to Portrush and also some to Bangor. The locomotive is currently in store in Whitehead since late 2018, awaiting overhaul.

461 has appeared in theatrical film releases such as Michael Collins, Nora, and Angela's Ashes. She can be seen in an episode of Foyle's War.

While she did have some initial steaming problems after the last overhaul, it was later discovered this was due to incorrect firebar spacing at Whitehead (which a Dublin volunteer had previously corrected in its previous service period in the 1990s). Once rectified in Dublin, her performance improved dramatically. No. 461 is the only surviving DSER locomotive.

== See also ==
- Diesel Locomotives of Ireland
- Multiple Units of Ireland
- Coaching Stock of Ireland
- Steam locomotives of Ireland
