= South Australian Railways Ge class =

Class of Australian 4-4-0T locomotives

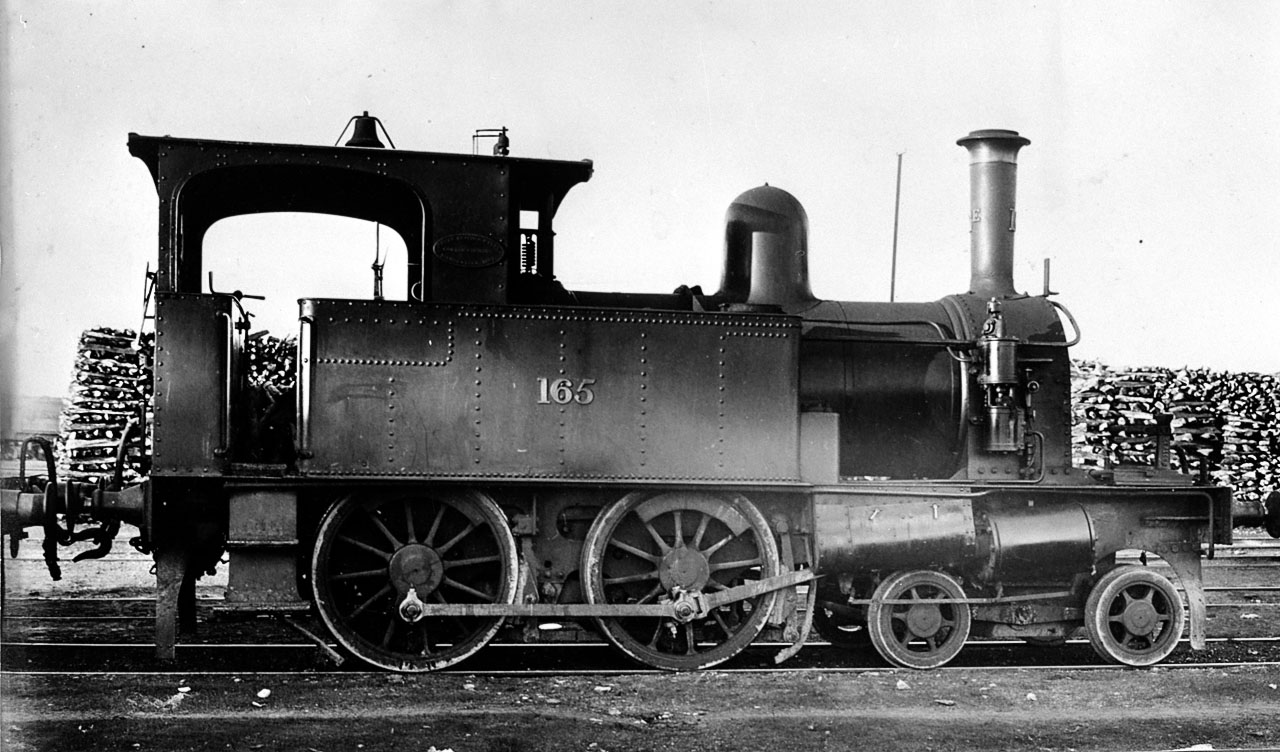
- South Australian Railways Ge class No. 165
Type and origin
- Power type: Steam
- Builder: Beyer, Peacock and Company
- Serial number: 3873 & 3874
- Build date: 1897
- Total produced: 2
Specifications
- Configuration
  - Whyte: 4-4-0T
  - UIC: 2'B T
- Gauge: 5 ft 3 in (1,600 mm)
- Driver dia.: 4 ft 0 in (1,219 mm)
- Length: 25 ft 7 in (7.80 m)
- Axle load: 10 long tons 11 cwt (23,600 lb or 10.7 t)
- Loco weight: 28 long tons 18 cwt (64,700 lb or 29.4 t)
- Fuel type: Coal
- Fuel capacity: 0 long tons 16 cwt (1,800 lb or 0.8 t)
- Water cap.: 460 imp gal (552 US gal; 2,091 L)
- Firebox
  - Grate area: 10.5 sq ft (0.98 m^{2})
- Boiler pressure: 140 psi (965 kPa)
- Heating surface
  - Firebox: 56 sq ft (5.2 m^{2})
  - Tubes: 547 sq ft (50.8 m^{2})
- Cylinders: 2
- Cylinder size: 13 in × 18 in (330 mm × 457 mm)
Performance figures
- Tractive effort: 7,814 lbf (34.76 kN)
Career
- Operators: South Australian Railways
- Class: Ge
- Number in class: 2
- Numbers: 165 & 166
- Withdrawn: 1929-1935
- Disposition: Both scrapped

The South Australian Railways Ge class locomotives were built by Beyer, Peacock and Company for the Glenelg Railway Company in 1897, entering service as numbers 11 and 12. They entered service on the South Australian Railways (SAR) as Ge class Nos. 165 and 166 on 16 December 1899 following the purchase of the Glenelg Railway Company. No. 166 was condemned on the 8th of April 1929, followed by No. 165 on 4 June 1935. They were both eventually scrapped.
