= Tobu Museum =

- 東武博物館
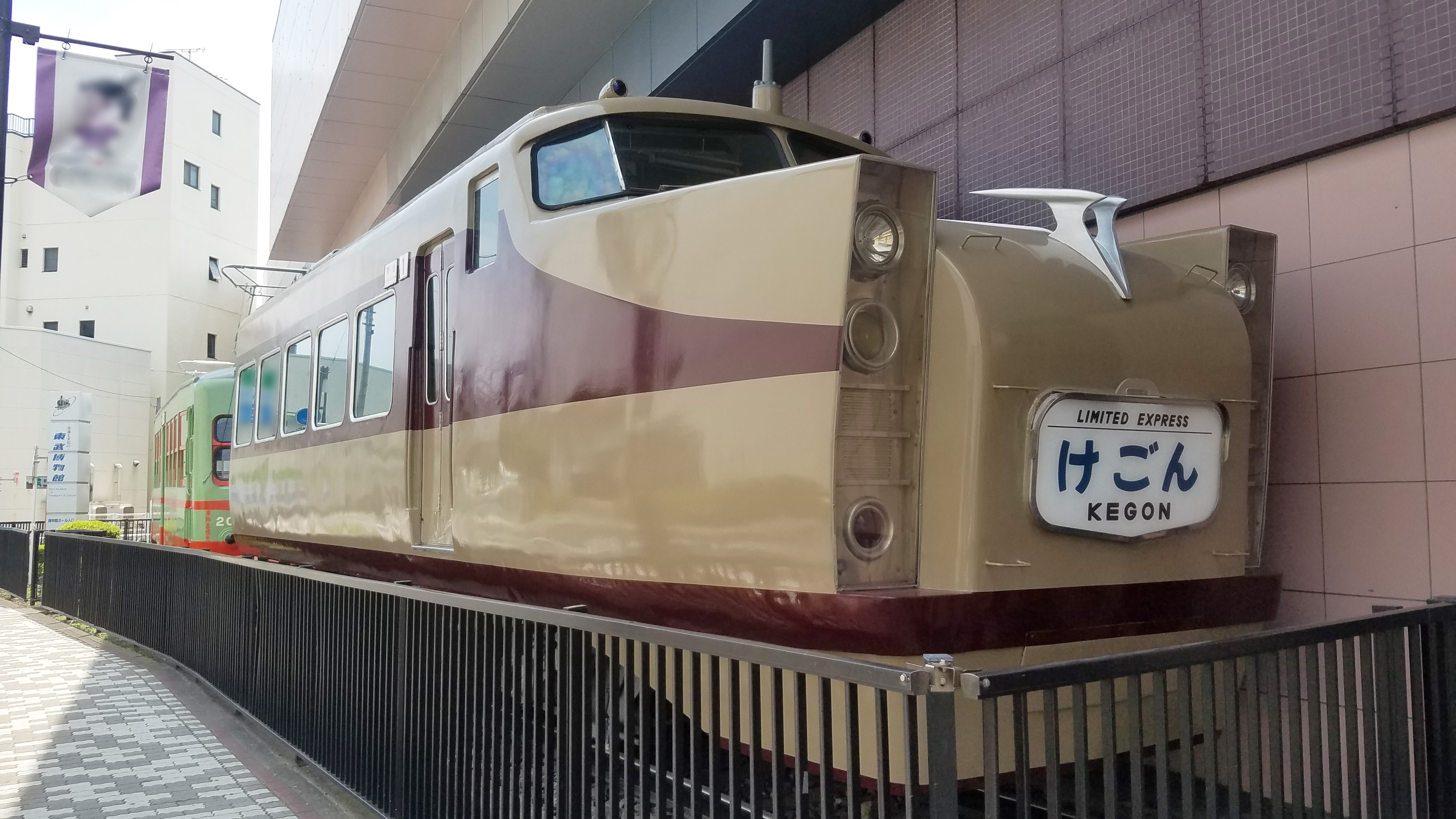
- 1720 series "DRC" car outside the museum

- Location within Japan
- Established: May 1989
- Location: Sumida, Tokyo Japan
- Coordinates: 35.723456°N 139.819037°E
- Type: Railway museum
- Public transit access: Higashi-Mukōjima Station
- Website: www.tobu.co.jp/museum

The Tobu Museum (東武博物館, Tōbu Hakubutsukan) is a railway museum in Sumida, Tokyo, Japan. It opened in May 1989, and is operated by Tobu Railway.

The museum was closed from January 2009 until June 2009 for refurbishment. It reopened on 22 July 2009.

== Exhibits ==
The following full-size vehicles are on display.

- B1 class steam locomotive – No. 5 (built 1898 by Beyer, Peacock & Company)
- B1 class steam locomotive – No. 6 (built 1898 by Beyer, Peacock & Company)
- ED101 class electric locomotive – No. 101 (later ED4000 class No. ED4001, built 1930, moved to museum from Ohmi Railway in January 2009)
- ED5010 class electric locomotive - No. ED5015 (built 1959)
- Class DeHa1 electric railcar – No. DeHa5 (built 1924)
- 1720 series "DRC" electric multiple unit car – cab section only (built 1960)
- 5700 series electric multiple unit car – No. MoHa5701 (built 1951, moved to museum in January 2009)
- Nikkō Tramway 200 series tramcar - No. 203 (built 1954)

The collection includes a reproduction of a station office Including automatic ticket gates outside with see-through covering, ticket vending machines, interlocking board, telephone and railroad exhibits. A season ticket issuing machine and "celebrate admission pass" is issued free of charge.

The museum also owns the 6-car Tobu 8000 series EMU set 8111, which was repainted into its original "royal beige" and "international orange" livery for a series of special event runs on Tobu Lines.

== Access ==
The museum is located underneath Higashi-Mukōjima Station on the Tobu Skytree Line. Visitors can view trains passing at close range from windows underneath the platform.

=== Address ===
4-28-16 Higashi-mukōjima, Sumida-ku, Tokyo
