= South Australian Railways Gd class =

Class of Australian 0-4-4WT locomotives

South Australia Railways Gd class
Type and origin
- Power type: Steam
- Builder: Beyer, Peacock and Company
- Serial number: 2044 & 2045
- Build date: 1880
- Total produced: 2
Specifications
- Configuration
  - Whyte: 0-4-4 well tank
  - UIC: B2 T
- Gauge: 5 ft 3 in (1,600 mm)
- Driver dia.: 4 ft 9 in (1,448 mm)
- Length: 29 ft 3 in (8.92 m)
- Axle load: 9 long tons 2 cwt (20,400 lb or 9.2 t)
- Loco weight: 32 long tons 2 cwt (71,900 lb or 32.6 t)
- Fuel type: Coal
- Fuel capacity: 1 long ton 3 cwt 2 qr (2,630 lb or 1.19 t)
- Water cap.: 467 imp gal (561 US gal; 2,123 L)
- Firebox
  - Grate area: 11.44 sq ft (1.063 m^{2})
- Boiler pressure: 145 psi (310 kPa)
- Heating surface
  - Firebox: 58 sq ft (5.4 m^{2})
  - Tubes: 578 sq ft (53.7 m^{2})
- Cylinders: 2
- Cylinder size: 14 in × 20 in (356 mm × 508 mm)
- Valve travel: −
- Train heating: −
Performance figures
- Power output: −
- Tractive effort: 7,629 lbf (33.94 kN)
Career
- Operators: South Australian Railways
- Class: Gd
- Number in class: 2
- Numbers: 163 & 164
- Withdrawn: 1925
- Disposition: Both scrapped

The South Australian Railways Gd class locomotives were built by Beyer, Peacock and Company for service on the Holdfast Bay railway line in 1880. They were numbered 4 and 5. In November 1881, both engines were sold to the Glenelg Railway Company and became their number 9 and 10. These locomotives entered service on the South Australian Railways in December 1899, following their purchase of the Glenelg Railway Company and thus classed Gd No. 163 and 164. Nos. 163 and 164 were both condemned as of 6 February 1925 and ultimately scrapped.
