= GNRI Class RT =

Class of 4 Irish 0-6-4T locomotives

Great Northern Railway class RT
Type and origin
- Power type: Steam
- Designer: C. Clifford
- Builder: Beyer, Peacock & Company
- Build date: 1908 (2), 1911 (2)
- Total produced: 4
Specifications
- Configuration
  - Whyte: 0-6-4T
- Gauge: 5 ft 3 in (1,600 mm)
- Driver dia.: 4 ft 3 in (1,295 mm)
- Loco weight: 56 long tons 0 cwt (125,400 lb or 56.9 t)
- Boiler pressure: 175 lbf/in^{2} (1,206.58 kPa)
- Cylinders: Two, inside
- Cylinder size: 17 in × 24 in (432 mm × 610 mm)
- Train heating: Steam
Performance figures
- Tractive effort: 18,075 lbf (80.40 kN)
Career
- Operators: GNR(I) → UTA
- Number in class: 4
- Numbers: GNRI: 22, 23, 166, 167; UTA: 22–25
- Withdrawn: 1958—1963
- Disposition: All scrapped

Great Northern Railway (Ireland) Class RT were set of set of four 0-6-4T tank locomotives designed by Charles Clifford. The success of the first two in 1908 led to the order for two more in 1911. They were used for shunting and transfer work around the docks and railways of Belfast.
