= Brookside, Sri Lanka =

Coordinates: 7°01′N 80°51′E

Brookside
- Village
- Interactive map of Brookside
- Country: Sri Lanka
- Province: Central Province
- District: Nuwara Eliya
- Time zone: UTC+5:30 (Sri Lanka Standard Time)

Brookside is a village in Sri Lanka. It is located within the Central Province. It is home to 1,115 people, primarily those of Tamil descent, as well a smaller population of Sinhalese people.

== History ==
The village was established in 1848 by the British. The village is the site of Brookside Estate, a tea farm.

== See also ==
- List of towns in Central Province, Sri Lanka
