= Beyer, Peacock and Company =

Railway locomotive manufacturer

Beyer, Peacock and Company Limited
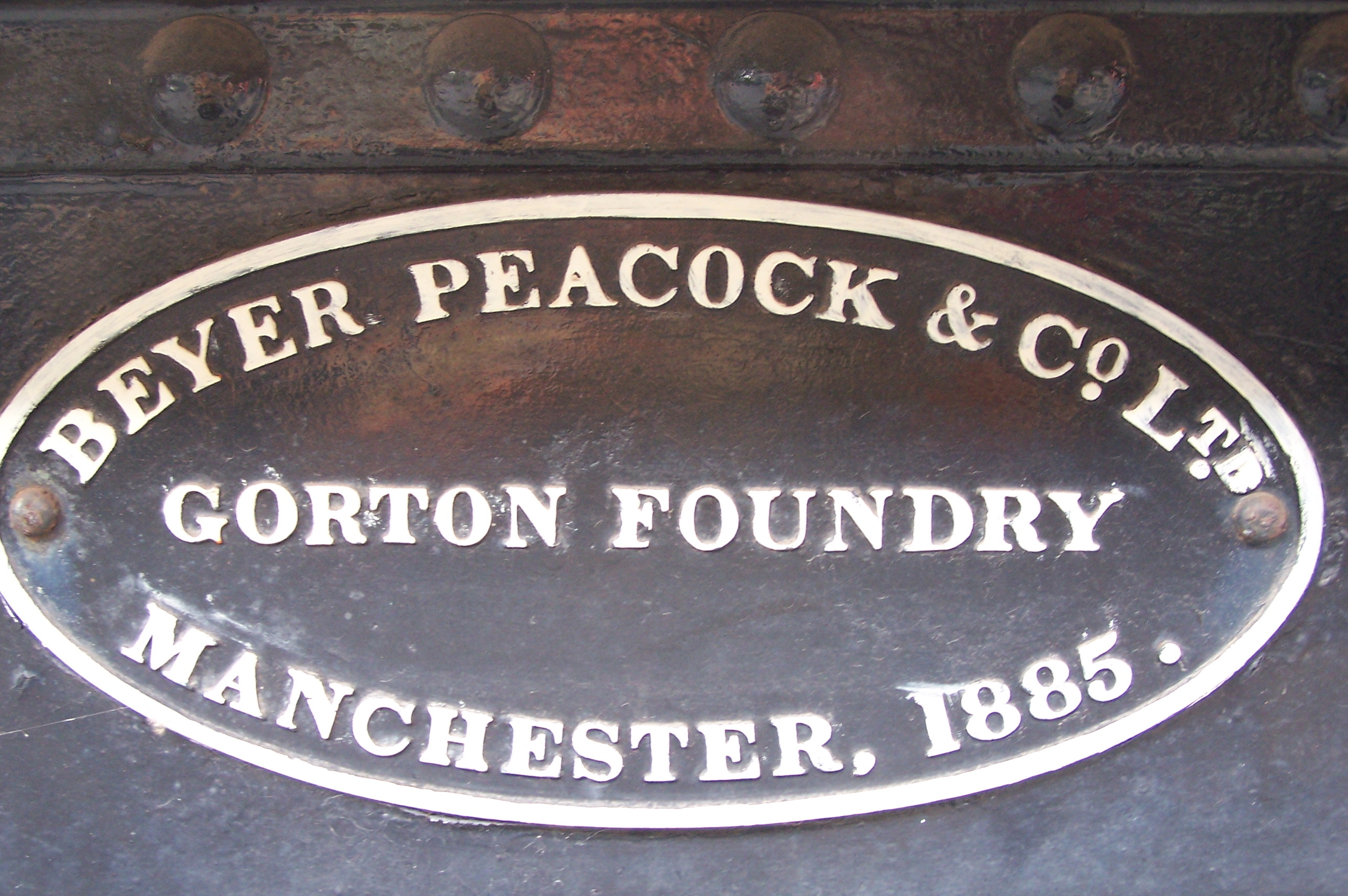
- A Beyer, Peacock and Company builder's plate from 1885
- Industry: Locomotive manufacturing
- Founded: 1854; 171 years ago, in England
- Founders: Charles Beyer; Richard Peacock; Henry Robertson
- Headquarters: Gorton, England
- Areas served: Africa, South America, Asia, Australia and South Pacific
- Products: Locomotives and machine tools

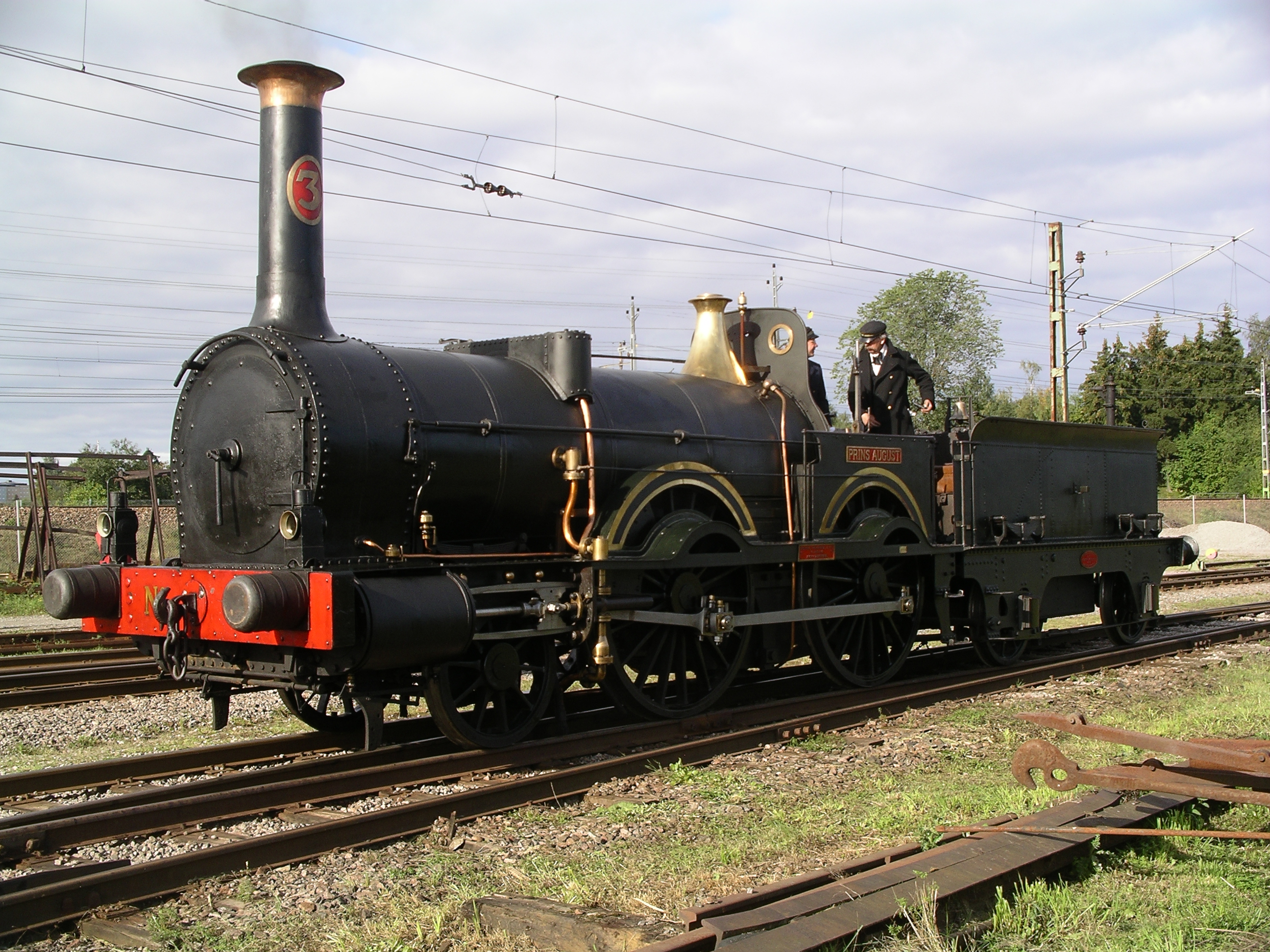
Prins August, built for Sweden in 1856, preserved at Swedish Railway Museum in Gävle, Sweden. It is said to be the oldest operating steam engine in the world.

Beyer, Peacock and Company was an English general engineering company and railway locomotive manufacturer with a factory in Openshaw, Manchester. Charles Beyer, Richard Peacock and Henry Robertson founded the company in 1854. The company closed its railway operations in the early 1960s. It retained its stock market listing until 1976, when it was bought and absorbed by National Chemical Industries of Saudi Arabia.

== Founders ==
German-born Charles Beyer had undertaken engineering training related to cotton milling in Dresden before moving to England in 1831 aged 21. He became draughtsman at Sharp, Roberts and Company's Atlas works in central Manchester, which manufactured cotton mill machinery and had just started building locomotives for the Liverpool and Manchester Railway. There he was mentored by head engineer and prolific inventor of cotton mill machinery Richard Roberts. By the time he resigned 22 years later he was well established as the company's head engineer; he had been involved in producing more than 600 locomotives.

Richard Peacock had been chief engineer of the Manchester, Sheffield and Lincolnshire Railway's locomotive works in Gorton when he resigned in 1854, confident in his ability to secure orders to build locomotives. Beyer's resignation presented Peacock with a partnership opportunity. However, the business at the outset (Beyer, Peacock & Co.) was a legal partnership and the partners were therefore liable for debts should the business fail; in a mid-Victorian economic climate of boom and bust, it was a risky venture. Beyer could raise £9,524 (nearly £900,000 in 2015) and Peacock £5,500, but they still required a loan from Charles Geach (founder of the Midland Bank and first treasurer to the Institution of Mechanical Engineers, of which Beyer and Peacock had been founding members). Soon afterwards, however, Geach died, the loan was recalled, and the whole project nearly collapsed. Thomas Brassey came to the rescue, persuading Henry Robertson to provide a £4,000 loan in return for being the third (sleeping) partner. It was not until 1883 that the company was incorporated as a private limited company and renamed Beyer, Peacock & Co. Ltd. In 1902 it took on its final form as a public limited company. (Note: The public company was incorporated as Beyer, Peacock & Co. (1902) Ltd; the "(1902)" was dropped in 1903.)

During the Great Depression, faced with competition from tramways and electric railways, the company began to look for alternatives so that they were not dependent on one product. In 1932 they acquired their first company and in 1949 formed a joint company with Metropolitan-Vickers to build locomotives other than steam. By 1953 Beyer, Peacock had acquired more than five subsidiary companies; two others followed five years later. In 1958 Beyer, Peacock (Hymek) Ltd was formed.

== Gorton Foundry ==
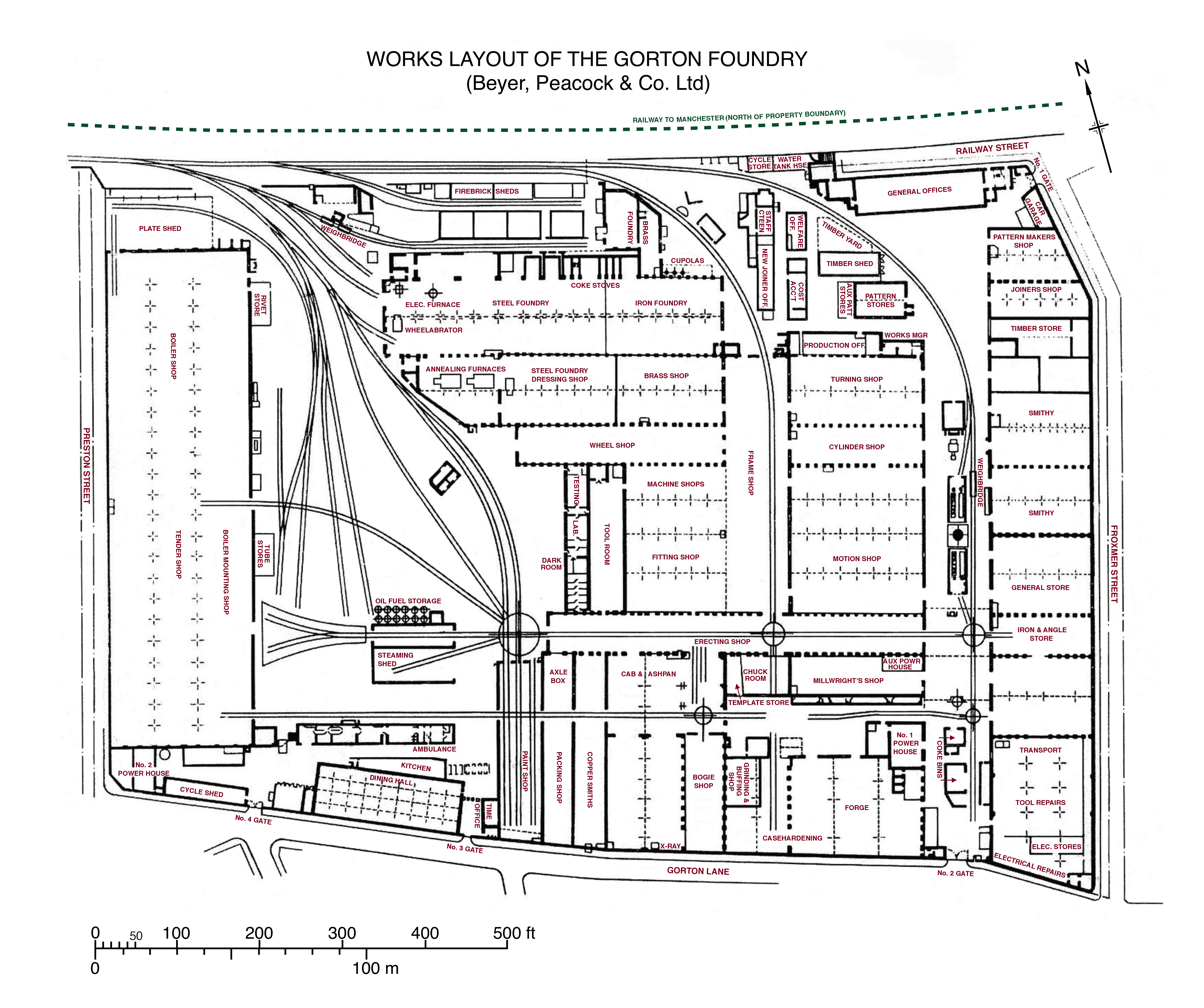
Layout of the Gorton Foundry workshops of Beyer, Peacock and Co. Ltd

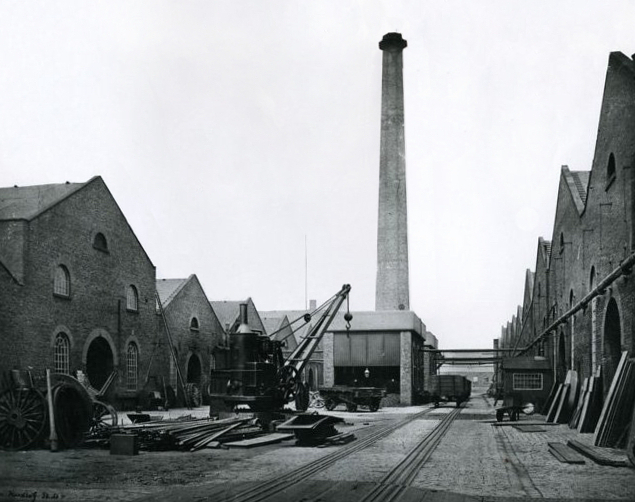
The Gorton Foundry in 1870

Beyer and Peacock started building their Gorton Foundry in 1854 two miles east from the centre of Manchester at Openshaw on a 12-acre site, on the opposite (south) side of the Manchester, Sheffield and Lincolnshire Railway (MS&LR) line from Peacock's previous works. (Note: The two works were adjacent, on either side of the line between the present-day stations of Ashburys and Gorton.) The site was chosen because land was cheaper than in the city, allowing ample room to expand, and there was a good water supply from an MS&LR reservoir. At the Foundry, Beyer designed and manufactured machine tools needed to build the locomotives, and oversaw locomotive design and production. Peacock dealt with the business side, often travelling to continental Europe to secure orders.

In July 1855 the first locomotive, built for the Great Western Railway, left Gorton Foundry. Between 1854 and 1868 the company built 844 locomotives, of which 476 were exported. The company sold mainly to the British colonies, Southern Africa and South America. The London and North Western Railway had commissioned Beyer, Peacock to build a single copy of its Dreadnought Class for the Pennsylvania Railroad, as the former railway's shops were not legally permitted to sell their locomotives. This locomotive, nine 2-6-0's built for the Costa Rica Railway, and four 2-6-6-2 Fairlies built for the Interoceanic Railway of Mexico were the only locomotives built by the company for North American railways.

During the First World War Beyer, Peacock manufactured artillery; in August 1915 Gorton Works was put under government control with production switching almost entirely to the war effort, especially heavy field artillery. During the Second World War, the company was again brought under government control but continued to build locomotives throughout the war.

== Condensing locomotives for underground railways ==
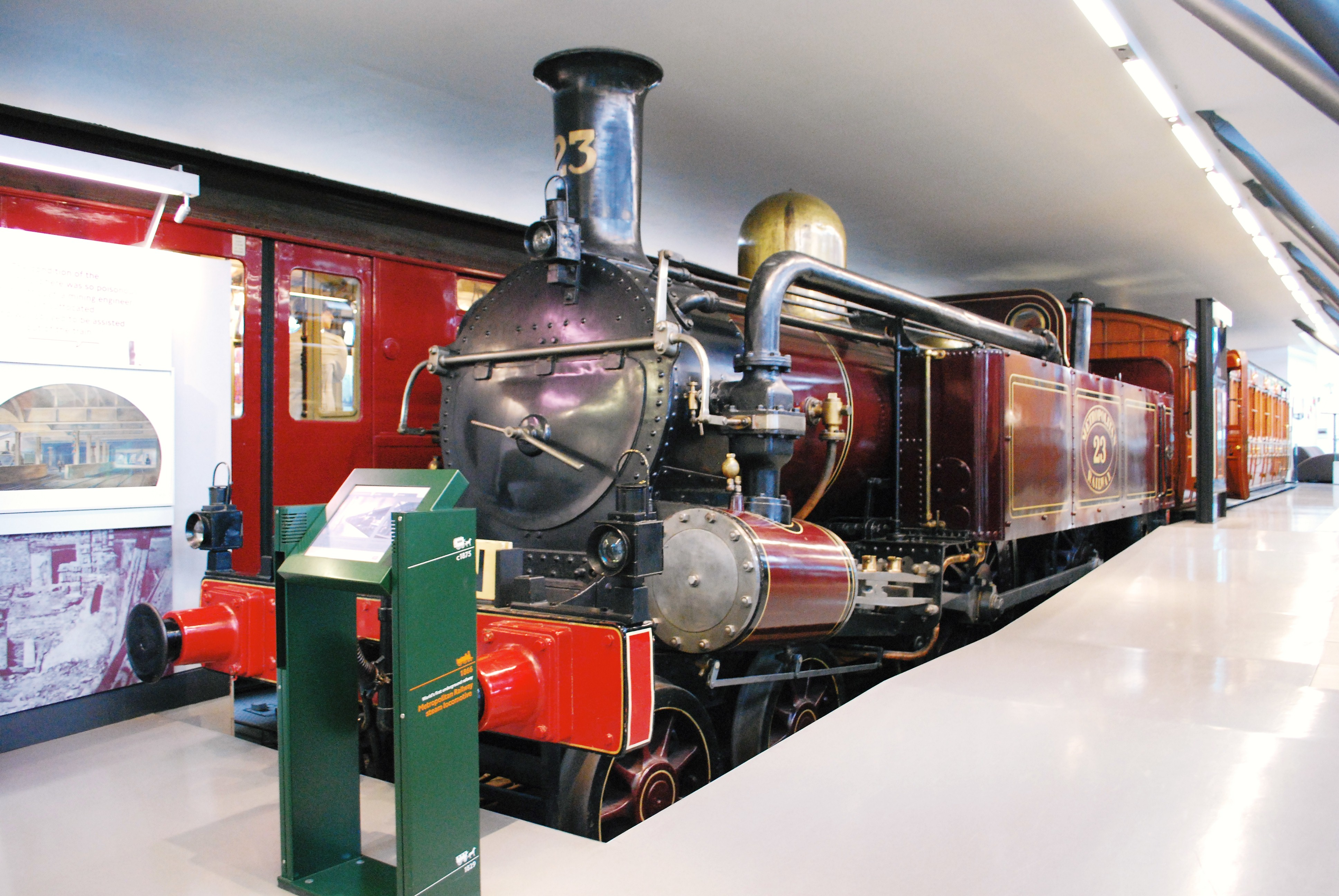
Beyer, Peacock's innovative condensing locomotive of 1871 – the inaugural motive power for London's underground railway. The large black pipe and another on the right-hand side took steam from the cylinders to the side tanks rather than ejecting it into the atmosphere as on conventional locomotives.

A technological innovation that strengthened the company's reputation was the world's first successful condensing (Note: By condensing steam, little of it emanated from the locomotives, and using coke (later, "smokeless" Welsh coal) greatly reduced smoke pollution.) locomotive design for London's first underground railway – the Metropolitan Railway A Class 4-4-0 tank engine. Between 1864 and 1886, 148 were built for various railways; most operated until the lines' electrification in 1905. The locomotives' main designer, Hermann Ludwig Lange (1837–92), was a native of Beyer's home town, Plauen, Saxony (now Germany) who had undertaken an apprenticeship followed by engineering training. Beyer had invited him to England in 1861 and employed him for the first year in the company workshops, then as a draughtsman under his direction. He became chief draughtsman in 1864 or 1865. After Beyer's death in 1876, he became chief engineer and co-manager of the company.

== Beyer-Garratt articulated locomotives ==
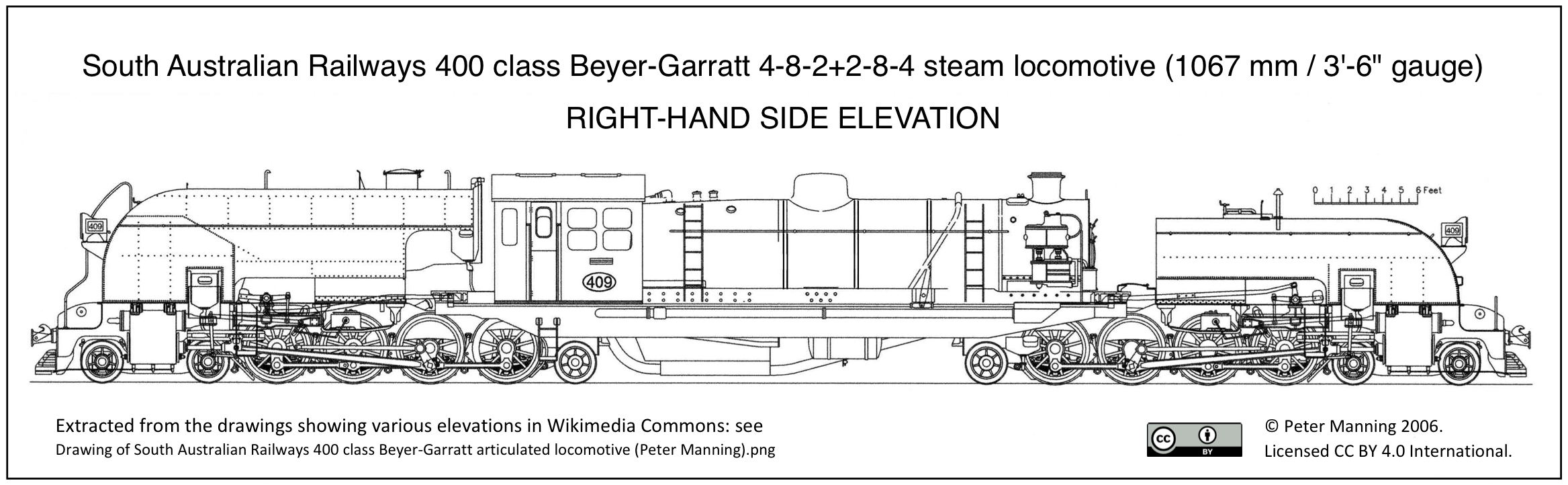
The three separate units of a Beyer-Garratt locomotive. The tractive effort of this locomotive was double that of its 4-8-0 predecessor. (Click to enlarge.)

An articulated locomotive design that became renowned in the 20th century was another innovation, the Garratt articulated locomotive, invented by Herbert William Garratt, who was granted a patent in 1908; Beyer, Peacock had sole rights of manufacture in Britain. After the patents ran out in 1928, the company began to use the name "Beyer-Garratt" to distinguish their locomotives. They became widely used throughout Africa, South America, Asia, Australia and the South Pacific, where difficult terrain and lightly laid, tightly curved track, usually narrow-gauge, severely limited the weight and power output of conventional locomotives. In Garratt's design, two girders holding a boiler (Note: Significant in the performance of the boiler, hence power output, was that the Garratt's firebox was no longer confined to the narrow space between a locomotive's frame but was constrained only by the much greater distance between girders.) and a cab were slung between two "engine" units, each with cylinders, wheels and motion. The weight of the locomotive was therefore spread over a considerable distance. Both engine units were topped by water tanks. The unit adjoining the cab end also held a fuel bunker.

Between 1909 and 1958, Beyer, Peacock built more than a thousand Garratts; significant types are listed below. Among them, three of the most significant are preserved (see the "Preserved steam locomotives" table below):

- first: the Tasmanian Government Railways K class, built in 1909 for the North East Dundas Tramway of western Tasmania
- most powerful: the South African Railways GL class of 1929
- last: the South African Railways NG G16 class locomotive of 1958.

== Diesel and electric locomotives ==
In the decade following 1954, the company built four types of diesel-powered locomotives and two electric types, listed below.

== Decline and closure ==
Locomotive manufacturing transformed rapidly in the late 1950s. In 1955 British Railways decided to switch from steam to diesel traction and by then overseas railways had done the same. A major problem the company soon faced was that it had chosen to make diesel-hydraulic locomotives when the Western Region had opted for lightweight locomotives with hydraulic transmission under the British Railways Modernisation Plan of 1955; but British Railways opted for diesel-electrics. (Note: Beyer Peacock (Hymek) Ltd was formed as a joint venture between Bristol Siddeley Engines, which was licensed to build Maybach engines, and Stone-Platt Industries, licensed to build Mekydro transmissions.) The company all but closed down the Gorton Foundry at the end of 1958.

In 1966, after 112 years of operation, all production ceased at Gorton Foundry. During that time, the company had built nearly 8,000 locomotives.

In 1976 Beyer Peacock was sold to Sheikh Mohammed Y. Al Bedrawi's National Chemical Industries of Saudi Arabia. The remaining industrial parts of the company then were Space Deck, a supplier of steel roofing units, and its main industrial company Richard Garrett Engineering, a company that manufactured machines which made cardboard boxes in factories in Dereham with 90 employees and in Suffolk with 500 employees.

Space Deck and Beyer Peacock International were praised in 1982 for having achieved increased profitability.

National Chemical Industries itself went bust in the early to mid-1980s.

As of 2012 the building that housed the former boiler shop, tender shop and boiler mounting shop – 550 feet (167 metres) in length – remained in use as part of the Hammerstone Road Depot of Manchester City Council.

Beyer, Peacock & Company Ltd last filed accounts to Companies House in 1989. Since then it has been compulsorily struck off several times, but restored on the request of creditors. No activity has been registered since 2015.

Companies House also lists another company called Beyer, Peacock & Company that was founded it 1998, and is now dormant. It is not clear what connection there is between the two firms.

== Archives ==
Beyer Peacock's archives are held at the Science and Industry Museum in Manchester.

== Gallery ==
(click to enlarge)

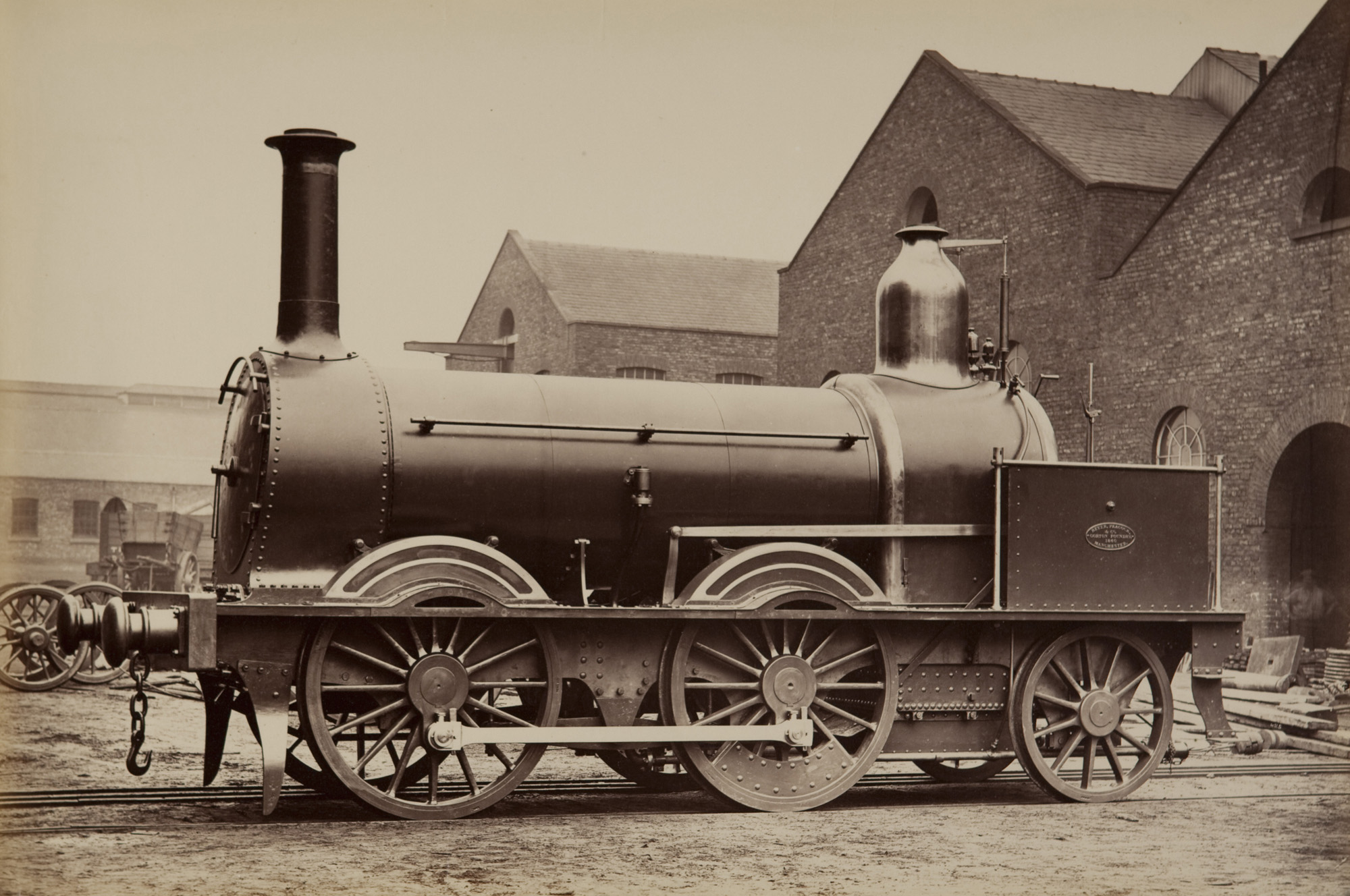
0-4-2 locomotive built for the Madras Railway in 1860 at the Gorton Foundry

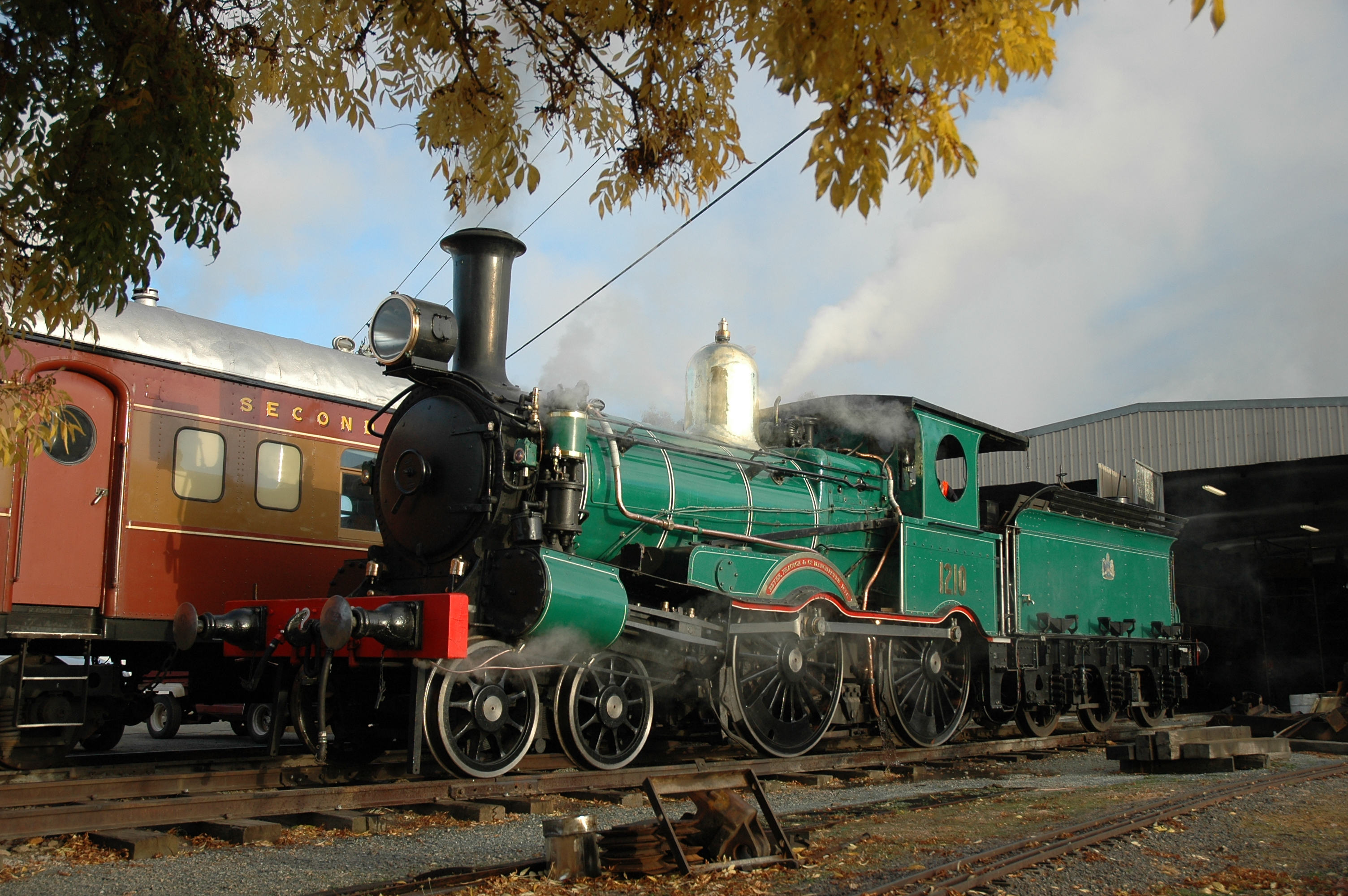
NSWGR Z12 class locomotive no. 1210 of 1878 at Canberra, Australia in 2011

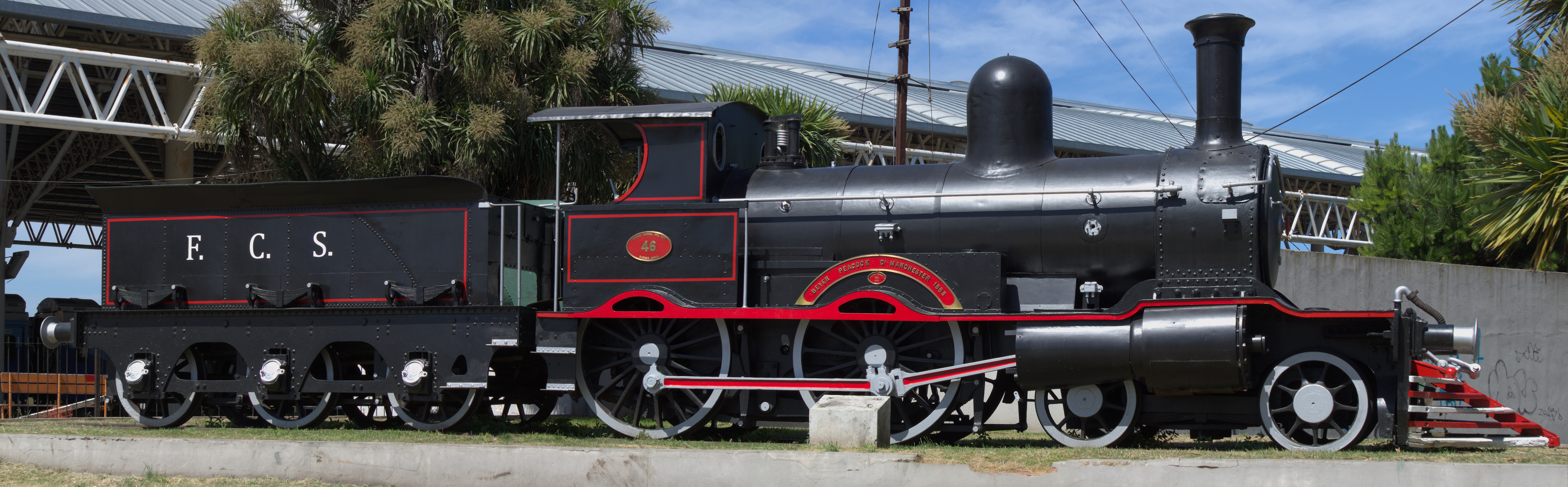
Ferrocarril del Sud 4-4-0 locomotive no. 46 of 1883 at Mar del Plata, Argentina in 2016

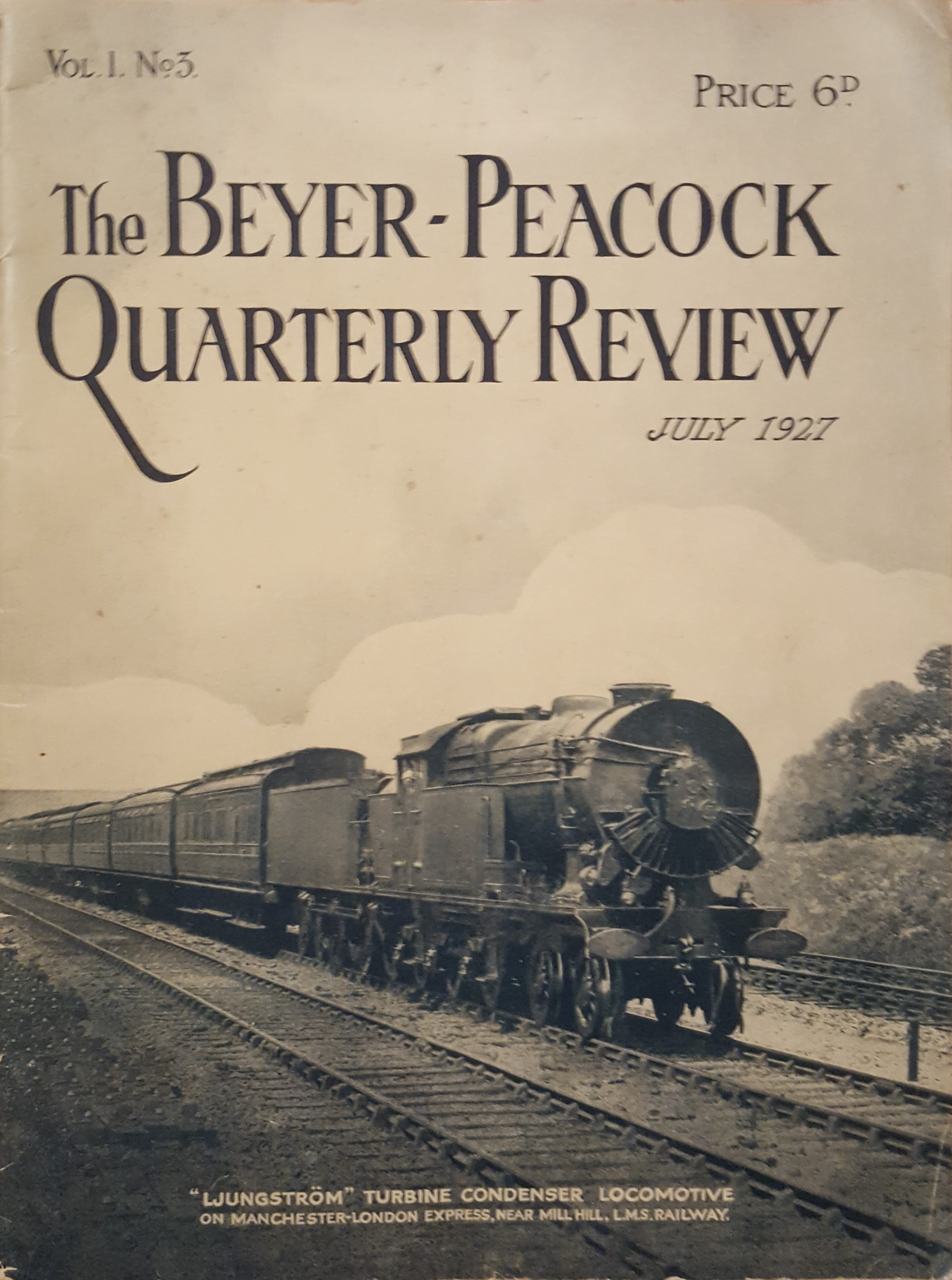
Experimental Ljungström turbine condenser locomotive in 1927; it was developed with the LMS Railway

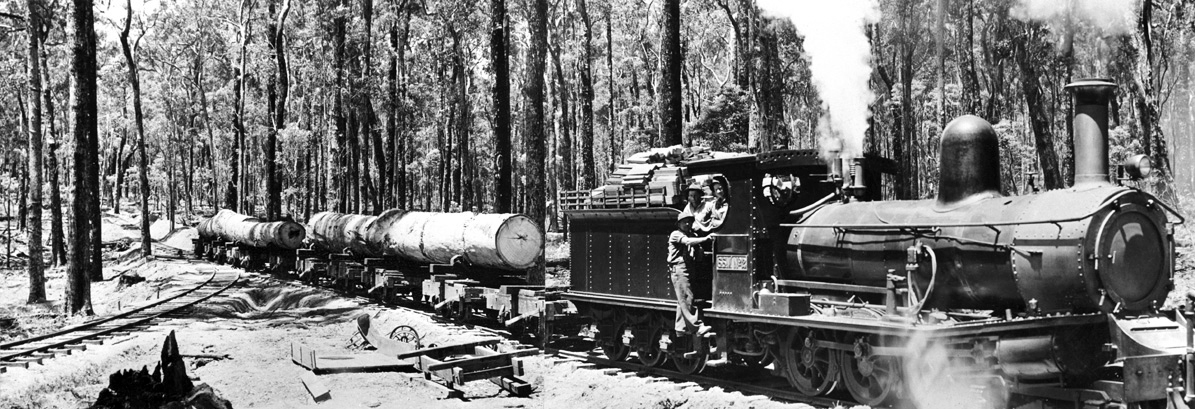
4-6-0 locomotive no. 2 of the State Saw Mills (of Western Australia), similar to the WAGR G class, in the 1940s

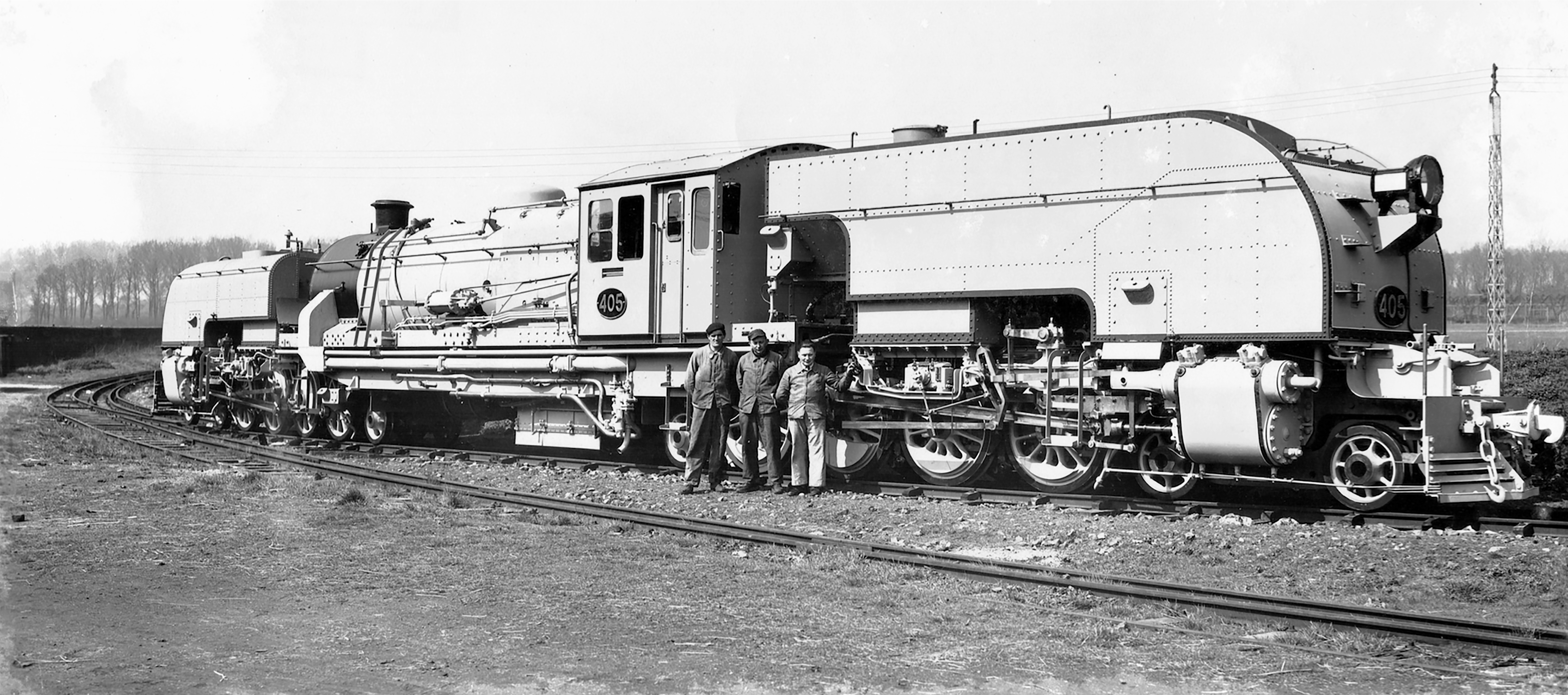
South Australian Railways 400 class no. 405 in "builder's photo" livery in 1953

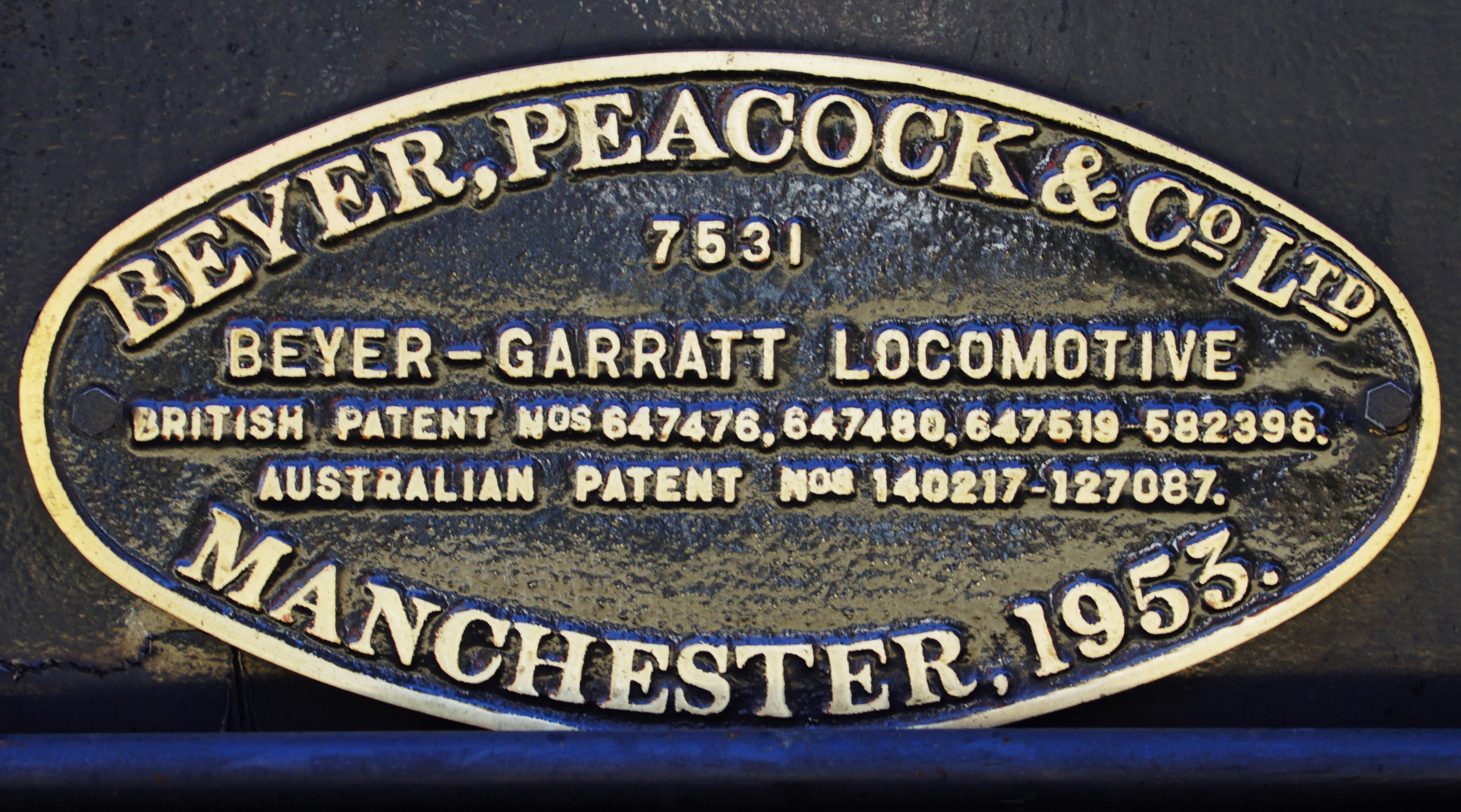
Builder's plate on preserved NSWGR AD60 class locomotive no. 6029 of 1953

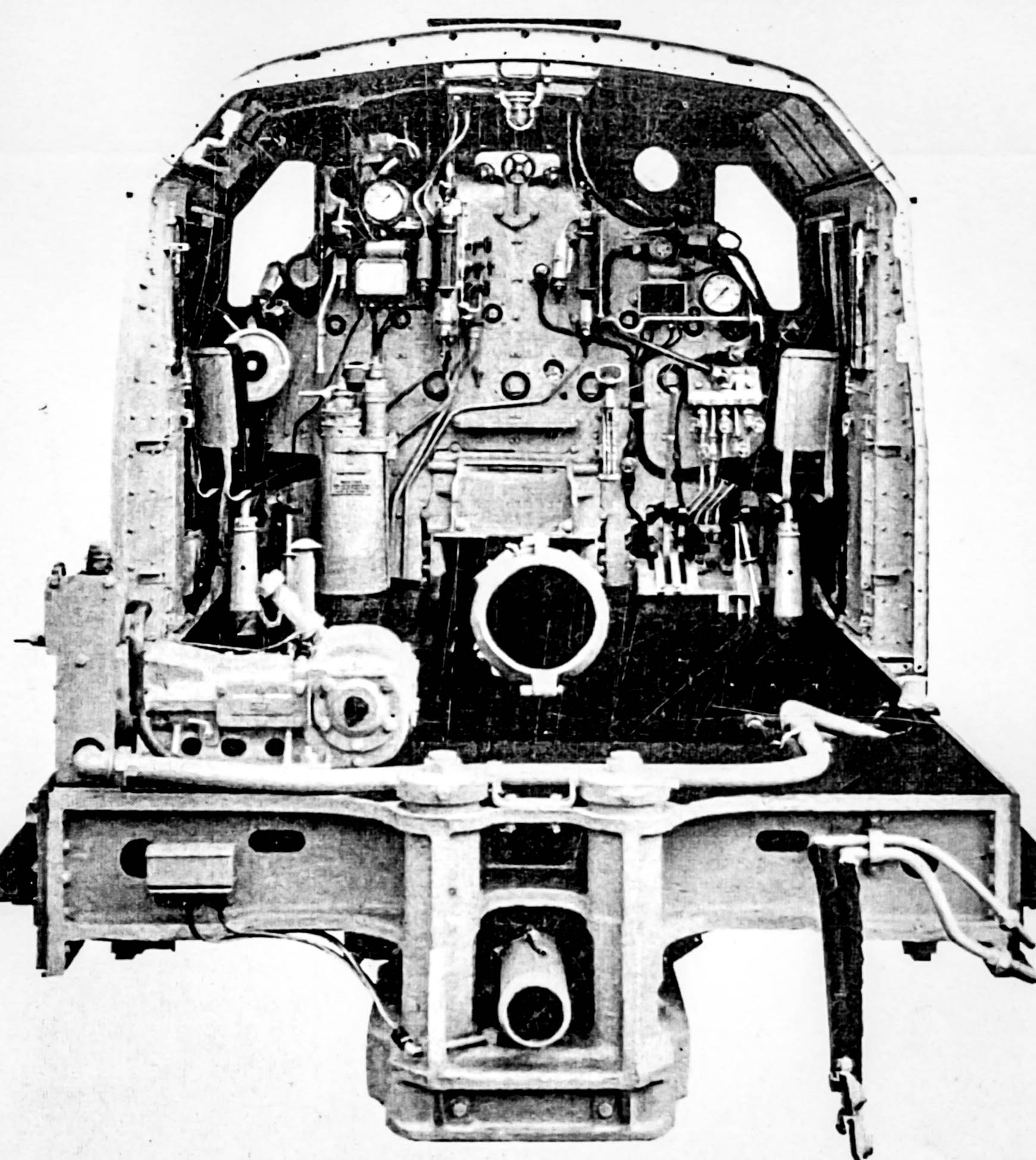
Fittings and controls on the 1952 NSWGR AD60 class Beyer-Garratt

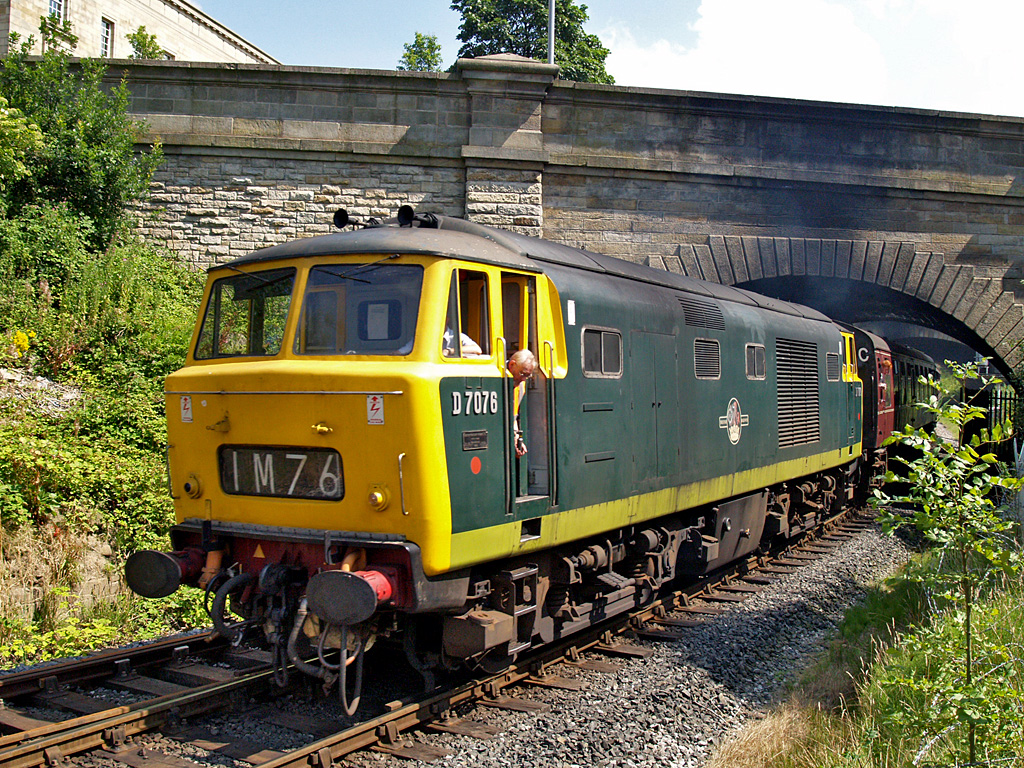
British Rail Class 35 Hymek diesel-hydraulic locomotive of 1961

== Classes of locomotives ==
=== Steam ===
==== Non-articulated ====
List shows delivery year(s), railway and locomotive class, wheel arrangement (Whyte notation) and number in order.

- 1859 Victorian Railways J class (1859) 2-2-2, later 2-4-0
- 1859 Victorian Railways P class 0-6-0
- 1861 Victorian Railways B class (1861) 2-4-0 (19)
- 1861 Victorian Railways O class 0-6-0 (11)
- 1864–1885 Metropolitan Railway A class 4-4-0T
- 1867–1868, 1872 Great Southern and Western Railway Class 101 0-6-0 (12)
- 1869 South Australian Railways G class 2-4-0T (5)
- 1869 Holdfast Bay Railway Company 2-4-0T (later, became South Australian Railways G class) (3)
- 1871–1886 District Railway 4-4-0T
- 1873–1926 Various locomotives for the Isle of Man Railway 2-4-0T
- 1880–1881 Midland Great Western Railway Class D 2-4-0 (6)
- 1874 Victorian Railways F class 2-4-0 (pattern engine)
- 1874 Victorian Railways T class 0-6-0 (pattern engine)
- 1875 South Australian Railways J class 0-6-0 (2)
- 1876 South Australian Railways U class 2-6-0T (8)
- 1876 South Australian Railways V class 0-4-4T (4)
- 1877–1882 South Australian Railways W class 2-6-0 (35)
- 1878 New South Wales Government Railways Z12 class 4-4-0
- 1879 South Australian Railways L class 4-4-0 (4)
- 1879–1884 South Australian Railways K class 0-6-4T (18)
- 1879 Victorian Railways M class 4-4-0T (pattern engine)
- 1879 Victorian Railways 'Old' R class 0-6-0 (pattern engine + 3)
- 1880 Holdfast Bay Railway Company (later, became South Australian Railways Gd class) 0-4-4WT (2)
- 1882, 1895, 1899 Sligo, Leitrim and Northern Counties Railway Leitrim Class 0-6-4T (5)
- 1884 South Australian Railways P class 2-4-0T (6)
- 1884 Victorian Railways 'Old' A class 4-4-0
- 1885–1898 South Australian Railways Y class 2-6-0
- 1885–1907 Tasmanian Government Railways C class 2-6-0 (27)
- 1888–1907 Silverton Tramway Y class 2-6-0; two 2-6-2 (50)
- 1889 Western Australian Government Railways G class 4-6-0 (7)
- 1897–1898 Belfast and Northern Counties Railway Class B 4-4-0 (5)
- 1897 Glenelg Railway Company 4-4-0T (later, became South Australian Railways Ge class) (2)
- 1898 Tobu Railway B1 class 4-4-0 (12 locos)
- 1902 Victorian Railways D^{D} class 4-6-0 (20)
- 1904 Great Northern Railway (Ireland) Q Class 4-4-0 (2)
- 1905 Dublin, Wicklow and Wexford Railway nos 65 & 66 0-6-0 (2)
- 1905 Dublin, Wicklow and Wexford Railway nos 67 & 68 4-4-0 (2)
- 1906–1920 Cork, Bandon and South Coast Railway Bandon Tank 4-6-0T (8)
- 1908, 1911 Great Northern Railway (Ireland) Class RT 0-6-4T (4)
- 1912, 1915 Silverton Tramway A class 4-6-0 (4)
- 1913, 1915 Great Northern Railway (Ireland) Class S & S2 4-4-0 (8)
- 1913, 1915 Great Northern Railway (Ireland) Class SG & SG2 0-6-0 (10)
- 1913 Great Northern Railway (Ireland) Class T 4-4-2T (5)
- 1915, 1947 Great Northern Railway (Ireland) Class U 4-4-0 (10)
- 1921, 1929–1930 Great Northern Railway (Ireland) Class T2 4-4-2T (10)
- 1921 Rhymney Railway R class 0-6-2T (6)
- 1922 Dublin and South Eastern Railway nos 15 & 16 2-6-0 (2)
- 1924 Dublin and South Eastern Railway nos 34 & 35 4-4-2T (2)
- 1928 Great Eastern Railway class S69 (later, became London and North Eastern Railway class B12) 4-6-0
- 1931 Great Western Railway 5700 class 0-6-0PT (25)
- 1932 Great Northern Railway (Ireland) Class V 4-4-0 (5)
- 1948 Great Northern Railway (Ireland) Class VS 4-4-0 (5)
- 1949 Sligo, Leitrim and Northern Counties Railway Lough Class 0-6-4T (2)
- 1951–1952 Silverton Tramway W class 4-8-2 (4)
- 1951–1952 Western Australian Government Railways W class 4-8-2 (60)
- 1955 Western Australian Government Railways V class 2-8-2 (sub-contracted to Robert Stephenson and Hawthorns) (24)

==== Beyer-Garratt (articulated) ====
List shows delivery year(s), railway and locomotive class, wheel arrangement (Whyte notation) and number in order.

- 1909 Tasmanian Government Railways K class
- 1910 Darjeeling Himalayan Railway D class
- 1911 Western Australian Government Railways M class 2-6-0+0-6-2 (6)
- 1913 Western Australian Government Railways Ms class 2-6-0+0-6-2 (7)
- 1925 London and North Eastern Railway class U1
- 1926 Victorian Railways G class
- 1927 London, Midland and Scottish Railway Garratt
- 1928 New Zealand Railways G class
- 1928 South African Railways GL class
- 1928, 1946 Ceylon Government Railways Class C1
- 1930 Ceylon Government Railways Class H1
- 1936–1939 Fyansford Cement Works Railway (nos 1&2)
- 1939 South African class NG G16
- 1940–1952 Rhodesia Railways 15th class
- 1949 East African Railways 56 class
- 1951 Queensland Railways Beyer-Garratt class
- 1951 South Australian Railways 400 class 4-8-2+2-8-4 (10)
- 1952 RFFSA 4-8-2+2-8-4 (6)(serial numbers 6966 to 6969 & 7136 to 7137)
- 1952–1954, 1957 New South Wales Government Railways AD60 class 4-8-4+4-8-4 (42)
- 1954-68 Rhodesia Railways 20th class
- 1955 East African Railways 59 class
- 1956 South African Railways GMA/M Class

=== Steam turbine ===
- 1935 Beyer-Ljungström steam turbine locomotive, under licence, for the LMS

=== Diesel ===
- 1954–56 Western Australian Government Railways X class
- 1961–63 British Rail Class 35
- 1962 British Rail Class 25
- 1964 British Rail Class 17 (as sub-contractor to Clayton Equipment Company)

=== Electric ===
- 1956–58 New South Wales 46 class
- 1960–62 British Rail Class 82

== Preserved locomotives ==
Click "Show" to display.

Preserved steam locomotives built by Beyer, Peacock
BP No.	Built	Company built for	Locomotive number	Class	Wheel arrangement	Preserved at
33	1856	Statens Järnvägar	3 (43) Prins August	B	2-4-0	On display at Swedish Railway Museum, Gävle
239	1861	Statens Järnvägar	22 (506) Thor	Ä(Qä)	0-4-2T	On display at Swedish Railway Museum, Gävle
295	1863	T.B./later NORTE	29 Basconia		4-4-0T	On display at Abando Station, Bilbao
533	1865	Maatschappij tot Exploitatie van Staatsspoorwegen	13 (NS 705)	9-16	2-4-0	On display at Dutch Railway Museum, Utrecht
710	1866	Metropolitan Railway	23	A	4-4-0T	London Transport Museum, at Covent Garden
627	1866	Statens järnvägar	75 Göta	A(Aa)	2-2-2	On display at Swedish Railway Museum, Gävle
809	1867	Statens järnvägar	93 Jernsida	G(Gc)	0-6-0	Nynäs, Swedish Railway Museum, Gävle, see 1442
846	1868	St. Petersburg & Helsingfors Railway	9	B1	0-4-2T	Finnish Railway Museum, Hyvinkää
992	1870	Norwegian State Railways	21 Alf	III	2-4-0T	Norwegian Railway Museum, Hamar
1253	1873	Isle of Man Railway	1 Sutherland		2-4-0T	Cosmetically Restored 2019 I.o.M.S.R.S.A
1255	1873	Isle of Man Railway	3 Pender		2-4-0T	On display at the Manchester Museum of Science and Industry (sectioned exhibit)
1412	1874	London and South Western Railway	30587	LSWR 0298 Class	2-4-0WT	On display at the Locomotion Museum
1414	1874	London and South Western Railway	30585	LSWR 0298 Class	2-4-0T	On display at the Buckinghamshire Railway Centre
1416	1874	Isle of Man Railway	4 Loch		2-4-0T	In service (Isle of Man Railway)
1417	1874	Isle of Man Railway	5 Mona		2-4-0WT	Cosmetically Restored (Isle of Man Railway)
1442	1874	Statens järnvägar	161 Wik	G(Gc)	0-6-0	Nynäs, Swedish Railway Museum, Gävle marked Gc 93
1524	1875	Isle of Man Railway	6 Peveril		2-4-0T	Cosmetically Restored 1994 I.o.M.S.R.S.A
1647	1877	NSW Government Railways	1905	Z19	0-6-0	NSW Rail Museum
1767	1878	NSW Government Railways	120 (1210 after 1924)	Z12 class	4-4-0	Canberra Railway Museum
1827	1879	Beyer, Peacock and Company	1827		0-4-0ST	Operational at Foxfield Railway
1933	1880	Bergslagernas Järnvägar	27	K	0-6-0	Nynäs, Swedish Railway Museum, Gävle
1950	1880	Manx Northern Railway	3 Thornhill		2-4-0T	Privately preserved (Isle of Man)
1958	1880	Isle of Man Railway	7 Tynwald		2-4-0T	Dismantled for spares. (Frames Southwold Railway)
1989	1881	Lancashire and Yorkshire Railway	752	L&YR Class 23	0-6-0ST	Keighley & Worth Valley Railway
2101	1881	Maatschappij tot Exploitatie van Staatsspoorwegen	326 (NS 1326)	301-475	2-4-0	On display at Dutch Railway Museum, Utrecht
2237	1883	Ferrocarril del Sud	46	?	4-4-0	Mar del Plata railway station on static display
2464	1885		47	John Bull	0-4-0VB	National Tramway Museum
2601	1886	Mersey Railway/J. & A. Brown	1 The Major	I	0-6-4T	NSW Rail Museum, Thirlmere, NSW, Australia
2605	1886	Mersey Railway	5 Cecil Raikes	I	0-6-4T	Museum of Liverpool
2711	1886	Western Australian Government Railways	A11	A	2-6-0	Meredith, Victoria, Australia?
2734	1886		131	84	0-4-0VB	National Tramway Museum
2840	1887	Lancashire and Yorkshire Railway	957	L&YR Class 25	0-6-0	Keighley & Worth Valley Railway
3276	1890	Ferrocarril Alcoy Gandia	2 Villalonga		2-6-2T	On display at Al-Azraq Square, Alcoi, Spain
3282	1891	Ferrocarril Alcoy Gandia	7 Cocentaina		2-6-2T	On display at Gandia station, Spain
3402	1891	NSW Government Railways	3203	C32	4-6-0	NSW Rail Museum
3413	1892	NSW Government Railways	3214	C32	4-6-0	Valley Heights Locomotive Depot Heritage Museum
3436	1892	NSW Government Railways	3237	C32	4-6-0	Operational, Lachlan Valley Railway
3610	1894	Isle of Man Railway	8 Fenella		2-4-0T	Withdrawn 2020 (Isle of Man Railway)
3641	1894	Nippon Railway, Japan	B104	B10	4-4-0 -> 4-4-2T	Kominato Railway, Ichihara, Chiba, Japan
3815	1896	Isle of Man Railway	9 Douglas		2-4-0T	Cosmetically Restored 2025 I.o.M.S.R.S.A
3824	1896	Companhia Mogiana de Estradas de Ferro	302		4-6-0	Stored, awaiting rebuild in Campinas, Brazil
3911	1897	Nippon Railway, Japan	5540	5500	4-4-0	Ome Railway Park, Ome, Tokyo, Japan
4028	1898	Tobu Railway, Japan	5	B1	4-4-0	Tobu Museum, Sumida, Tokyo, Japan
4029	1898	Tobu Railway, Japan	6	B1	4-4-0	Tobu Museum, Sumida, Tokyo, Japan
4221	1901	NSW Government Railways	3265 Hunter	C32	4-6-0	Operational, Powerhouse Museum
4231	1901	Belfast & County Down Railway	30	30	4-4-2T	On display at Ulster Folk & Transport Museum, Cultra
4372	1902	NSW Government Railways	5069	D50	2-8-0	Dorrigo Steam Railway & Museum
4662	1905	Isle of Man Railway	10 G.H. Wood		2-4-0T	Withdrawn 2018 (Isle of Man Railway)
4663	1905	Isle of Man Railway	11 Maitland		2-4-0T	Restored 2009-2022 (Isle of Man Railway)
4748	1906	Central Uruguay Railway	88	N	2-6-0	On display (Paysandú station, Uruguay)
4750	1906	Central Uruguay Railway	92	N	2-6-0	On display in bad shape (San José, Uruguay)
4751	1906	Central Uruguay Railway	93	N	2-6-0	On display (Young, Uruguay)
4943	1907	Central Uruguay Railway	96	N	2-6-0	On display (City bus terminal, Artigas, Uruguay)
5054	1908	NSW Government Railways	5112	D50	2-8-0	Bathurst
5074	1909	NSW Government Railways	5132	D50	2-8-0	Dorrigo Steam Railway & Museum
5126	1908	Isle of Man Railway	12 Hutchinson		2-4-0T	Withdrawn 2019 (Isle of Man Railway)
5292	1909	Tasmanian Government Railways	K1	K	0-4-0+0-4-0	Welsh Highland Railway (Caernarfon)
5382	1910	Isle of Man Railway	13 Kissack		2-4-0T	In Service (Isle of Man Railway)
5399	1910	Central Uruguay Railway	119	N3	2-6-0	In working order (CEFU, Montevideo, Uruguay)
5400	1910	Central Uruguay Railway	120	N3	2-6-0	In service (AUAR, Montevideo, Uruguay)
2254	1911	South Maitland Railways	10, 17–20, 22–28, 30–31	10	2-8-2T	2 Operational, 12 in
5548	1912	Victorian Railways	D^{2} 604	D^{2}	4-6-0	On display at ARHS Vic Railway Museum, Australia
5757	1913	Great Northern Railway (Ireland)	171 Slieve Gullion	GNRI Class S	4-4-0	Operational with the Railway Preservation Society of Ireland, Whitehead
5807	1914	NSW Government Railways	3112	C30	4-6-4T	Stored, Private ownership, Canberra
5837	1914	Tobu Railway, Japan	30	B3	4-4-0	Katayama Park, Sano,Tochigi, Japan
5841	1914	Tobu Railway, Japan	34	B3	4-4-0	Haginaka Park, Ota,Tokyo, Japan
6112	1922	Dublin and South Eastern Railway	GSR 461	DSER 15 and 16	2-6-0	Operational with the Railway Preservation Society of Ireland, Whitehead
6268	1926	Victorian Railways	G 42	G	2-6-0+0-6-2	Puffing Billy Railway
6296	1926	Isle of Man Railway	16 Mannin		2-4-0T	Dismantled 2020-2021 (Isle of Man Railway)
1572	1928	Great Eastern Railway	8572	GER Class S69	4-6-0	Operational at the North Norfolk Railway
6639	1930	South African Railways	2352	GL	4-8-2+2-8-4	Manchester Museum of Science and Industry
6733	1932	Great Northern Railway (Ireland)	85 Merlin	GNRI Class V	4-4-0	Railway Preservation Society of Ireland, Whitehead, Co. Antrim (run by); Ulster Folk & Transport Museum, Cultra, Belfast (owned)
6841	1937	Baddesley Colliery	6841 William Francis	Beyer-Garratt	0-4-0+0-4-0	Bressingham Steam and Gardens
6935	1939	Fyansford Cement Works Railway	2		2-6-0+0-6-2	Bellarine Railway, Victoria, Australia
7242	1949	Sligo, Leitrim and Northern Counties Railway	Lough Erne	SLNCR Lough class	0-6-4T	Operational with the Railway Preservation Society of Ireland, Whitehead
7340	1950	Rhodesia Railways	398 Isidumuka	15A	4-6-4+4-6-4	Flying Fifteen Group, Steam Incorporated Paekākāriki
7428	1951	South African Railways	127	NGG 16	2-6-2+2-6-2	Puffing Billy Railway, Victoria, Australia
7430	1951	South African Railways	129	NGG 16	2-6-2+2-6-2	Puffing Billy Railway, Victoria, Australia
7624	1951	South Australian Railways	402	400 class	4-8-2+2-8-4	National Railway Museum, Port Adelaide
7631	1951	South Australian Railways	409	400 class	4-8-2+2-8-4	National Railway Museum, Port Adelaide
7582	1953	Rhodesia Railways	509	14A	4-8-2+2-8-4	Mainline Steam Heritage Trust Plimmerton New Zealand
	1952	RFFSA	612		4-8-2+2-8-4	RFFSA Central Station Museum, Recife, Pernambuco
7531	1954	NSW Government Railways	6029	AD60	4-8-4+4-8-4	Canberra Railway Museum
7650	1955	East African Railways	5918	EAR 59 class	4-8-2+2-8-4	Nairobi Railway Museum
7702	1955	East African Railways	5930	EAR 59 class	4-8-2+2-8-4	Nairobi Railway Museum
7541	1956	NSW Government Railways	6039	AD60	4-8-4+4-8-4	Dorrigo Steam Railway & Museum
7542	1956	NSW Government Railways	6040	AD60	4-8-4+4-8-4	NSW Rail Museum
7544	1956	NSW Government Railways	6042	AD60	4-8-4+4-8-4	Dorrigo Steam Railway & Museum
7681	1956	South African Railways	4083	GMAM	4-8-2+2-8-4	Mainline Steam Heritage Trust Mercer, New Zealand
7863	1958	South African Railways	NG138	NGG 16	2-6-2+2-6-2	Welsh Highland Railway (Caernarfon)
7865	1958	South African Railways	NG140	NGG 16	2-6-2+2-6-2	Welsh Highland Railway (Caernarfon)
7868	1958	South African Railways	NG143	NGG 16	2-6-2+2-6-2	Welsh Highland Railway (Caernarfon)

Preserved diesel locomotives built by Beyer, Peacock
7911	1962	British Railways	D7017	BR Class 35 Hymek	Bo-Bo	West Somerset Railway
7912	1962	British Railways	D7018	BR Class 35 Hymek	Bo-Bo	West Somerset Railway
7923	1962	British Railways	D7029	BR Class 35 Hymek	Bo-Bo	Severn Valley Railway
7980	1963	British Railways	D7076	BR Class 35 Hymek	Bo-Bo	East Lancs Railway
8038	1965	British Railways	D7628, 25278 Sybilla	BR Class 25	Bo-Bo	North Yorkshire Moors Railway - Operational
8039	1965	British Railways	D7629, 25279	BR Class 25	Bo-Bo	Great Central Railway (Nottingham) - Operational
8043	1965	British Railways	D7633, 25283	BR Class 25	Bo-Bo	Dean Forest Railway - Operational
8069	1966	British Railways	D7659, 25309	BR Class 25	Bo-Bo	Peak Rail - Operational

Preserved electric locomotives built by Beyer, Peacock
BP No.	Built	Company built for	Locomotive number(s)	Class	Wheel arrangement	Preserved at
	1956	NSWGR	4601	46 Class	Co-Co	Valley Heights Locomotive Depot Heritage Museum
	1956	NSWGR	4602	46 Class	Co-Co	Dorrigo Steam Railway & Museum
	1956	NSWGR	4615	46 Class	Co-Co	Junee Roundhouse Museum on permanent loan from the Sydney Electric Train Society
	1956	NSWGR	4627	46 Class	Co-Co	Sydney Electric Train Society
	1956	NSWGR	4638	46 Class	Co-Co	NSW Rail Museum, Broadmeadow Locomotive Depot
	1961	British Railways	E3054, 82008	BR Class 82	Bo-Bo	Barrow Hill Engine Shed

== Select bibliography ==
- Atkins, P. (1999). The golden age of steam locomotive building. Atlantic. pp. 66–67. ISBN 978-0906899878.
- Durrant, A.E. (1981). Garratt locomotives of the world (rev. and enl. ed.). David & Charles. ISBN 0715376411.
- Hills, Richard L.; Patrick, D. (1982). Beyer, Peacock, locomotive builders to the world. Glossop: Transport Publishing Co. ISBN 0-903839-41-5.
- Lowe, James W. (1989) [1975]. "Beyer, Peacock & Company". British steam locomotive builders. London: Guild Publishing. pp. 59–64. ISBN 0900404213.
