= Ragala =

- Village
- Location within Sri Lanka
- Country: Sri Lanka
- Province: Central Province
- District: Nuwara Eliya District
- Time zone: UTC+5:30 (Sri Lanka Standard Time Zone)

Ragala is a small town in Central Province, Sri Lanka. It is part of Walapane Pradeshiya Sabha, in the Nuwara Eliya District.

== Agriculture ==
The town's agricultural exports consist of tea leaves to tea production companies such as Dilmah.

Ragala is also home to various farms growing crops such as pears and apples.

== Transport ==
It used to be served by a narrow gauge branchline of the national railway network, part of which is being rebuilt to broad gauge.

The village is served by public busses.

== Services ==
The village has a National Savings Bank branch.

== See also ==
- Railway stations in Sri Lanka
