= Broadstone, Dublin =

One of three divisions of Phibsboro, inner suburb of Dublin, Ireland

Coordinates: 53°21′N 6°16′W

Broadstone An Clochán Leathan (Irish)
- Inner suburban area
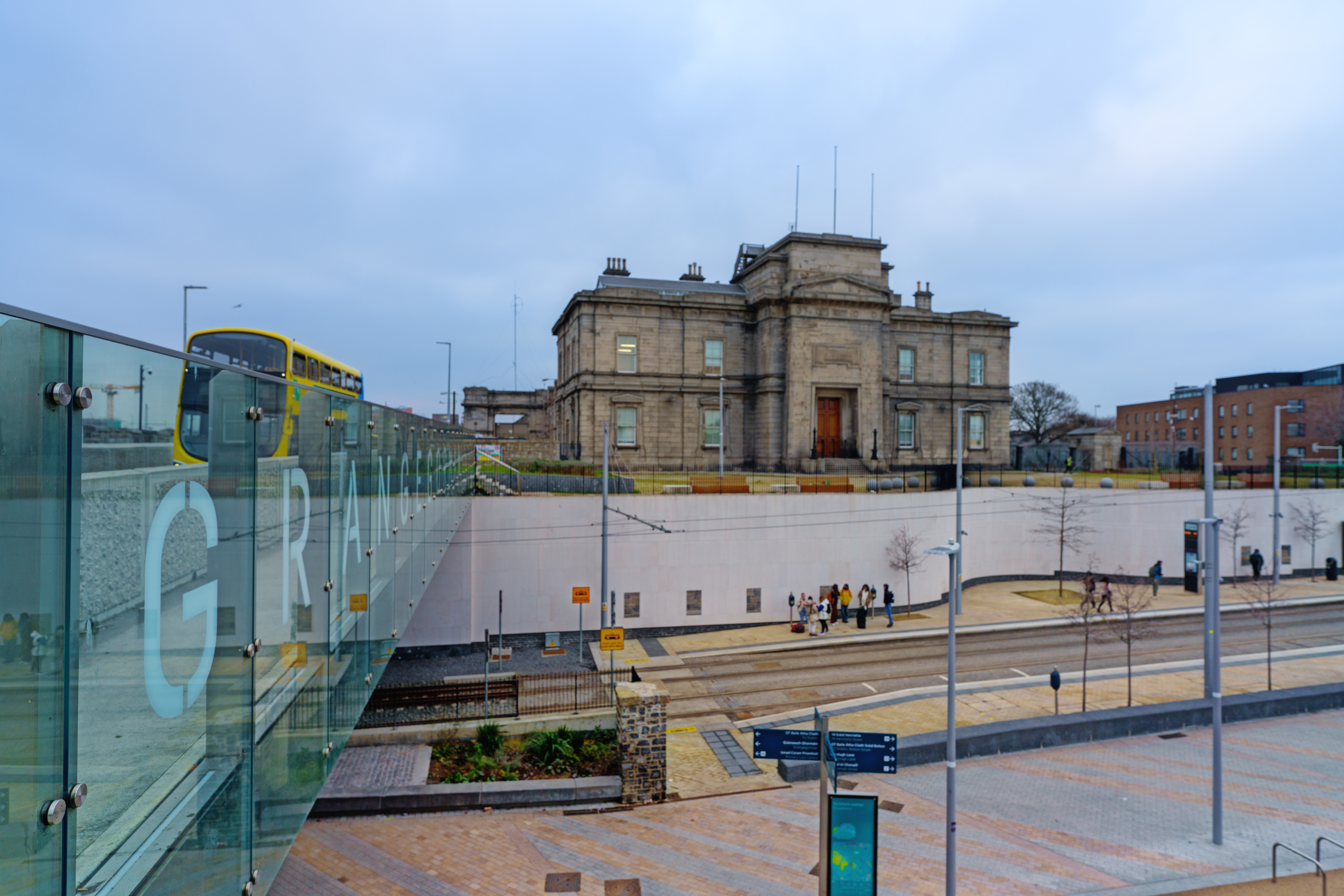
- Broadstone Station. The building was formerly a railway terminus in Broadstone, it now functions as a bus depot for Dublin Bus
- Interactive map of Broadstone
- Country: Ireland
- Province: Leinster
- City: Dublin
- Local authority: Dublin City Council
- Dáil Éireann constituency: Dublin Central
- European Parliament constituency: Dublin
- Elevation: 13 m (43 ft)

Broadstone (Irish: An Clochán Leathan) is one of the three neighbourhoods that make up present-day Phibsborough in Dublin, Ireland. The most southerly of these, it begins just two kilometres north of Father Mathew Bridge at Ormond Quay. The area is triangular, bounded by Phibsborough Road and Constitution Hill to the West, North Circular Road to the north, and Dorset Street and Bolton Street to the south-east. The postal district for the area is Dublin 7.

== Overview ==
Broadstone was known in earlier times as Glasmanogue. The name is descriptive of a ford crossing place over the Bradogue River, a Liffey tributary which passes through, and was historically forded in, the area. The Bradogue rises in Cabra to the north-west and runs to the Liffey at Ormond Quay. It has long been culverted and now runs wholly underground.

Broadstone Station, a former railway terminus, is located opposite the King's Inns at Constitution Hill. Broadstone does not have a village centre or main street. The Rail Terminus was the focal point of the neighbourhood and Broadstone's importance was derived came from its location as one of Dublin's then six railway termini until its closure in 1961.

Among the landmarks in Broadstone are the Black Church, King's Inns, Blessington Street Basin, Berkeley Road Church, and Royal Canal Bank. Much of the area was originally part of the Grangegorman estate, the demesne, manor house and grounds of the Monck Minogue Stanley family.

The area consists of streets of small and mid-sized red-brick houses built after the development of the Great Western Railway a century after the building of early Georgian Dublin in neighbouring Mountjoy, prior to the Act of Union 1801. One notable aspect of Georgian architecture retained in these modest homes was the ornate doorways with half-circle fanlights.

== History ==
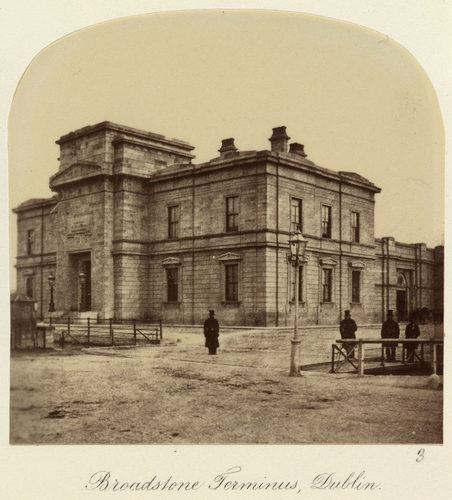
Broadstone terminus, Dublin c1875

=== Beginnings ===
Settled by Vikings, the area was part of the Manor of Grangegorman, which was famed for its vast orchards. The green was a common, used for pasture and pleasure. Late 18th-century pictures and reports describe a boggy wetland which became a quagmire in wet weather. The original Irish name of Glas Mochanog, anglicised to Glasmanogue, translates as Monck (variant Minogue) Green. From the Restoration in 1660, the area was used for military parades and pageants to celebrate the Restoration of Charles II, but it was not until the late 18th century and the construction of the Royal Canal that the Broadstone, Mountjoy, and Phibsborough became part of the city. Around this time the northern part of the city became fashionable with the Anglo-Irish political and commercial establishment, who made up the ruling and commercial Ascendancy of the emergent semi-autonomous Kingdom of Ireland. Notable among these was the Gardiner family, Earls of Blessington and Viscounts Mountjoy, after which the second Phibsborough neighbourhood of Mountjoy developed.

=== The Royal Canal ===
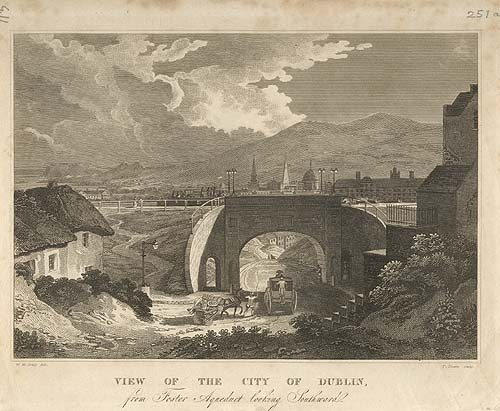
The view south from Foster Aqueduct circa 1827

In 1789, Dublin Corporation commissioned the Royal Canal and a harbour built on Constitution Hill, connected to the main canal at Phibsborough by a spur. In many ways, the history of Broadstone is the history of this canal. Though the branch line was completed by 1796, it was ten more years before the harbour was opened; construction continued for some years afterwards. The harbour's location was chosen for its proximity to the markets and the law courts.

By 1807 a regular passage boat service was operating to Mullingar. In subsequent years industry developed in the area, with many hotels and inns and trade boats using the wharfage and stores at the harbour. The canal was linked eventually with the River Shannon in 1817 after many financial difficulties and the majority of the main route still exists. In 1810 a reservoir, the Blessington Street Basin, was dug from the spur to supply water to the locality.

The average annual tonnage on the canal in the 1830s was 80,000 tons and 40,000 passengers.

=== The King's Inns ===
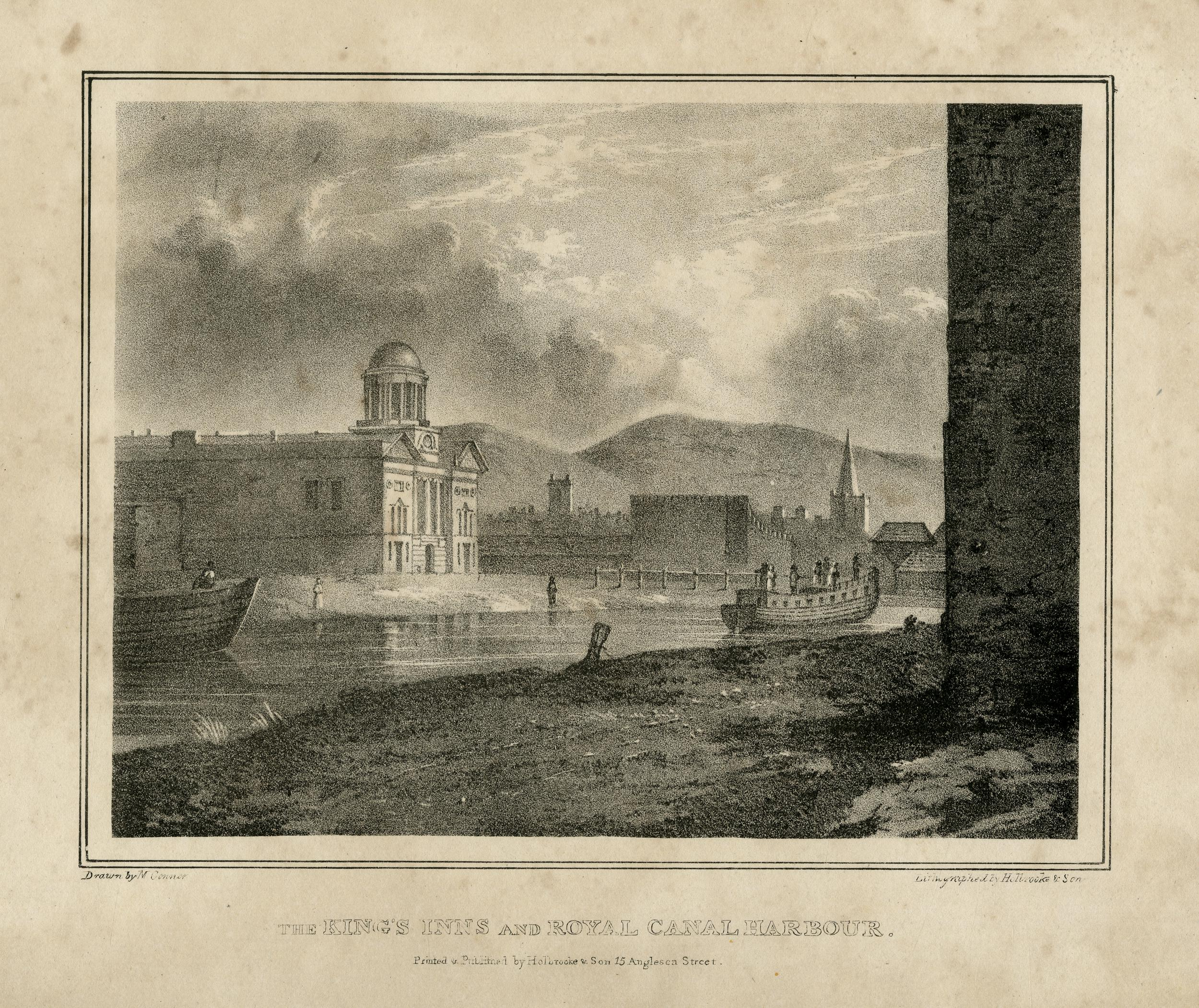
View of the King's Inns from across the Royal Canal Harbour c.1825-30

The King's Inns is the oldest institution of legal education in Ireland, founded in 1542 during the reign of Henry VIII, and originally occupied property where the Four Courts now stand. When the Four Courts were built in the 1790s, King's Inns moved to Constitution Hill. The present building, designed by James Gandon, was built opposite the harbour and, like Gandon's Four Courts and the Custom House, was designed with its frontage on a waterfront. Construction began in 1800 and was completed in 1823. Notable graduates since the move to Broadstone include Edward Carson, Patrick Pearse, Charles Haughey, Mary Robinson and Michael McDowell.

=== The Black Church ===
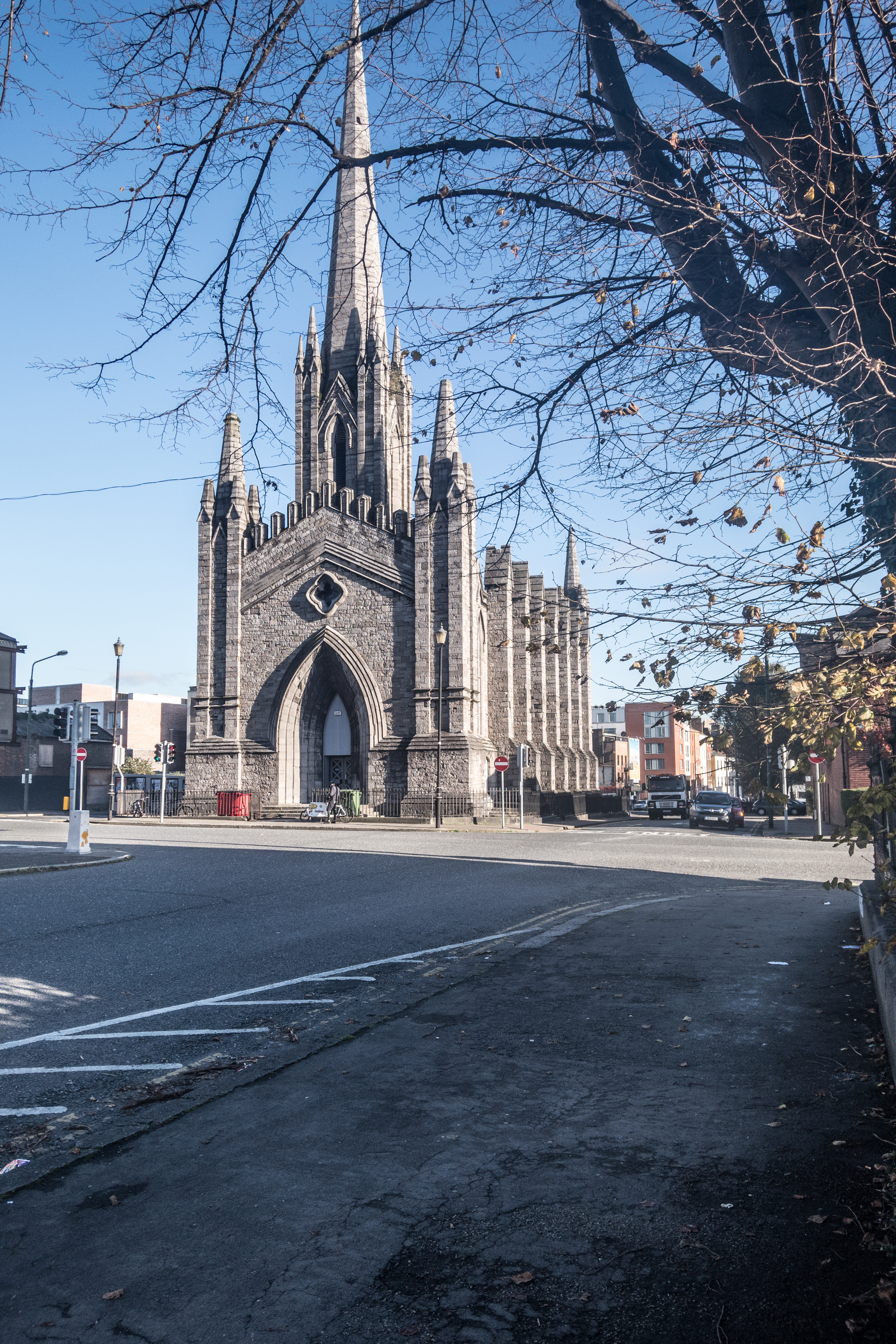
The Black Church, Broadstone

St. Mary's Chapel of Ease, universally known as the Black Church, was built in 1830 and was designed by John Semple. The nickname is thought to have originated due to the gloom of the interior, rather than the dark-grey colour of the exterior - the building has very thick walls and narrow windows. An interesting feature of the church is that it has no distinct walls or ceilings inside, the interior consisting entirely of a parabolic arch. The church interior has been totally refurbished and is now a suite of offices.

=== Midland Great Western Railway and Broadstone Station ===
In 1845 the Royal Canal was purchased by the Midland Great Western Railway Company for £298,059 with a view to using the land alongside the canal to construct a railway line to the west of Ireland. Broadstone railway station was completed in 1850. The building was one of Dublin's six original rail termini, the others being Westland Row (Pearse Station) Amiens Street (Connolly Station), Kingsbridge (Heuston Station), North Wall and Harcourt Street (now a bar and nightclub complex).

Situated at the crest of Constitution Hill directly opposite King's Inns, the station served as the terminus of the Midland Great Western Railway. Designed by John Skipton Mulvany, Broadstone Station is constructed of granite in a neo-Egyptian style.

With Galway projected to become the main port for transatlantic passenger traffic between Europe and North America, the Midland successfully competed with its rival the Great Southern and Western Railway to reach it first. A special fourth class was introduced by the Midland for poor migrants from the West going to Britain for work. The line, which branched out to serve Sligo, Westport, Achill and Clifden, was also used to transport huge numbers of cattle.

It was about this time that the majority of the houses in the area were constructed, as dwellings for workers on the railway. Most of the worker's houses were built by the Dublin Artisans' Dwellings Company, which built many similar estates in Dublin and elsewhere, and houses of this type are now frequently described as "Artisan" cottages, regardless of their origin.

=== Decline of the canal ===
The Great Irish Famine of the mid-19th century caused a huge wave of emigration, and the population of Ireland was reduced from about 8 million in the 1830s to around 4 million a century later. The worst hit were the rural population of the west, precisely the market of the MGWR. There was a brief period of boom in the 1870s as the flow of people from the west peaked, but as the people left, traffic in the other direction reduced markedly. As emigration gradually came to a halt, so did the canal system.

The MGWR was never very interested in the canal business and in 1877 they were given permission by the government to close 150 yards (140 m) of the branch line and to fill in the harbour, to construct a new forecourt for the station. That removed the need for a movable pontoon bridge, and a new approach road, Western Way, was built by way of Foster Aqueduct. The harbour was no longer needed due to the construction of one larger and better situated at Spencer Dock, and was filled in to become the forecourt of Broadstone Station.

The small reservoir had been made almost redundant by the construction of a new reservoir at Vartry in 1868, and served only the Jameson Whiskey distilleries at Smithfield, until they left the city in the 1970s.

By the 1920s average annual tonnage on the Royal Canal had reduced to 10,000 tons. In 1924 the MGWR amalgamated with its rival, the Great Southern and Western Railway, to enable rationalisation and survival, and in 1927 the bridged section under Foster aqueduct was filled in, and the canal and railway were permanently disconnected.

=== Decline of the railway ===
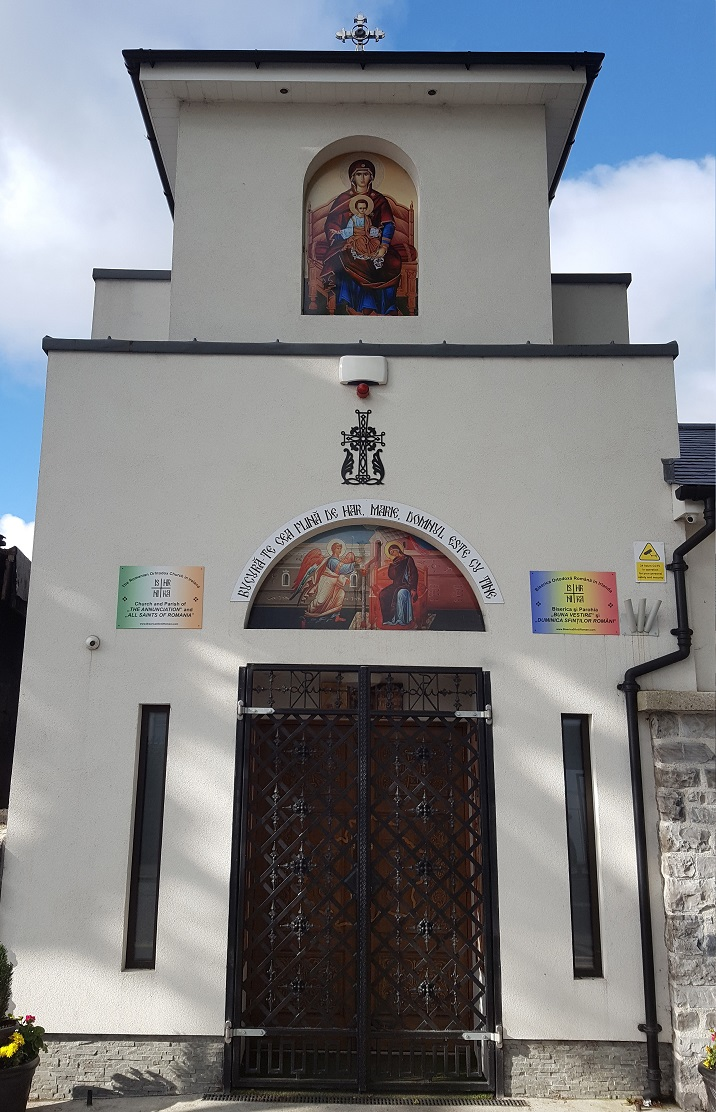
Romanian Orthodox Church, on Western Way

By the 1930s the railway was in decline and the last train arrived from Westport in 1937. In 1944 the Canal and Railway both passed into the ownership of the state transport company Córas Iompair Éireann (CIÉ), which transferred all its steam locomotives there in 1954. However, when steam locomotion ended in 1961, Broadstone was closed.

Foster Aqueduct was removed in 1951 to facilitate road widening.

Today the historic building is used as offices by Bus Éireann and the rest of the site is used as a parking and servicing area for buses, with the main building mostly obscured from view from the street.

=== Modern times ===
After the closure of the railway came the hardships of the war, rationing, and a prolonged recession. Unemployment and deprivation hit the inhabitants of Dublin's north inner city hard, and the area around Dominick Street, Grangegorman and Broadstone was one of the worst affected by drug abuse, especially heroin. The park at Royal Canal Bank and Blessington Street Basin became notable for antisocial behaviour/

== Access and transport ==
The Luas Green Line serves the area and the Technological University Dublin central campus in Grangegorman, with two Luas stops, called Broadstone - University and Grangegorman, and opened in 2017. This connects Broadstone Plaza from Constitution Hill to Grangegorman. The Luas continues northwards to Broombridge railway station along the old Broadstone Railway line and south to Phibsborough and Dublin city centre.

== See also ==
- List of towns and villages in Ireland
- Rail transport in Ireland
