= Liffey Junction railway station =

Railway station in Cabra, Ireland

Liffey Junction Gabhal na Lífe
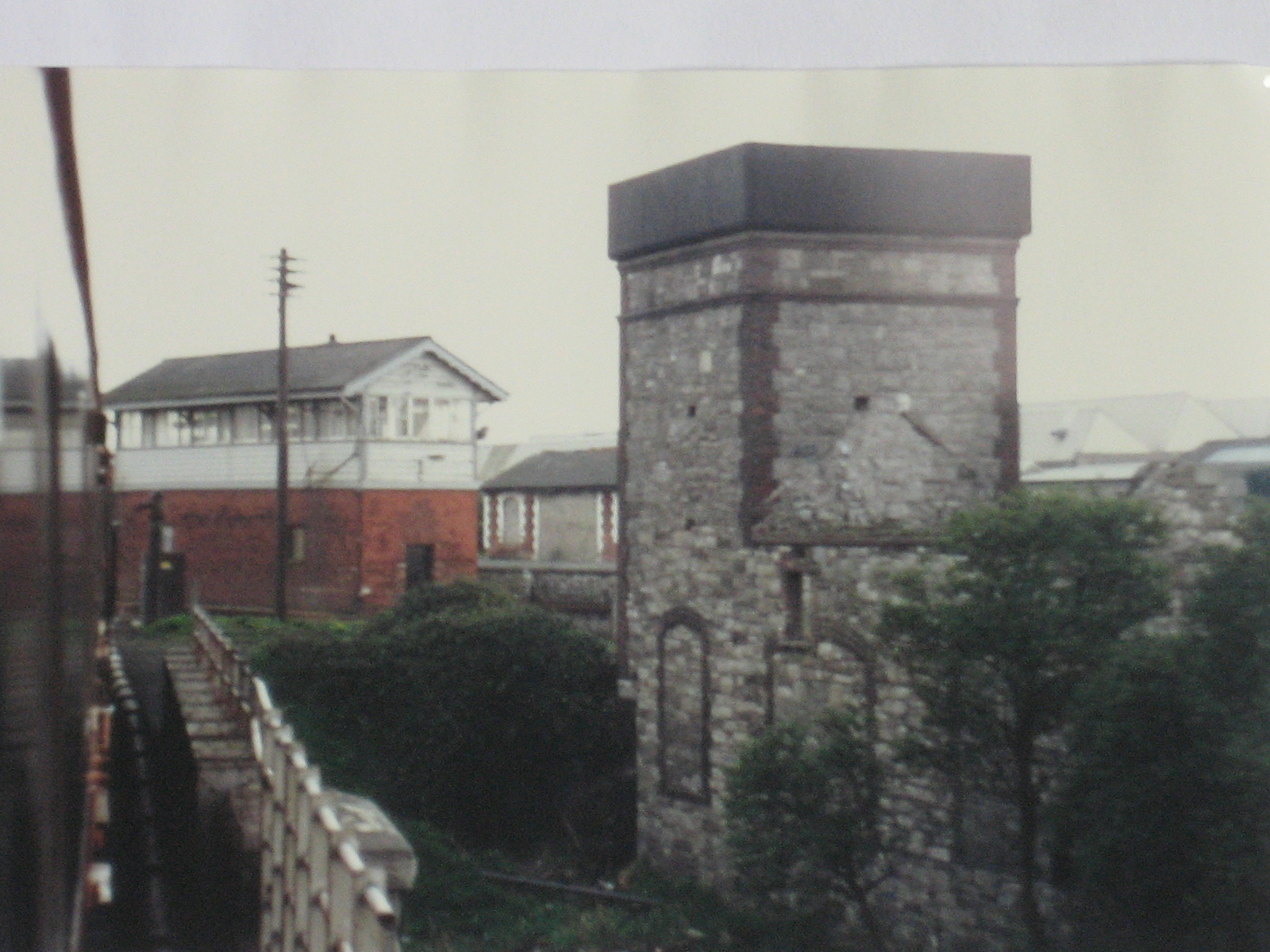
- Liffey Junction signal box and watertower

General information
- Location: Cabra; Ireland
- Coordinates: 53.371712°N 6.295755°W
- Platforms: 7

Construction
- Structure type: At-grade

History
- Original company: Midland Great Western Railway
- Pre-grouping: Midland Great Western Railway
- Post-grouping: Great Southern Railways

Key dates
- 1864: Station opened
- 18 January 1937: Station closed to passenger services
- 1977: Station closed to freight services
- 1997: Station demolished
- 9 December 2017: Luas services commence
Location

Liffey Junction is a former railway station and junction on the former Midland Great Western Railway (MGWR) in Dublin, Ireland.

== History ==
The station opened in 1864 upon the opening of the Liffey Line from this point to the River Liffey at North Wall. The station closed to passenger traffic on 18 January 1937 upon the concurrent closure of the line from Broadstone to Liffey Junction, such traffic being rerouted to Pearse Station (then Westland Row). The station remained in use until 1977 for cattle traffic and afterwards was used as a wagon storage point.

Today, most of the features of this station have disappeared. Those that remain include the water tower between the trackbed of the mainline and the Liffey Line branch (now part of the Dublin–Sligo line) fronting onto the Royal Canal, traces of the upside island platform and a water column.

There was a carriage shed located between the Liffey Line and the Royal Canal. This area remains distinguishable today as a triangular-shaped area on the northeastern side of the Liffey Line bridge over the Royal Canal. The MGWR's creosoting plant was also located here.

By 2017, tracks had been laid and overhead wires installed along the former alignment to Dublin Broadstone in preparation for the Luas Cross City services, which commenced on 9 December 2017. A new Luas depot was built on the site of the former Liffey Junction station. The downside loading bank was demolished in early 2016.

| Preceding station | Disused railways | Following station |
|---|---|---|
| Dublin Broadstone; Line and station closed | Midland Great Western Railway; Dublin–Galway/Sligo | Ashtown; Line and station open |
