= Dublin Broadstone railway station =

Former rail terminal in Dublin, Ireland

Dublin Broadstone Baile Átha Cliath Stáisiún An Clocháin Leathan
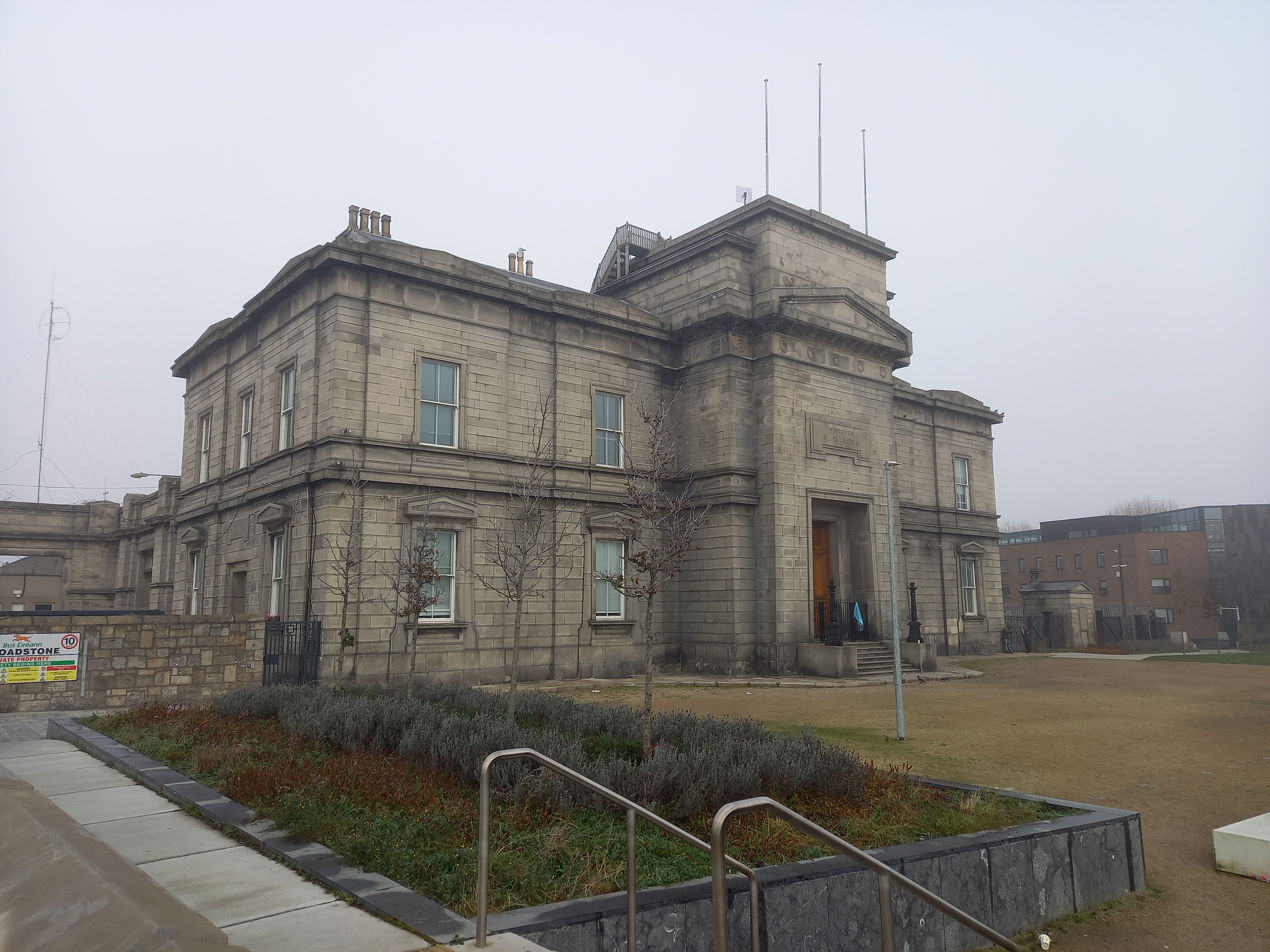
- The facade of Broadstone station

General information
- Location: Phibsborough Road, Broadstone; Dublin 7, D07 X2AE
- Coordinates: 53.354291°N 6.273816°W
- Owner: CIÉ; Transport Infrastructure Ireland
- Operator: Transdev (as Luas); Bus Éireann
- Platforms: 2
- Tracks: 6
- Bus routes: 6
- Bus operators: Bus Éireann; Dublin Bus
- Connections: 23; 24; 103; E1; E2; NX

Construction
- Structure type: At-grade
- Architect: John Skipton Mulvany

History
- Original company: Midland Great Western Railway
- Pre-grouping: Midland Great Western Railway
- Post-grouping: Great Southern Railways

Key dates
- June 1847: Station opened
- 18 January 1937: Station closed to passenger services
- 8 April 1961: Station closed
- 9 December 2017: Luas services commence
Services
Preceding station	Luas	Following station
Dominick	Green Line	Grangegorman
	Disused railways	
Terminus	Midland Great Western Railway; Dublin-Galway/Sligo	Liffey Junction; Line open, station closed
Location
- Location within Central Dublin

Broadstone railway station (Irish: Stáisiún An Clocháin Leathan) was the Dublin terminus of the Midland Great Western Railway (MGWR), located in the Dublin suburb of Broadstone. The site also contained the MGWR railway works and a steam locomotive motive power depot. A Luas tram stop opened at the front of the station in 2017.

It is currently the headquarters of Bus Éireann, housing most of their administration and one of their main garages. Nearby on the same property is a Dublin Bus Depot.

== History ==
=== Etymology ===
Broadstone Station

The name derives from the Norse "Bradogue Steyn" or "Broad Stone", due to the Bradogue River crossing the road to Finglas at this location. "Bradogue" itself means "Young Salmon" in Irish.

=== Beginnings ===
In 1845, the Royal Canal was purchased by the Midland Great Western Railway Company (MGWR) with a view to using the land alongside the canal to construct a railway line to the west of Ireland. The line was constructed in stages and by 1848 reached Mullingar. Similarly, Broadstone station was worked in tandem with opening in 1847 and final completion 1850. The MGWR developed locomotive and carriage works around the station.

Designed by John Skipton Mulvany, the structure was built between 1841 and 1850, and the colonnade was added in 1861. Broadstone Station is constructed of granite in a neo-Egyptian style. Regarding the architectural merits of the station, historian Maurice Craig described it as "the last building in Dublin to partake of the sublime... Its lonely grandeur is emphasised now by its disuse as a terminus, and the melancholy quarter of high-and-dry hotels close beside it. It stands on rising ground, and the traveller who sees it for the first time, so unexpected in its massive amplitude, feels a little as he might if he were to stumble unawares upon the monstrous silences of Karnak or Luxor".

During the construction of the permanent roof in the late 1840s it was damaged by a severe gale but complete disaster was averted by the earlier timber structure over which it was being built. The 475 feet (145 m) by 120 feet (37 m) two span roof is said to have been basis of the design for the larger span at Liverpool Lime Street. With the construction of the colonnade in 1861, trains arrived to the east side platform and passengers exited through the colonnade. Trains departed from the west side platform where there was a booking office and waiting rooms. The four middle tracks were used to stable rolling stock in the interim. The building at front of the station was used as the headquarters building for the MGWR and did not contain a passenger entrance.

With Galway projected to become the main port for transatlantic passenger traffic between Europe and North America, the MGWR successfully competed with its rival the Great Southern and Western Railway to reach it first in August 1851. A special fourth class was introduced by the MGWR for poor migrants from the west going to Britain for work. The line, which branched out to serve Athboy, Kingscourt, Cavan, Sligo, Ballina, Westport, Achill and Clifden, was also used to transport large numbers of cattle.

It was about this time that the majority of the houses in the area were constructed as dwellings for workers on the railway. Most of the houses were built by the Artisan's Dwelling Company, which built many similar estates in Dublin and elsewhere, and houses of this type are now frequently described as Artisan cottages, regardless of their origin.

In 1856, Broadstone Garage was the site of the murder of station clerk George Little. His body was discovered in his locked office on Friday 14 November 1856, when he didn't check in for work.

Joseph Howley, a member of the Irish Volunteers in Galway, was shot dead by a special unit of the RIC known as the Igoe Gang at the station on 4 December 1920 during the Irish War of Independence.

=== Closure ===
The station was closed to public traffic on 18 January 1937 with MGWR services redirected to the more central Westland Row. While the old MGWR main line was able to access the Dublin loop line to Amiens Street via the North Liffey line Newcomen Bridge junction, this was not available to heavier engines such as the Woolwich Moguls due to weight restrictions over the lifting bridge over the Royal Canal. The alternative route via the Drumcondra link line would have required reversals to the Glasnevin and Drumcondra junctions so the connecting line was also remodeled at the same time to allow direct through running.

After closure to passengers, the complex was used as a steam depot for Dublin, and then fully closed in 1961.

This building was one of Dublin's six original rail termini, the others being Westland Row (now Pearse Station) Amiens Street (now Connolly Station), Kingsbridge (now Heuston Station), North Wall and Harcourt Street (now a bar and nightclub complex).

== Location ==
Situated at the crest of Constitution Hill directly opposite King's Inns, the station served as the finishing point of the Midland and Great Western Railway.

== Failed proposal re-use for heavy rail ==
In April 2007 Iarnród Éireann announced that Broadstone Station was to be reopened for rail passenger use by 2010. However, by this time, the Railway Procurement Agency had drawn up plans to use the alignment for a Luas extension. This gave rise to a dispute between CIE/Irish Rail and the RPA over the use of the trackbed between Broadstone and Liffey Junction. On 5 February 2008 Noel Dempsey, the Minister for Transport, indicated his preference for the Luas project over the re-opening of Broadstone for heavy rail, asking CIÉ to seek permanent planning permission to build and use Docklands Station for the purposes CIÉ intended for Broadstone Station.

== Broadstone - University Luas stop ==
Broadstone - University An Chloch Leathan - Ollscoil
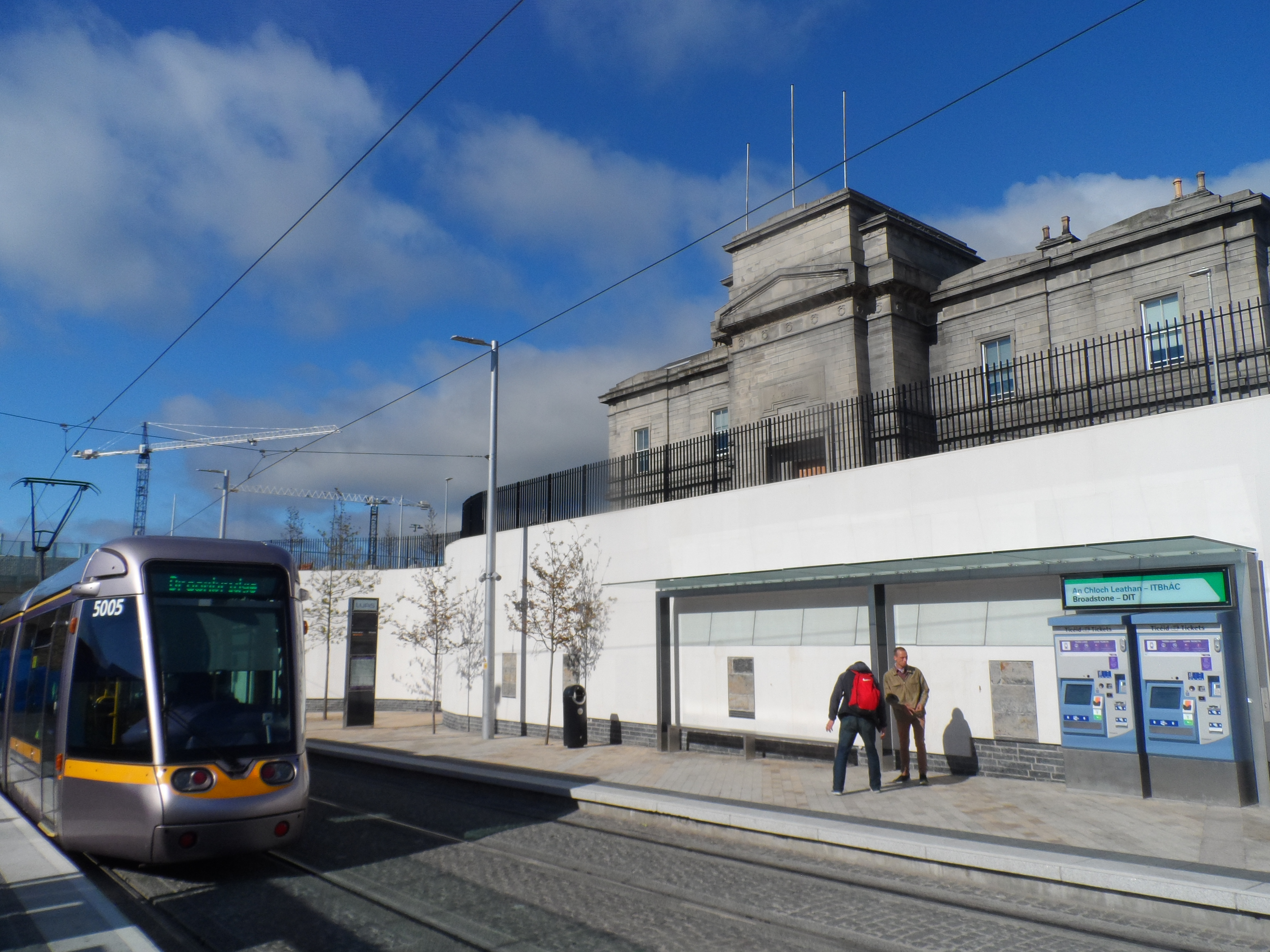
- Broadstone - University Luas Stop

General information
- Location: Phibsborough Road, Broadstone; Dublin 7, D07 X2AE; Ireland
- Owner: Transport Infrastructure Ireland
- Operator: Luas
- Line: Green
- Platforms: 2

Construction
- Structure type: At-grade

Key dates
- 9 December 2017: Stop opened as Broadstone - DIT
- 2024: Renamed Broadstone - University

Services
Preceding station	Luas	Following station
Grangegorman towards Broombridge	Green Line	Dominick towards Sandyford or Brides Glen
Location

In June 2013, Luas Cross City - a construction project which extended the Luas Green Line North from St Stephen's Green station to Broombridge - commenced. The line, which opened to passengers on 9 December 2017, traverses the city centre on street-running track and arrives at Broadstone. It then enters into the Broadstone cutting where it continues on its own right of way.

Broadstone - University (DIT until 2024) is a Luas stop on the line. Its name refers to the fact that it was intended to be the closest stop to Dublin Institute of Technology Grangegorman campus. However, the plans were changed at a late stage, adding Grangegorman stop, which is closer to the campus. Construction of the stop involved excavating a large amount of earth from the land in front of the station, and building a road bridge over the tracks which buses can use to access the depot.

The stop was renamed in 2024 to "Broadstone - University" as a result of the renaming of the nearby university to Technological University Dublin.

=== Location and access ===
The Luas stop has two lateral platforms and is in front of the station building. It was built several metres below the station in order to make it level with Constitution Hill; and a curved, white wall separates the southbound platform from the garden in front of the building. Trams approach the stop from Dominick Street Upper and continues by passing under the new bridge and turning sharply to the right, where they traverse the edge of the bus depot and enter the cutting.

== Gallery ==
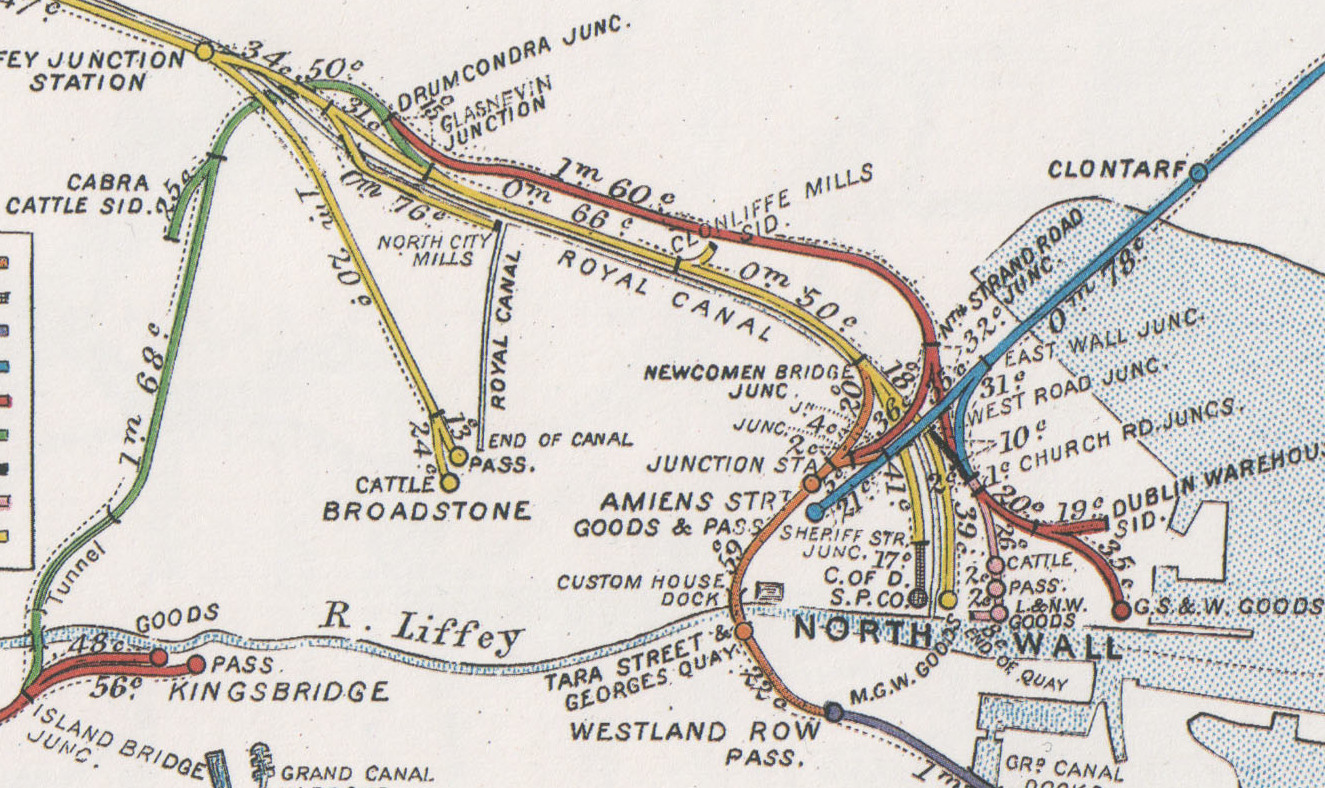
1912 map showing Broadstone and pre-1937 layout at Glasnevin

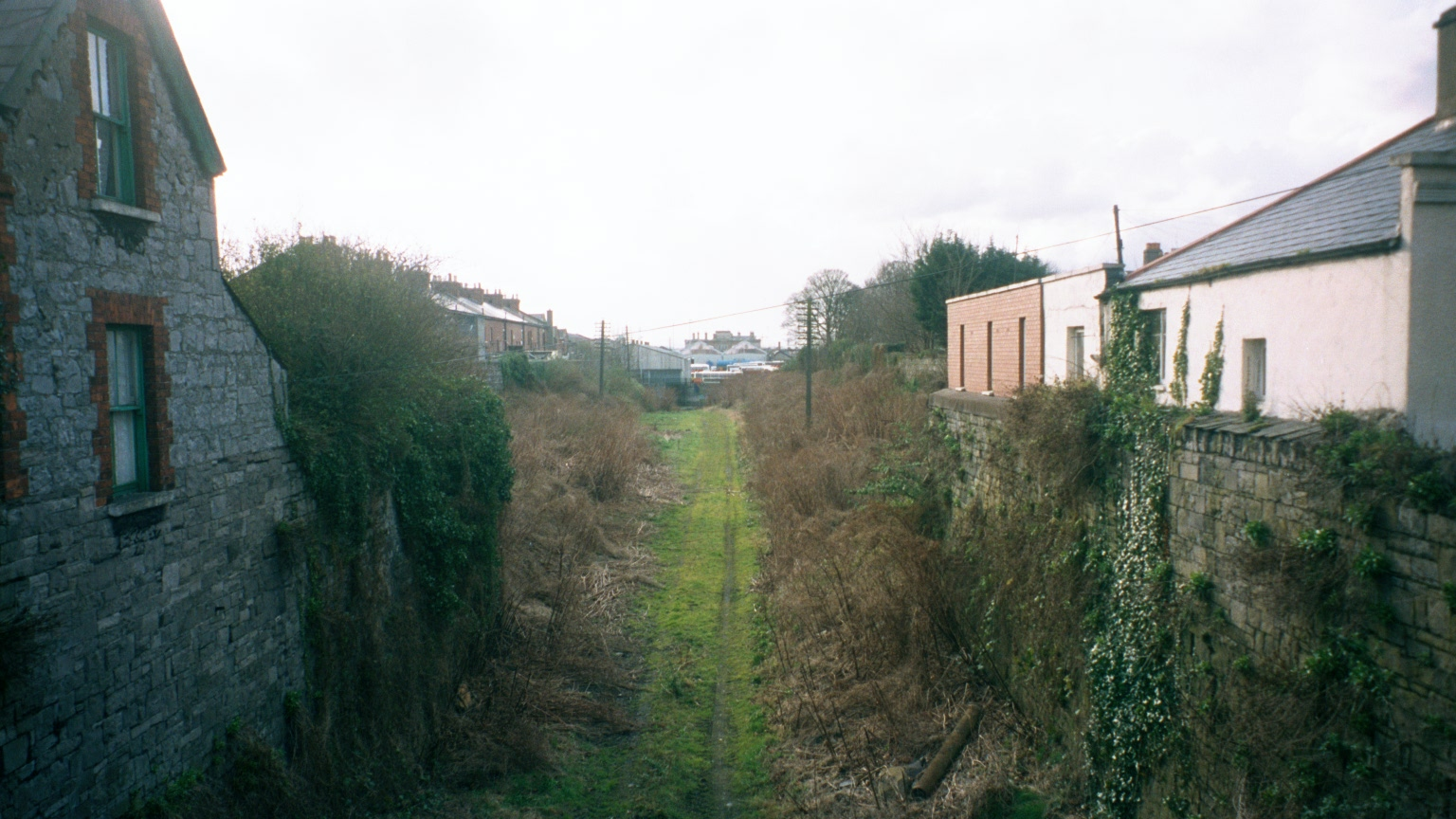
The view of the old railway line from the North Circular Road showing Broadstone in the distance, before the LUAS development

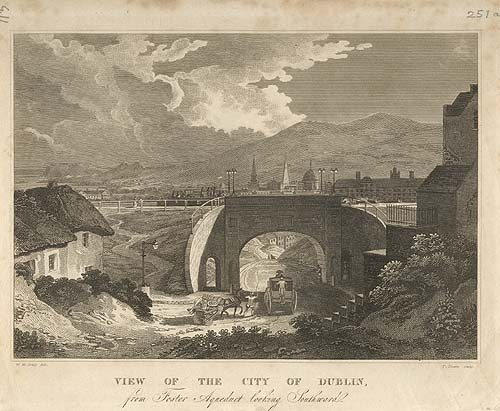
Foster aqueduct

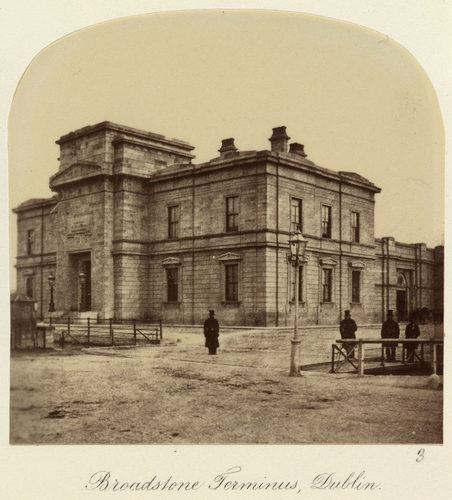
Broadstone terminus c1875

== See also ==
- Harcourt Street railway line
- Rail transport in Ireland
