= Grangegorman Luas stop =

Tram stop in Dublin, Ireland

Grangegorman Gráinseach Ghormáin
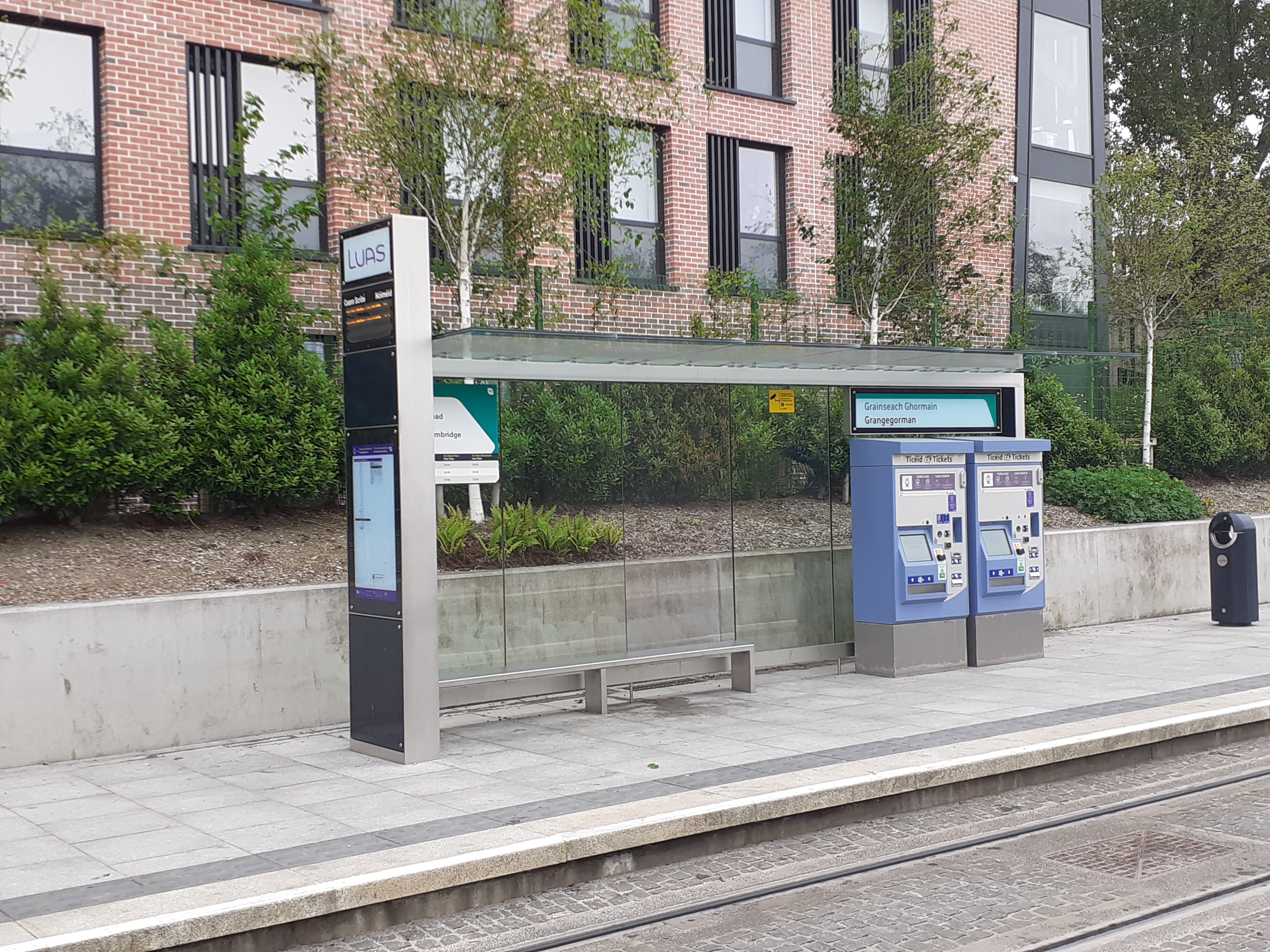

General information
- Location: Dublin; Ireland
- Coordinates: 53°21′26″N 6°16′38″W
- Owner: Transport Infrastructure Ireland
- Operator: Transdev (as Luas)
- Line: Green
- Platforms: 2

Construction
- Structure type: At-grade

Other information
- Fare zone: Green 1

Key dates
- 9 December 2017: Stop opened

Services
Preceding station	Luas	Following station
Phibsborough towards Broombridge	Green Line	Broadstone — University towards Sandyford or Brides Glen
Location
- Location within Central Dublin

Grangegorman (Irish: Gráinseach Ghormáin) is a stop on the Luas light-rail tram system in Dublin, Ireland. It opened in 2017 as a stop on Luas Cross City, an extension of the Green Line through the city centre from St. Stephen's Green to Broombridge.

== Location ==
The stop is located to the side of a Dublin Bus depot at Broadstone, and its sole entrance and exit is a pathway leading from Grangegorman to the southern end of the northbound platform. It has two edge platforms with walls at either side.

Grangegorman provides access to immediate access to the main campus of Technological University Dublin, and at some distance, the Mater Hospital. During the planning of Luas Cross City, it was envisaged that Grangegorman stop would not be built, but rather a provision for a future stop would be made at that site. Late in the development, it was decided to build the stop after all.
