= St. Joseph's Carmelite Church, Berkeley Road =

St. Joseph's Church
- St. Joseph's Carmelite Church, Berkeley Road
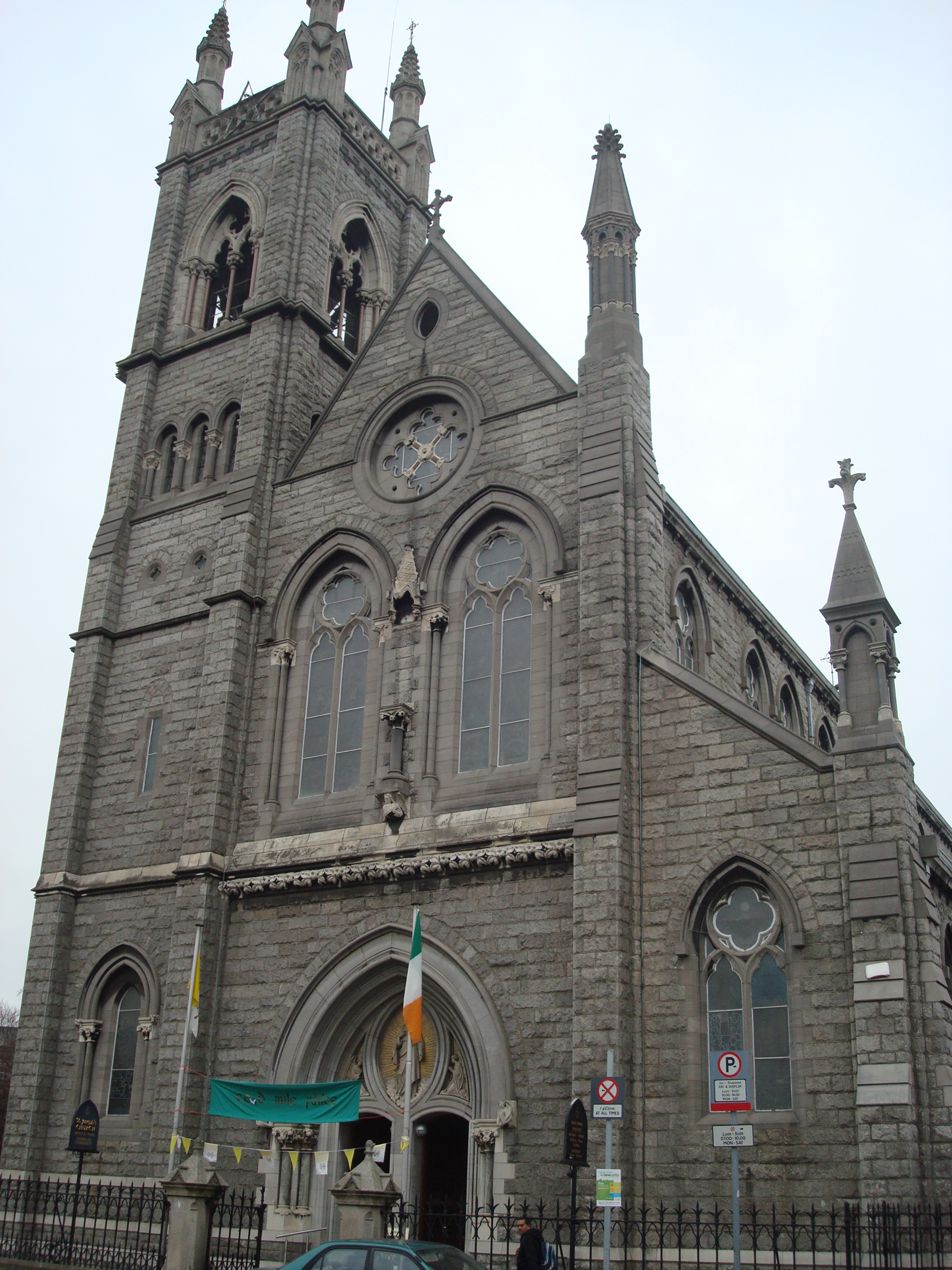
- St. Joseph's Church
- 53.358156°N 6.26854°W
- Location: Berkeley Street; Dublin
- Country: Ireland
- Denomination: Roman Catholic
- Website: Berkeley Road Parish

History
- Dedication: Saint Joseph
- Consecrated: 1880

Architecture
- Architect(s): O'Neill and Byrne
- Architectural type: Church
- Style: Gothic Revival

Administration
- Archdiocese: Dublin
- Deanery: North City Centre
- Parish: Berkeley Road Parish

St. Joseph's Carmelite Church on Berkeley Road, Dublin, Ireland is the Roman Catholic church of the Berkeley Road Parish. The church is dedicated to Saint Joseph and is in full use today in the care of the Discalced Carmelites.

== History ==
Originally a wooden chapel of ease was built here in 1870 until its replacement with the building of the current granite church.

The granite building was designed by the architects O'Neill and Byrne with construction beginning in 1875 and was completed and consecrated in 1880.

The Berkeley Road Parish was established in 1890 from St. Michan's. The parish is called Berkeley Road even though the church is located on Berkeley Street.

To celebrate the establishment of the parish, the North-Western bell tower was constructed between 1892–3 to the designs of John L. Robinson.

The church was put into the care of the Discalced Carmelites in July 1983.

== Inside ==
=== Stained Glass ===
The west end window of the Blessed Virgin aisle is by Hardman & Co.

=== Statues ===
The reredos with life size angels is by the Dublin artist Mary Redmond who is also noted for the statue of Fr Mathew on O'Connell Street.

== Gallery ==
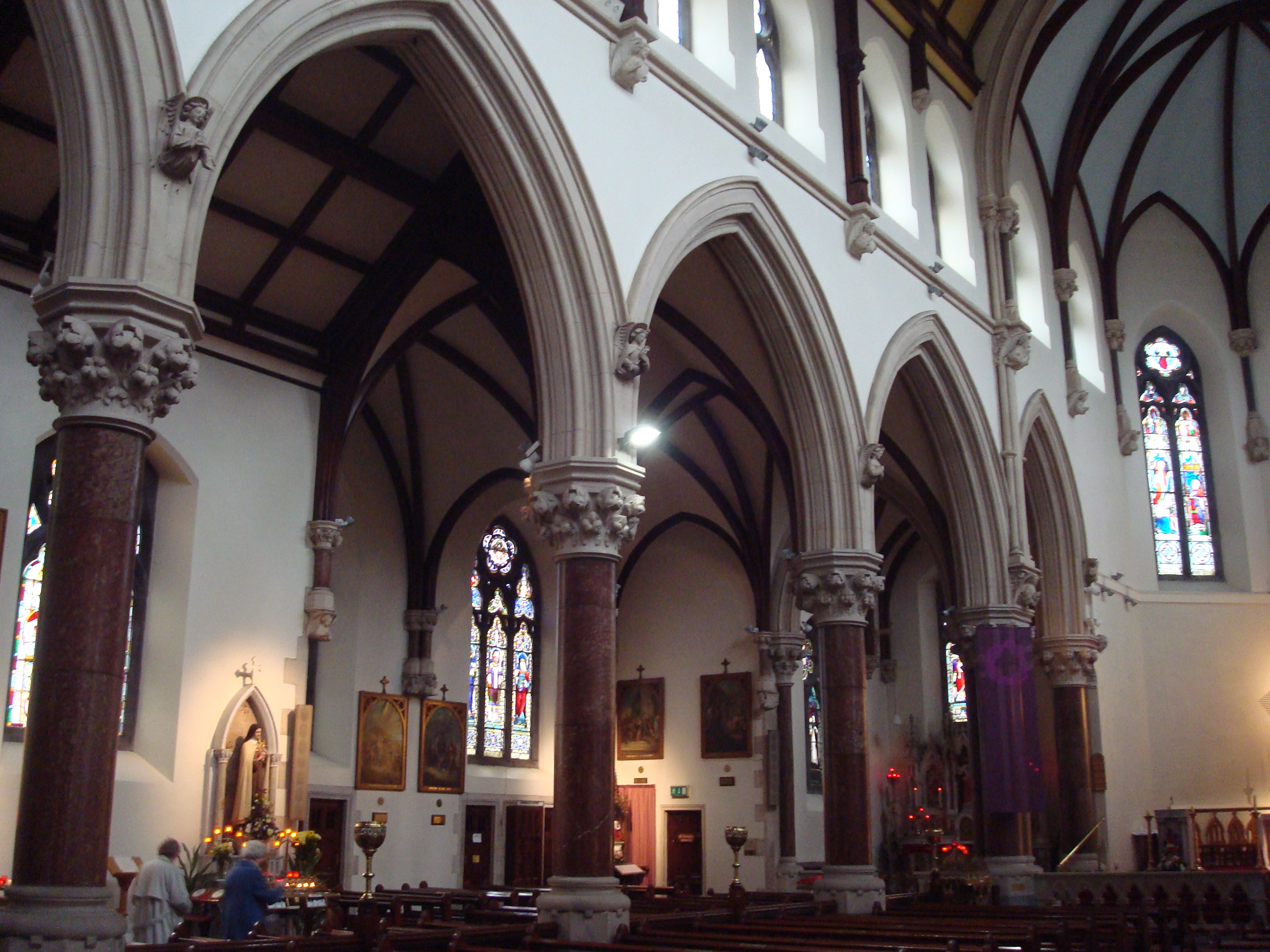
Inside left

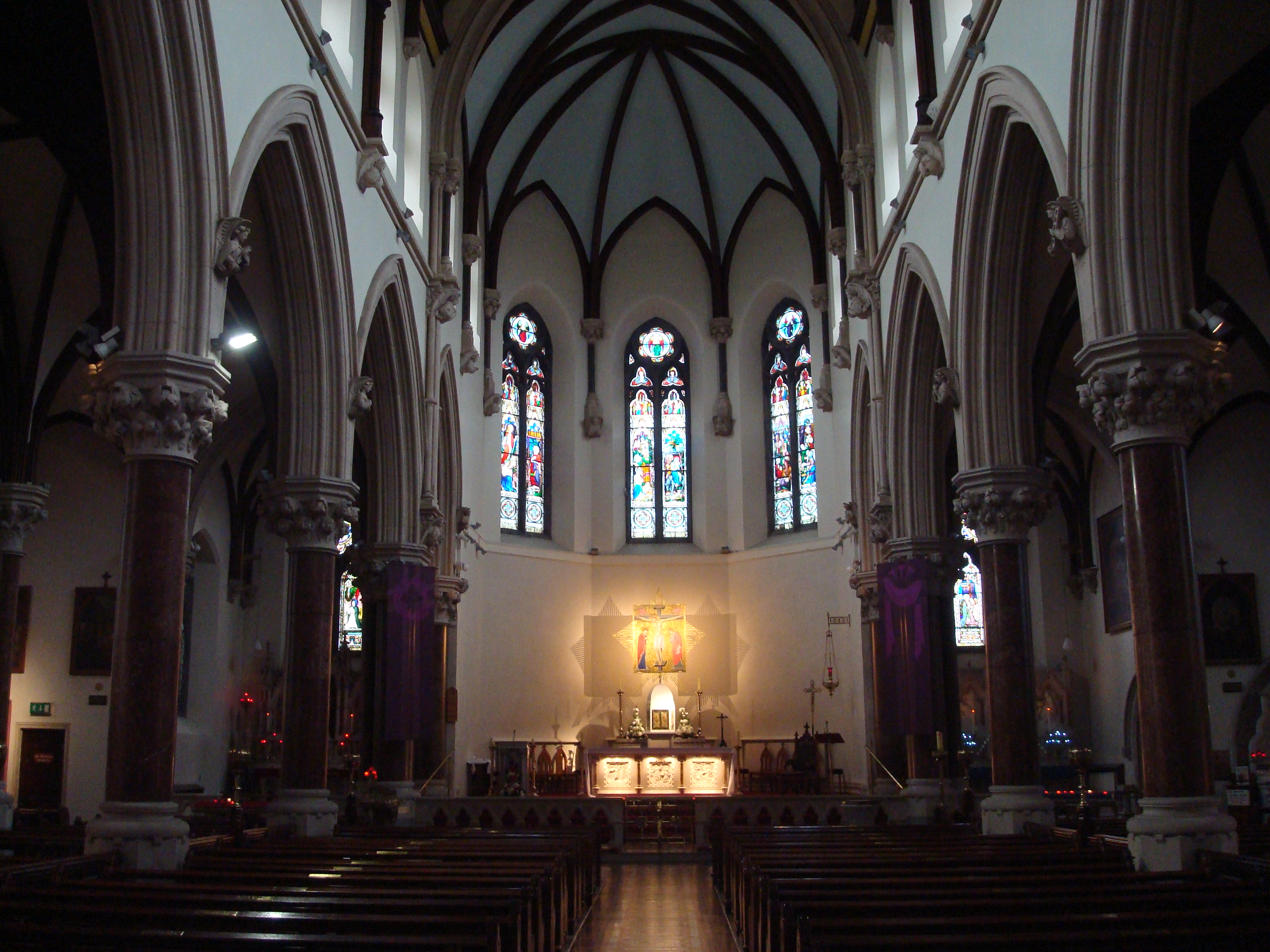
Inside view and the altar

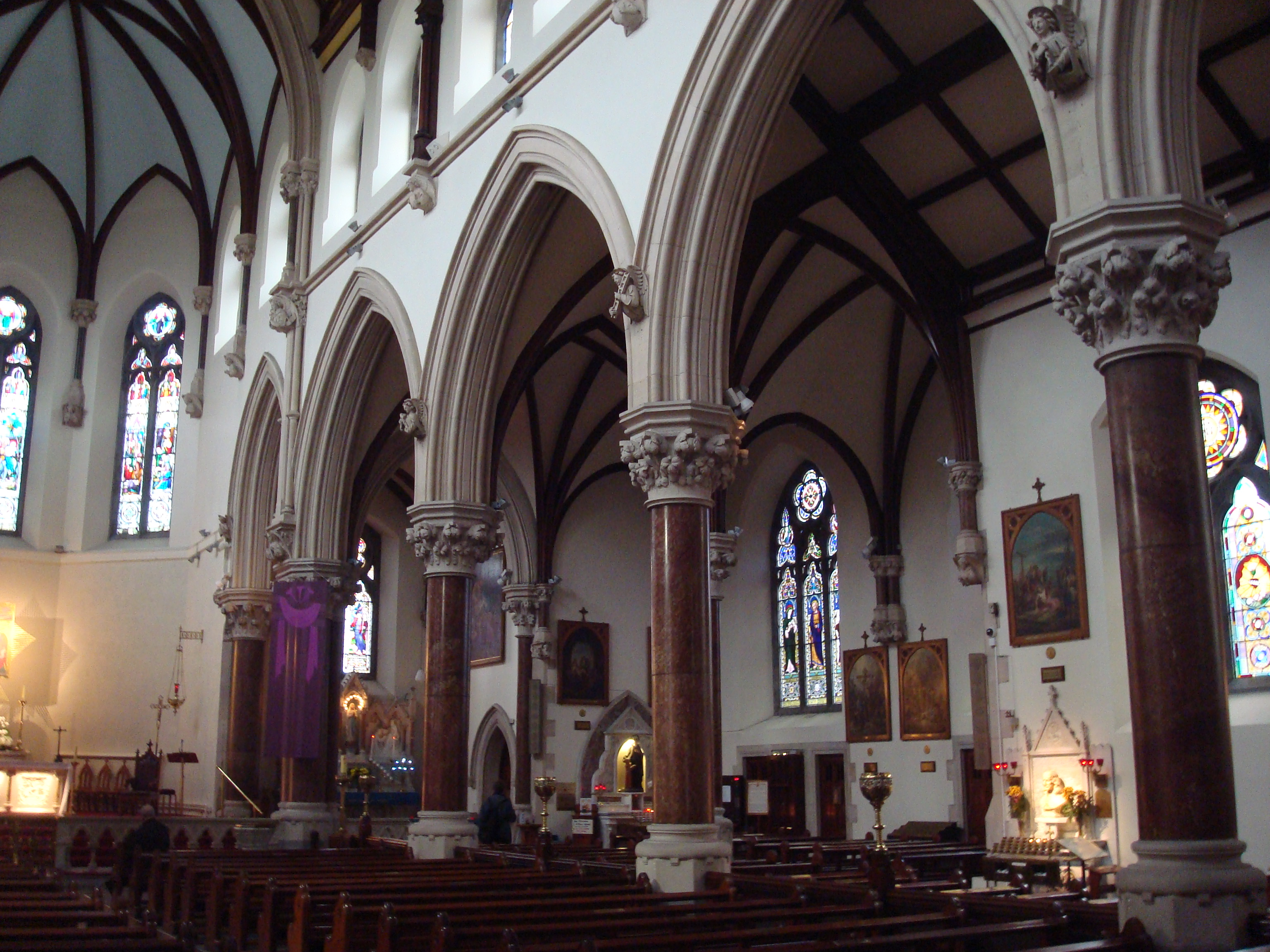
Inside right

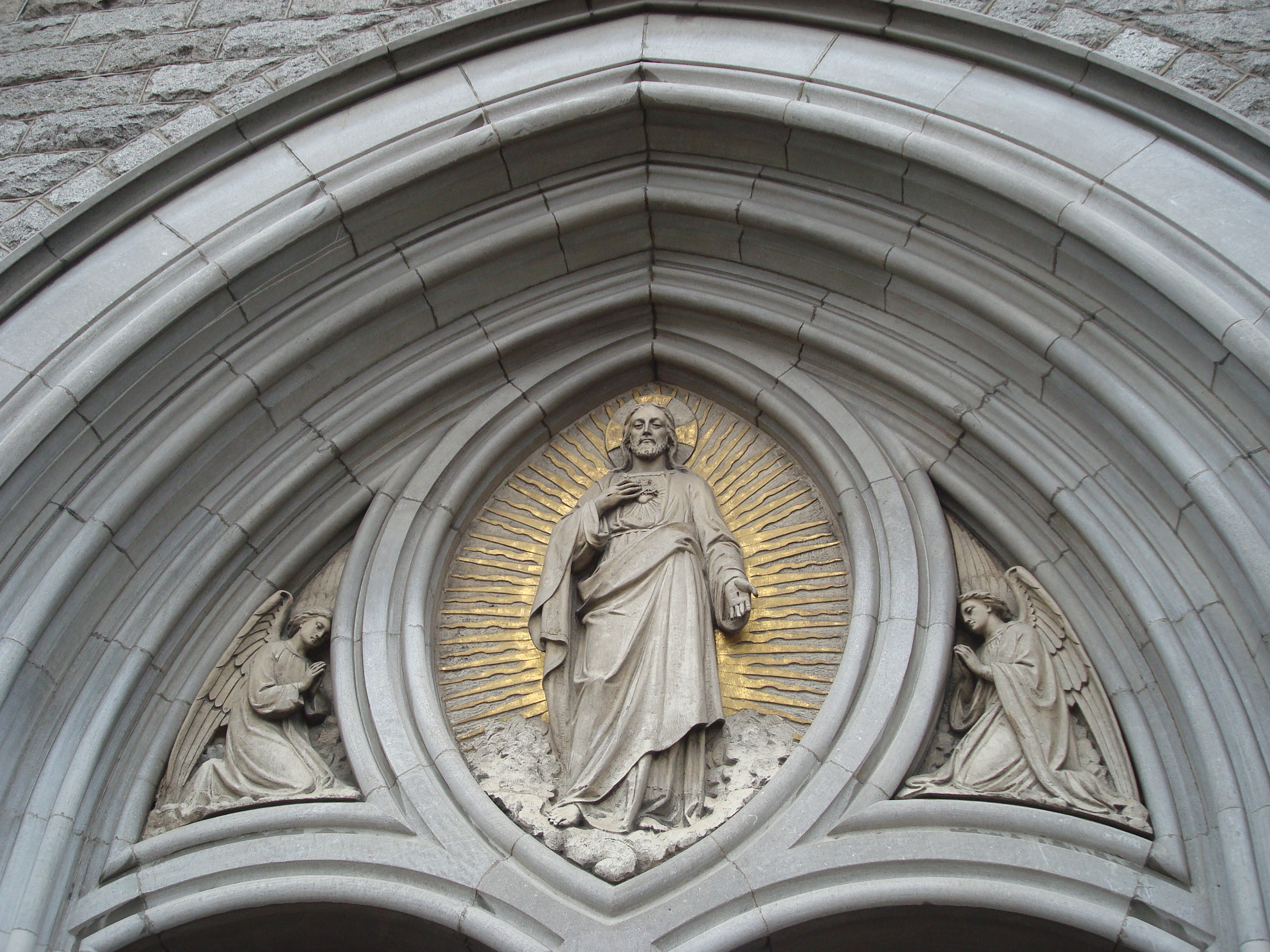
Statues above the main door

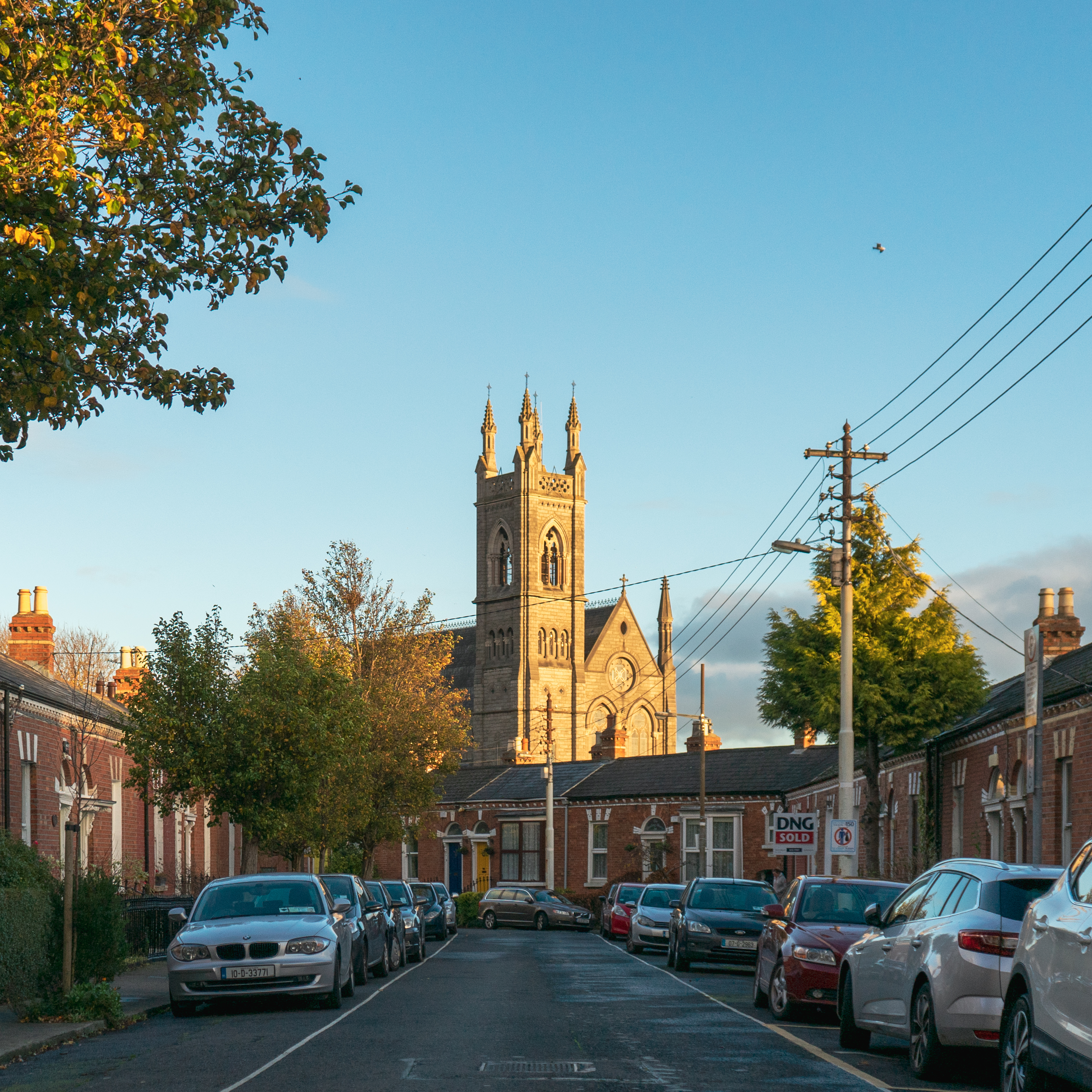
The church as seen from Geraldine Street

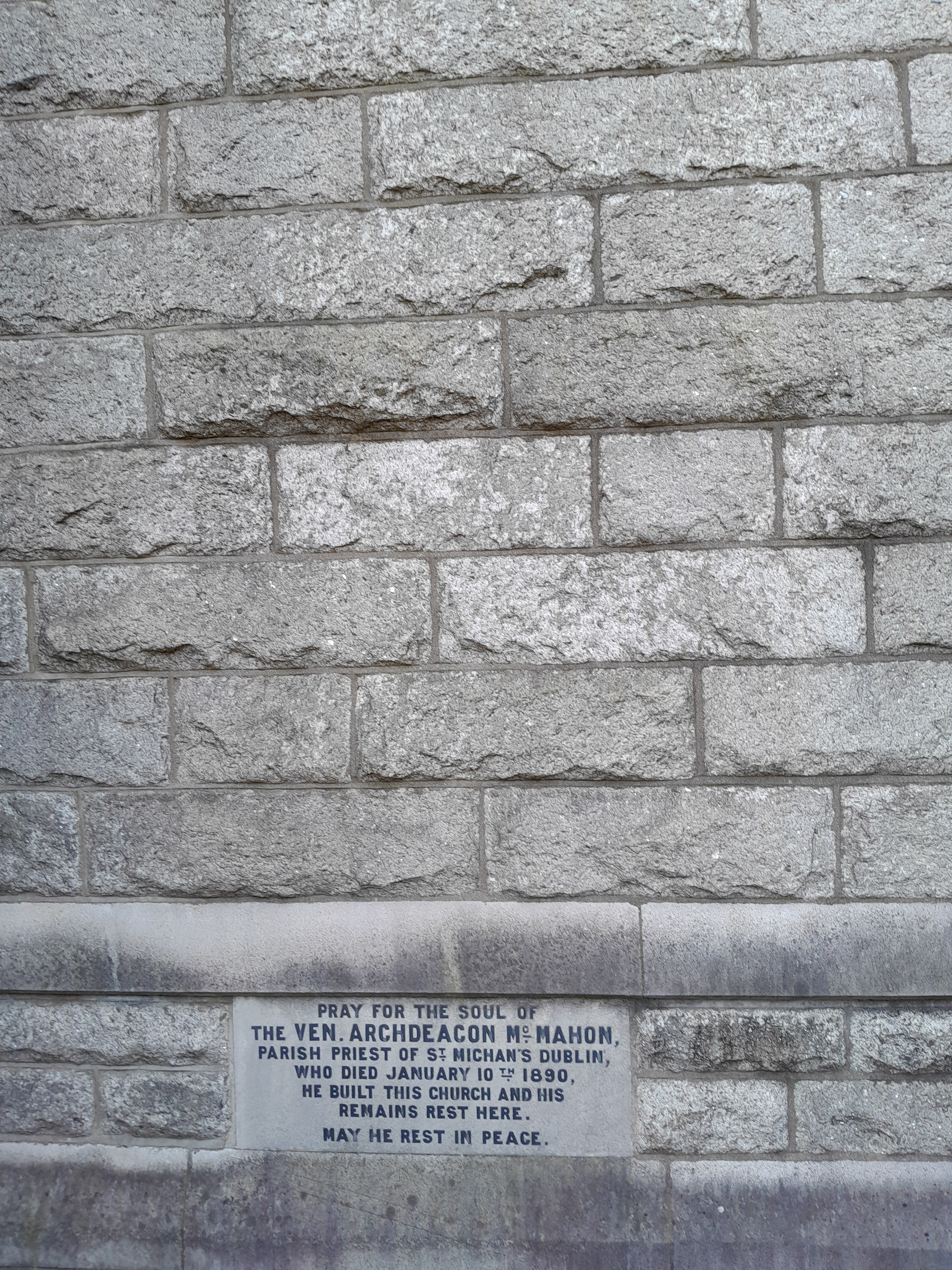

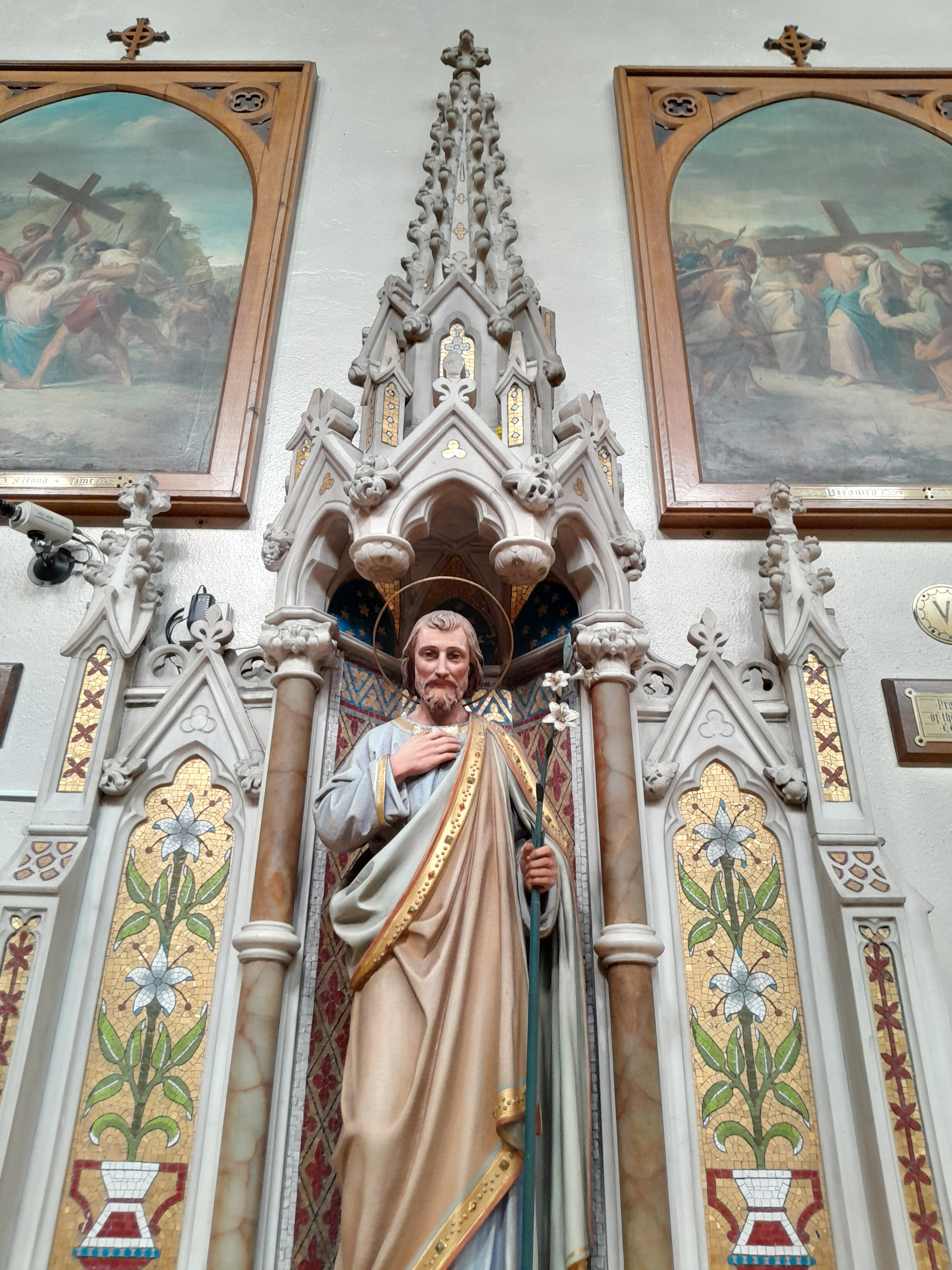

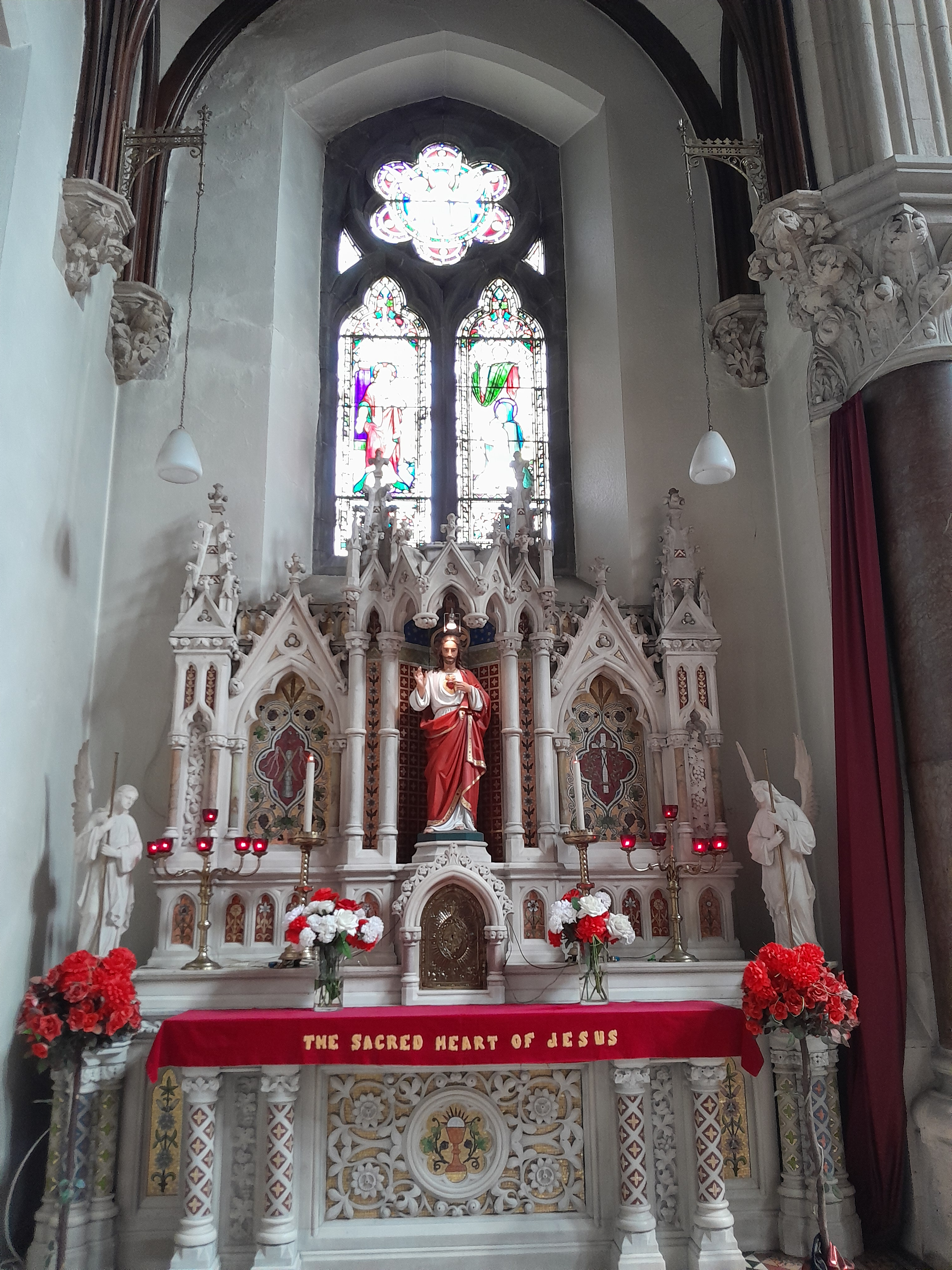

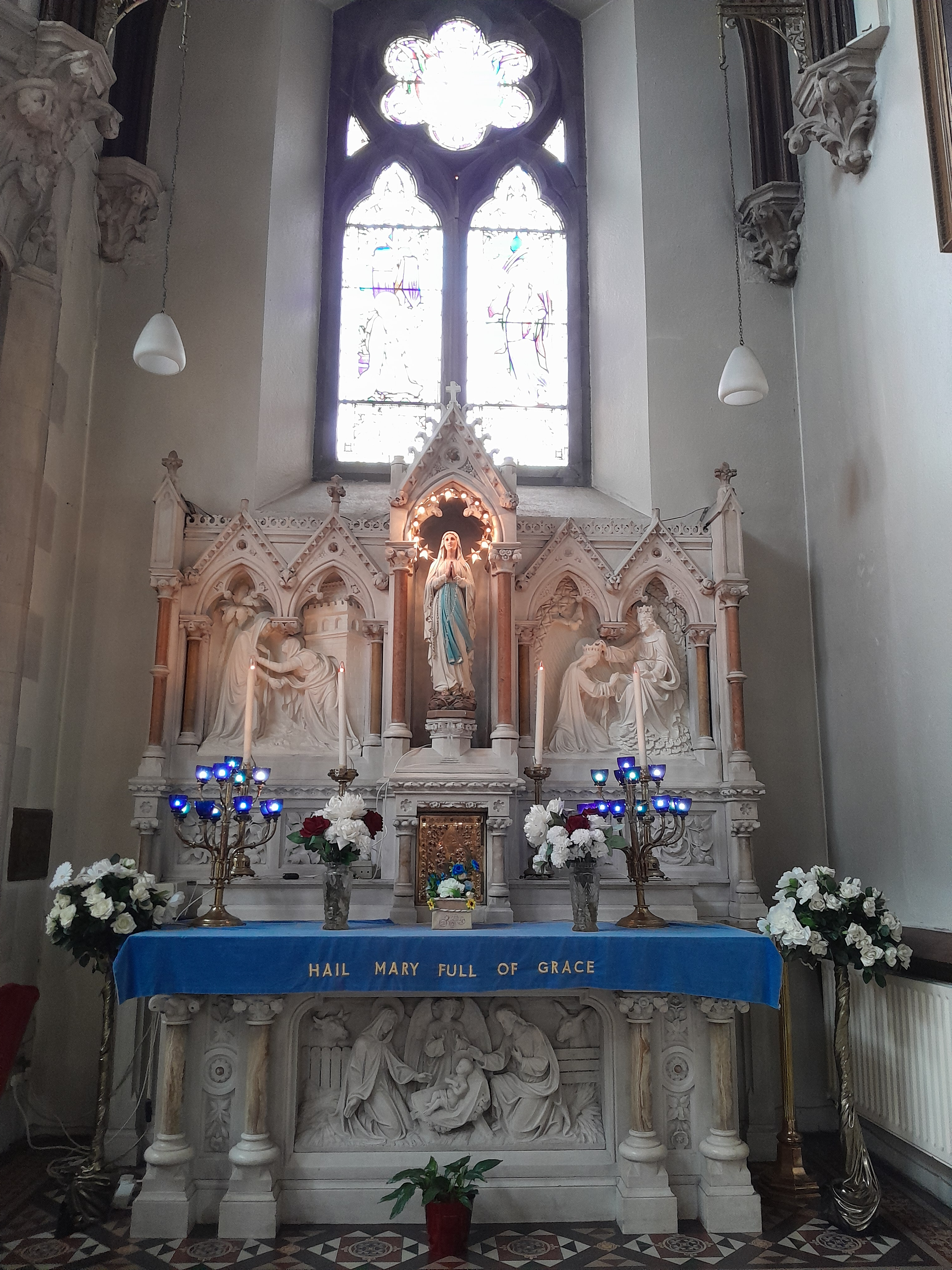

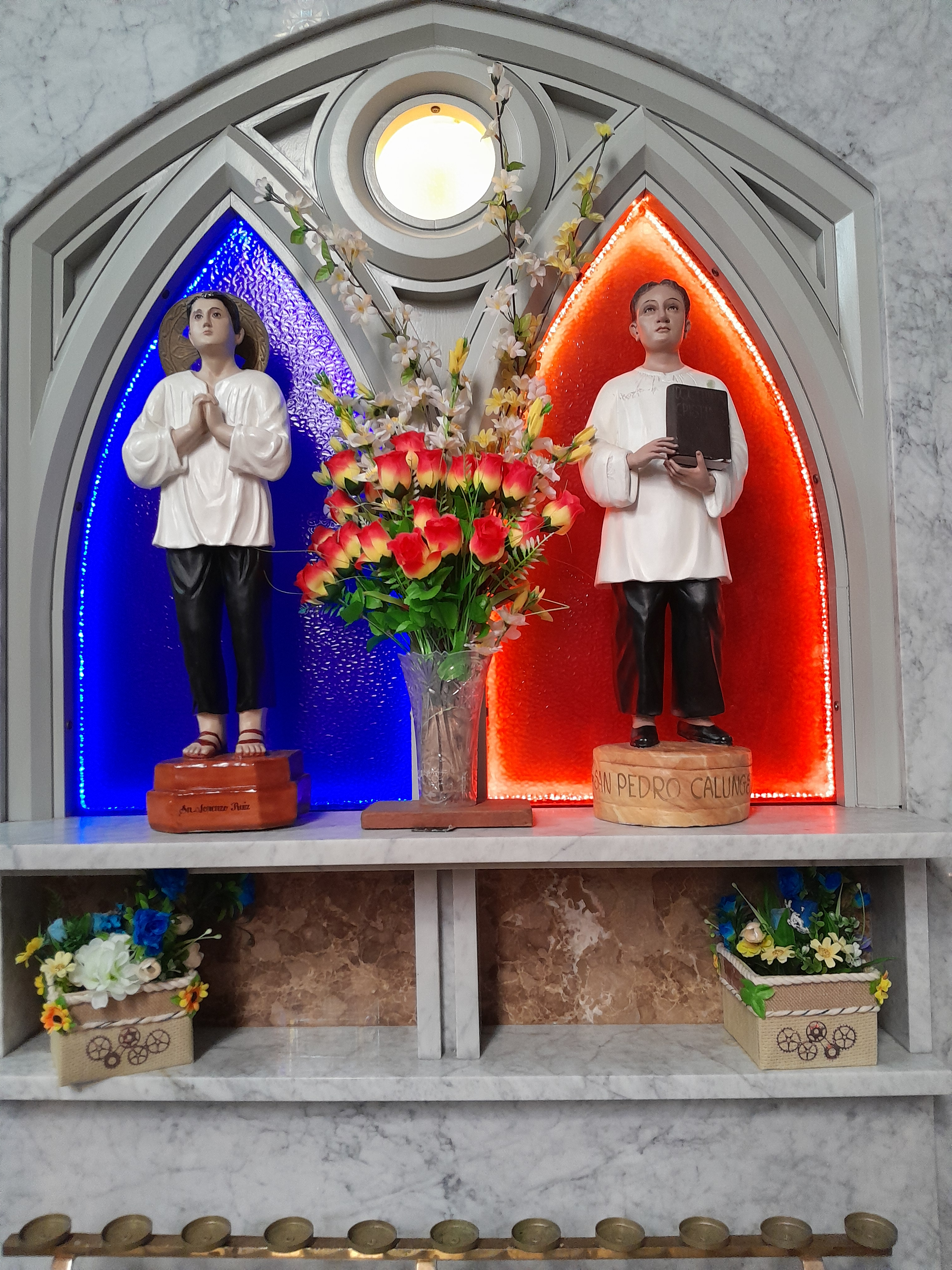
