= North Wall railway station =

Former railway terminus in the North Wall area of Dublin

North Wall Railway Station

General information
- Coordinates: 53.3476°N 6.2375°W
- Owner: London and North Western Railway

History
- Opened: November 1877
- Closed: 1922
Location

North Wall was one of Dublin's six original rail termini, the others being Westland Row (now Pearse Station), Amiens Street (now Connolly Station), Kingsbridge (now Heuston Station), Broadstone and Harcourt Street (now a bar and nightclub complex).

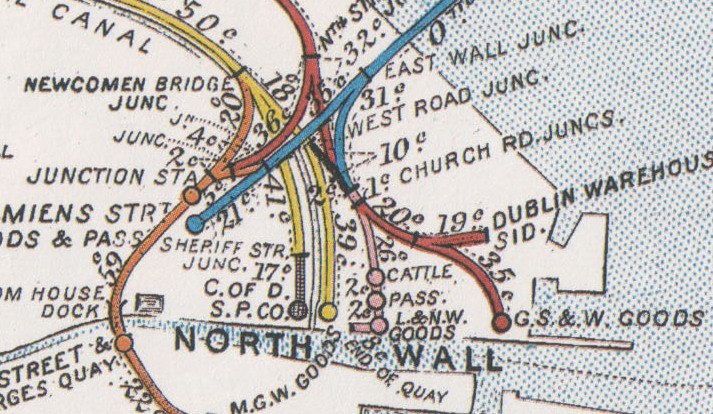
Dublin North Wall station and yards

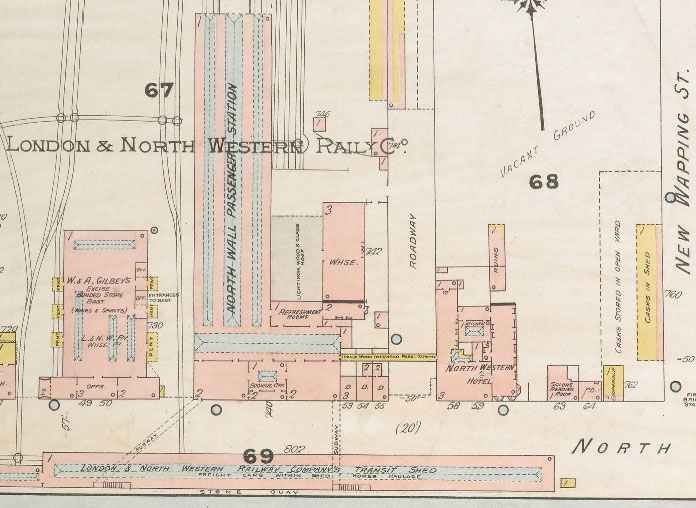
North Western Hotel, Insurance Plan 1893

== History ==
The London and North Western Railway (LNWR) moved the Dublin terminus of their passenger service from Kingstown (Dún Laoghaire) to North Wall in 1861. The railway passenger station was then opened and was only used for boat trains.

The passenger service to the railway station closed in 1922.

As of 2020 the station and adjoining lands were reserved for use as a possible station on the DART Underground alongside the Spencer Dock Luas stop.

== London and North Western Hotel ==
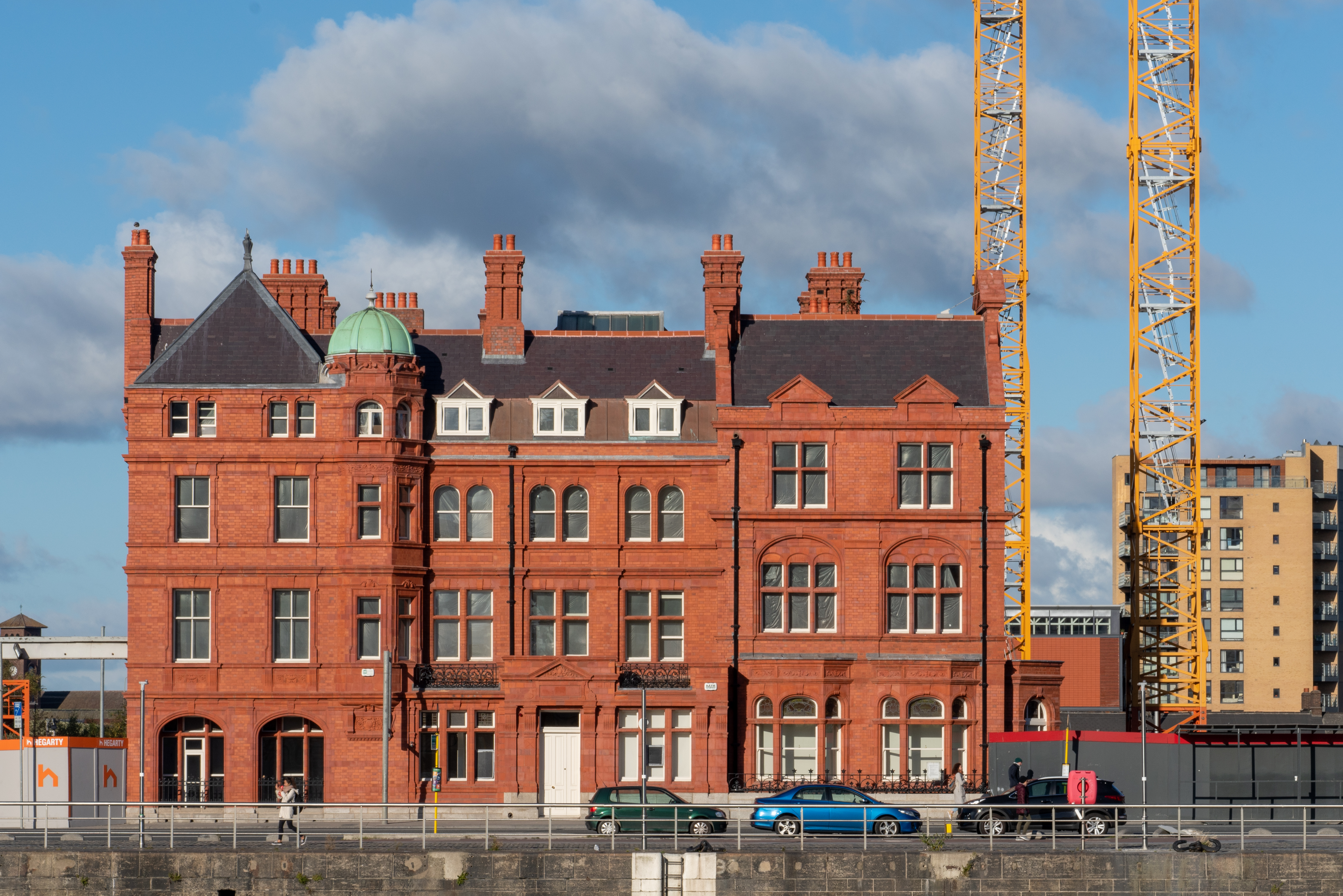
London and North Western Hotel, Dublin (1884)

The LNWR also opened an adjacent hotel in 1884. It was closed in 1922 and then was subsequently used for offices.

== Freight Depot ==
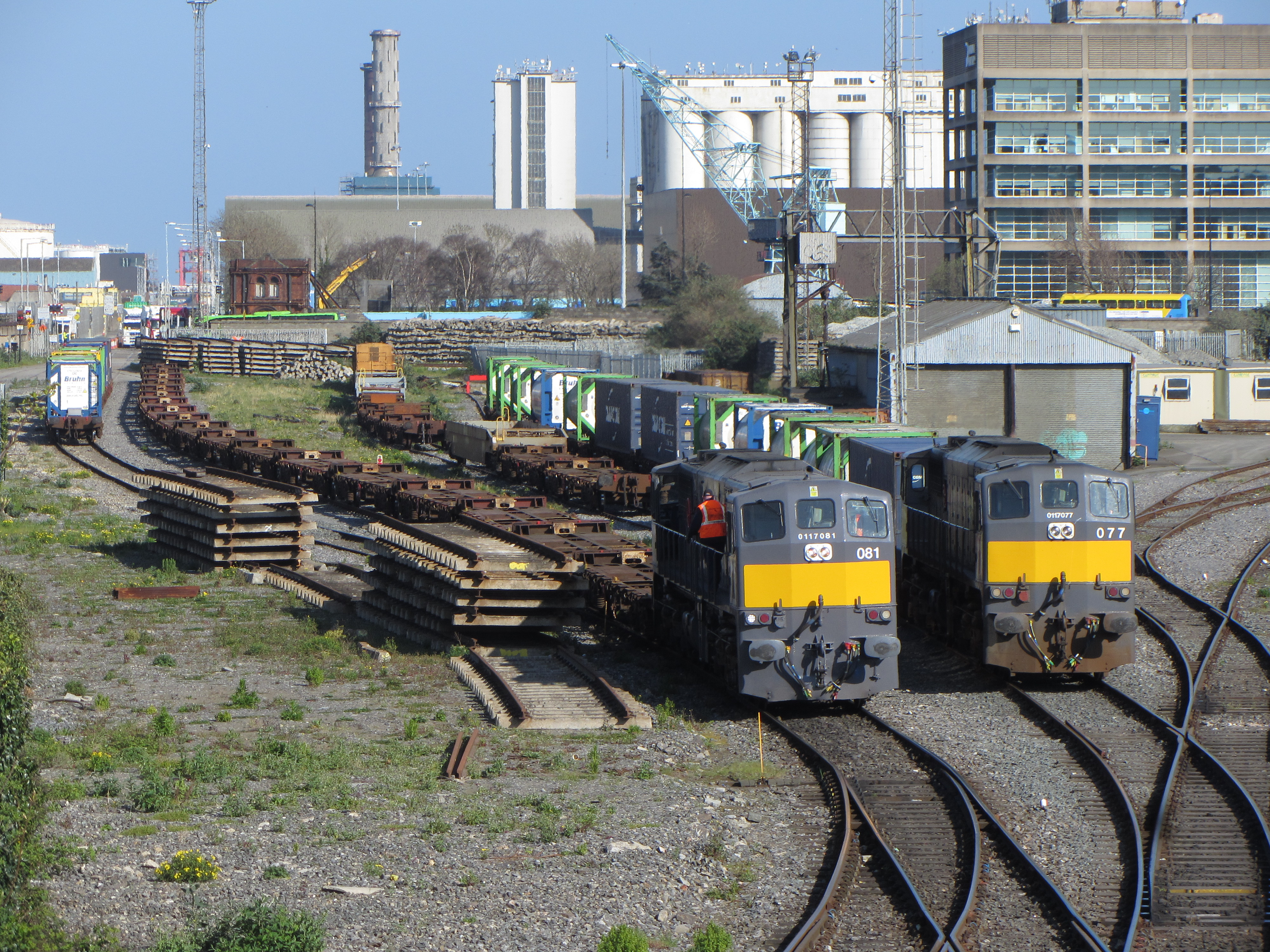
North Wall freight yard in 2017

The associated freight depot remains actively in use through many of its constituent yards have closed from the 1970s. North Wall in a freight context will refer to the freight yard.
