= List of heritage railways in Northern Ireland =

There are currently two operating heritage railways in Northern Ireland.

== Operating heritage railways ==
- Downpatrick and County Down Railway is located on part of the former Belfast & County Down Railway and is Ireland's only heritage railway using the standard Irish track gauge of 5 feet 3 inches (1.60 m). It has approximately 3 miles (4.8 km) of track, with branches to Inch Abbey, Magnus Barefoot's grave and Downpatrick station from a triangular junction. It operates with preserved steam and diesel locomotives and vintage wooden carriages.
- Giant's Causeway and Bushmills Railway is on the north coast in County Antrim. Narrow gauge steam-powered services run from the Giant's Causeway to Bushmills. Laid on part of the course of the original Giant's Causeway Tramway, which was electric-powered with its own hydroelectric plant (the first such system in the world).

== Former heritage railways ==
- Foyle Valley Railway was the name of two former narrow-gauge railways in Derry which used rolling stock from the former County Donegal Railways Joint Committee. The first (1975–1978) consisted of 300 metres of track at Victoria Road station. The second (1993–c.2000) stretched approximately 2 miles (3.2 km) south-west from the museum building on Foyle Road. The current owners of the museum have tentative plans to reopen the railway.
- Shane's Castle Railway was a tourist railway in the grounds of the castle which used preserved narrow gauge steam locomotives. It was 1.5 miles (2.4 km) long and operated between 1971 and 1995.
- Kings Road Railway was operated by William McCormick in the 1960s and 70s in his back garden in Knock, Belfast using a former industrial narrow gauge steam locomotive.

== See also ==
- List of British heritage and private railways
- Conservation in the United Kingdom
- Index of conservation articles
- List of heritage railways
- List of heritage railways in the Republic of Ireland
- List of narrow-gauge railways in Ireland
- Foyle Valley Railway Museum
- Railway Preservation Society of Ireland
- Ulster Folk and Transport Museum
