= Giant's Causeway (disambiguation) =

The Giant's Causeway is an area of 40,000 interlocking basalt columns resulting from a volcanic eruption on the coast of Northern Ireland.

Giant's Causeway may also refer to:

- Giant's Causeway (horse), Europe's Horse of the Year in 2000
- Giant's Causeway, New South Wales, stretch of water in between Cook Island and Fingal Head in Australia
- Giant's Causeway and Bushmills Railway, Heritage railway in Northern Ireland
- Giant's Causeway Tramway, predecessor of the above
- A variant of the Baguenaudier puzzle, called Giant's Causeway
- Giant's Causeway (song), the B Side of Scooter's single Maria (I Like It Loud)
- Giant's Causeway (band), German gothic-doom band of the 1990s
- Giant's Causeway Stakes, American thoroughbred horse race
