= List of heritage railways in the Republic of Ireland =

There are a small number of heritage railways in the Republic of Ireland, reflecting Ireland's long history of rail transport. Some former operations have closed, and aspirant operations may have museums and even rolling stock, but no operating track. There are also working groups, which may run heritage rolling stock on main lines.

== Heritage railways ==
=== Operating ===
Some of the main preserved or restored railways include:

- Fintown Railway, based in Fintown, County Donegal, which runs along the length of Lough Finn to Glenties Line for about a mile
- Listowel and Ballybunion Railway, a section of the Lartigue Monorail system, has been restored for visitors in Listowel, County Kerry
- Stradbally Woodland Railway, County Laois
- Waterford Suir Valley Railway, County Waterford, running a narrow-gauge railway for 10 km (6.2 mi) from Kilmeaden Station along the former mainline route from Waterford to Mallow. It operates alongside the Waterford Greenway and is Ireland's longest heritage line.
- Connemara Railway, County Galway

=== Under development / suspended ===
- West Clare Railway – installation intact but closed 1 June 2022 until further notice

=== Defunct ===
- Clonmacnoise and West Offaly Railway in County Offaly, run by Bord na Móna, near Shannonbridge, closed 2008
- Tralee and Dingle Light Railway, between Tralee and Dingle, which operated 1993–2013

== Railway museums ==
- Castlerea Railway Museum, County Roscommon
- Cavan and Leitrim Railway, County Leitrim
- The Donegal Railway Heritage Centre in County Donegal, commemorating the operations of the County Donegal Railways Joint Committee which once had two narrow-gauge railway systems

== Preservation groups ==
Preservation groups in the Republic of Ireland include:

- The Irish Steam Preservation Society, based in Stradbally, County Laois, which operates the Stradbally Woodland Railway with vintage steam and diesel locomotives.
- The Irish Traction Group, which has a diesel locomotive collection at a site near the Limerick–Waterford railway route, also operates heritage diesel locomotives on the Downpatrick & Co Down Railway.
- The Railway Preservation Society of Ireland, an all-island body, with bases in County Antrim and Dublin, and a museum in the former; holds a full operating licence and operates heritage-themed excursions on the main lines from time to time.

== See also ==
- Conservation in the Republic of Ireland
- Index of conservation articles
- List of heritage railways
- List of heritage railways in Northern Ireland
- List of narrow-gauge railways in Ireland
- List of steam locomotives in Ireland
