= List of narrow-gauge railways in Ireland =

Ireland formerly had numerous narrow-gauge railways, most of which were built to a gauge of 3 ft (914 mm). The last (non-preserved) line to close was the West Clare Railway in 1961 (though it has been partially preserved).

== 3 ft (914 mm) railways ==
=== Northern Ireland ===
==== Operating ====
- Foyle Valley Railway Museum
- Giant's Causeway and Bushmills Railway

==== Defunct ====
| Railway | Opened | Closed | Length | Notes |
|---|---|---|---|---|
| Ballycastle Railway | 1880 | 1950 | 17 mi (27 km) | |
| Ballymena and Larne Railway | 1877 | 1950 | 36 mi (58 km) | Ruling gradient: 1 in 36 |
| Ballymena, Cushendall and Red Bay Railway | 1875 | 1940 | 16 mi (26 km) | Highest railway in Ireland at 1,045 ft (319 m) |
| Bessbrook and Newry Tramway | 1885 | 1948 | 3 mi (4.8 km) | |
| Castlederg and Victoria Bridge Tramway | 1883 | 1933 | 7 1/4 mi (11.7 km) | |
| Clogher Valley Railway | 1887 | 1942 | 37 mi (60 km) | |
| Giant's Causeway Tramway | 1883 | 1949 | 9 1/4 mi (14.9 km) | Electric |
| Glenariff Iron Ore and Harbour Company | 1873 | 1884 | 4 mi (6.4 km) | |
| Londonderry and Lough Swilly Railway | 1853 | 1953 | 99 mi (159 km) | Crossed into County Donegal, Ireland |
| Portstewart Tramway | 1882 | 1926 | 1.85 mi (2.98 km) | |
| Strabane and Letterkenny Railway | 1909 | 1960 | 19.25 mi (30.98 km) | Crossed into County Donegal |
| Warrenpoint and Rostrevor Tramway | 1877 | 1915 | 3.3 mi (5.3 km) | Damaged during storm, not restored |

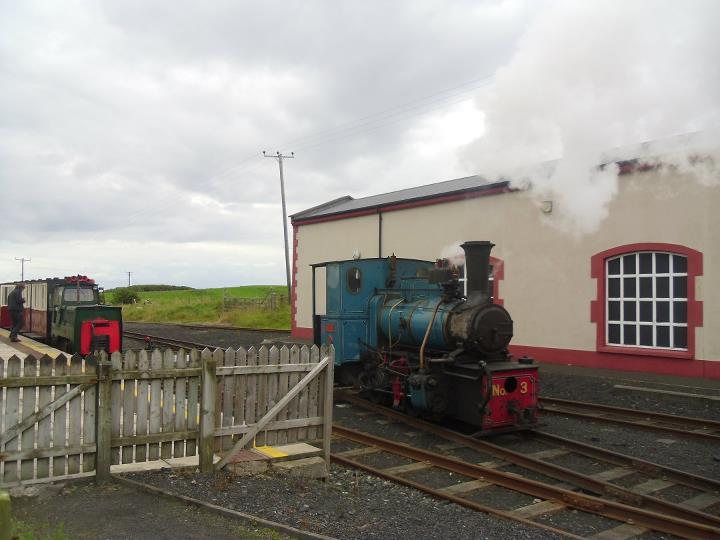
A Giant's Causeway & Bushmills Railway station.

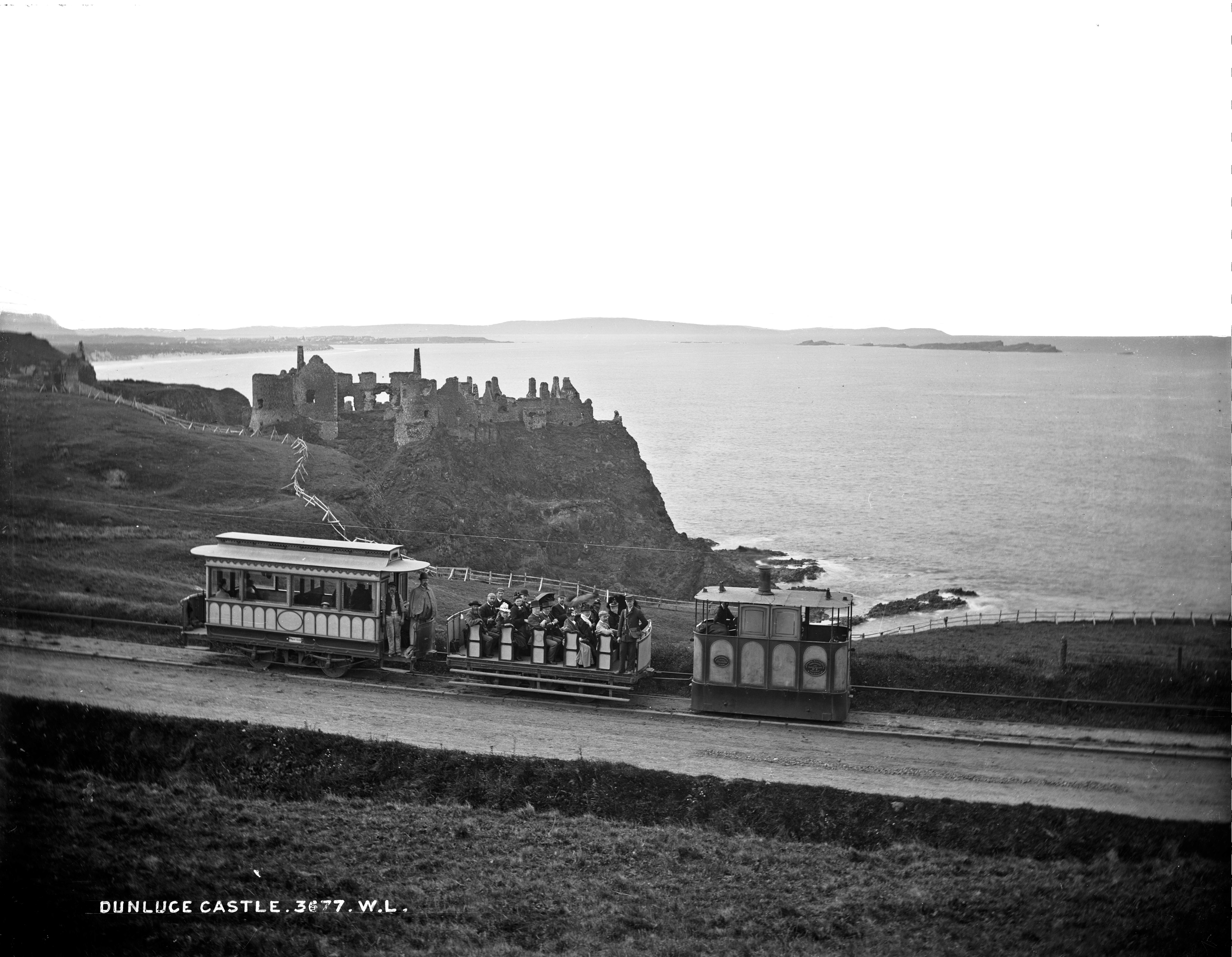
The defunct Giant's Causeway Tramway near Dunluce Castle c. 1890.

=== Republic of Ireland ===
==== Operating ====
- Cavan and Leitrim Railway
- Fintown Railway
- Stradbally Woodland Railway
- Tralee and Dingle Light Railway (Under repair)
- Waterford and Suir Valley Railway
- West Clare Railway
- Note: The peat processing State enterprise, Bord na Mona, also operated narrow-gauge industrial (staff-only) railways on multiple bogs, and some may still be extant.

==== Defunct ====
| Railway | Opened | Closed | Length | Notes |
|---|---|---|---|---|
| Clonmacnoise and West Offaly Railway | 1990s | 2008 | tourist attraction | |
| Cork, Blackrock and Passage Railway | 1902 | 1932 | 16 mi (26 km) | 1850: 5 ft 3 in (1,600 mm) |
| Cork and Muskerry Light Railway | 1887 | 1934 | 25 mi (40 km) | |
| County Donegal Railways Joint Committee | 1892 | 1960 | 121 mi (195 km) | 1863: 5 ft 3 in (1,600 mm) |
| Dublin and Lucan tramway | 1880 | 1897 | 7 mi (11 km) | |
| Galway and Salthill Tramway | 1879 | 1918 | 2.13 mi (3.43 km) | |
| Schull and Skibbereen Railway | 1886 | 1947 | 15 1/2 mi (24.9 km) | |
| Tralee and Dingle Light Railway | 1891 | 1953 | 32 mi (51 km) | |
| West Donegal Railway | 1860 | 1892 | 18 mi (29 km) | merged into Donegal Railway Company |

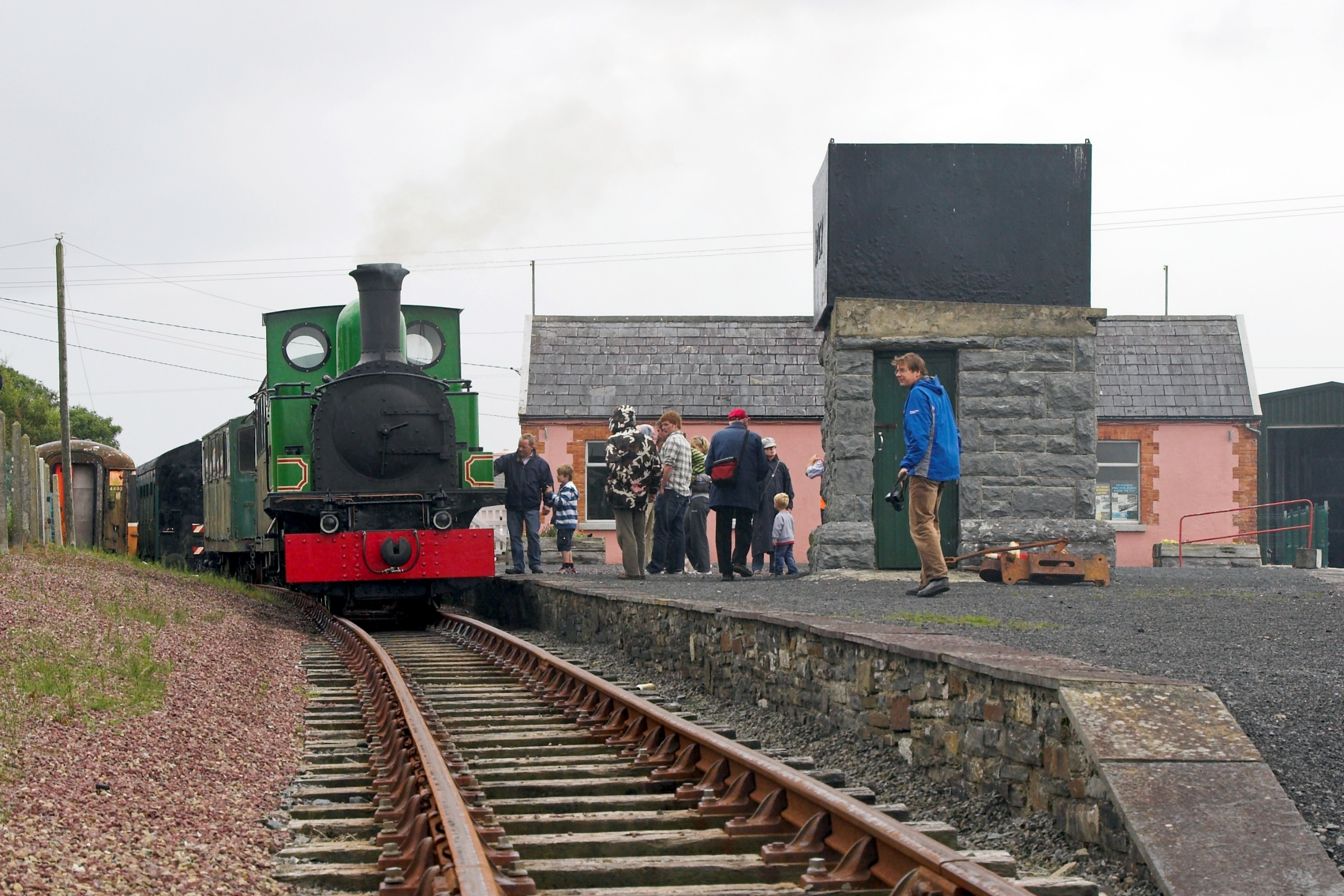
The Slieve Callan locomotive stopped at a station on the West Clare Railway.

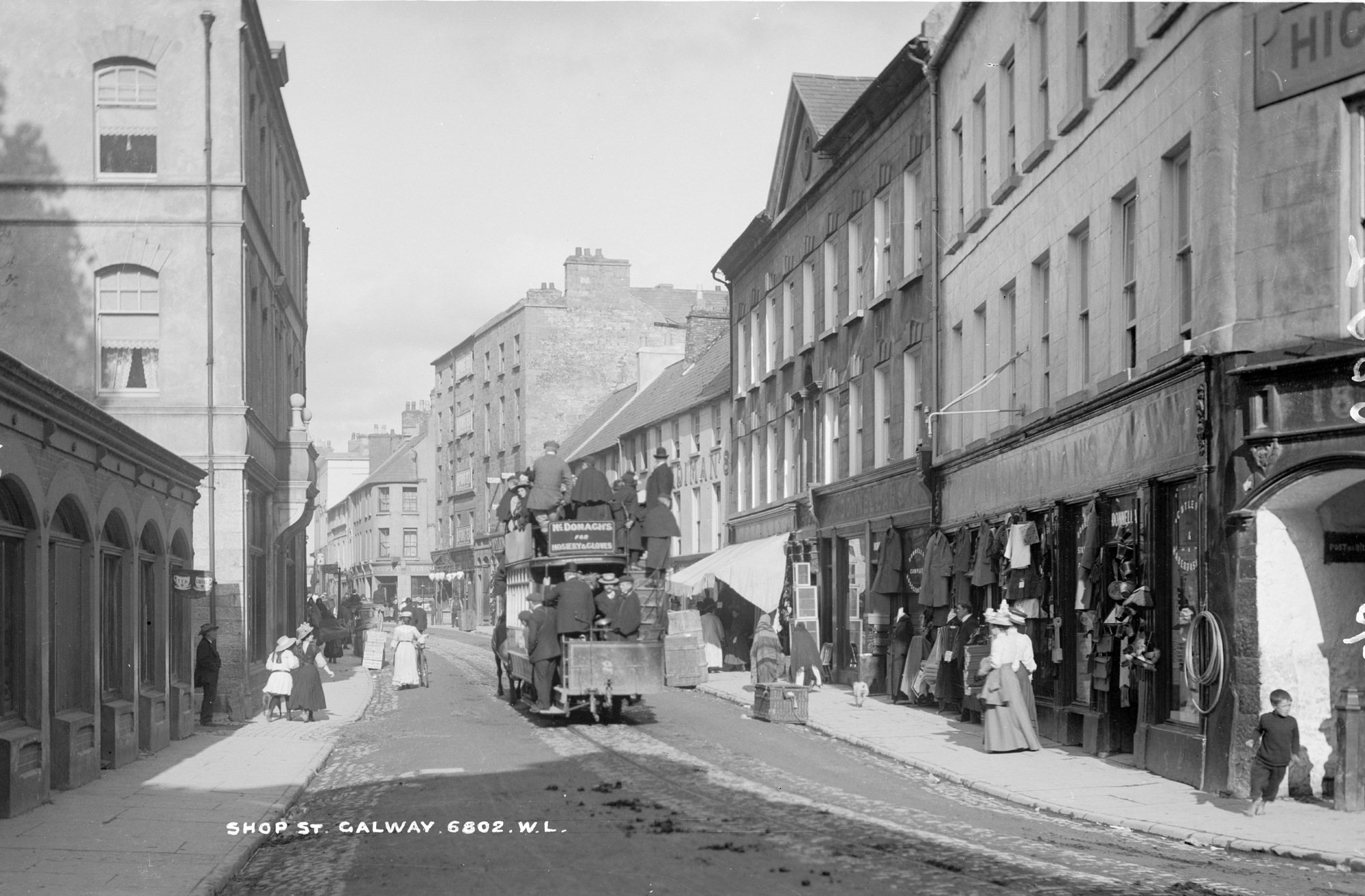
Passengers riding on the defunct Galway and Salthill Tramway c. 1910.

== 900 mm (2 ft 11 7/16 in) gauge railways ==
Cork Electric Tramways and Lighting Company; opened 1898, closed 1931

== 3 ft 6 in (1,067 mm) gauge railways ==
Dublin and Lucan Electric Railway; opened 1900, closed 1925

== 2 ft (610 mm) gauge railways ==
Steam Train Express (located in the Emerald Park (formerly Tayto Park) theme park); opened 2015 (operating)

== 1 ft 10 in (559 mm) gauge railways ==
The St James's Gate Brewery narrow-gauge tramway, constructed 1873, closed 1975

== 15 in (381 mm) gauge railways ==
=== Northern Ireland ===
Bellevue Park Railway (located in Bellevue Park); opened 1933, closed 1950 (defunct - park still operating)

=== Republic of Ireland ===
Difflin Lake Railway (located in Oakfield Park); opened 2003 (operating)

== Monorails ==
Listowel and Ballybunion Railway; opened 1888, closed 1924; partially preserved

== See also ==
- History of rail transport in Ireland
- List of heritage railways in Northern Ireland
- List of heritage railways in the Republic of Ireland
- British narrow-gauge railways
- Donegal Railway Heritage Centre
