= Susanna Drury =

Irish artist (c. 1698–c. 1770)

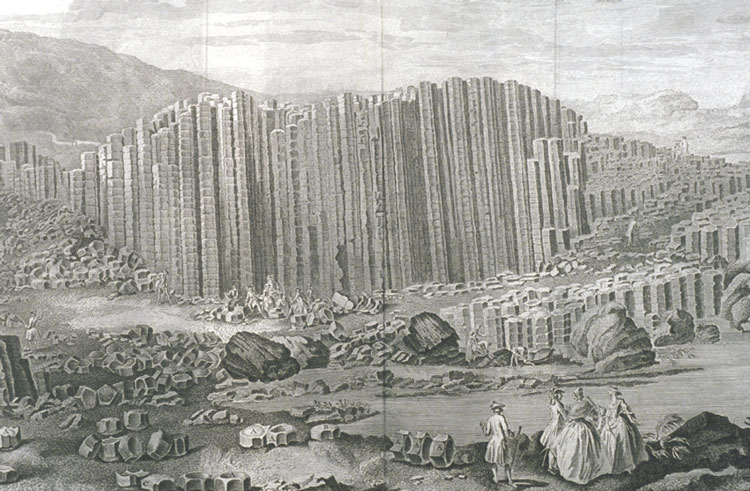
- Engraving of Drury's A View of the Giant's Causeway: East Prospect
- Born: c. 1698
- Died: c. 1770
- Known for: painting

Susanna Drury, later Susanna Warter (c. 1698 – c. 1770) was an Irish painter. Though little is known of her life or work, she was very influential in the development of Irish landscape painting. She is chiefly noted for her watercolor drawings of the Giant's Causeway in County Antrim, which brought international attention to the site.

== Life ==
Drury was born around 1698. A work entitled ‘One Tree Hill, Greenwich Park’ (signed and dated 1733) suggests that she received instruction and lived in London around this time.

She was associated with the Dublin Society (later the Royal Dublin Society), which presented her with an award £25 in 1740 for her paintings of the Giant's Causeway. She was the first woman in Ireland to receive this award. She had traveled to Ulster to observe the site firsthand, and spent several months there working. Her drawings are composed of gouache on vellum and present two views of the Causeway from the east and west. These paintings show accurate details of the jointing forming the basalt columns of the Causeway. The paintings brought attention to the formation, and the popularity of Irish monument paintings boomed in their wake. Engravings were made by François Vivares between 1743 and 1744. Prints made from these engravings were popular in Europe and were widely circulated in scientific communities; in 1765 an entry for the Causeway appeared in volume 12 of the French Encyclopédie which clearly relied on the engraving of Drury's paintings. A plate made from the engraving of Drury's "East Prospect" itself later appeared unattributed in a volume of plates published for the Encyclopédie. It was included in the geology section along with two other plates depicting similar basalt formations in France, and included a caption by Nicolas Desmarest proposing, for the first time in print, that the structures were volcanic in origin.

As a Susannah Warter is mentioned in the will of Franklin Drury (1770), it is thought that she had married by this date. Her original gouache drawings of the Giant's Causeway now hang in the Ulster Museum in Belfast.
