= Fintown railway station =

Defunct railway station in County Donegal, Ireland

Coordinates: 54°52′14″N 8°06′48″W

Fintown Baile na Finne
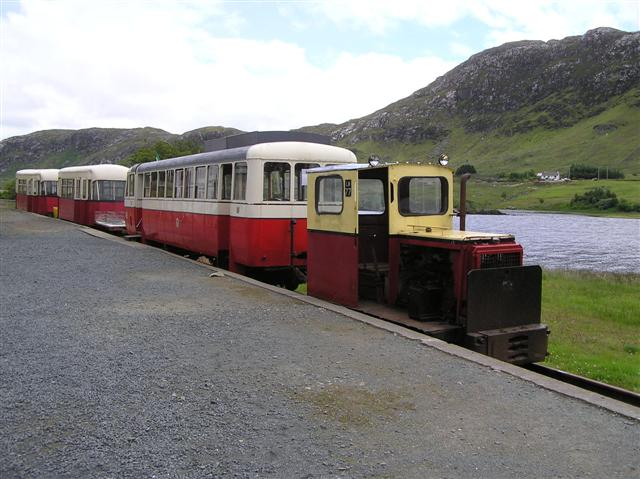
- Fintown Railway train

General information
- Location: Fintown, County Donegal; Ireland

History
- Original company: Donegal Railway Company, County Donegal Railways Joint Committee

Key dates
- 3 June 1903: Station opens
- 15 December 1947: Station closes to passenger traffic
- 10 March 1952: Station closes to freight traffic
- 3 June 1995: Station reopens as part of heritage railway
Location

Fintown Railway station served the village of Fintown in County Donegal, Ireland.

The station opened on 3 June 1903 on the Donegal Railway Company line from Glenties to Stranorlar. It closed on 15 December 1947 when the County Donegal Railways Joint Committee closed the line from Glenties to Stranorlar in an effort to save money. Freight services on the route continued until 10 March 1952.

The station re-opened on 3 June 1995 to serve the newly formed 3 ft (914 mm) narrow gauge Fintown Railway along a former route used by the County Donegal Railways Joint Committee. The railway runs from Fintown towards Glenties, alongside Lough Finn.

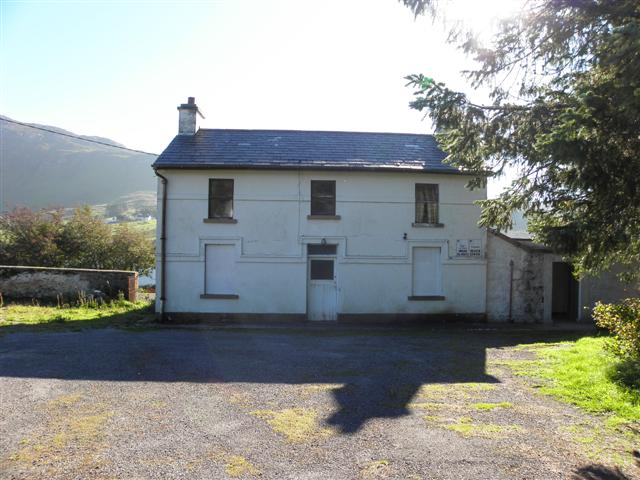
Fintown Railway station in 2010

== See also ==
- List of heritage railways in the Republic of Ireland
- List of narrow-gauge railways in Ireland

Preceding station	Disused railways	Following station
Shallogan's Halt	Donegal Railway Company; Glenties to Stranorlar	Ballinamore
