= Enda Bonner =

Irish politician and sportsperson (1949–2026)

Senator
- In office 17 September 1997 – 12 September 2002
- Constituency: Nominated by the Taoiseach

Donegal County Councillor
- In office June 1999 – June 2019
- Constituency: Glenties

Personal details
- Born: October 1949 County Donegal, Ireland
- Died: 27 August 2026 (aged 76) Letterkenny, Ireland
- Party: Fianna Fáil
- Education: Gormanston College
- Profession: Accountant

Enda Bonner (October 1949 – 27 August 2026) was an Irish Fianna Fáil politician and sportsperson. He was a councillor for the Glenties electoral area of Donegal County Council from 1999 to 2019. Bonner was also a Senator from 1997 to 2002. He unsuccessfully contested the 1997 general election in Donegal South-West.

Bonner played for the Donegal county football team. He was a senior partner in an auditors and accountants firm based in Letterkenny.

In March 2021, he gave an interview to the Donegal News in which he commented on Fianna Fáil and the party's members of the Oireachtas. He described Barry Cowen and Dara Calleary as "good people" whom party leader Micheál Martin had "got rid of" and Niall Collins as "another good man". However, he said Charlie McConalogue and Niall Blaney's favouring of a coalition with Fine Gael was due to self-interest. He criticised the appointment of Stephen Donnelly as Minister for Health but also criticised the timing of opposition from within Fianna Fáil to Micheál Martin continuing as Taoiseach.

Bonner died on 27 August 2026, at the age of 76. He was a cousin of former international goalkeeper, Packie Bonner. He was chairman of his local GAA club.
