= Glenties railway station =

Railway station in Ireland

Glenties

General information
- Location: Glenties, County Donegal; Ireland
- Coordinates: 54.8011°N 8.2846°W

History
- Post-grouping: Donegal Railway Company

Key dates
- 3 June 1895: Station opens
- 15 December 1947: Station closes
Location

Glenties railway station served the village of Glenties in County Donegal, Ireland.

The station opened on 3 June 1895 when the Donegal Railway Company opened their line from Glenties to Stranorlar.

It closed on 15 December 1947 when the County Donegal Railways Joint Committee closed the line from Glenties to Stranorlar in an effort to save money.

Freight services on the route continued until 10 March 1952.

== Routes ==
Preceding station	Disused railways	Following station
Terminus	Donegal Railway Company; Glenties to Stranorlar	Shallogan's Halt
