= Shane's Castle =

Castle in County Antrim, Northern Ireland

Coordinates: 54°43.9165′N 6°16.2196′W

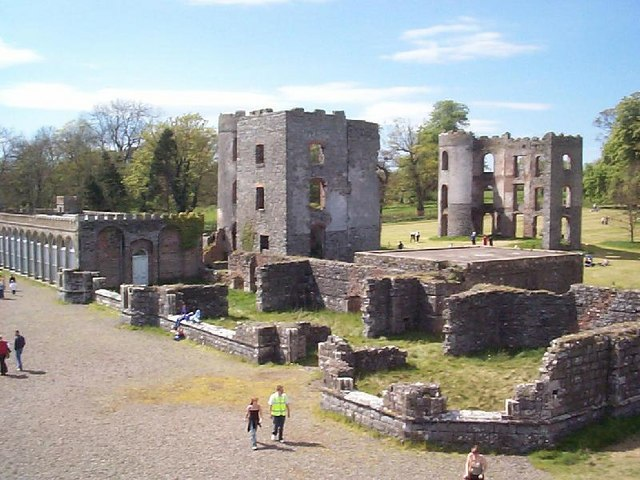
Photograph from 1 May 2002

Shane's Castle is a ruined castle near Antrim in Northern Ireland, which was mostly destroyed in 1816 by fire. The castle is situated on the north-east shores of Lough Neagh, 2.7 miles from Randalstown. Built in 1345 by a member of the Clandeboy O'Neill dynasty, it was originally known as Edenduffcarrick, meaning "brow of black rock" (from the Irish éadán dúcharraige). It owes its present name to Shane McBrian McPhelim O'Neill, who ruled Lower Clandeboy between 1595 and 1617.

== History ==
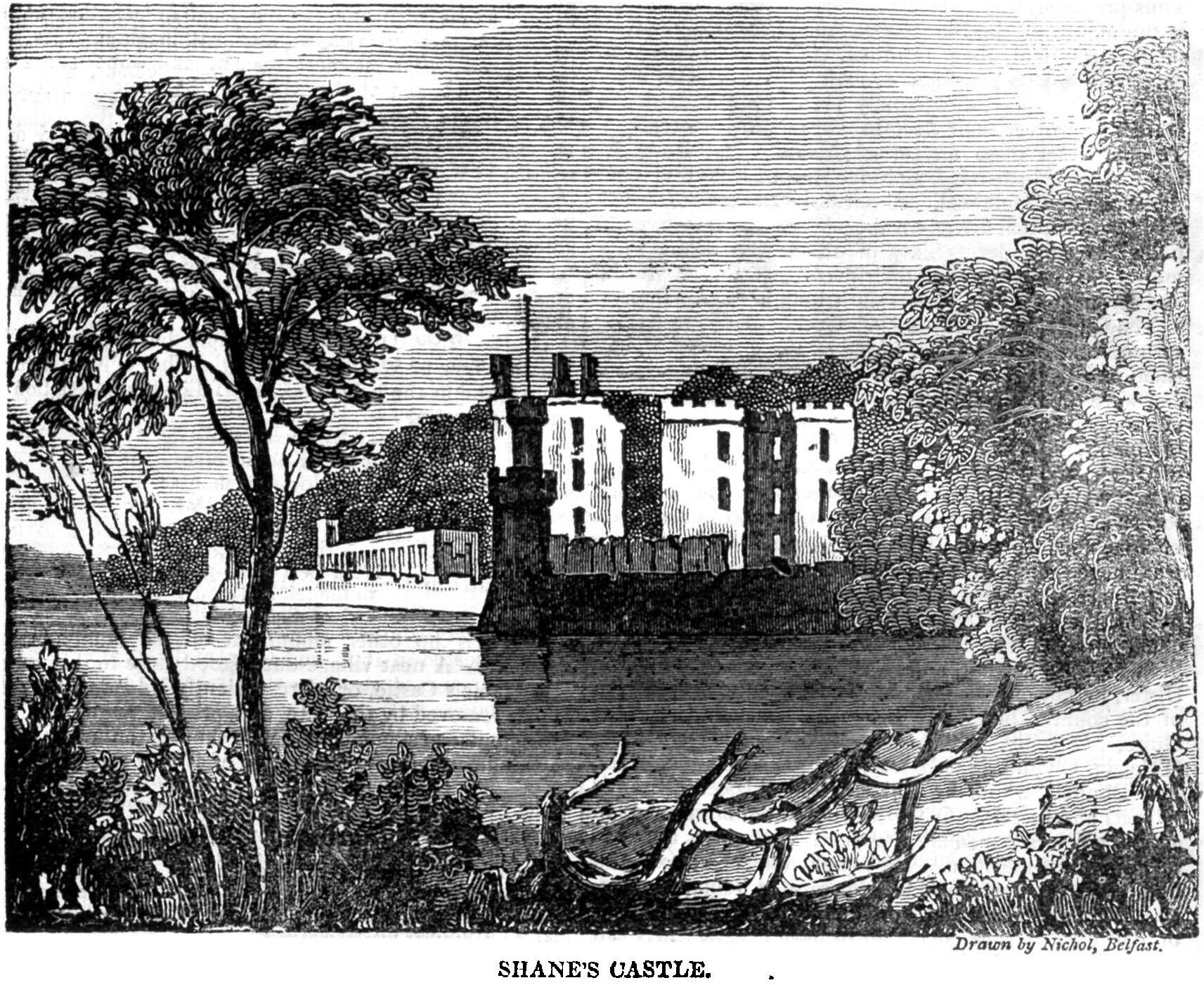
Shane's Castle, Dublin Penny Journal 1833

Shane's Castle was originally built in 1345. In 1809, it was decided to rebuild the Plantation castle to a design by John Nash, however a fire in 1816 left the castle in ruins though the family papers were saved. Subsequently a large Victorian-Gothic castle was built in the 1860s: this survived until it was burnt down by the IRA on 20 May 1922.

== In popular culture ==
The castle's 1816 destruction by fire was the subject of John Neal's poem "Castle Shane", published in The Portico the same year. The ruins have been used in the HBO TV series Game of Thrones.

== Shane's Castle Railway ==
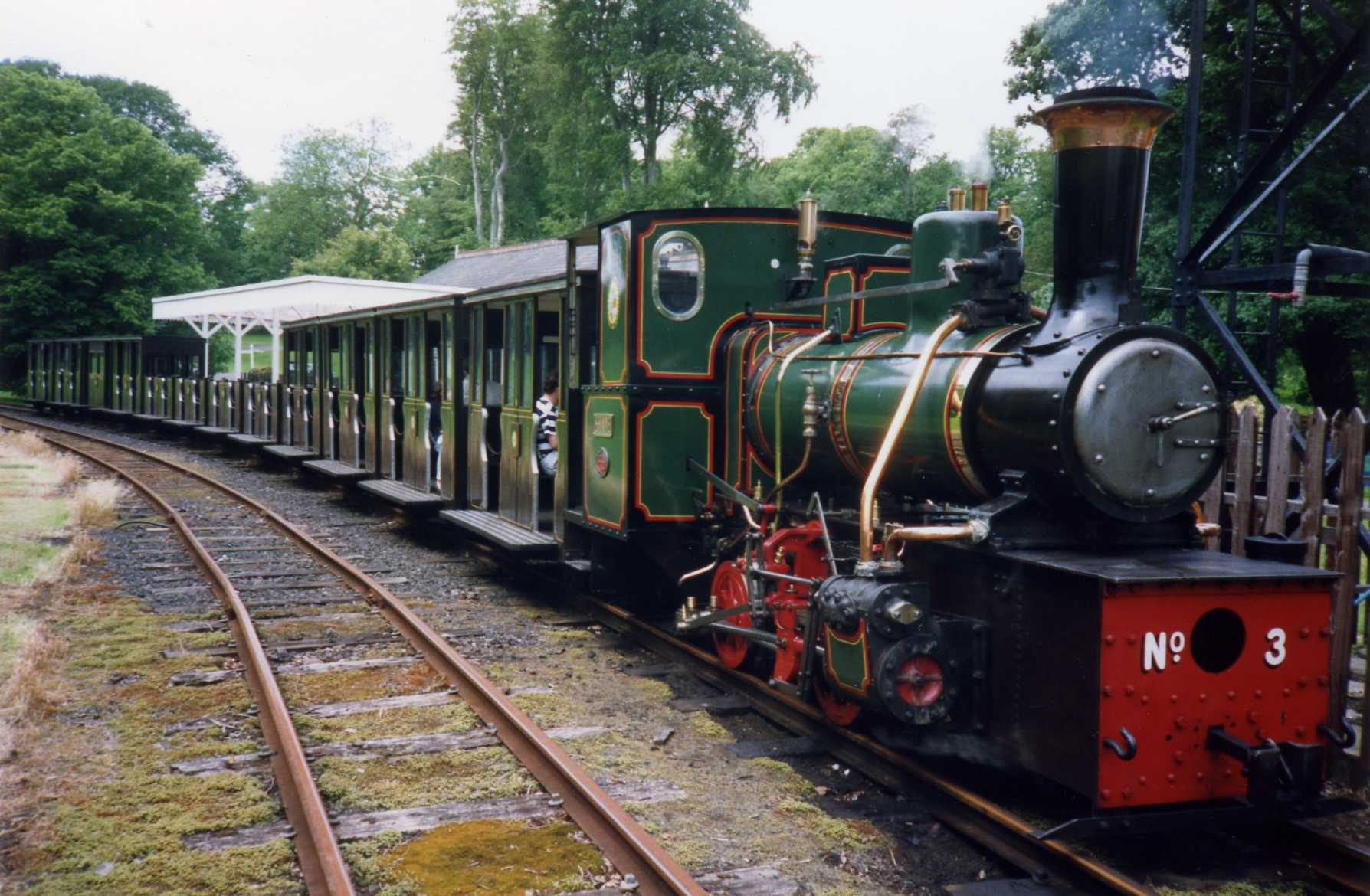
Shane's Castle Railway

=== History ===
Shane's Castle Railway was a 3 ft (914 mm) gauge tourist railway in the grounds of the castle run by Raymond O'Neill, 4th Baron O'Neill. It was laid by NIR staff in their spare time using 75 pounds per yard (37 kg/m) track with curves to CDRJC standards and opened on 30 April 1971. The line had three stations (Antrim, Millburn and Shane's Castle) and was 1 mile 40 chains (2.4 km) long. It closed on 31 October 1995 due to declining visitor numbers

There had previously been a 2 ft (610 mm) gauge line in the castle grounds between 1940 and 1956, which was used by the British Army for transport to and from a bomb dump.

=== Rolling stock ===
Number	Name	Power	Wheel Arrangement	Manufacturer	Works Number and Year	Origin	Fate	Note
1	Tyrone	Steam	0-4-0T	Peckett and Sons	1026 of 1903	Worked at British Aluminum Company, Larne. Afterwards run on a small railway in the back garden of William McCormick in Knock, Belfast, then passed to Lord O'Neill in 1969.	Passed to Giant's Causeway and Bushmills Railway.	
2	Rory	Diesel, 50 hp	4wDM	Motor Rail	11039 of 1956	Worked at Charles Tennant, Dungiven.	Passed to Giant's Causeway and Bushmills Railway.	
3	Shane	Steam	0-4-0WT	Andrew Barclay Sons & Co.	2265 of 1949	Worked at Bord na Móna, Clonsast	Passed to Giant's Causeway and Bushmills Railway.	
4 (1st)	Nippy	Diesel	4wDM	F.C. Hibberd & Co Ltd	2014 of 1936	Worked at Safety in Mines Research Establishment, Buxton. Acquired for Shane's Castle via Narrow Gauge Railway Society.	Passed to Irish Steam Preservation Society at Stradbally in 1986.	
4 (2nd)	Nippy	Diesel		Motor Rail	of 1976	Worked at Blue Circle Industries, Kilvington. Purchased for Shane's Castle in 1984.		
5	Nancy	Steam	0-6-0T	Avonside Engine Company	1547 of 1908	Built in 1908 for Stanton Ironworks, Leicestershire.	Passed to Cavan and Leitrim Railway.	Restoration never completed at Shane's Castle
6 (1st)	Columbkille	Steam	2-6-4T	Nasmyth, Wilson & Co. Ltd.	830 of 1907	Originally of County Donegal Railways. Purchased in 1960 by the American Dr Cox but never left Ireland. Later acquired by North West of Ireland Railway Society and run between 1975 and 1978 at Londonderry Victoria Road.	Exhibited at Foyle Valley Railway.	
6 (2nd)		Diesel		Motor Rail	of 1974	Worked at Blue Circle Industries, Kilvington. Purchased for Shane's Castle in 1984.	Passed to Fintown Railway.	
12		Diesel (railcar)	0-4-0+4wDMR	Walker Brothers (Wigan) at Dundalk, GNR(I)	of 1934	Originally of County Donegal Railways. Purchased in 1960 by the American Dr Cox but never left Ireland. Later acquired by North West of Ireland Railway Society and run between 1975 and 1978 at Londonderry Victoria Road.	Run between 1990 and 2000 at Foyle Valley Railway.	
18		Diesel (railcar)	0-4-0+4wDMR	Walker Brothers (Wigan) at Dundalk, GNR(I)	of 1940	Originally of County Donegal Railways. Purchased in 1960 by the American Dr Cox but never left Ireland. Later acquired by North West of Ireland Railway Society and run between 1975 and 1978 at Londonderry Victoria Road.	Run between 1990 and 2000 at Foyle Valley Railway. Running at Fintown Railway since 2003.	
			2w-2PMR	D Wickham & Co	7441 of 1956			
		n/a				Purpose-built open-sided carriages for the railway	Passed to Giant's Causeway and Bushmills Railway. Rebuilt as enclosed carriages.	
		n/a				Three tramcar trailers from Charleroi, Belgium.	Passed to Fintown Railway.	

== See also ==
- Earl O'Neill
- Baron O'Neill
