= Fintown =

Village in County Donegal, Ireland

Fintown Baile na Finne
- Village
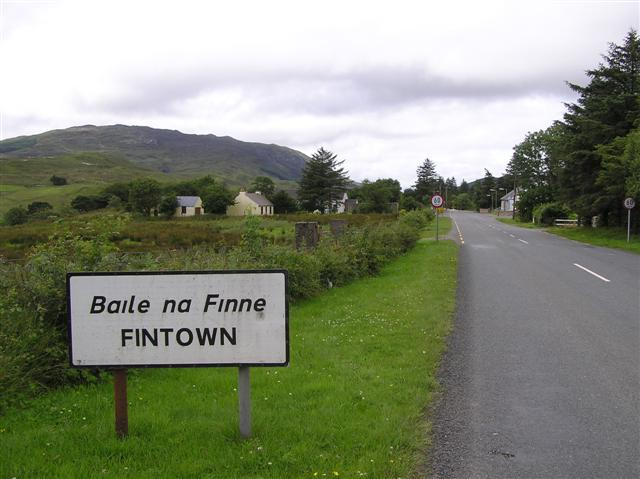
- Signage at the entrance to the village

- Location in Ireland
- Coordinates: 54°52′14″N 8°06′48″W
- Country: Ireland
- Province: Ulster
- County: County Donegal

Government
  - Dáil Éireann: Donegal
- Elevation: 169 m (554 ft)
- Baile na Finne is the only official name. The English name Fintown has no official status.

Fintown (officially known by its Irish name, Baile na Finne) is a small village and townland on the banks of Lough Finn in County Donegal, Ireland. It is within the Gaeltacht, an Irish-speaking area, in the west of the county. Overlooked by Aghla (589m, 1961 ft) and Screig Mountains, its main attraction is an Mhuc Dhubh, the Fintown Railway (Donegal's only operational narrow gauge railway), which runs along the length of Lough Finn. The village was named after a mythological woman, Fionngheal, who drowned in the lake after attempting to save her wounded brother Feargamhain.

== Demographics ==
As of the 2016 census, there were 88 people in the townland of Fintown, and 280 people in the electoral division of Baile na Finne (the surrounding hinterland). Of these, 59% were Irish speakers.

== Gallery ==
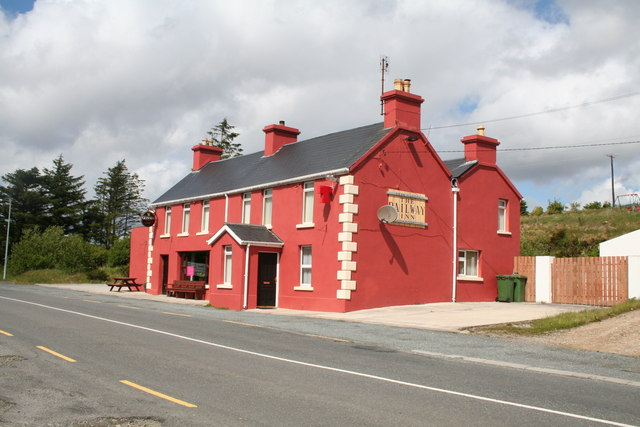
The Railway Inn

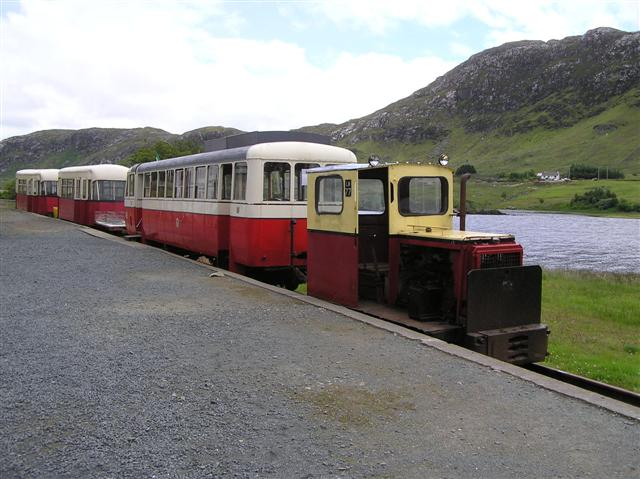
The Fintown Railway at Fintown station

== See also ==
- List of populated places in Ireland
