= Bellevue Park Railway =

Defunct recreational railway in Belfast, Northern Ireland

The Bellevue Park Railway, which closed in 1950, operated in Bellevue, Belfast.

== History ==
Bellevue Park was a popular recreational facility between the two world wars, providing gardens, ponds, amusements, refreshments, a zoo, and a 15 in (381 mm) gauge miniature railway for the entertainment of visitors. The Bellevue Park Railway, which received a new locomotive and carriages in 1933 from Blackpool, closed in 1950. The locomotive, a German-built 0-4-0 tender engine named 'Jean', was sold for scrap, but having been rescued by Sir William McAlpine eventually returned to its original railway, the Romney, Hythe and Dymchurch Railway in Kent, under its original name, 'The Bug'.
