= Lough Finn =

Lake in County Donegal, Ireland

- Loch Finne (Irish)
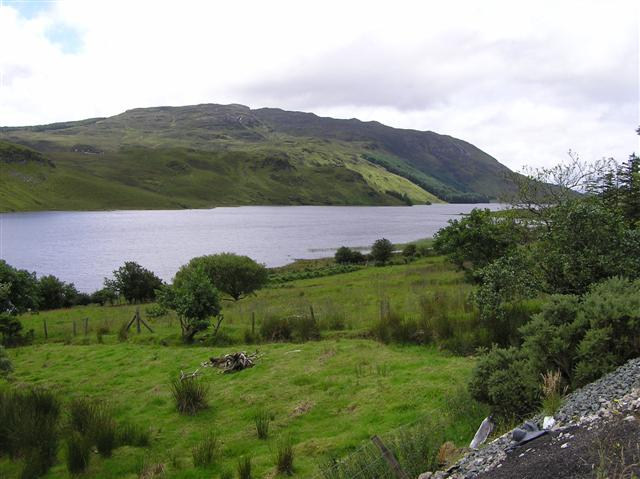

- Location in Ireland
- Location: County Donegal, Ireland
- Coordinates: 54.864°N 8.131°W
- Catchment area: 10.61 km^{2} (4.1 sq mi)
- Basin countries: Ireland
- Max. length: approx. 5 km (3.1 mi)
- Max. width: approx. 0.5 km (0.3 mi)
- Surface area: 1.15 km^{2} (0.44 sq mi)
- Surface elevation: 132 m (433 ft)
- Settlements: Fintown

Lough Finn (Irish: Loch Finne) is a freshwater lough (lake) in County Donegal, Ireland. The lough, along with its neighbouring village of Fintown, was named after a mythological woman, Finngeal, who drowned in the lake after attempting to save her wounded brother Feargamhain. The water from Lough Finn outflows into the River Finn.

== Gallery ==
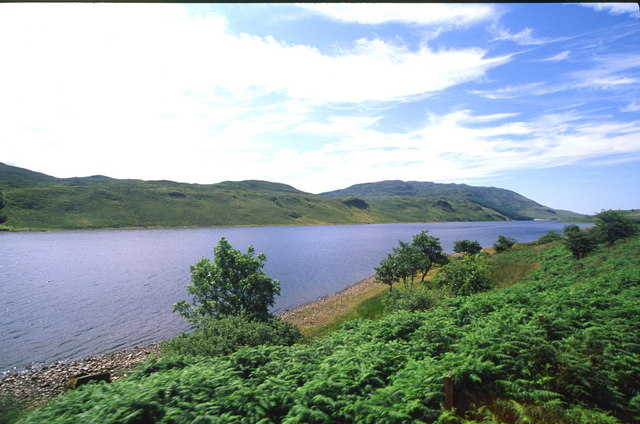
The lough, as seen from the nearby heritage railway.

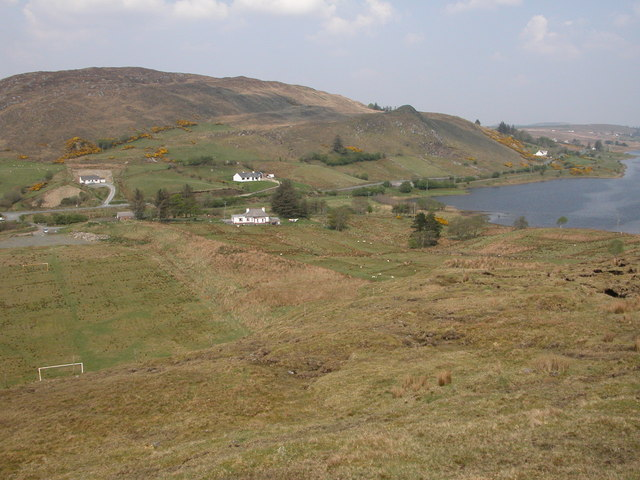
Looking down on the SW end of Lough Finn.

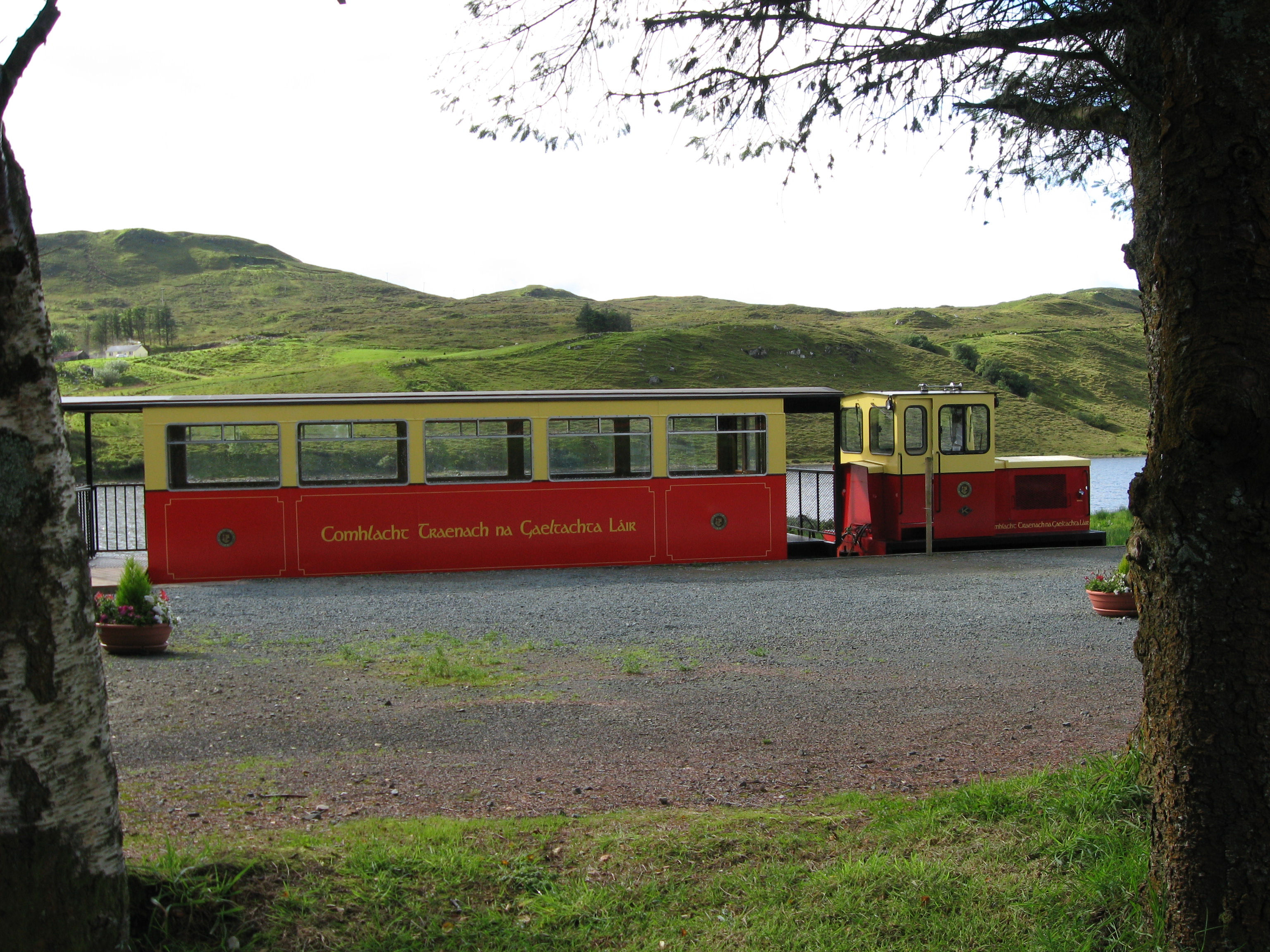
Fintown Railway on trackbed of CDR County Donegal Railways Joint Committee, next to Lough Finn with a train in the platform at Fintown station.

== See also ==
- List of loughs in Ireland
