= Nicolas Desmarest =

French geologist (1725–1815)

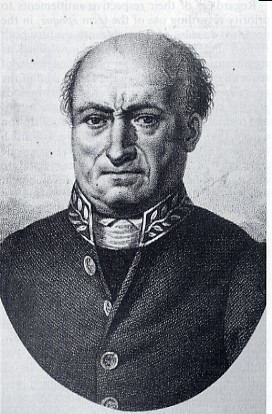
- Born: 16 September 1725; Soulaines-Dhuys, France
- Died: 20 September 1815 (aged 90); Paris, France
- Scientific career
- Fields: geology

Signature
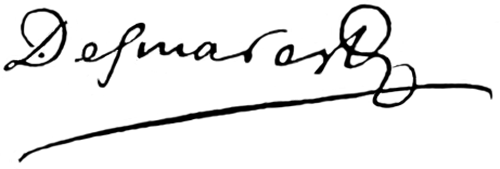

Nicolas Desmarest (French pronunciation: [nikɔla demaʁɛ]; 16 September 1725 – 20 September 1815) was a French geologist and contributor to the Encyclopédie ou Dictionnaire raisonné des sciences, des arts et des métiers, in particular, the multi-volume Géographie-physique.

Desmarest was born in Soulaines, in the department of Aube. Of humble parentage, he was educated at the College of the Oratorians of Troyes and Paris. Taking full advantage of the instruction he received, he was able to support himself by teaching, and to continue his studies independently. Buffon's Theory of the Earth interested him, and in 1753 he successfully competed for a prize by writing an essay on the ancient connection between England and France. This attracted much attention, and ultimately led to his being employed in studying and reporting on manufactures in different countries, and in 1788 to his appointment as inspector-general of the manufactures of France.

He utilized his journeys, travelling on foot, so as to add to his knowledge of the Earth's structure. In 1763 he made observations in Auvergne, recognizing that the prismatic basalts were old lava streams, comparing them with the columns of the Giant's Causeway in Ireland, and referring them to the operations of extinct volcanoes. It was not, however, until 1774, that he published an essay on the subject, accompanied by a geological map, having meanwhile on several occasions revisited the district. He then pointed out the succession of volcanic outbursts and the changes the rocks had undergone through weathering and erosion. As remarked by Sir Archibald Geikie, the doctrine of the origin of valleys by the erosive action of the streams which flow through them was first clearly taught by Desmarest.

An enlarged and improved edition of his map of the volcanic region of Auvergne was published after his death, in 1823, by his son Anselme Gaëtan Desmarest (1784-1838), who was distinguished as a zoologist, and author of memoirs on recent and fossil crustaceans. He died in Paris.
