= Foyle Valley Railway Museum =

Museum in Northern Ireland

Coordinates: 54.99197°N 7.321529°W

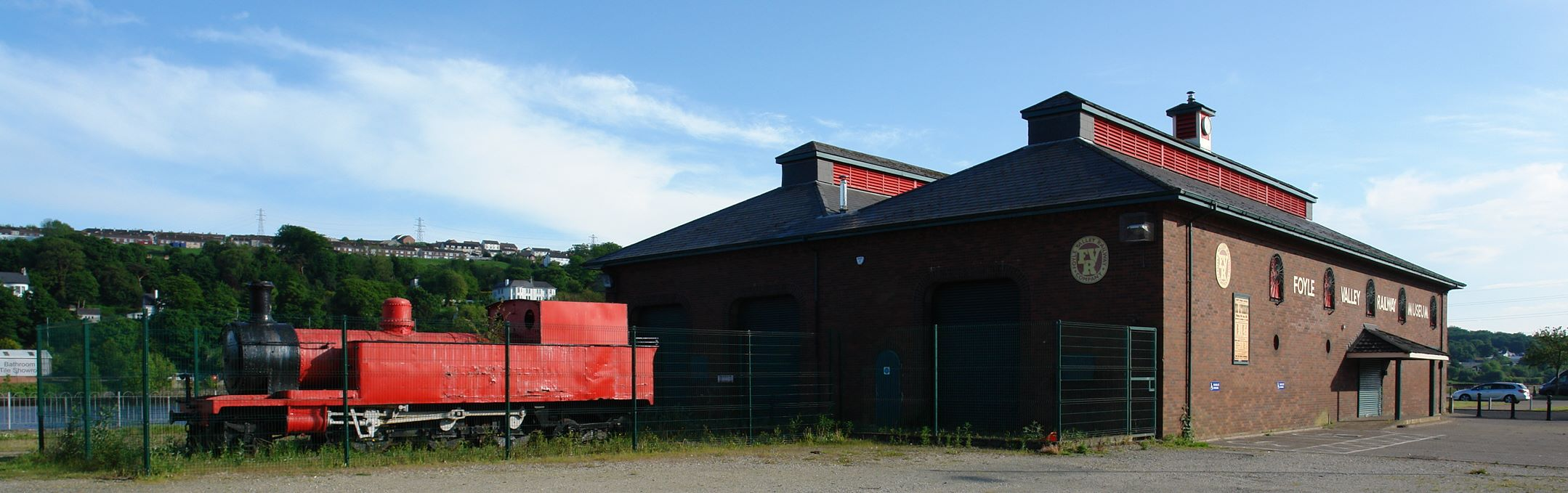
The exterior of the museum in 2016

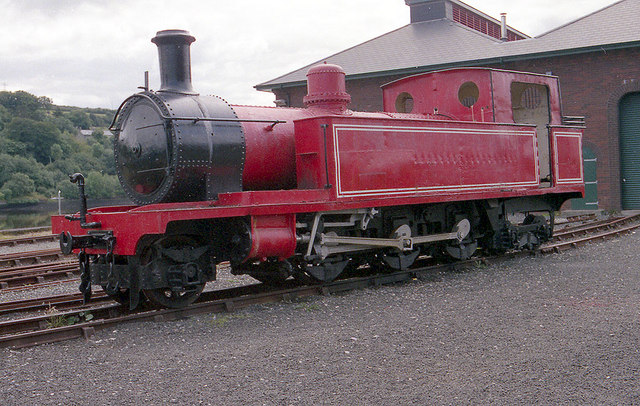
County Donegal Railways Joint Committee locomotive on the railway tracks, 1995

Foyle Valley Railway Museum is a museum in Derry, Northern Ireland. It is run by the charity Destined and is dedicated to the history of narrow gauge railways in the surrounding area. A heritage railway named Foyle Valley Railway previously ran from the museum.

== History ==
=== Origin of the collection ===
After the last remaining line of the County Donegal Railways Joint Committee (CDRJC) closed in 1960, an American airline businessman named Dr Ralph Cox bought a large number of its assets, including many pieces of rolling stock. He had plans to use these for a heritage railway in New Jersey, but the high cost of shipping prevented anything from crossing the Atlantic. The rolling stock stayed in situ at Strabane, Letterkenny and Stranorlor where it was exposed to the effects of the weather and vandalism.

=== First museum and railway ===
In 1970, the North West of Ireland Railway Society (NWIRS) was set up to acquire and preserve what remained of Dr Cox's collection. It leased Victoria Road station in June 1972 and opened it as a museum in March of the following year. Between August and November of 1974, five pieces of rolling stock were moved to the museum (nos. 6, 12, 14, 18 and 19). A short section of track was relaid and the two railcars (nos. 12 and 18) began running in May 1975. This was given the name Foyle Valley Railway and there were plans to extend it along the CDRJC trackbed to as far as Prehen Park, however it only ever reached a length of 300 metres (330 yd). In December 1978, a retailer bought the station site and the museum was forced to hastily close. The rolling stock found a new temporary home at Shane's Castle Railway.

=== Second museum and railway ===
In 1986, Derry City Council constructed a new purpose-built building for the museum. This was on the site of a former goods yard of the Great Northern Railway (GNR) near what was previously Foyle Road station. The NWIRS rolling stock was returned to Derry and was joined by a few more items which had been at Strabane. Track for the Foyle Valley Railway was laid again, this time along the GNR trackbed towards Carrigans. The two railcars resumed running along the railway in 1993, which reached a final length of 2 miles 20 chains (3.6 km).

In October 2000, the council made a decision to take over the running of the museum and railway from the NWIRS due to health and safety concerns. The running of trains was ceased and the two parties entered into a public dispute. The museum was then council-run, albeit with some periods of closure, until the charity Destined took out a 50-year lease on the building in 2016. After being renovated, the museum reopened in 2023.

== Exhibits ==
The museum contains several preserved railway vehicles, most of which are from the former County Donegal Railways Joint Committee, arranged around a mock station platform. Costumed tour guides are available to show visitors around.

Railway vehicles at the Foyle Valley Railway
Number	Type	Build date	Original operator	Notes
2	4wDM diesel shunter	1956	Motor Rail	
4	2-6-4T steam locomotive	1907	CDRJC	Stored outside. Originally no. 16 Donegal but renamed and renumbered to no. 4 Meenglas in 1937. Superheated in 1926.
6	2-6-4T steam locomotive	1907	CDRJC	Originally no. 18 Killybegs but renamed and renumbered to no. 6 Columbkille in 1937. Superheated in 1925.
12	diesel railcar	1934	CDRJC	Built by the GNR at Dundalk. Worked the last train from Killybegs on 31 December 1959.
14	composite carriage	1893	CDRJC	Contains five compartments, of which two were originally first class. Converted to all third class in 1937.
18	diesel railcar	1885	CDRJC	Built by the GNR at Dundalk. Burnt out in 1949 but was repaired.
19	goods van	1881	CDRJC	Adapted with vacuum breaks for towing behind the diesel railcars.
30	third class carriage	1901	LLSR	Only known surviving Londonderry and Lough Swilly Railway Carriage.
?	hand-worked crane	?	LLSR	

Former vehicle
Number	Type	Build date	Original operator	Notes
18	diesel railcar	1885	CDRJC	Built by the GNR at Dundalk. Burnt out in 1949 but was repaired. Now at Fintown Railway.

== Future ==
Destined plans to lease more land to the south of the current site to use as a community garden. There are tentative plans to rebuild some of the railway to link this with the museum.

== See also ==
- List of heritage railways in Northern Ireland
