= Giant's Causeway and Bushmills Railway =

Heritage railway in Northern Ireland

Coordinates: 55.210°N 6.535°W

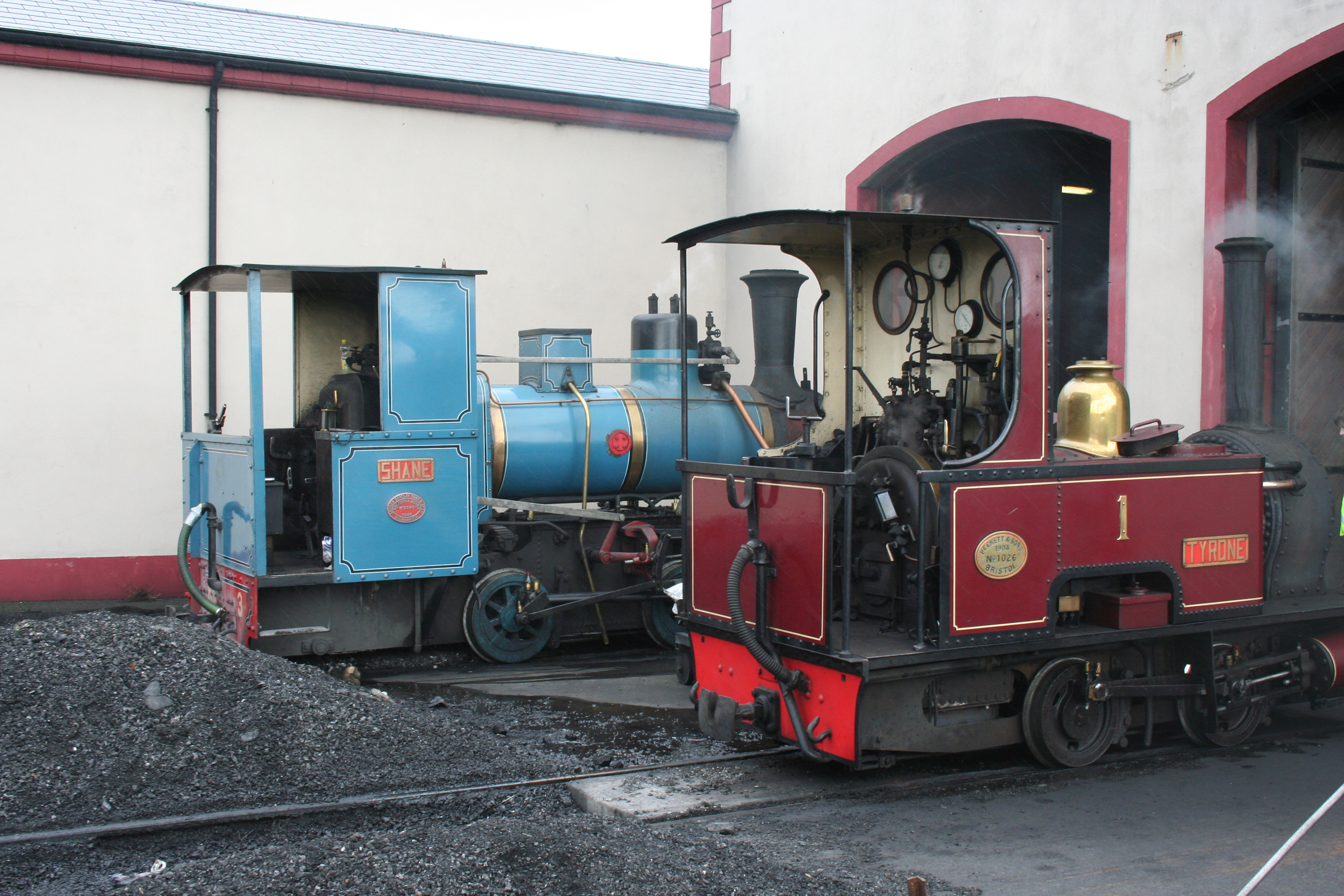
Locomotives of the railway: Shane and Tyrone

The Giant's Causeway and Bushmills Railway (GC&BR) is a 3 ft (914 mm) narrow gauge heritage railway operating between the Giant's Causeway and Bushmills on the coast of County Antrim, Northern Ireland. The line is two miles (three kilometres) long.

== History ==
=== Original line ===
The Giant's Causeway Tramway, operated by the Giant's Causeway, Portrush and Bush Valley Railway & Tramway Company Ltd, was a pioneering 3 ft (914 mm) narrow gauge electric railway operating between Portrush and the Giant's Causeway. 9 1/4 miles (15 kilometres) long, it was hailed at its opening as "the first long electric tramway in the world". Promoted by W.A. Traill it was powered by hydro-electricity from an elevated third rail, although steam tram engines were also used in its earlier years, and the power supply was converted to an overhead wire in 1899. It opened to Bushmills in 1883, the extension from there to the Causeway following on 1 July 1887. The line closed at the end of the 1949 season on Friday 30 September, and was subsequently dismantled.

=== New line ===
The new railway uses equipment originally assembled by Lord O’Neill for a tourist line at Shane's Castle, Country Antrim, which closed in 1994. The idea of using that material to revive part of the Tramway was largely conceived and promoted by David Laing. The Giant's Causeway and Bushmills Railway Company is a not-for-profit organisation with charitable status. The clearing of the trackbed commenced at the end of 1999 and the railway carried its first passengers at Easter 2002.

On 10 July 2010, the railway took delivery of a specially customised four-coach diesel multiple unit (DMU), capable of accommodating up to 90 passengers. Manufactured by Severn Lamb UK Ltd., it was designed to enhance the visitor experience to the North Antrim Coast and to recreate, in so far as was possible, the passenger experience of the original hydro-electric tram. Commissioning of the new rolling stock by the manufacturers began on Monday 12 July with the inaugural journey occurring three days later. The DMU is powered by a Kubota V3600-E3 engine and shares the line with the previous steam rolling stock. All vehicles run on bogies. The powered vehicle is on the Causeway side and is shorter (four windows) than the three trailers (five windows).

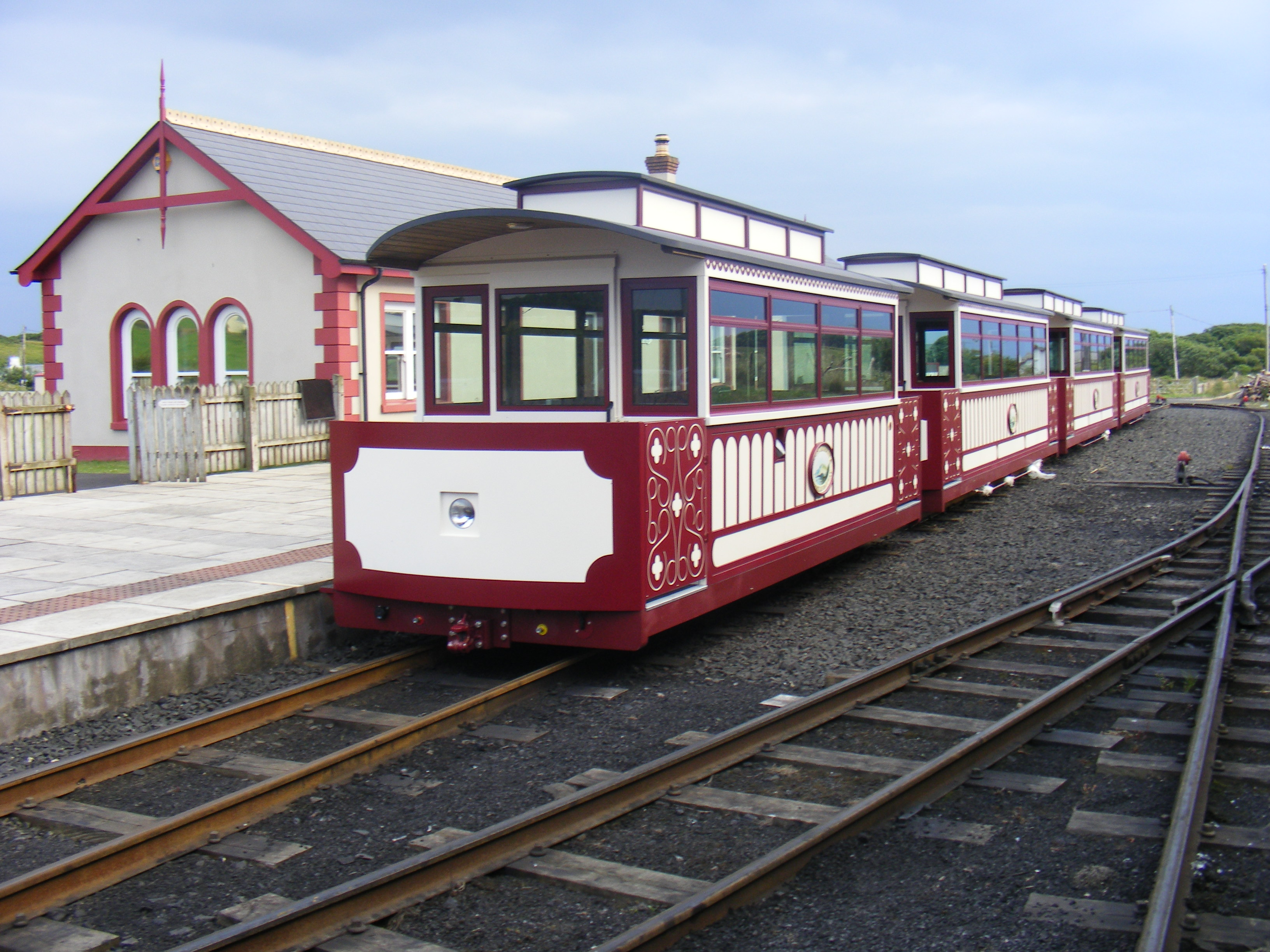

== Route ==
The upper station, just below the Causeway Hotel, has a single platform, and passenger, locomotive and carriage facilities, all built in the traditional style of the line. Trains depart towards Bushfoot Strand down a gradient which is sufficient to make the engines "bark" on their return. It then follows the ancient sand dune system until it meets the River Bush, where a newly installed bridge carries the line across. Just before the bridge is a passing loop, which is not normally used. Crossing Bushfoot Golf Course to meet Ballaghmore Road (which leads from Bushmills to Portballintrae) the line turns, bringing it parallel to that road, which it follows to the lower terminus situated at the junction of the Portrush to Bushmills road. The GC&BR Bushmills station is a single platform with no buildings. Alongside the line there is both a cycle track (National Cycle Network 93) and a footpath.

== Locomotives and coaches ==
No.	Name	Wheel Arr.	Cylinders	Builder	Works No.	Date Built	Notes.
1	Tyrone	0-4-0T	2, OC	Peckett and Sons	1026	1904	Ex-British Aluminium Co. No. 1, Larne
2	Rory	4wDH		The Motor Rail & Tramcar Co.	102T016	1976	Ex-Blue Circle Cement
3	Shane	0-4-0WT	2, OC	Andrew Barclay Sons & Co.	2265	1949	Ex-Bord na Móna No. 3 (later No. 45), Clonsast, built as turf (peat)-burner

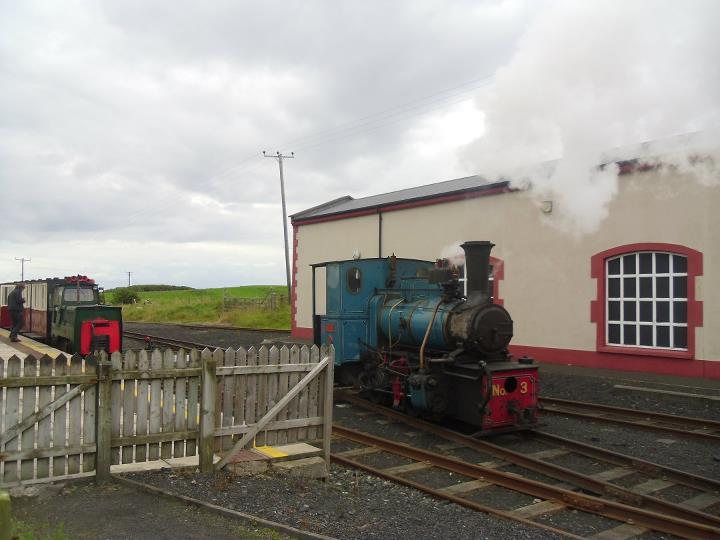
The two locomotives Rory and Shane at Giant's Causeway railway station in 2011

The line has eight 4-wheel coaches

== See also ==
- List of heritage railways in Northern Ireland
- List of narrow-gauge railways in Ireland
- Rail transport in Ireland

== Other reading ==
- Cliff, Thomas (2002). The Narrow Gauge in Britain & Ireland. Penryn: Atlantic. ISBN 1-902827-05-8.
- Johnson, Stephen (1997). Johnson's Atlas & Gazetteer of the Railways of Ireland. Leicester: Midland Publishing. ISBN 1-85780-044-3.
