= Giant's Causeway Tramway =

Irish electric railway

Coordinates: 55.2088°N 6.5786°W

Giant's Causeway, Portrush and Bush Valley Railway and Tramways
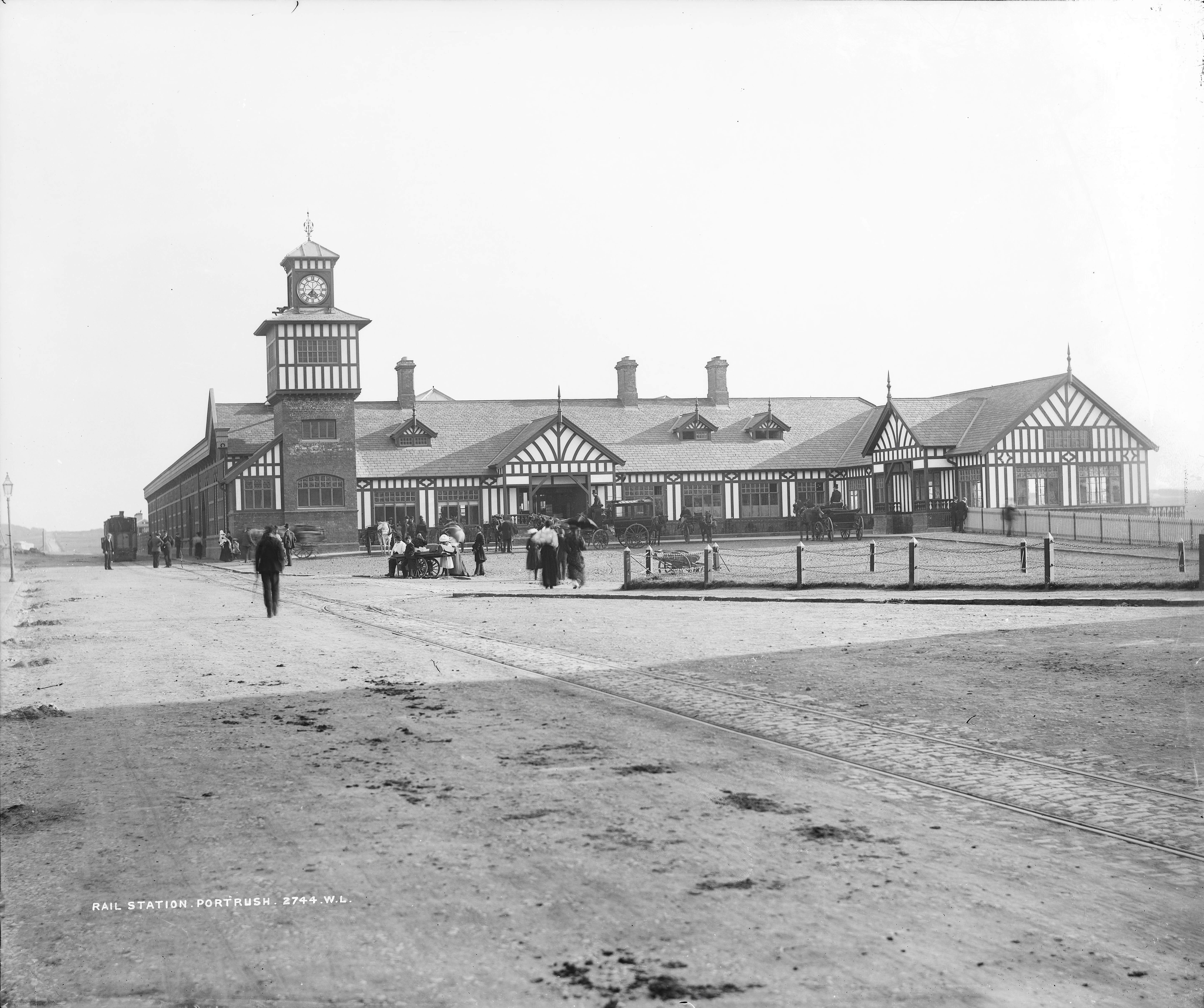
- The terminus beside Portrush Railway Station, 1890s

Overview
- Dates of operation: 1883–1949

Technical
- Track gauge: 3 ft (914 mm)
- Length: 9 1/4 miles (14.9 km)

The Giant's Causeway Tramway, operated by the Giant's Causeway, Portrush and Bush Valley Railway and Tramways Company, was a pioneering 3 ft (914 mm) narrow gauge electric railway operating between Portrush and the Giant's Causeway on the coast of County Antrim, Northern Ireland. The line, 9 1/4 miles (14.9 km) long, was hailed at its opening as "the first long electric tramway in the world". The Giant's Causeway and Bushmills Railway today operates diesel and steam tourist trains over part of the Tramway's former course.

== History ==
Giants' Causeway, Portrush and Bush Valley Railway and Tramways Act 1880
- Act of Parliament
- Parliament of the United Kingdom
- Long title: An Act to authorise the construction of a Railway and Tramways in the county of Antrim, to be called "The Giants' Causeway, Portrush, and Bush Valley Railway and Tramways;" and for other purposes.
- Citation: 43 & 44 Vict. c. cxcvii

Dates
- Royal assent: 26 August 1880

Text of statute as originally enacted

Giant's Causeway, Portrush and Bush Valley Railway and Tramways Act 1885
- Act of Parliament
- Parliament of the United Kingdom
- Long title: An Act to enable the Giant's Causeway Portrush and Bush Valley Railway and Tramways Company to abandon part of their authorised Railway and to construct a new Railway instead thereof; to confer further powers upon that Company for completing the remainder of their authorised Undertaking; to authorise the abandonment of the Glenariff Railway and Pier; and for other purposes.
- Citation: 48 & 49 Vict. c. clxvi

Dates
- Royal assent: 6 August 1885

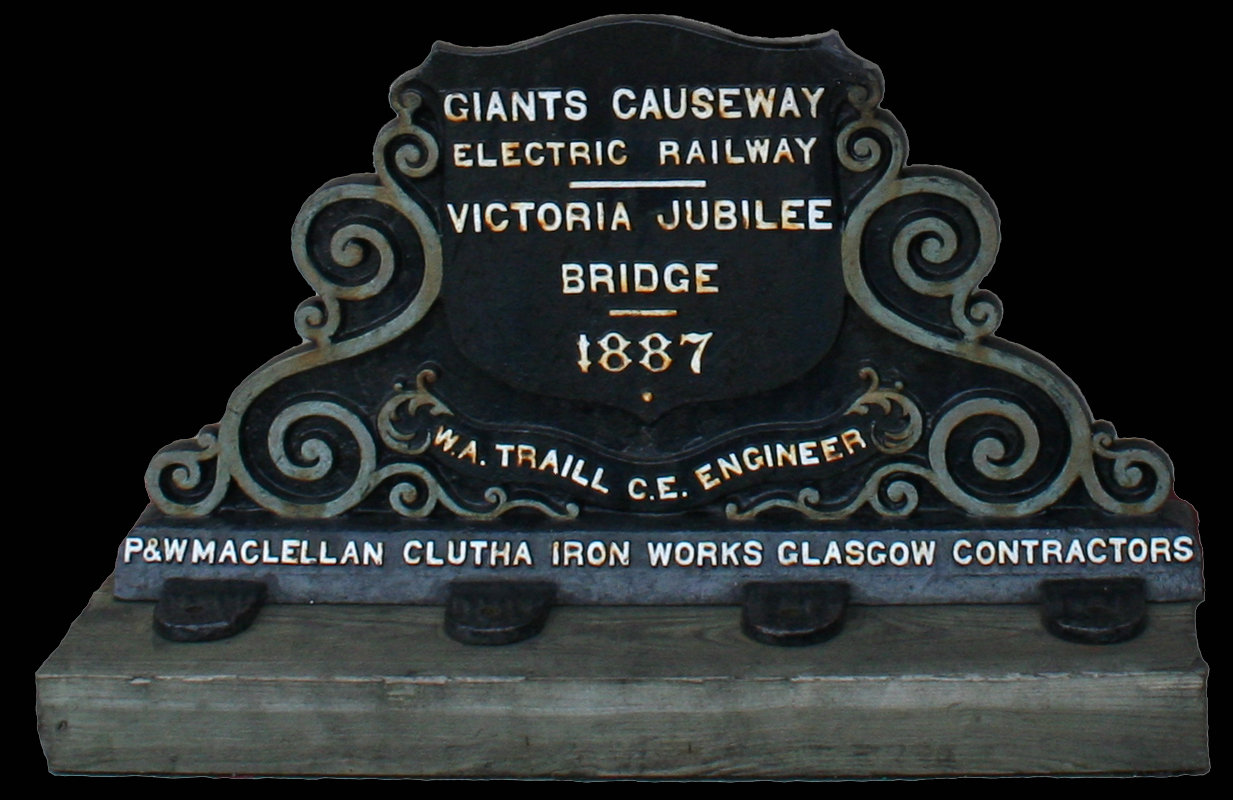
Plaque from Electric Railway

The Giant's Causeway Tramway came about through the enthusiasm of William Atcheson Traill, M.A.Ing., of Ballylough (1844–1934), together with his brother Dr Anthony Traill, who between them undertook most of the promotion and fundraising for the line. W. A. Traill was a man with not only an interest in railways but also a keen interest in technological developments in engineering. The act of Parliament incorporating 'The Giant's Causeway, Portrush, and Bush Valley Railway and Tramways Company', the Giants' Causeway, Portrush and Bush Valley Railway and Tramways Act 1880 (43 & 44 Vict. c. cxcvii) was passed on 26 August 1880. It authorised a tramway from Portrush to Bushmills and a railway from there to join the Ballycastle Railway (also 3 ft. gauge) at Dervock. The only section of the railway ever built was a short spur at Dervock. The Dervock section was abandoned by the Giant's Causeway, Portrush and Bush Valley Railway and Tramways Act 1885 (48 & 49 Vict. c. clxvi), which authorised extension from Bushmills to the Causeway.

At the Berlin Trade Fair of 1879 Siemens was demonstrating the first railway electrification system and it was that which led the British branch of the firm to be commissioned to incorporate this new technology into the Giant's Causeway Tramway venture. Sir William Siemens (1823–83) was briefly a director, and Siemens Brothers of London were appointed electrical engineers to the company, their representative being Dr Edward Hopkinson, who later went on to work on the Bessbrook and Newry Tramway and the City and South London Railway. Surveying and civil engineering work was carried out by Edward Price, son of the eminent Irish civil engineer James Price.

The line was the world's first to be powered by hydroelectricity, something that was later developed at Bessbrook and in Switzerland. Traill built a generating station at Walkmill Falls (24 feet (7.3 m)) head), near Bushmills, installing 104 horsepower (78 kW) Alcott water turbines to produce up to 250 volts at 100 amps of electrical power for his line. Later 160 horsepower (120 kW) turbines were installed. This building, although without its equipment, is still in existence. Because of legal problems over water rights, erection of the Walkmills turbines was delayed and when the first section of the tramway, from Portrush to Bushmills, was opened on 29 January 1883 some of the timetabled passenger traffic was handled by steam tram engines which were in any case necessary on the town section in Portrush where it was impossible to provide electric power since this was originally fed to the trains via an elevated third rail which ran alongside the line. Therefore, a 25 horsepower (19 kW) steam generator was installed at the Portrush depot (by 1936 replaced by a 550 volt diesel generator for the Portrush-Dunluce section). The ceremonial opening, using electric traction, took place on 28 September 1883 although a full scheduled electric service did not begin until 5 November and steam locomotives remained available for use until at least 1926. In 1897 17,797 miles (28,641 km) were steam operated and 4,721 miles (7,598 km) electric. In 1901 the figures were 7,423 miles (11,946 km) and 23,550 miles (37,900 km) respectively. Very little use of steam was made after 1916.

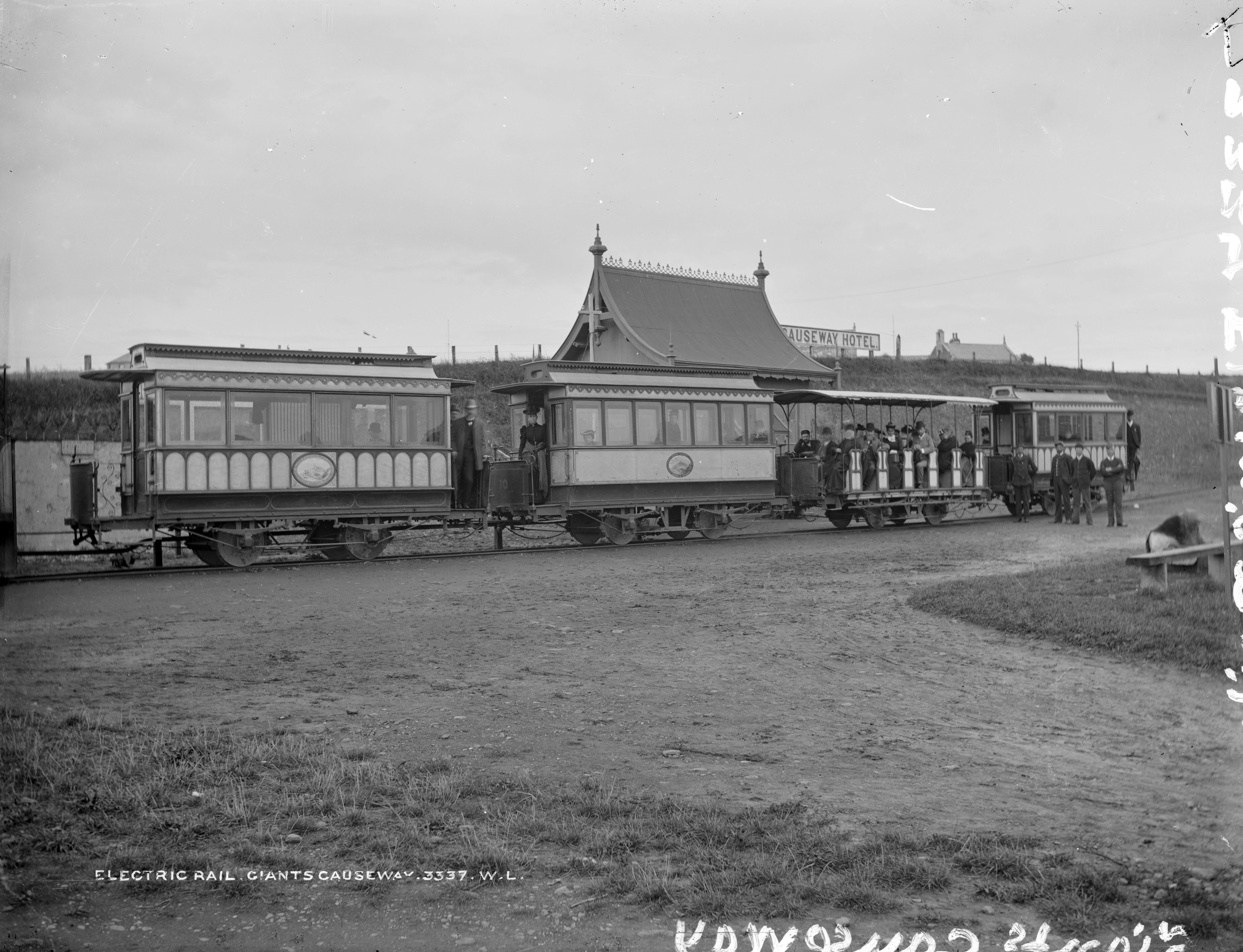
The Causeway Hotel terminus

The section from Bushmills to the Giant's Causeway opened on 1 July 1887. In 1895 a cyclist died of electric shock after coming into contact with the conductor rail. At the subsequent inquiry it was revealed that the line voltage varied from an average of 290 V up to 360 V, and the company agreed to a temporary reduction in the voltage, which limited the number of services that could be electrically worked. The third rail was replaced by overhead electric wire using side poles from 26 July 1899, apparently initially at 250 V. Voltage drop remained a problem and the tram was the subject of a song by the Irish Rovers which comments on its slow speed. The song was written by Hugh Speers of Bushmills. After upgrading of the Bushmills generating station in 1907 it was possible to produce a 550 V output.

Traill, a former geological surveyor, expected a considerable mineral traffic between quarries along the line and Portrush harbour, and there was originally a goods branch into the main square of Bushmills. However, this traffic fell away, the narrow gauge harbour branch being taken up when the Northern Counties station was opened in 1893, and for most of its life the line primarily served tourists visiting the Causeway. From 1925/26 the line was closed down during each winter.

Increased patronage, partly from military traffic, during World War II meant a brief revival of winter services, but receipts were becoming inadequate to support maintenance of the company's ageing assets, and the line did not reopen after the end of the 1949 season (last day of regular service 30 September 1949), and was subsequently dismantled.

The Giant's Causeway and Bushmills Railway was later constructed over the final two miles (3.2 km) of the tramway and carried its first passengers at Easter 2002.

== Route ==
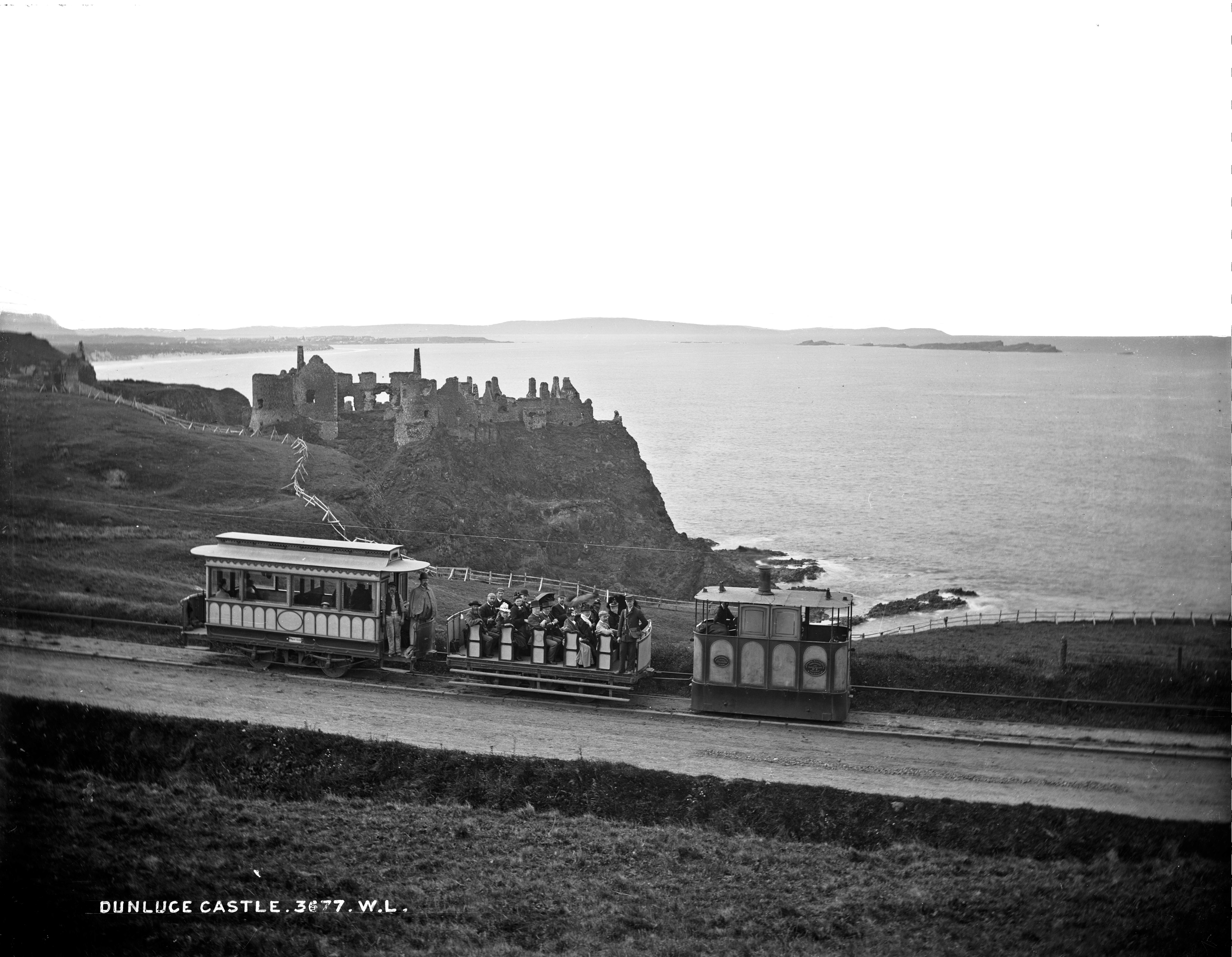
Dunluce Castle, 1890

The line was single track with passing loops at about 1 mile (1.6 km) intervals and was laid on sleepers apart from the first 3/4 mile (1.2 km) of street running through Portrush. The route began in Eglinton Street alongside Portrush railway station. After passing the main depot on the edge of the town, it took up a position on the seaward side of the coast road, passing the White Rocks, a 193 feet (59 m) summit at Clooney Hill and Dunluce Castle before reaching Bushmills station (the main building of which still stands). There was a subsidiary depot here. Beyond the crossing of the road to Portballintrae the line left the roadside; this is the section occupied by the present-day railway. The route crossed Bushfoot Golf Course and crossed the River Bush by the Victoria Jubilee Bridge, which had a lattice girder superstructure. This has been replaced, but some of the ornamental ironwork is preserved at the present Giant's Causeway station. From here the line passed by the dunes alongside Bushfoot Strand and climbed to the terminus just below the Causeway Hotel. The station facilities consisted of little more than a corrugated-iron shelter.

== Equipment ==
The original cars were built by the Midland Railway Carriage and Wagon Company and were later followed by five examples from GEC, each with two 20 horsepower (15 kW) British Thomson-Houston motors, and also a Peckham car. There were a maximum of six electric power cars owned at any one time, all being single-truck, single-deck vehicles with both enclosed and "toast rack" examples; typically these would haul several 4-wheel "toast rack" trailers, of which there were 15. There were four steam tram engines, ordered from Wilkinson of Wigan. They had vertical boilers, weighed 7 tons and burnt coke. No.2 was scrapped in 1899, No.1 converted to a ballast wagon in 1910 and Nos. 3 (Dunluce Castle) and 4 (Brian Boroihme) were sold in 1930 for the River Bann Navigation works near Portstewart.

In 1938 a final electric tram was added to the stock as number 24. This vehicle was formerly a double deck Dunfermline and District Tramways car which was both re-gauged and extensively modified to become a single decker with enclosed ends for the Giants Causeway route.

A power car and trailer are restored at the Ulster Folk and Transport Museum, Cultra and another power car is in the care of the National Transport Museum of Ireland at Howth.

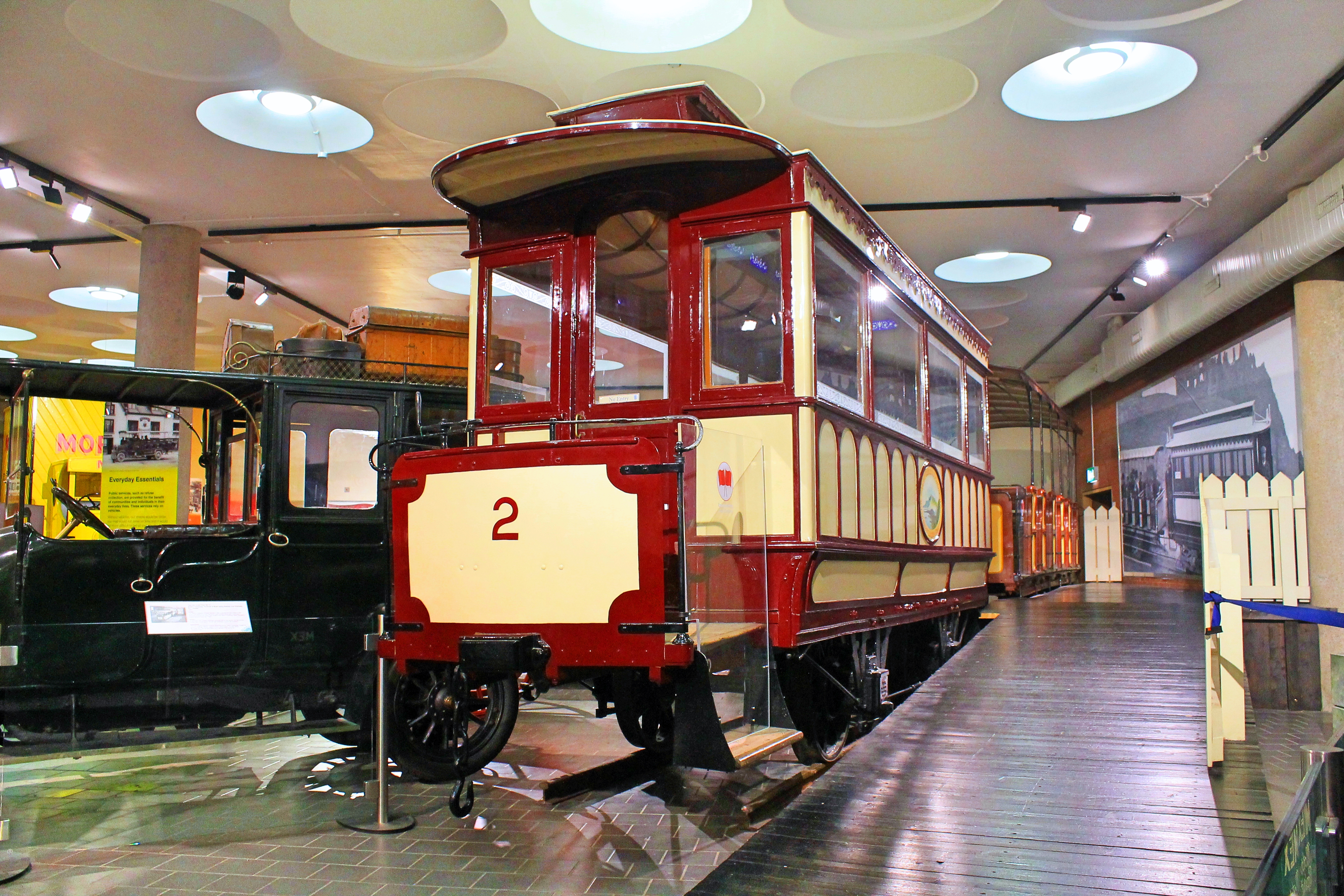
The power car at Cultra

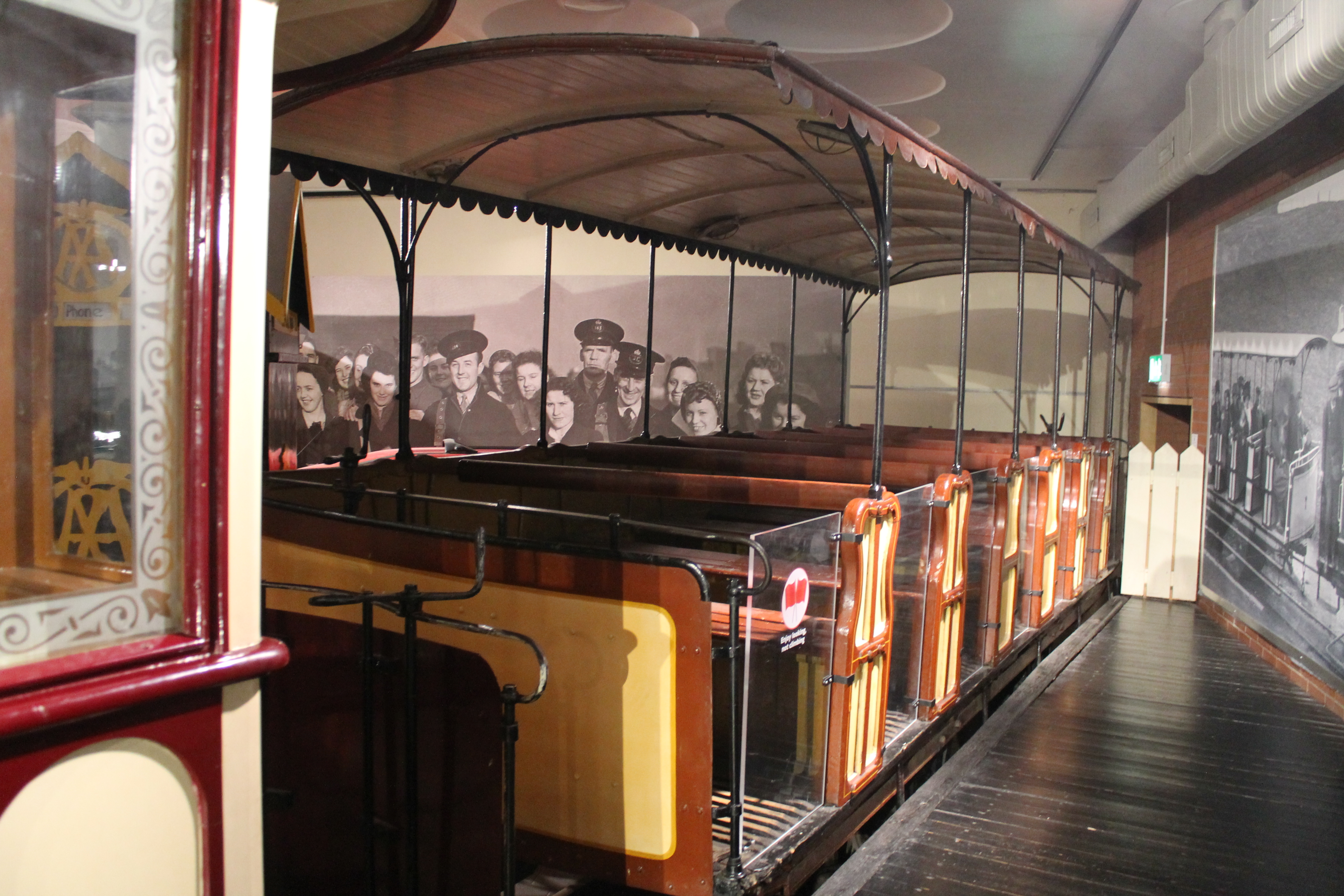
The trailer at Cultra

== See also ==
- History of rail transport in Ireland
- List of narrow-gauge railways in Ireland
