= Giant's Causeway =

Interlocking basalt columns in Northern Ireland

Giant's Causeway and Causeway Coast
- Clochán an Aifir/Clochán na bhFomhórach (Irish); Tha Giant's Causey (Ulster Scots)
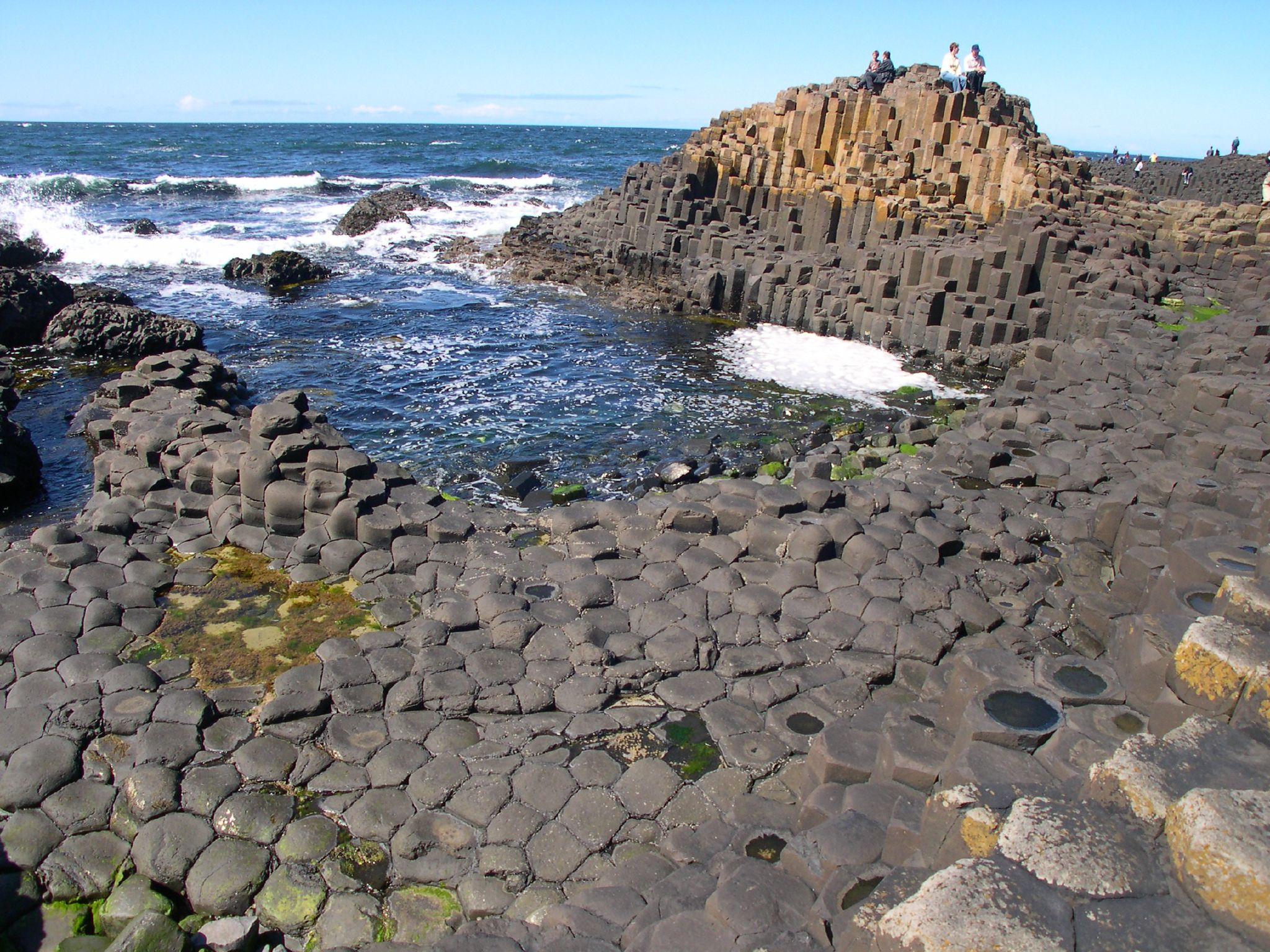
- The Giant's Causeway

- Location within Northern Ireland
- 55°14′27″N 6°30′42″W
- Location: County Antrim, Northern Ireland

UNESCO World Heritage Site
- Official name: The Giant's Causeway and Causeway Coast
- Type: Natural
- Criteria: (vii), (viii)
- Designated: 1986 (10th session)
- Reference no.: 369
- Region: Europe

The Giant's Causeway (Irish: Clochán an Aifir or Clochán na bhFomhórach) is an area of approximately 40,000 interlocking basalt columns, the result of an ancient volcanic fissure eruption, part of the North Atlantic Igneous Province active in the region during the Paleogene period. It is located in County Antrim on the north coast of Northern Ireland, about three miles (five kilometres) northeast of Bushmills.

It was declared a World Heritage Site by UNESCO in 1986 and a national nature reserve by the Department of the Environment for Northern Ireland in 1987. In a 2005 poll of Radio Times readers, the Giant's Causeway was named the fourth-greatest natural wonder in the United Kingdom.

The tops of the columns form stepping stones that lead from the cliff foot and disappear under the sea. Most of the columns are hexagonal, although some have between four and eight sides. The tallest are approximately 12 metres (39 ft) high, and the solidified lava in the cliffs is 28 metres (92 ft) thick in places.

Much of the Giant's Causeway and Causeway Coast World Heritage Site is owned and managed by the National Trust. It is one of the most popular tourist attractions in Northern Ireland, receiving nearly one million visitors in 2019. Access to the Giant's Causeway is free of charge: it is not necessary to go via the visitor centre that charges a fee. The remainder of the site is owned by the Crown Estate and several private landowners.

== Geology ==
Around 50 to 60 million years ago, during the Paleocene Epoch, Antrim was subject to intense volcanic activity, when highly fluid molten basalt intruded through chalk beds to form an extensive volcanic plateau. As the lava cooled, contraction occurred. Horizontal contraction fractured in a similar way to drying mud, with the cracks propagating down as the mass cooled, leaving pillarlike structures that also fractured horizontally into "biscuits". In many cases, the horizontal fracture resulted in a bottom face that is convex, while the upper face of the lower segment is concave, producing what are called "ball and socket" joints. The size of the columns was primarily determined by the speed at which lava cooled. The extensive fracture network produced the distinctive columns seen today. The basalts were originally part of a great volcanic plateau called the Thulean Plateau that formed during the Paleocene.

=== Geological heritage site ===
In respect of its key role in the development of volcanology as a geoscience discipline, and notably the origin of basalt, the Palaeocene rocks of the Giant's Causeway and Causeway Coast were included by the International Union of Geological Sciences (IUGS) in its assemblage of 100 "geological heritage sites" around the world in a listing published in October 2022.

== Legend ==
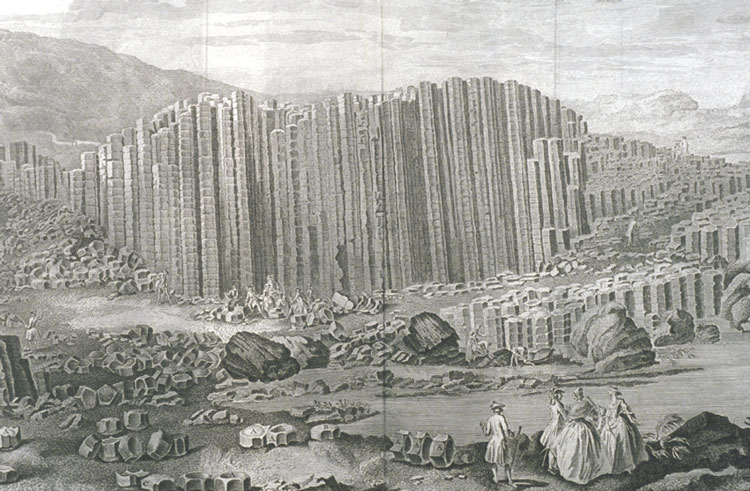
Engraving of Susanna Drury's A View of the Giant's Causeway: East Prospect, 1768

According to legend, a form of geomyth, the columns are the remains of a causeway built by a giant. The story goes that the Irish giant Fionn mac Cumhaill (Finn MacCool), from the Fenian Cycle of Gaelic mythology, was challenged to a fight by the Scottish giant Benandonner. Fionn accepted the challenge and built the causeway across the North Channel so that the two could meet. In one version of the story, Fionn defeats Benandonner. Another common telling of the story has Fionn hide from Benandonner when he realises that his foe is much bigger than he is. Fionn's wife, Sadhbh, disguises Fionn as a baby and tucks him in a cradle. When Benandonner sees the size of the "baby", he imagines that its father, Fionn, must be a giant among giants. He flees back to Scotland in fright, destroying the causeway behind him so that Fionn would be unable to chase him down. Across the sea, there are identical basalt columns (a part of the same ancient lava flow) at Fingal's Cave on the Scottish isle of Staffa, and it is possible that the story was influenced by this.

Overall, in Irish mythology, Fionn mac Cumhaill is not a giant, but a hero with supernatural abilities, contrary to what this particular legend may suggest. In Fairy and Folk Tales of the Irish Peasantry (1888), it is noted that, over time, "the pagan gods of Ireland [...] grew smaller and smaller in the popular imagination until they turned into the fairies; the pagan heroes grew bigger and bigger until they turned into the giants". There are no surviving pre-Christian stories about the Giant's Causeway, but it may have originally been associated with the Fomorians (Fomhóraigh); the Irish name Clochán na bhFomhóraigh or Clochán na bhFomhórach means "stepping stones of the Fomhóraigh". The Fomhóraigh are a race of mythological beings in Irish mythology who were sometimes described as giants and who may have originally been deities among a pre-Christian pantheon.

Letitia Elizabeth Landon comments on these mythological associations in her notes to "The Giant's Causeway", a poetical illustration to a painting by Thomas Mann Baynes.

== Tourism ==
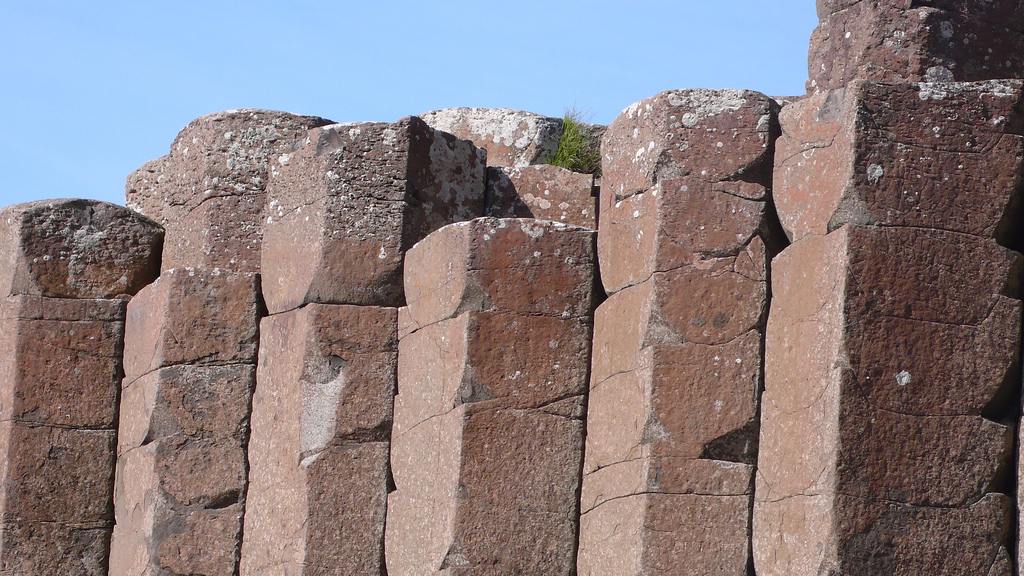
Red basaltic prisms

William King, Bishop of Derry visited the site in 1692. The existence of the causeway was announced to the wider world the following year by the presentation of a paper to the Royal Society from Sir Richard Bulkeley, a fellow of Trinity College, Dublin. The Giant's Causeway received international attention when Dublin artist Susanna Drury made watercolour paintings of it in 1739; they won Drury the first award presented by the Royal Dublin Society in 1740 and were engraved in 1743. In 1765, an entry on the causeway appeared in volume 12 of the French Encyclopédie, which was informed by the engravings of Drury's work; the engraving of the "East Prospect" appeared in a 1768 volume of plates published for the Encyclopédie. In the caption to the plates, French geologist Nicolas Desmarest suggested, for the first time in print, that such structures were volcanic in origin.

The site first became popular with tourists during the nineteenth century, particularly after the opening of the Giant's Causeway Tramway. Emperor Pedro II of Brazil, visited the site on 9 July 1877 as part of a largely unpublicised three-day visit to Ireland. Only after the National Trust took over its care in the 1960s were some of the vestiges of commercialism removed.

=== Visitor centre ===
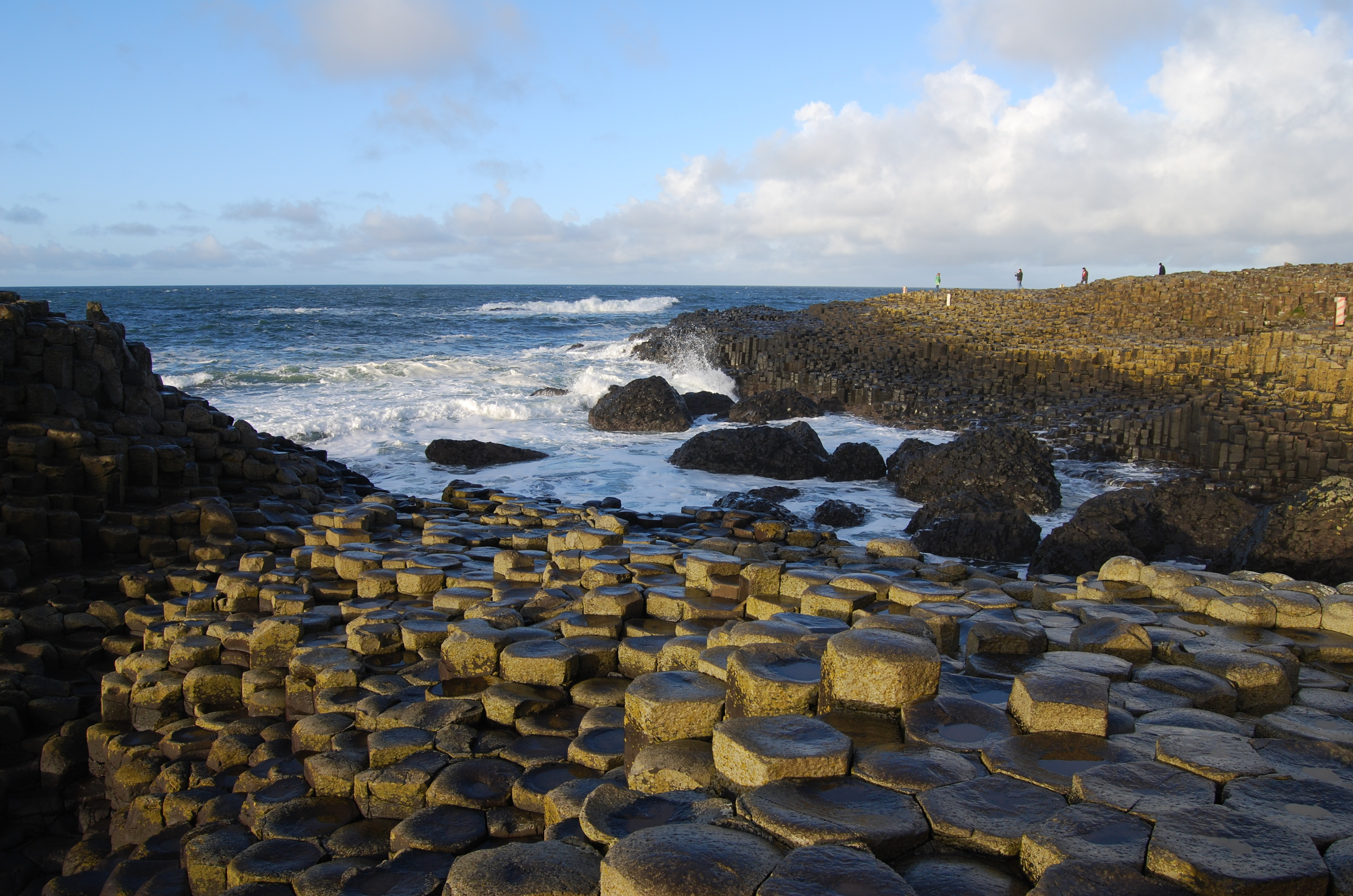
Giant's Causeway at sunset

The causeway was without a permanent visitor centre between 2000 and 2012, as the previous building, built in 1986, burned down in 2000. While preliminary approval was given for a publicly funded (but privately managed) development by then Environment Minister and Democratic Unionist Party (DUP) member Arlene Foster in 2007, the public funding was frozen due to a perceived conflict of interest between the proposed private developer and the DUP. Ultimately, the private developer dropped a legal challenge to the publicly funded plan, and the new visitor centre was officially opened by 2012. Its construction was funded by the National Trust, the Northern Ireland Tourist Board, the Heritage Lottery Fund and public donations. Since opening, the new visitor centre has garnered mixed reviews from those visiting the causeway, for its pricing, design, contents, and placement across the causeway walk descent. In 2018, the visitor centre was visited by 1,011,473 people.

There was some controversy regarding the content of some exhibits in the visitor centre, which refer to the Young Earth Creationist view of the age of the Earth. While these inclusions were welcomed by the chairman of the Northern Irish evangelical group, the Caleb Foundation, the National Trust stated that the inclusions formed only a small part of the exhibition and that the Trust "fully supports the scientific explanation for the creation of the stones 60 million years ago". An online campaign to remove creationist material was launched in 2012, and following this, the Trust carried out a review and concluded that they should be amended to have the scientific explanation on the origin of the causeway as their primary emphasis. Creationist explanations are still mentioned, but presented as a traditional belief of some religious communities rather than a competing explanation for the origin of the causeway.

== Notable features ==
Some of the structures in the area, having been subject to several million years of weathering, resemble objects, such as the Organ and Giant's Boot structures. Other features include many reddish, weathered low columns known as Giant's Eyes, created by the displacement of basalt boulders such as the Shepherd's Steps, the Honeycomb, the Giant's Harp, the Chimney Stacks, the Giant's Gate, and the Camel's Hump.

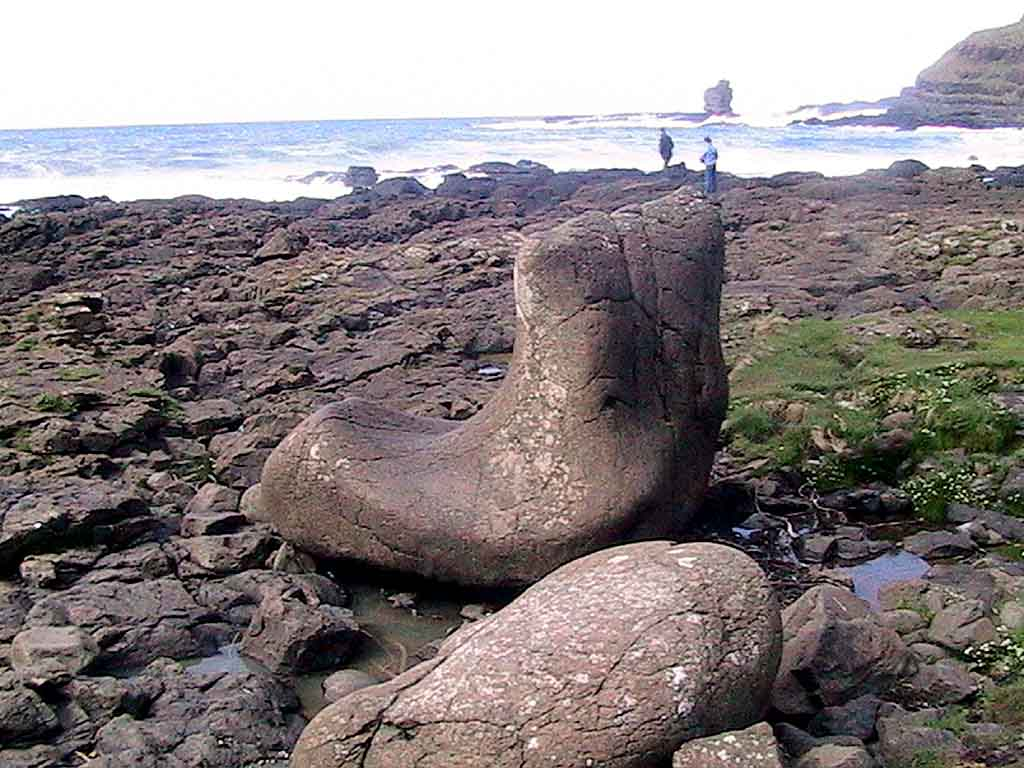
The Giant's Boot

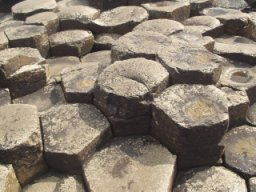
Basalt columns

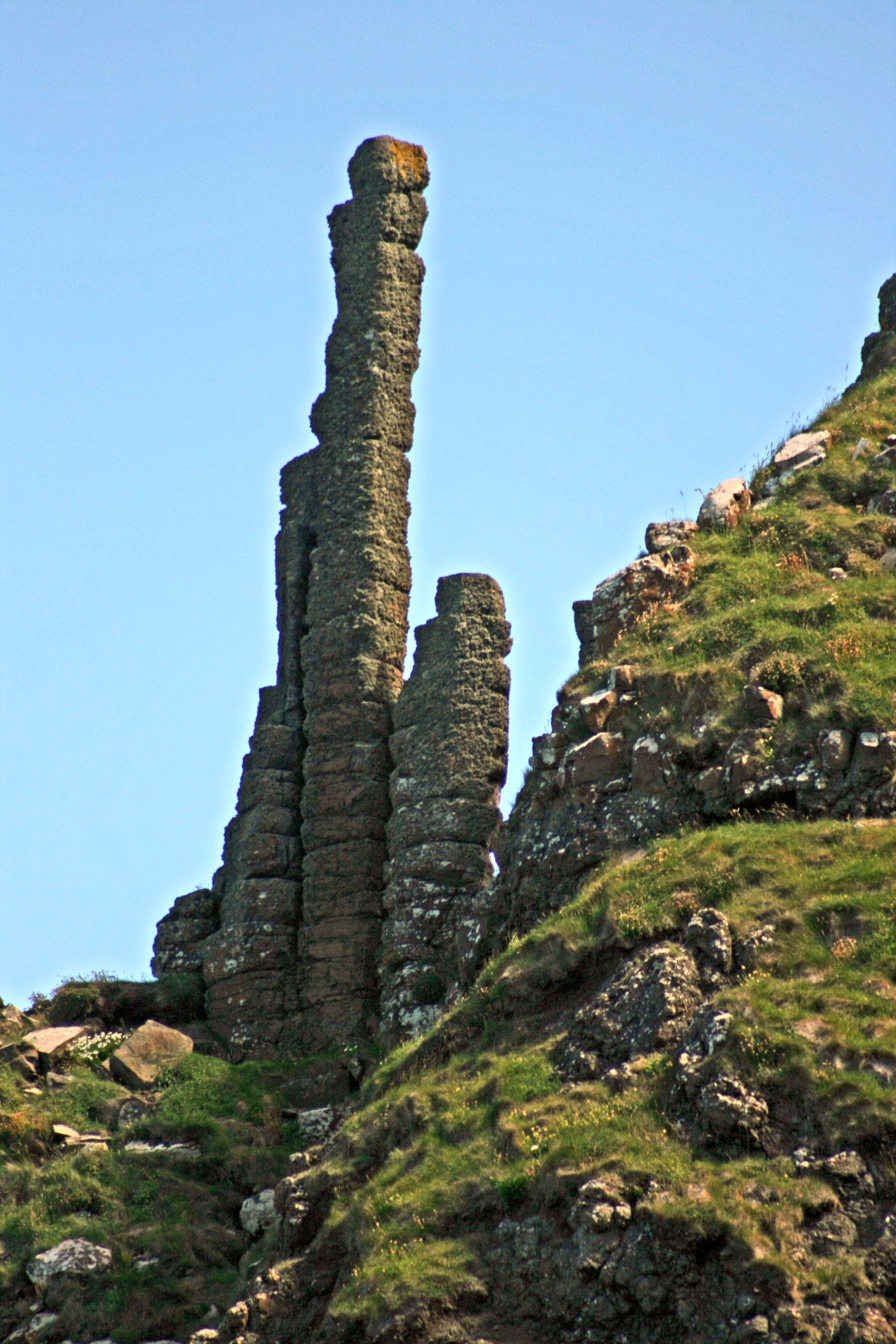
The Chimney Stacks

== Flora and fauna ==
The area is a haven for seabirds, such as fulmar, petrel, cormorant, shag, redshank, guillemot, and razorbill, while the weathered rock formations host numerous plant types, including sea spleenwort, hare's-foot trefoil, vernal squill, sea fescue, and frog orchid. A stromatolite colony was reportedly found at the Giant's Causeway in October 2011 – an unusual find, as stromatolites are more commonly found in warmer waters with higher saline content than that found at the causeway.

== Similar structures ==
Basalt columns are a common volcanic feature. They occur on many scales and with some variations in formation.

== Transport access ==
The Belfast-Derry railway line run by Northern Ireland Railways connects to Coleraine and along the Coleraine-Portrush branch line to Portrush. Locally, Ulsterbus provides connections to the railway stations. There is a scenic walk of seven miles (eleven kilometres) from Portrush alongside Dunluce Castle and the Giant's Causeway and Bushmills Railway.

== See also ==
- List of individual rocks
- List of tourist attractions in Ireland
- Tessellated pavement
