= Glenties =

Town in County Donegal, Ireland

Glenties Na Gleannta
- Town
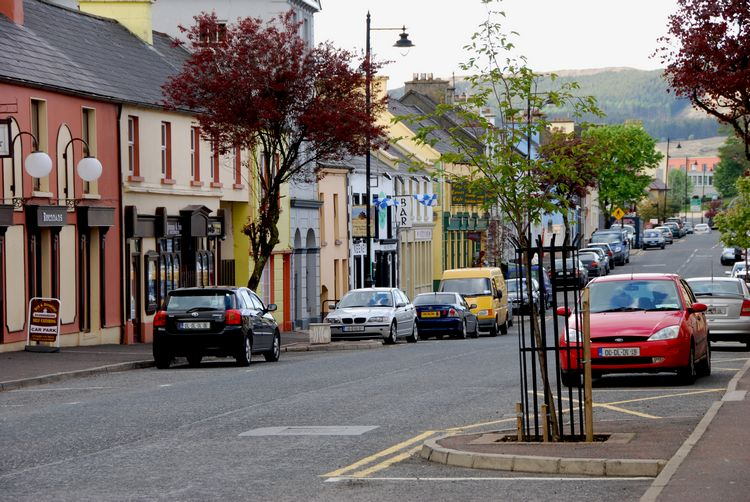
- Main street in Glenties

- Location in Ireland
- Coordinates: 54°47′51″N 8°16′57″W
- Country: Ireland
- Province: Ulster
- County: County Donegal

Government
  - Dáil Éireann: Donegal
  - EU Parliament: Midlands–North-West
- Elevation: 78 m (256 ft)

Population (2022)
  - Total: 927
- Time zone: UTC+0 (WET)
  - Summer (DST): UTC+1 (IST (WEST))
- Irish Grid Reference: G818944

Glenties (Irish: Na Gleannta, meaning 'the glens') is a town in County Donegal, Ireland. It is situated where two glens meet, north-west of the Bluestack Mountains, near the confluence of two rivers. Glenties is the largest centre of population in the parish of Iniskeel. Glenties has won the Irish Tidy Towns Competition five times in 1958, 1959, 1960, 1962 and 1995. As of the 2022 census, the population was 927.

== History ==
Evidence of early settlement in the area is given by the many dolmens, standing stones and earthen ringforts dating from the Bronze Age. The area became part of the baronies of Boylagh and Bannagh in 1609, which was granted to Scottish undertakers as part of the Ulster Plantation.

Glenties was a regular stopping point on the road between the established towns of Ballybofey and Killybegs, and grew from this in the 17th and 18th centuries. The town was developed as a summer home for the Marquess Conyngham in the 1820s, because of its good hunting and fishing areas. The court house and market house were built in 1843. The Bank of Ireland building was completed in 1880.

=== Famine era ===
A workhouse was built, in 1846 during the Great Famine, at the site of the current comprehensive school, serving the greater Inniskeel area. A 40-bed fever hospital was later added to care for the sick and dying. The landlord, the Marquis of Conyngham, decided to halve the population of the town in 1847, faced with the rising costs of the workhouse. Only those who could show title to their land as rent payers were allowed to remain. The rest were given an option of going to America on a ship provided or entering the Workhouse in Glenties. Over 40,000 people died or emigrated from County Donegal between the years 1841 and 1851.

=== 20th century ===
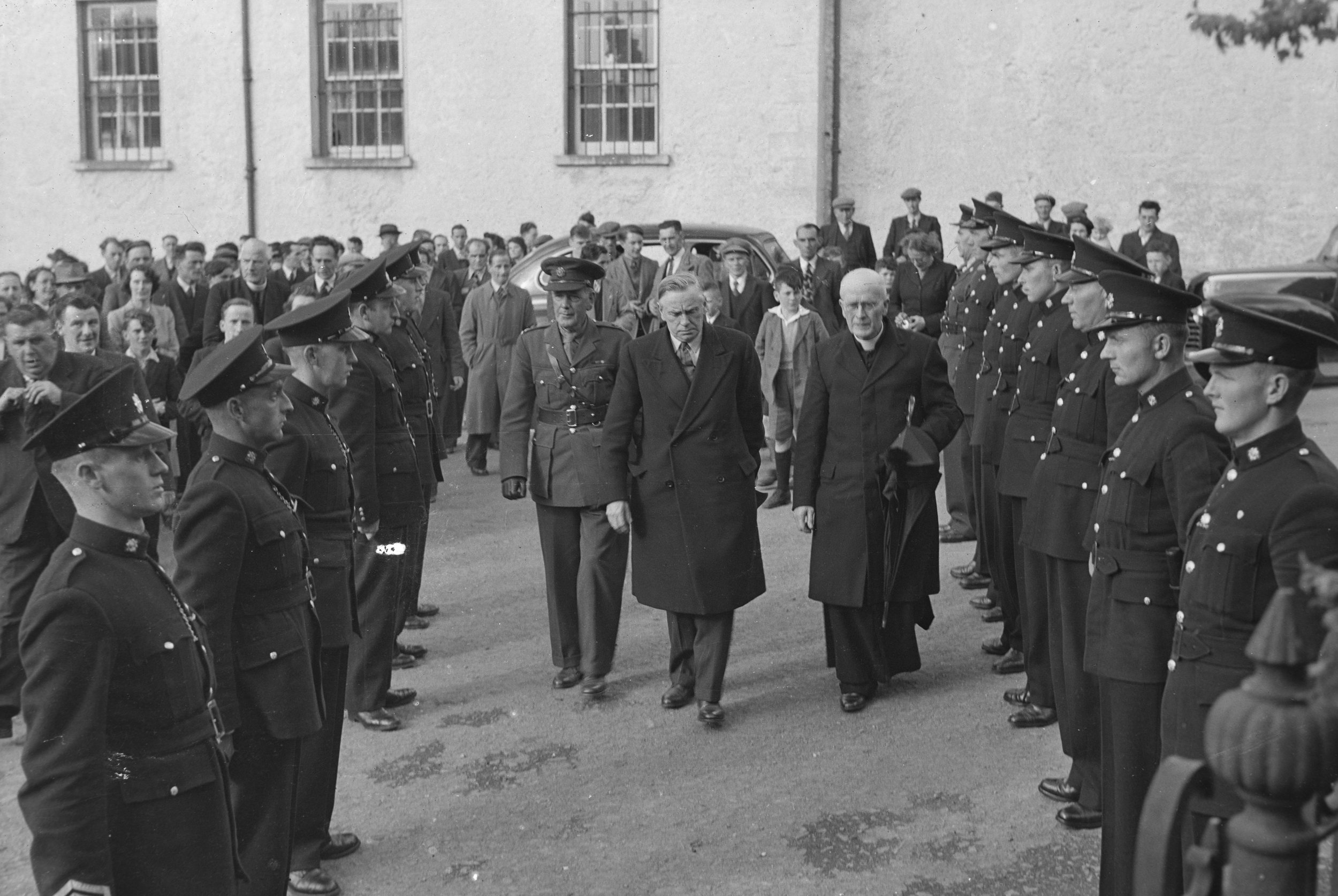
Taoiseach John A. Costello inspects ranks of An Gárda Síochána in Glenties during the 1951 election campaign

The railway was completed in 1895 from Ballybofey. In 1903 a local water scheme was established, to be replaced in 1925 by the current Lough Anna supply. In 1932 electricity was first generated locally in the town. The rural electrification scheme reached the area in the 1950s.

Glenties Royal Irish Constabulary (RIC) barracks was attacked on several occasions, during the War of Independence, in 1920 and 1921. On 29 June 1921, the Irish Republican Army ambushed a group of Black and Tans who were on their way to Ardara at Kilraine, resulting in the death of a Constable Devine.

Two National Army soldiers were killed at Lacklea in 1922 by Irish Republican Army forces, during the Irish Civil War.

In January 1944, a British RAF Sunderland Mark III flying boat crashed in the Croaghs area of the Bluestack Mountains, outside of Glenties, killing seven of its 12-man crew.

Brendan Behan spent more than two months with his wife on holiday in Glenties, starting in the third week of May 1960, and staying at the Highlands Hotel. During their stay, on Sunday 24 July, the hotel was raided by Gardaí and the hotelier charged with a breach of licensing laws (the raid came more than three hours after closing time). The case was dismissed when it was explained that the event had been taking place in a private room where Behan was doing "some of his literary work". Other events, documented by the Donegal Democrat, included Behan attending an Irish Countrywomen's Association dance and he and his wife being "guest artistes" at a meeting of the Ardara and Glenties branch of Comhaltas Ceoltóirí Éireann.

Glenties was the first townland in County Donegal to provide cable television to the local area. In 1976 "Glenties Community Piped TV Co-op" was established which brought cable television to Glenties and the surrounding area, enabling viewers to enjoy multi-channel television from Northern Ireland via BBC One, BBC Two, Ulster Television and from 1982 Channel Four along with the national RTE channels.

In April 2006, IRA informer Denis Donaldson was shot dead by the Real IRA at a remote cottage near Derryloaghan, 8 km from Glenties.

=== Bord na Móna ===
Bord na Móna bought 1,200 acres (490 ha) of bog in 1937 to be drained and cut for peat. By 1943 a railway had been extended from Kilraine across the Owenea River to the bogs at Tullyard. Machine cutting commenced in 1946, utilising German-made cutting machines. The company employed 250 men in peak season and peak production was 22,000 tons in 1965. Operations ceased in the late 1990s and the railways and stock were lifted in 2006.

== Politics ==
Glenties is a Municipal District, which returns six local residents to Donegal County Council. Nationally, Glenties is part of the five-seat Donegal Dáil constituency.

== Places of interest ==
Glenties is situated at the meeting of two glens, and two rivers; the Owenea and Stranaglough.

=== St. Connell's church ===
One of the most unusual buildings in the area is St Connell's church, which was built in 1974 to replace the old church. The building has a flat roof sloping to the ground at a sharp angle. The original bell from the first church is still used today in the newer church. St. Connell is the patron saint of the parish. Liam McCormack won a European Award for the design of the church in 1974.

=== Patrick MacGill statue ===
A memorial to the 'Navvy Poet', Patrick MacGill, who was born in Glenties, is located on the bridge over the river in the centre of town.

=== St. Connell's Museum ===
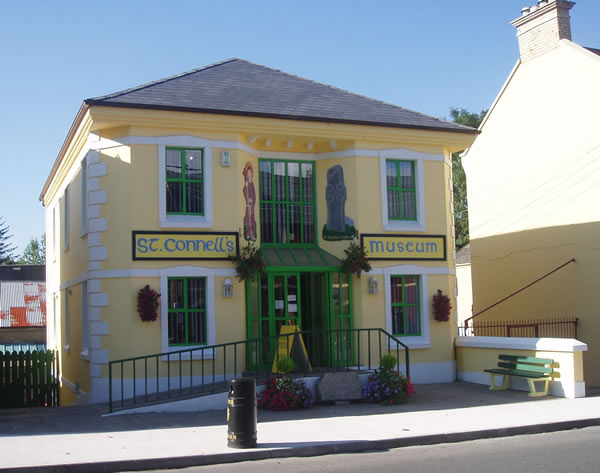
St. Connell's Museum

St. Connell's Museum and Heritage Center houses a collection of local history artefacts, including some from the famine era. The museum is named after St. Connell Caol, who founded a monastic settlement on Inishkeel Island in the 6th century. The museum also has a display about Cardinal Patrick O'Donnell, mementoes from the filming of Dancing at Lughnasa, and a display about the County Donegal Railways Joint Committee. It also has a reading room which contains local historic records.

== Sport ==
The local Gaelic games club – Naomh Conaill – fields teams at all age levels, playing football predominantly.

== In popular culture ==
Glenties was a model for Brian Friel's fictional village of Ballybeg, where several of his works were set. His play Dancing at Lughnasa, for example, was set in Ballybeg.

== Transport ==
Glenties railway station was on a branch line of the County Donegal Railways Joint Committee, a narrow-gauge railway system. The Glenties branch was the first part of the County Donegal Railways to be closed; the railway station (and the branch line) opened on 3 June 1895 and finally closed on 15 December 1947.

Bus transport is currently provided by Bus Éireann, operated by McGeehan's Coaches, which provides services to Letterkenny, Ballybofey, Dungloe, Ardara, Killybegs and Donegal Town.

== Tidy Towns ==
Glenties was the national winner of Ireland's Tidy Towns competition in 1958, 1959, 1960, 1962, and 1995. The Radharc documentary series included a short film following Glenties' third time winning the competition.

In September 1962 a special ceremony was held to commemorate the town winning the competition. Then Minister for Transport and Energy Erskine Childers unveiled a plaque and the occasion was filmed by RTÉ.

Glenties also received gold medals, in the Tidy Towns competition, in 2004, 2005, and 2006 and a silver medal winner in 2003. It also received a silver medal in the European Entente Florale competition held in Győr, Hungary in 2005.

== People ==
- Enda Bonner (born 1949), politician and Gaelic footballer
- Thomas F. Breslin (1885–1942), colonel and victim of the Bataan Death March
- Maureen Cusack (1920–1977), actress
- Brian Friel (1929–2015), playwright
- Tom Gildea (born 1939), politician
- Patrick MacGill (1889–1963), the "Navvy Poet"
- Father James McDyer (1910–1987), Catholic priest and social campaigner
- Jim McGuinness (born 1972), manager of the senior Donegal county football team
- Paddy O'Daire (1905–1981), soldier and activist
- Patrick O'Donnell (1856–1927), Primate of All Ireland
- Máire O'Neill (born 1978), engineer and inventor
