= List of Irish railway and tramway companies =

This is a list of Irish railway and tramway companies, the vast majority being historical and no longer in existence. The list is arranged to show the successive predecessors of the current-day companies, followed by the companies which have no surviving descendants. There is then a list of railways existing in 1920 that were established by statute but were not themselves companies, and a list of statistics for each company in 1913, when the railway network was at its height.

== Current companies ==
- Northern Ireland Railways, the railway division of the Northern Ireland Transport Holding Company, (Note: Trading as 'Translink'.) owns and operates the railway network of Northern Ireland. It was created in 1967 as the successor to the Ulster Transport Authority, which itself had been formed in 1948.
- Iarnród Éireann (IÉ), the railway division of Córas Iompair Éireann (CIÉ), owns and operates the railway network of the Republic of Ireland. Between 1945 and IÉ's creation in 1987, CIÉ directly operated the railways themselves. (Note: CIÉ was incorporated as a private company in 1945 and was then nationalised in 1950.)
- The Fishguard and Rosslare Railways and Harbours Company owns the railways linking Wexford, Rosslare and Waterford, which are operated by IÉ. It was created as a joint venture between the Irish Great Southern and Western Railway and the British Great Western Railway. It is now controlled jointly by IÉ and Stena Line Ports Limited.
- The National Roads Authority (Note: Trading as 'Transport Infrastructure Ireland'.) owns the Luas (although its operation is contracted out). Prior to 2015, it was owned by the Railway Procurement Agency.

== Predecessors of the current companies ==
=== Predecessors of the Great Northern Railway (Ireland) ===
The Great Northern Railway (Ireland) was jointly nationalised by the Northern Ireland and Republic of Ireland governments in 1953, forming the Great Northern Railway Board. In 1958, this arrangement was ended and its assets were split between CIÉ and the UTA.

- Great Northern Railway (Ireland) (incorporated 1876/defunct 1953)
  - Banbridge Extension Railway (1861/1877)
  - Banbridge Junction Railway (1856/1877)
    - Banbridge, Newry, Dublin and Belfast Junction Railway (1853/1856)
  - Banbridge, Lisburn and Belfast Railway (1858/1877)
  - Belfast Central Railway (1864/1885)
  - Castleblayney, Keady and Armagh Railway (1902/1912)
  - Dublin and Antrim Junction Railway (1861/1879)
  - Dungannon and Cookstown Railway (1874/1877)
  - Enniskillen, Bundoren and Sligo Railway (1862/1897)
    - Enniskillen and Bundoran Railway (1861/1862)
  - Londonderry and Enniskillen Railway (1845/1883)
  - Newry and Armagh Railway (1857/1879)
    - Newry and Enniskillen Railway (1845/1857)
  - Newry, Warrenpoint and Rostrevor Railway (1846/1886)
  - Northern Railway (1875/1876)
    - Dublin and Belfast Junction Railway (1845/1875)
    - Dublin and Drogheda Railway (1836/1875)
    - Irish North Western Railway (1862/1876)
      - Dundalk and Enniskillen Railway (1845/1862)
  - Town of Newry Connecting Railway (1857/1886)
  - Ulster Railway (1839/1876)
    - Portadown, Dungannon and Omagh Junction Railway (1857/1876)
      - Portadown and Dungannon Railway (1853/1857)

=== Predecessors of Córas Iompair Éireann ===
- Córas Iompair Éireann (incorporated 1945/defunct 1987) (Note: The company continues to exist as a holding company.)
  - Dublin United Transport (1941/1945)
    - Dublin United Tramways (1881/1941) (Note: In 1896, the 'Dublin United Tramways Company (1896) Limited' was registered and purchased 100% of the shares of both Dublin United Tramways and Dublin Southern District Tramways. However, they remained legally separate concerns until they were both vested in the 1896 company by legislation in 1905.)
      - Dublin and Lucan Electric Railway (1897/1925) (Note: The company went bankrupt in 1925 and was passed to the Dublin City Commisioners. Dublin United Tramways negotiated a deal with Dublin Corporation to aquire it in 1927.)
        - Dublin and Lucan Steam Tramway (1880/1897)
      - Dublin Southern District Tramways (1878/1905)
        - Blackrock and Kingstown Tramway (1883/1893)
      - Lucan and Leixlip Electric Railway (1910/1925)
  - Great Southern Railways (1925/1945)
    - Athenry and Tuam Extension to Claremorris Railway (1890/1925)
    - Ballinascarthy and Timoleague Junction Light Railway (1888/1925)
    - Baltimore Extension Railway (1890/1925)
    - Cavan and Leitrim Railway (1895/1925)
      - Cavan, Leitrim and Roscommon Light Railway and Tramway (1883/1895)
    - Clonakilty Extension Railway (1881/1925)
    - Cork and Macroom Direct Railway (1861/1925)
    - Cork and Muskerry Light Railway (1883/1925)
    - Cork, Blackrock and Passage Railway (1846/1925)
    - Cork City Railways (1906/1925)
    - Donoughmore Extension Railway (1890/1925)
    - Dublin and Kingstown Railway (1831/1925)
    - Dublin and South Eastern Railway (1907/1925)
      - Dublin, Wicklow and Wexford Railway (1860/1907)
        - Dublin and Wicklow Railway (1851/1860)
          - Dublin, Dundrum and Rathfarnham Railway (1846/1851)
          - Waterford, Wexford, Wicklow and Dublin Railway (1846/1851)
    - Great Southern Railway (1924/1925)
      - Cork, Bandon and South Coast Railway (1888/1924)
        - Cork and Bandon Railway (1845/1888)
          - Cork and Kinsale Junction Railway (1859/1880)
          - West Cork Railways (1860/1880)
        - Ilen Valley Railway (1872/1909)
          - Dunmanway and Skibbereen Railway (1870/1872)
      - Great Southern and Western Railway (1844/1924)
        - Castleisland Railway (1872/1879)
        - Clara and Banagher Railway (1880/1895)
          - Midland Counties and Shannon Junction Railway (1861/1880)
        - Cork and Limerick Direct Railway (1860/1871)
        - Cork and Youghal Railway (1854/1866)
        - Irish South Eastern Railway (1846/1863)
          - Grand Leinster and Munster Railway (1837/1846)
          - Wexford, Carlow and Dublin Junction Railway (1846/1846)
        - Kanturk and Newmarket Railway (1888/1892)
        - Killarney Junction Railway (1846/1860)
        - Limerick and Kerry Railway (1880/1902)
        - Rathkeale and Newcastle Junction Railway (1861/1902)
        - Roscrea and Parsonstown Junction Railway (1854/1858)
        - Tralee and Killarney Railway (1853/1860)
        - Waterford and Central Ireland Railway (1868/1900)
          - Central Ireland Railway (1866/1877)
          - Kilkenny Junction Railway (1860/1896)
          - Waterford and Kilkenny Railway (1845/1868)
        - Waterford, Limerick and Western Railway (1896/1901)
          - Waterford and Limerick Railway (1845/1896)
            - Athenry and Ennis Junction Railway (1859/1893)
            - Athenry and Tuam Railway (1858/1893)
            - Limerick and Castleconnell Railway (1856/1872)
            - Limerick and Ennis Railway (1853/1893)
        - Waterford, New Ross and Wexford Junction Railway (1866/1877) (Note: Immediately following the company's purchase by the Great Southern and Western Railway in 1877, the Dublin, Wicklow and Wexford Railway purchased the portion of the line south of Ballywilliam.)
          - Bagenalstown and Wexford Railway (1854/1863) (Note: The railway closed at the end of 1863 and the company was declared bankrupt in 1864. In 1866, its assests were sold to a London barrister. The Waterford, New Ross and Wexford Junction Railway was then incorporated to purchase the assets from him.)
      - Midland Great Western Railway (1845/1924)
        - Dublin and Meath Railway (1858/1888)
        - Great Northern and Western Railway (1857/1890)
        - Navan and Kingscourt Railway (1865/1888)
        - Sligo and Ballaghaderreen Junction Railway (1863/1877)
    - Loughrea and Attymon Light Railway (1885/1925)
    - South Clare Railways (1884/1925)
    - Southern Railway (1865/1925)
    - Timoleague and Courtmacsherry Extension Light Railway (1888/1925)
    - Tralee and Dingle Light Railway (1888/1925)
    - Tralee and Fenit Railway (1880/1925)
    - Waterford and Tramore Railway (1851/1925)
    - West Carbery Tramways and Light Railways (1883/1925) (Note: Also known as the Schull and Skibbereen Tramway and Light Railway)
    - West Clare Railway (1884/1925)

=== Predecessors of the Ulster Transport Authority ===
- Ulster Transport Authority (incorporated 1948/defunct 1966)
  - Belfast and County Down Railway (1846/1948)
    - Belfast, Holywood and Bangor Railway (1860/1884)
    - Downpatrick, Dundrum and Newcastle Railway (1866/1881)
  - Northern Counties Committee (1903/1949) (Note: This was not a company itself, but an operating committee of a succession of British companies (first the Midland Railway, then the London, Midland and Scottish Railway from 1923 and the Railway Executive of the British Transport Commission from 1948))
    - Ballycastle Railway (1878/1924)
    - Belfast and Northern Counties Railway (1860/1903)
      - Ballymena and Larne Railway (1874/1889)
        - Larne and Ballyclare Railway (1873/1874)
      - Ballymena, Ballymoney, Coleraine and Portrush Junction Railway (1853/1861)
      - Ballymena, Cushendall and Red Bay Railway (1872/1884)
      - Belfast and Ballymena Railway (1845/1860)
      - Carrickfergus and Larne Railway (1860/1890)
      - Derry Central Railway (1875/1901)
      - Draperstown Railway (1878/1895)
      - Londonderry and Coleraine Railway (1845/1871)
      - Portstewart Tramway (1880/1897)
    - Limavady and Dungiven Railway (1878/1907)

=== Predecessors of the Fishguard and Rosslare Railways and Harbours Company ===
- Fishguard and Rosslare Railways and Harbours (incorporated 1894)
  - Fermoy and Lismore Railway (incorporated 1869/defunct 1898)
  - Waterford and Wexford Railway (1864/1894)
  - Waterford, Dungarvan and Lismore Railway (1872/1898)

== Other historical companies ==
=== Companies without present-day successors ===
- Belfast Corporation Tramways (incorporated 1905/defunct 1954)
  - Belfast Street Tramways (1872/1905)
    - Belfast and Ligoniel Tramway (1892/1902)
    - Sydenham District Tramways (1885/1902)
  - Cavehill and Whitewell Tramway (1881/1911)
- Bessbrook and Newry Tramway (1884/1948)
- Blessington and Poulaphouca Steam Tramway (1889/1927)
- Carrickfergus Harbour Junction Railway (1882/1957)
- Castlederg and Victoria Bridge Tramway (1883/1933)
- City of Derry Tramways (1893/1919)
- Clogher Valley Railway (1894/1942)
  - Clogher Valley Tramway (1884/1894)
- Clontarf and Hill of Howth Tramroad (1898/1941) (Note: The tramway was leased to Dublin United Tramways (DUT) in 1907. In 1941, DUT bought out the lease, and the tramway was then closed and the company dissolved.)
- Cork Electric Tramways and Lighting (1897/1931)
- Cork Tramways (1871/1875)
- County Donegal Railways Joint Committee (1906/1959) (Note: This was not a company, but a joint operating committee of the Midland Railway and the Great Northern Railway (Ireland) (and their successors).)
  - Donegal Railway (1892/1906)
    - Finn Valley Railway (1860/1892)
    - West Donegal Railway (1879/1892)
- Dublin and Blessington Steam Tramway (1887/1932)
- Dundalk, Newry and Greenore Railway (1873/1951) (Note: This company was controlled by the London and North Western Railway (and its successors).)
  - Dundalk and Greenore Railway (1863/1873)
  - Newry and Greenore Railway (1863/1873)
- Galway and Salthill Tramways (1877/1918)
- Giant's Causeway, Portrush and Bush Valley Railway and Tramway (1880/1949)
- Letterkenny Railway (1860/1953)
- Listowel and Ballybunion Railway (1886/1924)
- Londonderry and Lough Swilly Railway (1853/1953)
- Lucan, Leixlip and Celbridge Steam Tramway (1889/1897)
- Parsonstown and Portumna Bridge Railway (1861/1879)
- Strabane and Letterkenny Railway (1904/1959)
  - Strabane, Raphoe and Convoy Railway (1903/1904)
- Sligo, Leitrim and Northern Counties Railway (1875/1957)
- Warrenpoint and Rostrevor Tramways (1875/1915)

== Other railways in existence in 1920 ==
=== Light railways vested in other companies ===
These railways were authorised under the Irish Light Railways Acts.

Vested in the Belfast and County Down Railway:

- Downpatrick, Killough and Ardglass Railway

Vested in the Cork, Bandon and South Coast Railway:

- Baltimore and Skibbereen Railway
- Bantry Bay Extension Railway

Vested in the County Donegal Railways Joint Committee:

- Donegal and Killybegs Railway
- Stranorlar and Glenties Railway

Vested in the Great Southern and Western Railway:

- Claremorris and Swineford Railway
- Collooney and Swineford Railway
- Headford and Kenmare Railway
- Killorglin and Valentia Railway

Vested in the Londonderry and Lough Swilly Railway:

- Buncrana and Carndonagh Railway
- Letterkenny and Burtonpoint Railway

Vested in the Midland Great Western Railway:

- Achill Extension Railway
- Ballina and Killala Railway
- Galway and Clifden Railway
- Westport and Mallaranny Railway

=== Separate undertakings ===
These railways had their own capital stock, but were not companies in their own right.

Separate undertaking of the Cork, Bandon and South Coast Railway:

- Bantry Extension Railway

Separate undertakings of the Dublin and South Eastern Railway:

- City of Dublin Junction Railways
- New Ross and Waterford Extension Railways

Separate undertaking of the Great Southern and Western Railway:

- Central Ireland Railway (Note: Also known as the Geashill Extension.)

=== State-owned colliery railways ===
These railways were built by the state under the Defence of the Realm Regulations during the First World War.

- Arigna Valley Extension Colliery Railway (Note: Worked by the Cavan and Leitrim Railway)
- Athy and Wolfhill Colliery Railway (Note: Worked by the Great Southern and Western Railway)
- Castlecomer Colliery Railway

== Statistics by company for 1913 ==
=== Railway companies ===
Working companies (Note: These companies operated railways.)
Name	Total capital	Net income	Track gauge	Route length owned	Length of other companies' lines worked	Locomotives	Passenger carriages	Goods wagons	Train miles	Passengers carried	Goods tonnage carried
Ballinascarthy and Timoleauge Junction, and Timoleauge and Courtmacsherry Extension Light Railways	£35,000	£1,750	5 ft 3 in (1,600 mm)	9 miles 0 chains (14.5 km)	0	3	4	20	31,838 miles (51,238 km)	39,016	13,899 long tons (14,122 t)
Ballycastle Railway	£89,809	£1,233	3 ft (914 mm)	16 miles 11 chains (26.0 km)	0	4	13	59	49,326 miles (79,383 km)	110,009	18,123 long tons (18,414 t)
Belfast and County Down Railway	£1,349,757	£67,013	5 ft 3 in (1,600 mm)	80 miles 0 chains (128.7 km)	0	30	153	701	970,834 miles (1,562,406 km)	3,350,637	277,981 long tons (282,442 t)
Bessbrook and Newry Tramway (Note: Despite being a tramway, this company was included in the railway statistics.)	£15,000	£72	3 ft (914 mm)	3 miles 0 chains (4.8 km)	0	0 (Note: 2 electric tramcars owned.)	1	16	22,528 miles (36,255 km)	179,541	10,265 long tons (10,430 t)
Carrickfergus Harbour Junction Railway	£7,230	£346	5 ft 3 in (1,600 mm)	74 chains (1.5 km)	0	0	0	0	0	0	10,007 long tons (10,168 t)
Cavan and Leitrim Railway	£194,685	£10,742	3 ft (914 mm)	48 miles 39 chains (78.0 km)	0	9	12	157	112,456 miles (180,980 km)	102,541	40,228 long tons (40,874 t)
Clogher Valley Railway	£123,310	£6,485	5 ft 3 in (1,600 mm)	37 miles 0 chains (59.5 km)	0	7	13	97	104,672 miles (168,453 km)	115,448	28,838 long tons (29,301 t)
Cork and Macroom Direct Railway	£211,830	£8,878	3 ft (914 mm)	24 miles 40 chains (39.4 km)	0	4	23	102	117,365 miles (188,881 km)	197,751	61,783 long tons (62,774 t)
Cork and Muskerry Light Railway	£75,000	£4,152	5 ft 3 in (1,600 mm)	17 miles 60 chains (28.6 km)	0	6	20	50	79,953 miles (128,672 km)	320,174	25,169 long tons (25,573 t)
Cork, Bandon and South Coast Railway	£875,186	£44,325	5 ft 3 in (1,600 mm)	65 miles 70 chains (106.0 km)	28 miles 20 chains (45.5 km)	20	54	445	546,175 miles (878,983 km)	508,903	190,910 long tons (193,970 t)
Cork, Blackrock and Passage Railway	£426,270	£6,792	3 ft (914 mm)	16 miles 0 chains (25.7 km)	0	4	28	31	135,037 miles (217,321 km)	596,677	11,133 long tons (11,312 t)
Cork City Railways	£136,000	−£1,328	5 ft 3 in (1,600 mm)	1 mile 23 chains (2.1 km)	0	0	0	0	0	1,992	28,482 long tons (28,939 t)
County Donegal Railways Joint Committee	n/a (Note: This was not a company, so it did not have capital raising powers.)	£13,830	3 ft (914 mm)	90 miles 71 chains (146.3 km)	19 miles 17 chains (30.9 km)	21	56	294	385,027 miles (619,641 km)	404,296	83,771 long tons (85,115 t)
Donoughmore Extension Light Railway	£33,000	£1,200	3 ft (914 mm)	8 miles 40 chains (13.7 km)	0	1	2	12	19,055 miles (30,666 km)	48,372	8,230 long tons (8,360 t)
Dublin and South Eastern Railway	£2,461,782	£126,915	5 ft 3 in (1,600 mm)	134 miles 35 chains (216.4 km)	22 miles 67 chains (36.8 km)	70	200	1,019	1,584,889 miles (2,550,632 km)	4,707,704	318,897 long tons (324,014 t)
Dundalk, Newry and Greenore Railway	£387,500	−£1,419	5 ft 3 in (1,600 mm)	26 miles 68 chains (43.2 km)	0	6	12	202	150,109 miles (241,577 km)	197,669	43,945 long tons (44,650 t)
Great Northern Railway (Ireland)	£8,984,189	£457,631	5 ft 3 in (1,600 mm)	561 miles 8 chains (903.0 km)	0	191 (Note: 11 electric tramcars also owned.)	372	5,573	5,589,257 miles (8,995,037 km)	6,819,499	2,154,108 long tons (2,188,675 t)
Great Southern and Western Railway	£14,047,583	£715,018	5 ft 3 in (1,600 mm)	973 miles 15 chains (1,566.2 km)	156 miles 65 chains (252.4 km)	317	521	7,536	8,385,280 miles (13,494,800 km)	6,540,904	2,155,278 long tons (2,189,864 t)
Listowel and Ballybunion Railway	£33,000	£875	Monorail	9 miles 20 chains (14.9 km)	0	3	12	26	27,028 miles (43,497 km)	69,920	6,813 long tons (6,922 t)
Londonderry and Lough Swilly Railway	£153,494	£15.816	3 ft (914 mm)	82 miles 40 chains (132.8 km)	16 miles 40 chains (26.6 km)	16	44	279	303,400 miles (488,300 km)	483,473	72,001 long tons (73,156 t)
Midland Great Western Railway	£6,549,728	£251.037	5 ft 3 in (1,600 mm)	516 miles 31 chains (831.0 km)	21 miles 55 chains (34.9 km)	139	217	3,112	3,498,689 miles (5,630,594 km)	1,748,603	663,894 long tons (674,547 t)
Northern Counties Committee	n/a	£145,262	5 ft 3 in (1,600 mm) and 3 ft (914 mm)	265 miles 35 chains (427.2 km)	0	83	224	2,380	2,224,297 miles (3,579,659 km)	3,857,000	897,777 long tons (912,184 t)
Schull and Skibbereen Tramway and Light Railway	£57,000	£2,850	3 ft (914 mm)	14 miles 60 chains (23.7 km)	0	4	7	50	29,119 miles (46,862 km)	53,779	8,544 long tons (8,681 t)
Sligo, Leitrim and Northern Counties Railway	£486,781	£10.314	5 ft 3 in (1,600 mm)	43 miles 21 chains (69.6 km)	0	10	19	201	207,181 miles (333,425 km)	162,342	65,990 long tons (67,050 t)
Tralee and Dingle Railway	£40,000	£1,600	3 ft (914 mm)	37 miles 40 chains (60.4 km)	0	8	20	71	97,209 miles (156,443 km)	108,538	18,205 long tons (18,497 t)
Waterford and Tramore Railway	£71,250	£3,805	5 ft 3 in (1,600 mm)	7 miles 20 chains (11.7 km)	0	4	21	11	48,975 miles (78,818 km)	336,651	5,240 long tons (5,320 t)
West Clare Railway	£180,000	£6,839	3 ft (914 mm)	27 miles 0 chains (43.5 km)	26 miles 0 chains (41.8 km)	11	27	170	185,978 miles (299,303 km)	220,937	47,466 long tons (48,228 t)

Non-working companies (Note: These companies did not operate railways (but did own them).)
Name	Total capital	Net income	Working company
Athenry and Tuam Extension to Claremorris Railway	£100,000	£88	Great Southern and Western Railway
Ballinrobe and Claremorris Light Railway	£71,640	£173	Midland Great Western Railway
Bantry Extension Railway	£105,000		Cork, Bandon and South Coast Railway
City of Dublin Junction Railways	£430,230		Dublin and South Eastern Railway
Clonakilty Extension Railway	£60,000	£108	Cork, Bandon and South Coast Railway
Dublin and Kingstown Railway	£411,300	£217	Dublin and South Eastern Railway
Fishguard and Rosslare Railways and Harbours	£2,908,914	£285	Great Southern and Western Railway
Letterkenny Railway	£141,428	£191	Londonderry and Lough Swilly Railway
Loughrea and Attymon Light Railway	£54,445	£229	Midland Great Western Railway
New Ross and Waterford Extension Railways	£100,000		Dublin and South Eastern Railway
South Clare Railways	£140,000		West Clare Railway
Southern Railway	£306,267	£1,394	Great Southern and Western Railway
Strabane and Letterkenny Railway	£239,306	−£581	County Donegal Railways Joint Committee
Tralee and Fenit Railway	£58,360	−£996	Great Southern and Western Railway

=== Tramway companies ===
Working companies (Note: These companies operated tramways.)
Name	Total capital	Track gauge	Route length	Net income	Passengers carried	Tram miles	No. of tramcars
Belfast Corporation Tramways	£1,454,800	4 ft 8 1/2 in (1,435 mm)	47 miles 60 chains (76.8 km)	£111,784	63,131,820	6,865,591 miles (11,049,098 km)	289
Blessington and Poulaphouca Steam Tramway	£25,000	5 ft 3 in (1,600 mm)	4 miles 54 chains (7.5 km)	£142	24,097	10,273 miles (16,533 km)	0 (Note: The company used the rolling stock of the Dublin and Blessington Steam Tramway)
Castlederg and Victoria Bridge Tramway	£24,580	3 ft (914 mm)	7 miles 12 chains (11.5 km)	£796	27,822	22,499 miles (36,209 km)	5
City of Derry Tramways	£18,570	4 ft 8 1/2 in (1,435 mm)	1 mile 41 chains (2.4 km)	£201	318,290	41,852 miles (67,354 km)	9
Cork Electric Tramways and Lighting	£173,672	3 ft (914 mm)	9 miles 56 chains (15.6 km)	£5,496	5,864,339	893,591 miles (1,438,095 km)	35
Dublin and Blessington Steam Tramway	£97,070	5 ft 3 in (1,600 mm)	15 miles 73 chains (25.6 km)	−£103	258,973	99,249 miles (159,726 km)	11
Dublin and Lucan Electric Railway	£64,750	3 ft 6 in (1,067 mm)	7 miles 0 chains (11.3 km)	£1,096	469,780	145,980 miles (234,930 km)	14
Dublin United Tramways	£2,047,100	5 ft 3 in (1,600 mm)	49 miles 65 chains (80.2 km)	£126,778	53,907,845	7,175,852 miles (11,548,414 km)	330
Galway and Salthill Tramway	£16,500	3 ft (914 mm)	2 miles 10 chains (3.4 km)	−£182	285,405	43,376 miles (69,807 km)	7
Giant's Causeway, Portrush and Bush Valley Railway and Tramway	£50,500	3 ft (914 mm)	8 miles 60 chains (14.1 km)	£1,346	155,115	41,107 miles (66,155 km)	23
Portstewart Tramway	£5,943 (Note: This figure is for capital expended as the tramway was not a company, so it did not have capital in this way.)	3 ft (914 mm)	1 mile 67 chains (3.0 km)	£146	132,387	14,519 miles (23,366 km)	4
Warrenpoint and Rostrevor Tramways	6,557	3 ft (914 mm) (Note: The gauge may have actually been 2 ft 10 in (864 mm).)	3 miles 24 chains (5.3 km)	−£92	82,499	30,177 miles (48,565 km)	12

Non-working companies (Note: These companies did not operate tramways (but did own them).)
Name	Total capital	Track	Route length	Working company
Belfast Harbour Commissioners	£20,021	4 ft 8 1/2 in (1,435 mm)	1 mile 9 chains (1.8 km)	Belfast Corporation Tramways
Clontarf and Hill of Howth Tramroad	£75,000	5 ft 3 in (1,600 mm)	5 miles 37 chains (8.8 km)	Dublin United Tramways
Lucan and Leixlip Electric Railway	£1,555	3 ft 6 in (1,067 mm)	36 chains (0.72 km)	Dublin and Lucan Electric Railway
Hill of Howth Tramway	£113,408	5 ft 3 in (1,600 mm)	5 miles 22 chains (8.5 km)	Great Northern Railway (Ireland)
