= Ulster railways =

Ulster railways, present and past, include:

- Northern Ireland Railways, formerly Ulster Transport Authority

== Heritage railways ==
- List of heritage railways in Northern Ireland

== Former railway companies ==
- Annaghmore Turf Railway
- Ballycastle Railway
- Belfast Central Railway
- Belfast and County Down Railway and its constituents:

- Belfast, Hollywood and Bangor Railway
- Downpatrick, Dundrum and Newcastle Railway

- Belfast and Northern Counties Railway and its constituents:

- Belfast and Ballymena Railway
- Ballymena, Ballymoney, Coleraine and Portrush Junction Railway
- Ballymena, Cushendall and Red Bay Railway
- Ballymena and Larne Railway
- Carrickfergus and Larne Railway
- Derry Central Railway
- Draperstown Railway
- Londonderry and Coleraine Railway
- Limavady and Dungiven Railway
- Portstewart Tramway

- Belfast Harbour Commissioners
- Belfast Street Tramways
- Bessbrook and Newry Tramway
- Carnlough Lime Company
- City of Derry Tramways
- County Donegal Railways Joint Committee and its constituents:

- Donegal Railway
- Finn Valley Railway
- Strabane and Letterkenny Railway
- West Donegal Railway

- Clogher Valley Railway
- Castlederg and Victoria Bridge Railway
- Dundalk, Newry and Greenore Railway
- Giant's Causeway, Portrush and Bush Valley Railway & Tramway
- Glenariff Iron Ore and Harbour Company
- Glenanne and Loughgilly Tramway
- Great Northern Railway (Ireland) and its constituents in Ulster:

- Banbridge, Lisburn and Belfast Railway
- Banbridge, Newry, Dublin and Belfast Junction Railway
- Belfast Central Railway
- Castleblayney, Keady and Armagh Railway
- Dublin and Antrim Junction Railway
- Dublin and Belfast Junction Railway
- Dundalk and Enniskillen Railway
- Enniskillen and Bundoran Railway
- Irish North Western Railway
- Londonderry and Enniskillen Railway
- Newry and Armagh Railway
- Newry, Warrenpoint and Rostrevor Railway
- Northern Railway of Ireland
- Portadown, Dungannon and Omagh Railway
- Town of Newry Connecting Railway
- Ulster Railway

- Londonderry Port and Harbour Commissioners
- Londonderry and Lough Swilly Railway and its constituents:

- Burtonport Extension Railway
- Cardonagh Extension Railway
- Letterkenny Railway

- Northern Counties Committee
- Sligo, Leitrim and Northern Counties Railway
- Trostan Mineral Railway
- Ulster Transport Authority
- Warrenpoint and Rostrevor Tramway

== See also ==
- List of Irish railway and tramway companies
- List of narrow gauge railways in Ireland
- History of rail transport in Ireland
