= Carrick Primary School =

Carrick Primary School may refer to:

- Carrick Primary School (Warrenpoint), Warrenpoint, County Down, Northern Ireland
- Carrick Primary School (Lurgan), Lurgan, County Armagh, Northern Ireland
