= Galway Bay =

Large bay in County Galway, western Ireland

- Cuan na Gaillimhe
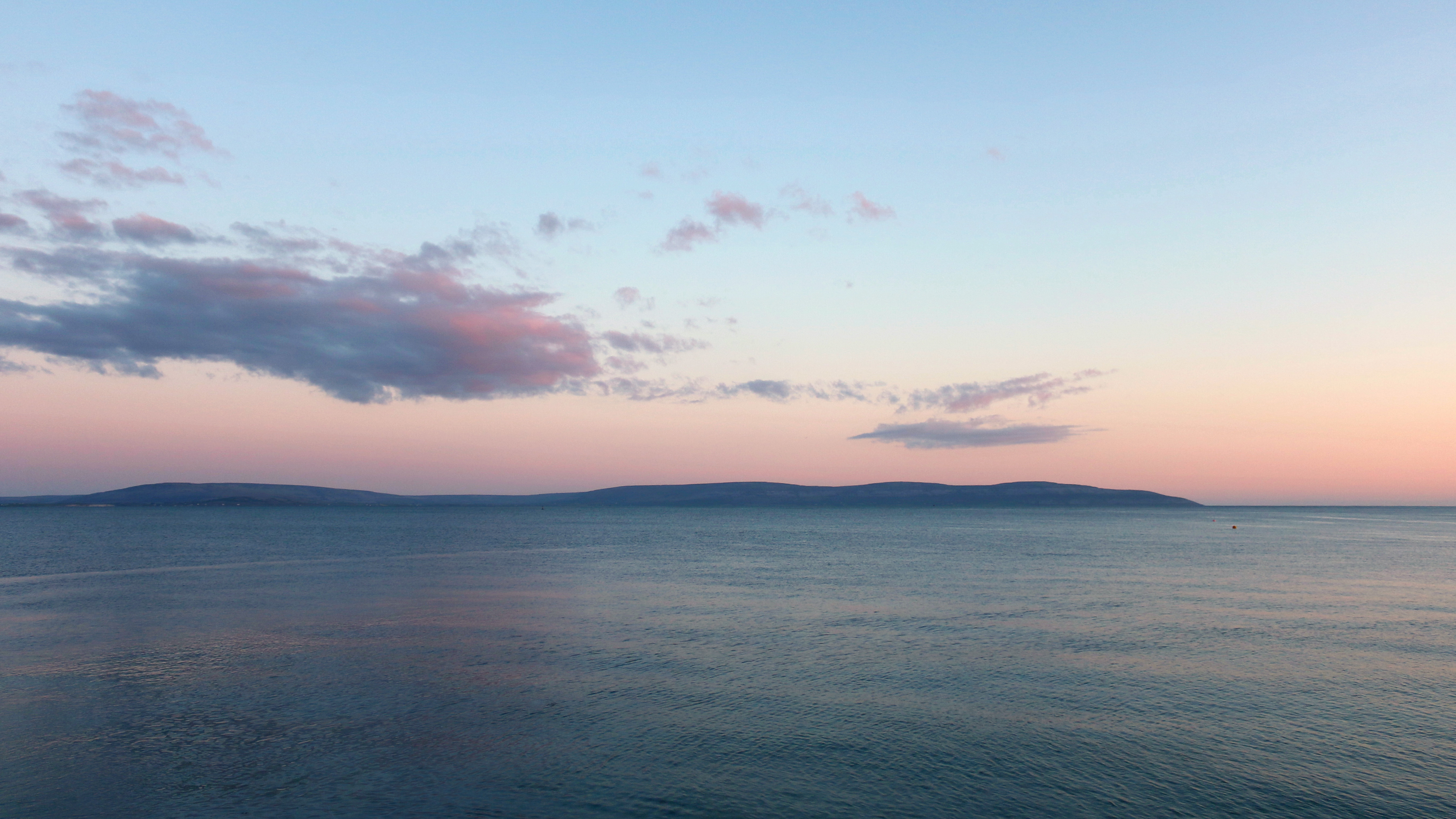
- View of Galway Bay from Salthill

- Location in Ireland
- Coordinates: 53°12′N 9°14′W
- Type: Bay
- Primary inflows: River Corrib

Galway Bay (Irish: Loch Lurgain or Cuan na Gaillimhe) is a bay on the west coast of Ireland, between County Galway in the province of Connacht to the north and the Burren in County Clare in the province of Munster to the south; Galway city is on the northeast side. The bay is about 50 kilometres (30 mi) long and from 10 kilometres (6 mi) to 30 kilometres (20 mi) in breadth. The Aran Islands (Oileáin Árann) are to the west across the entrance and there are numerous small islands within the bay. To the west of Galway, the rocks are granite but to the south they are limestone.

The approaches to the bay between the Aran Islands and the mainland are as follows:

- the North Sound (An Súnda ó Thuaidh) lies between Inishmore and Leitir Mealláin in Connemara; known as Bealach Locha Lurgan in Irish.
- Gregory's Sound (Súnda Ghríoghóra) lies between Inishmore and Inishmaan; known as Bealach na h-Áite in Irish.
- Foul Sound (An Súnda Salach) lies between Inishmaan and Inisheer; known as Bealach na Fearbhaighe in Irish.
- South Sound (An Súnda ó Theas), known as Bealach na Finnise in Irish, lies between Inisheer and County Clare.

Galway Bay is famous for its unique traditional sailing craft, the Galway hooker.

== Special Area of Conservation ==
The coastal parts of Galway Bay have been designated a Special Area of Conservation. This is because of the wide range of important habitat types which include intertidal mud and sandflats, other littoral habitats, coastal lagoons, saltmarshes, turloughs, vegetated cliffs, calcareous grassland and limestone pavements. Galway Bay offers habitat to common seals and otters, and is an important ornithological site for seabirds, waders and waterfowl.

The lagoons are slightly brackish and have a diverse flora, including tasselweed and the algae Chaetomorpha linum, Chara canescens and Lamprothamnion papulosum, all of which are lagoon specialists. There are areas of fen dominated by great fen-sedge and black bog-rush, with common reed, purple moor-grass, bogbean and long-stalked yellow-sedge. The turlough at Ballinacourty forms a temporary lake of about 25 ha (60 acres) in winter. Wetland species found near the exit-hole of the turlough include amphibious bistort, marsh bedstraw and marsh cinquefoil, with silverweed, water mint and creeping bent in the less frequently flooded places near the edge; sedges (Carex spp.) dominate the rest of the area.

The orchid-rich grassland occurs on the flanks of some low drumlin hills to the west of Galway City. The plants here are calcium-loving species including kidney vetch, harebell, spring gentian, yellow-wort, greater knapweed, common spotted-orchid, lesser twayblade, pyramidal orchid and some scrubby juniper. An unusual feature of the saltmarshes is that, beside thrift, lax-flowered sea lavender, red fescue, common scurvygrass, common saltmarsh-grass, saltmarsh rush and sea rush, dwarf brown seaweeds are present among the vegetation.

== Drowning tragedy of 1902 ==
On 4 May 1902, eight fishermen from a nearby village lost their lives while sailing on Galway Bay, near Kilcolgan. Seven (Patrick Folan, Patrick Burns, Patrick McDonagh, John Barrett, Michael Burke, Michael Dwyer and Stephen Hynes) drowned; Patrick Walsh swam to shore at nearby Kilcolgan, but died of exhaustion on the beach. A fundraising campaign was organised for the families of the drowned fishermen.

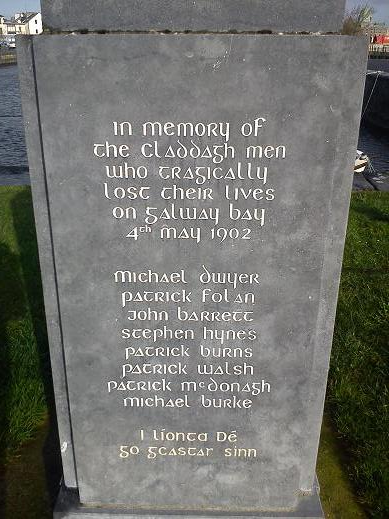
Cladagh Memorial opposite St Mary's Church, the Claddagh, Galway

== In popular culture ==
=== Songs ===
- From traditional Irish song The Rare Old Mountain Dew:

Let grasses grow and waters flow
In a free and easy way
But give me enough of the rare old stuff
That's made near Galway Bay

- From John Lennon's song The Luck of the Irish:

If we could make chains with the morning dew
The world would be like Galway Bay

- From Arthur Colahan's song Galway Bay:

If you ever go across the sea to Ireland
Then maybe at the closing of your day
You will go and see the moon rise over Claddagh
Or see the sun go down at Galway Bay.

- From a song performed by Sean Connery in Disney's Darby O'Gill and the Little People:

Have you ever seen the seagulls
a-flying o'er the Heather
or the crimson sails on Galway Bay
the fishermen unfurl?

- From Steve Earle's musical tribute to Townes Van Zandt, Ft. Worth Blues:

There's a full moon over Galway Bay tonight
Silver light over green and blue
And every place I travel through, I find
Some kinda sign that you've been through

Earle also mentions Galway and The Long Walk in his song "Galway Girl".

- From the Pogues's Fairytale of New York:

And then he sang a song:
"The Rare Old Mountain Dew"
I turned my face away
And dreamed about you.
(...)
The boys in the NYPD choir
are still singing "Galway Bay"
And the bells are ringing out
For Christmas day.

- From Toasted Heretic's Galway Bay:

The sun goes down on Galway Bay
The daughter goes down on me
Her dad's not due until one or maybe two
And I'm happy as I'll ever be

- From The Mahones A Drunken Night in Dublin:

A drunk night in Dublin
Ended up in Galway Bay

- From The Waterboys' Spring Comes to Spiddal:

On a soft and fresh Atlantic air a mist of pollen floats
On Galway Bay I spy a gaily painted fishing boat

- Galway Bay is not mentioned in Ireland's Call, Ireland's official rugby anthem, written by Phil Coulter.

== Gallery ==
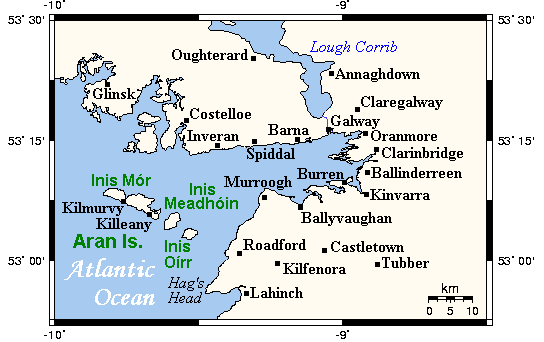
Map of Galway Bay and environs.

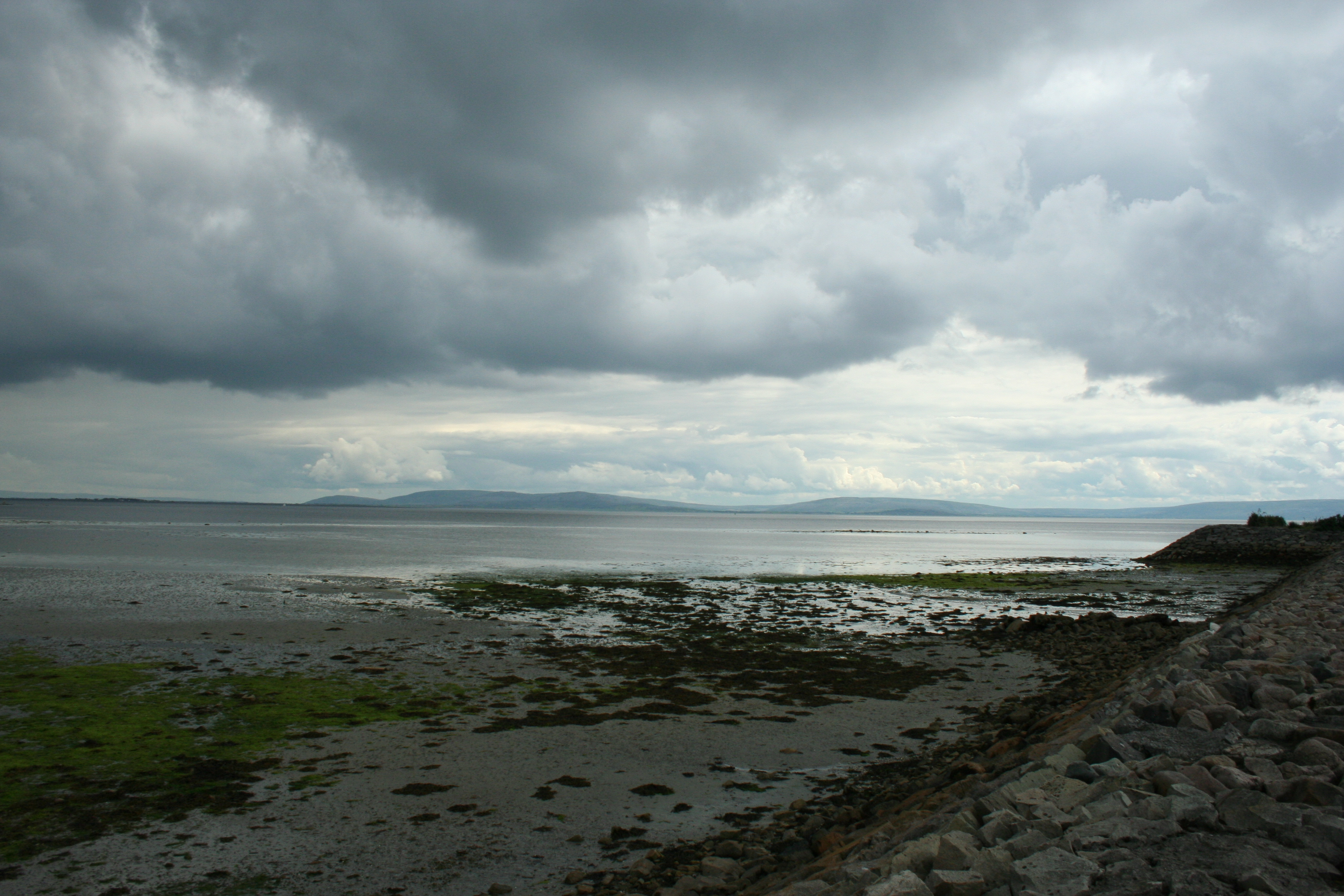
Galway Bay from Salthill.

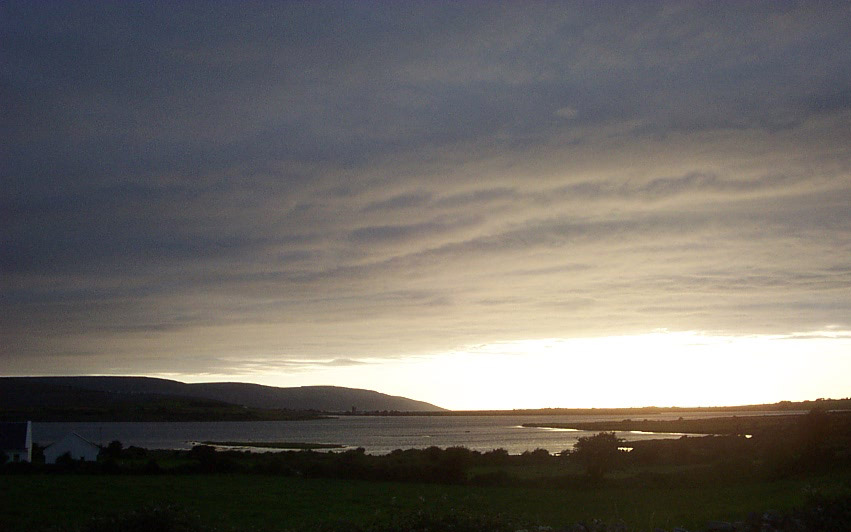
Galway Bay near County Clare.

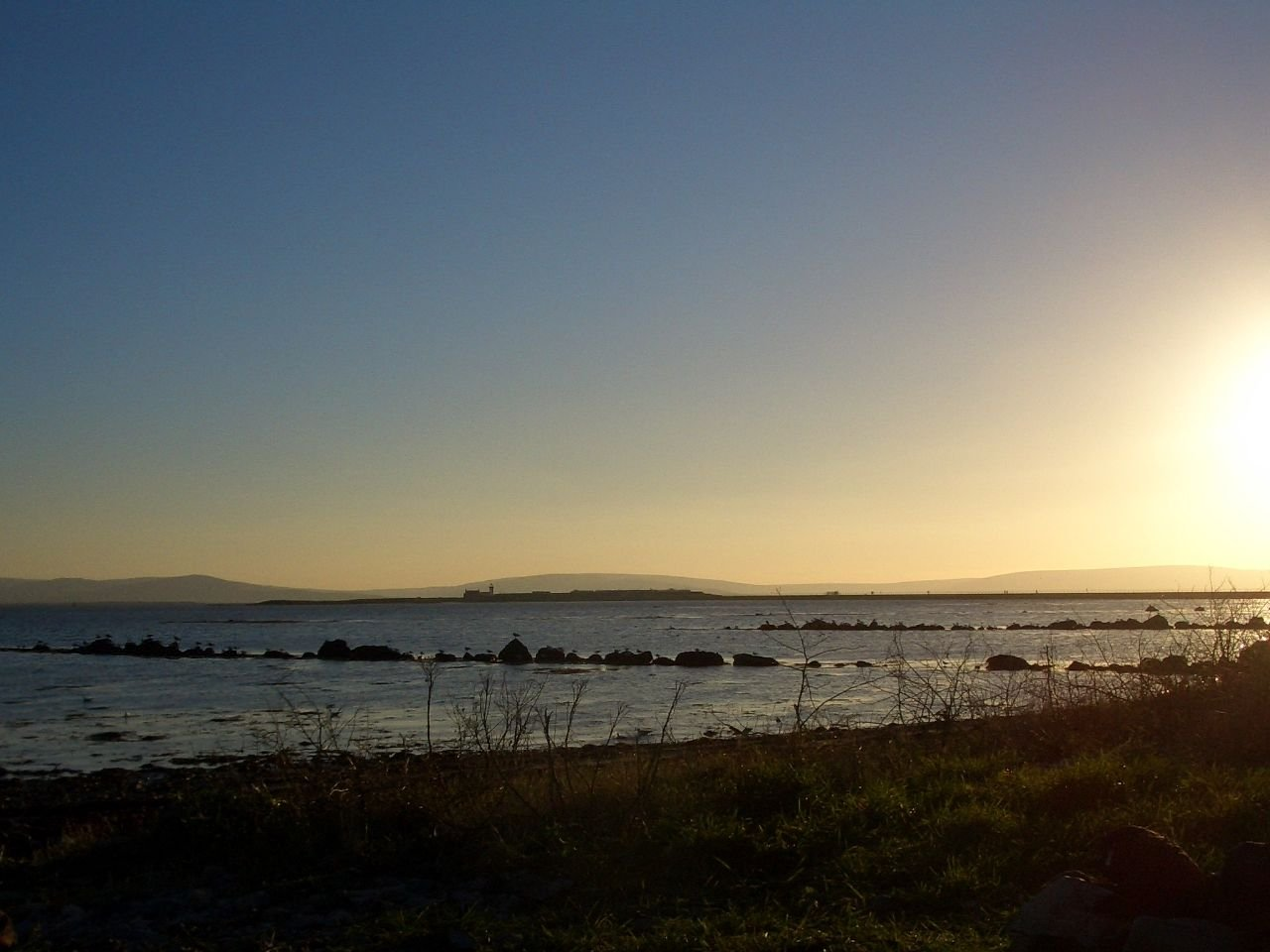
Galway Bay in December.

== See also ==
- List of loughs in Ireland
- Island Eddy
- Galway Bay Steamboat Company

== Sources ==
- O'Carra, B., Williams, D.M., Mercer, B. and Wood. B. 2014. Evidence of environmental change since the earliest medieval period from the inter-tidal zone of Galway Bay. Ir. Nat. J. 33: pp 83–88.
