= Waterford and Tramore Railway =

Former Railway in Republic of Ireland

History
- Opened: 5 September 1853
- Closed: 31 December 1960

Technical
- Line length: 7 miles 20 chains (11.7 km) (1922)
- Track length: 8 miles 8 chains (13.0 km) (1922)
- Track gauge: 1,600 mm (5 ft 3 in) Irish gauge

The line in 1872

The Waterford and Tramore Railway (W&TR) was a railway in County Waterford, Ireland, that linked the city of Waterford and the seaside town of Tramore, a distance of 7 1/4 miles (11.7 km). The railway officially opened on 5 September 1853 and opened for normal business on 7 September 1853. The line had no intermediate stations, only the two termini, and was to remain completely isolated from the rest of the Irish railway network throughout its life. It closed on 31 December 1960.

== History ==
Waterford and Tramore Railway Act 1851
- Act of Parliament
- Parliament of the United Kingdom
- Long title: An Act for making a Railway from Waterford to Tramore.
- Citation: 14 & 15 Vict. c. cxii

Dates
- Royal assent: 24 July 1851

The railway was authorised by the Waterford and Tramore Railway Act 1851 (14 & 15 Vict. c. cxii). Construction began on 10 February 1853, the Waterford business community meeting the £77,000 cost. William Dargan's construction company completed the single track line by 2 September 1853, less than seven months. This was a considerable achievement as a section of line outside Waterford ran over deep bog covered with bulrushes. Each terminus included a turntable.

The company offered a number of concessions and travel offers, some of which were related to the expansion of the resort of Tramore. A combined Hotel and rail travel was offered, free travel was offered to various religious orders, and house builders in Tramore could have their building materials transported for free and they were also entitled to a free travel pass for five years.

On 1 January 1925 the Great Southern Railways (GSR) was formed and absorbed the W&TR. On 31 December 1944 the GSR and Dublin United Transport Company merged to form CIÉ.

Traffic reach a peak in 1952 with fourteen services each way following introduction of a cheaper fares policy.

On 27 September 1960 CIÉ announced that it would close the line on 31 December and replace it with a bus service. To avoid demonstrations, the last scheduled train did not run. The final trains run were the 13:25 from Waterford and the 14:10 from Tramore.

In the first half of 1961 all the tracks were lifted and the rails scrapped by a Dublin scrap firm with the sleepers were sold for use in defences against coastal erosion. Locally it was rumoured that the tracks were to be shipped to Nigeria. Similar false rumours attended many railway closures at the time.

One of the few remaining traces of the railway is Tramore station house, which after lying derelict for many years is now owned by Waterford County Council.

== Route ==
The Waterford and Tramore Railway was the only broad gauge line in Ireland that was not connected to any other. The W&TR was one of five railways that served Waterford. The others were: the Dublin and South Eastern Railway; the Waterford and Central Ireland Railway; the Waterford, Dungarvan and Lismore Railway; and the Waterford, Limerick and Western Railway. The latter three were absorbed into the Great Southern and Western Railway by just after the turn of the twentieth century. Only the W&TR was never to use the main Waterford station to the north-east of the River Suir, though the Waterford, Dungarvan and Lismore's initial terminus was also to the south of the Suir.

== Rolling stock ==
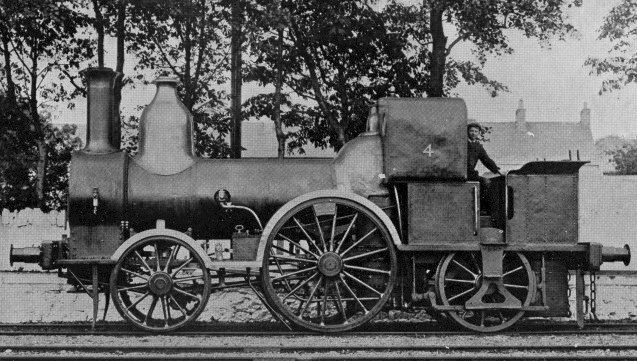
Engine No. 4, built for the Liverpool and Manchester Railway in 1847, in use on the Waterford & Tramore Railway until 1905

The railway was initially worked with two 2-2-2 tank locomotives built by William Fairbairn & Sons in 1855, numbered 1 and 2. Several other locomotives were added later. No. 2 was scrapped in 1928. No. 1 remained in service until 1936 when it was derailed and plunged down an embankment, and cut up on the site. By then several other locomotives had been brought to the W&T from the main railway network. When No. 1 met with its end, It was then the last locomotive with single driving wheels in regular traffic in the British Isles.

From c. 1955 CIÉ 2600 Class diesel railcars Nos. 2657, 2658 and 2659 were dedicated to the line, being adapted to have second class and no toilet facilities giving a capacity of nearly 100. They were moved from Waterford by road when introduced and upon line closure.

== Bibliography ==
- Baker, Michael H. C. (1972). Irish Railways since 1916. Shepperton: Ian Allan. ISBN 0711002827. OCLC 248259641.
- Casserley, H. C. (1960). Historic locomotive pocket book. London: BT Batsford. OCLC 752832005.
- Casserley, H. C. (1974). Outline of Irish Railway History. Newton Abbot & North Pomfret: David & Charles. ISBN 0715363778. OCLC 249227042.
- Clements, Jeremy; McMahon, Michael (2008). Locomotives of the GSR. Newtownards: Colourpoint Books. ISBN 9781906578268. OCLC 547074718.
- Fayle, H; Newham, AT (1972) [1964]. The Waterford & Tramore Railway. Newton Abbott: David & Charles. ISBN 0-7153-5518-X.
- Flynn, Ian; Taylor, Andy; Friends (2001h). "Early History". Edmund Rice Primary School. Waterford & Tramore Railway.
- Flynn, Ian; Taylor, Andy; Friends (2001f). "The First Train". Edmund Rice Primary School. Waterford & Tramore Railway.
- Flynn, Ian; Taylor, Andy; Friends (2001d). "Developments". Edmund Rice Primary School. Waterford & Tramore Railway.
- Flynn, Ian; Taylor, Andy; Friends (2001a). "Accidents". Edmund Rice Primary School. Waterford & Tramore Railway.
- Flynn, Ian; Taylor, Andy; Friends (2001e). "End of an Era". Edmund Rice Primary School. Waterford & Tramore Railway.
- Flynn, Ian; Taylor, Andy; Friends (2001c). "Close". Edmund Rice Primary School. Waterford & Tramore Railway.
- Mulligan, Fergus (1990) [1983]. One Hundred and Fifty Years of Irish Railways. Belfast: Appletree Press. ISBN 9780862812331. OCLC 20525095.
- O'Donoghue, Frank (2012). The 5-Minute Bell. Frank O'Donoghue. ISBN 9780957448407.
- Rowledge, J. W. P. (1995). A Regional History of Railways. Vol. 16 – Ireland. Penryn: Atlantic Transport Publishers. ISBN 0-906899-63-X. OCLC 164930974.
