= St Mark's High School, Warrenpoint =

Coordinates: 54.113°N 6.260°W

- Ardscoil Naomh Marcas, An Pointe

Location
- Upper Dromore Road; Warrenpoint, BT34 3PN; Northern Ireland

Information
- Type: Secondary School
- Religious affiliation: Roman Catholic
- Local authority: Education Authority (South Eastern)
- Principal: Mr. McGivern
- Staff: 100 approx.
- Gender: Co-educational
- Age: 11 to 19
- Enrolment: Around 1000
- Colour
- Website: stmarkswarrenpoint.org

St. Mark's High School is a Roman Catholic co-education secondary school situated just outside Warrenpoint, County Down, Northern Ireland.

It first opened its doors in 1970 when 120 pupils attended.

== Academics ==
The school provides instruction in a range of academic subjects. In 2018, 52% of its entrants achieved five or more GCSEs at grades A* to C, including the core subjects English and Maths. Also in 2018, 60% of its entrants to the A-level exam achieved A*-C grades.

== Sport ==
The school won the U-16 Ulster title in 2014 and the U-18 title in 2015 in Gaelic football.
