= Warrenpoint =

Port town in County Down, Northern Ireland

Coordinates: 54.0988°N 6.2490°W

Warrenpoint: Irish: An Pointe / Pointe an Bháirínigh
- Town
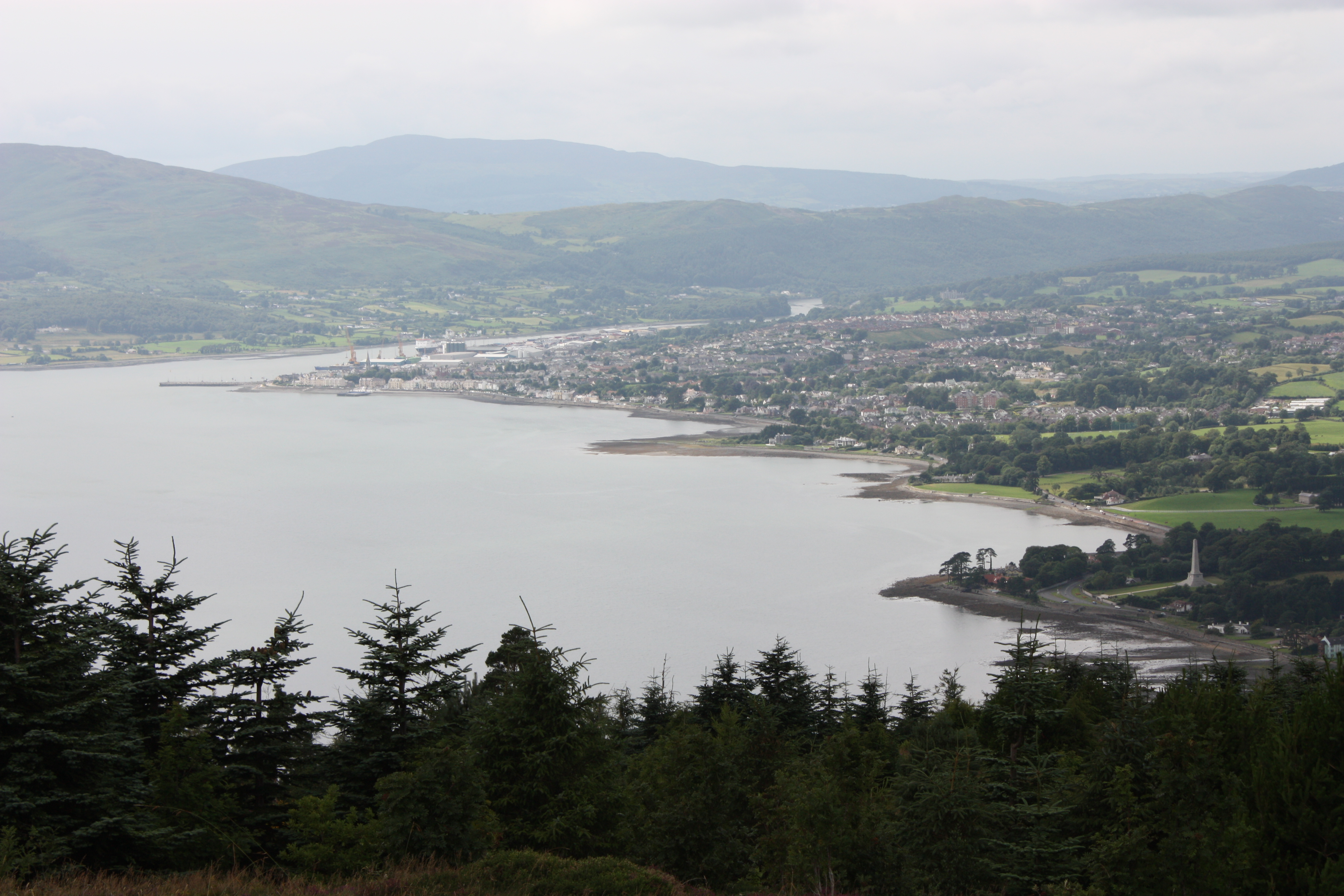
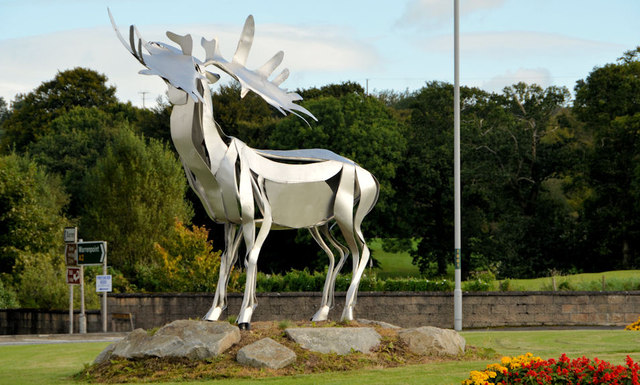
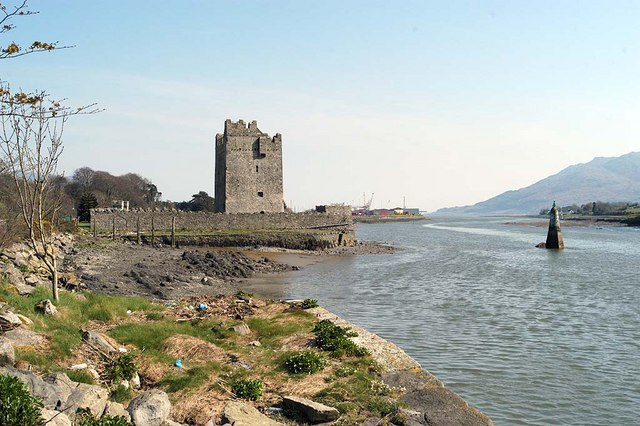
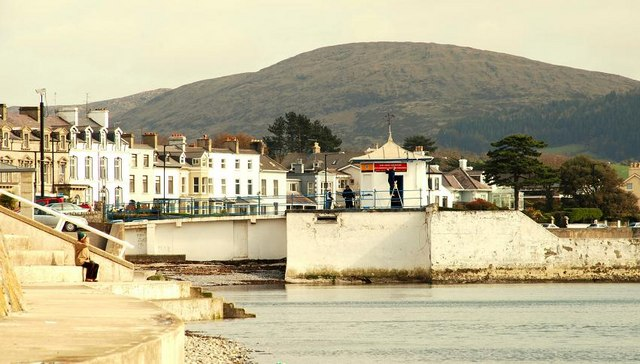
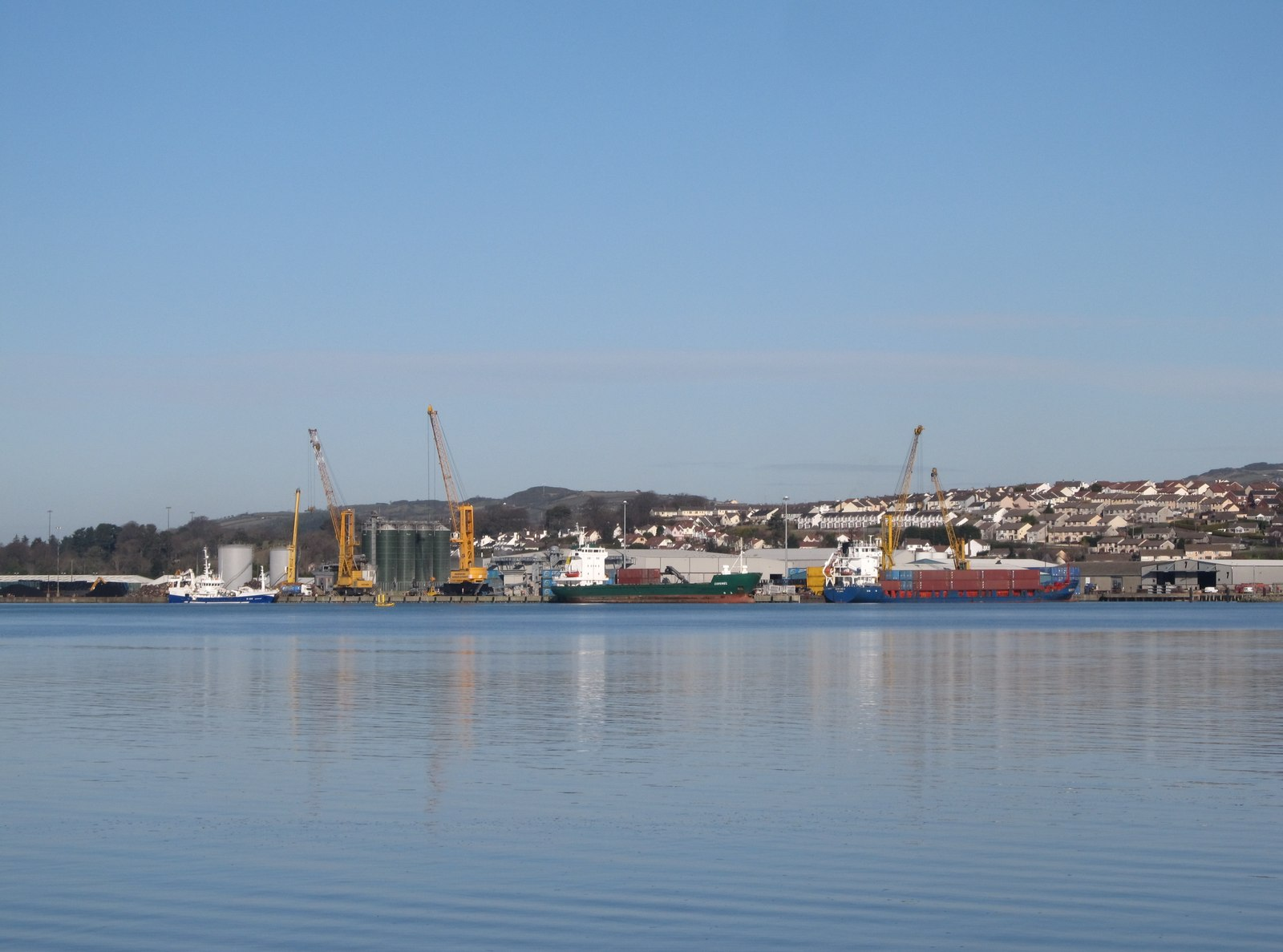
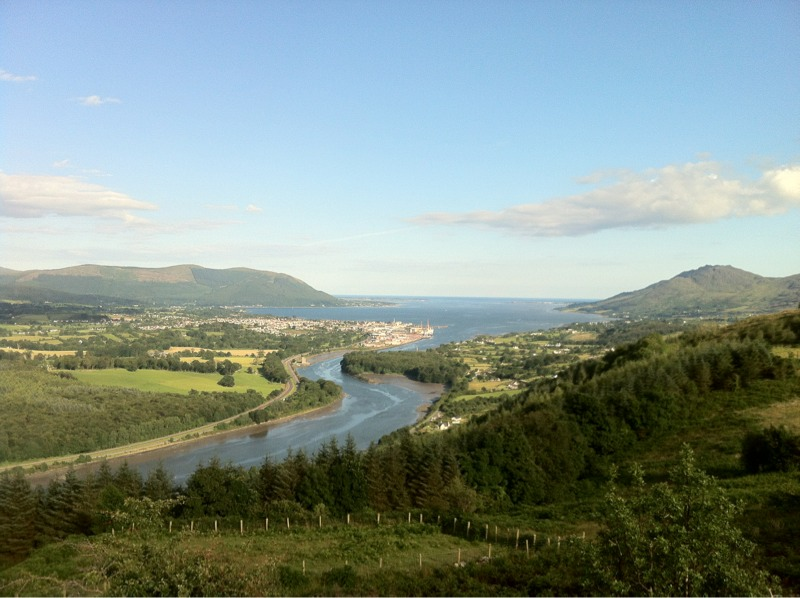
- Clockwise from top left Town from Slieve Martin, Elk at town entrance, Public Baths at Seaview, Warrenpoint from Flagstaff, Warrenpoint Port, Old Narrow Water Castle

- Location within County Down
- Population: 9,091 (2021 census)
- Irish grid reference: J145180
- District: Newry, Mourne and Down
- County: County Down
- Country: Northern Ireland
- Sovereign state: United Kingdom
- Post town: NEWRY
- Postcode district: BT34
- Dialling code: 028
- UK Parliament: South Down
- NI Assembly: South Down

Warrenpoint is a small port town and civil parish in County Down, Northern Ireland. It sits at the head of Carlingford Lough, south of Newry, and is separated from the Republic of Ireland by a narrow strait. The town is beside the village of Rostrevor and is overlooked by the Mournes and Cooley Mountains. Warrenpoint sprang up within the townland of Ringmackilroy (from Irish Rinn Mhic Giolla Ruaidh 'McIlroy's point'), and is locally nicknamed "The Point", which also represents the town's full name in Irish, An Pointe.

Warrenpoint is known for its scenic location, the Maiden of Mourne festival, the Blues on the Bay music festival, the passenger ferry service between Warrenpoint and Omeath and the nearby Narrow Water Castle. Warrenpoint Port is second in terms of tonnage handled by ports in Northern Ireland. It had a population of 9,091 at the 2021 census.

== History ==
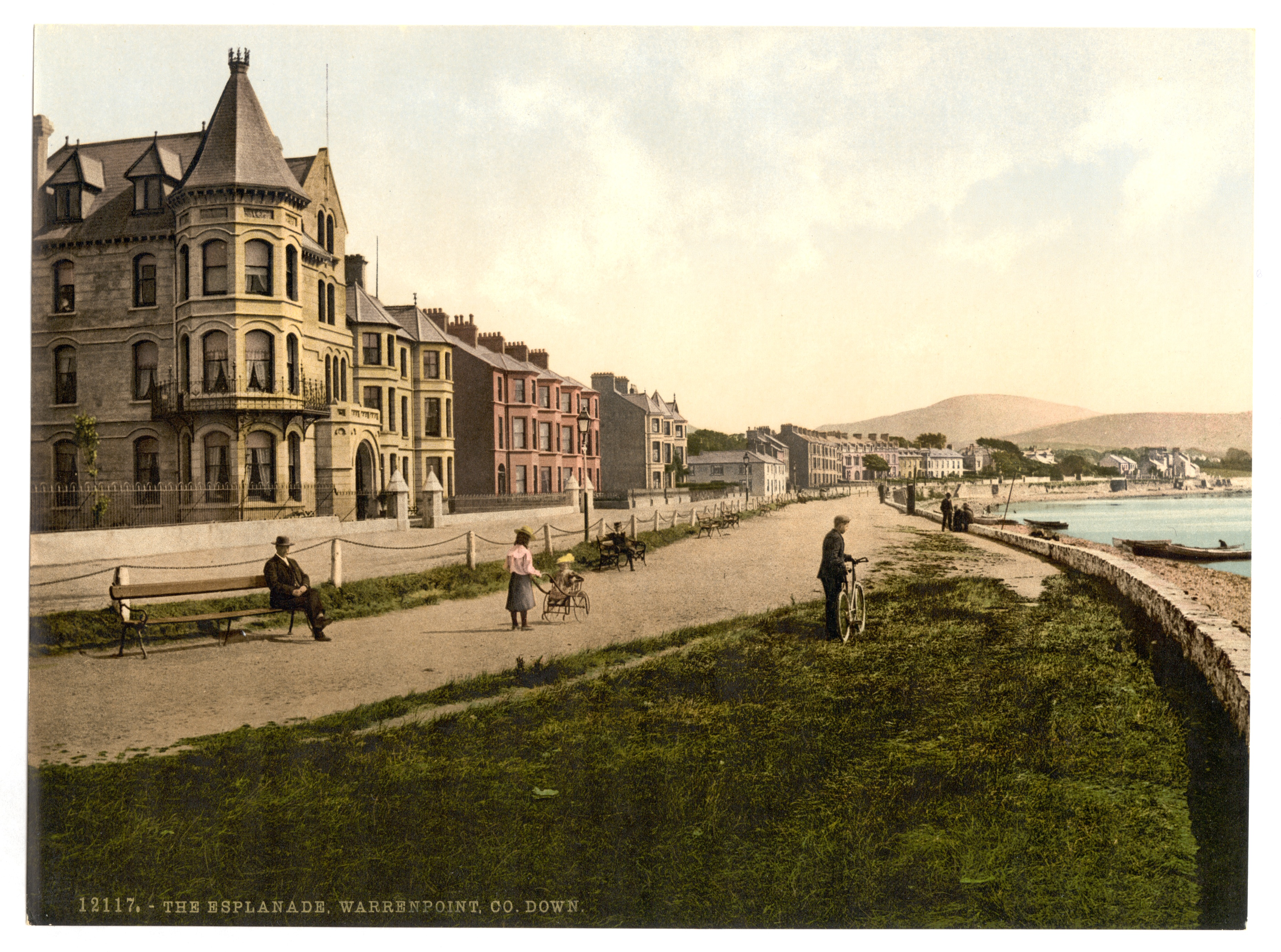
The waterfront at Warrenpoint in the late 19th century

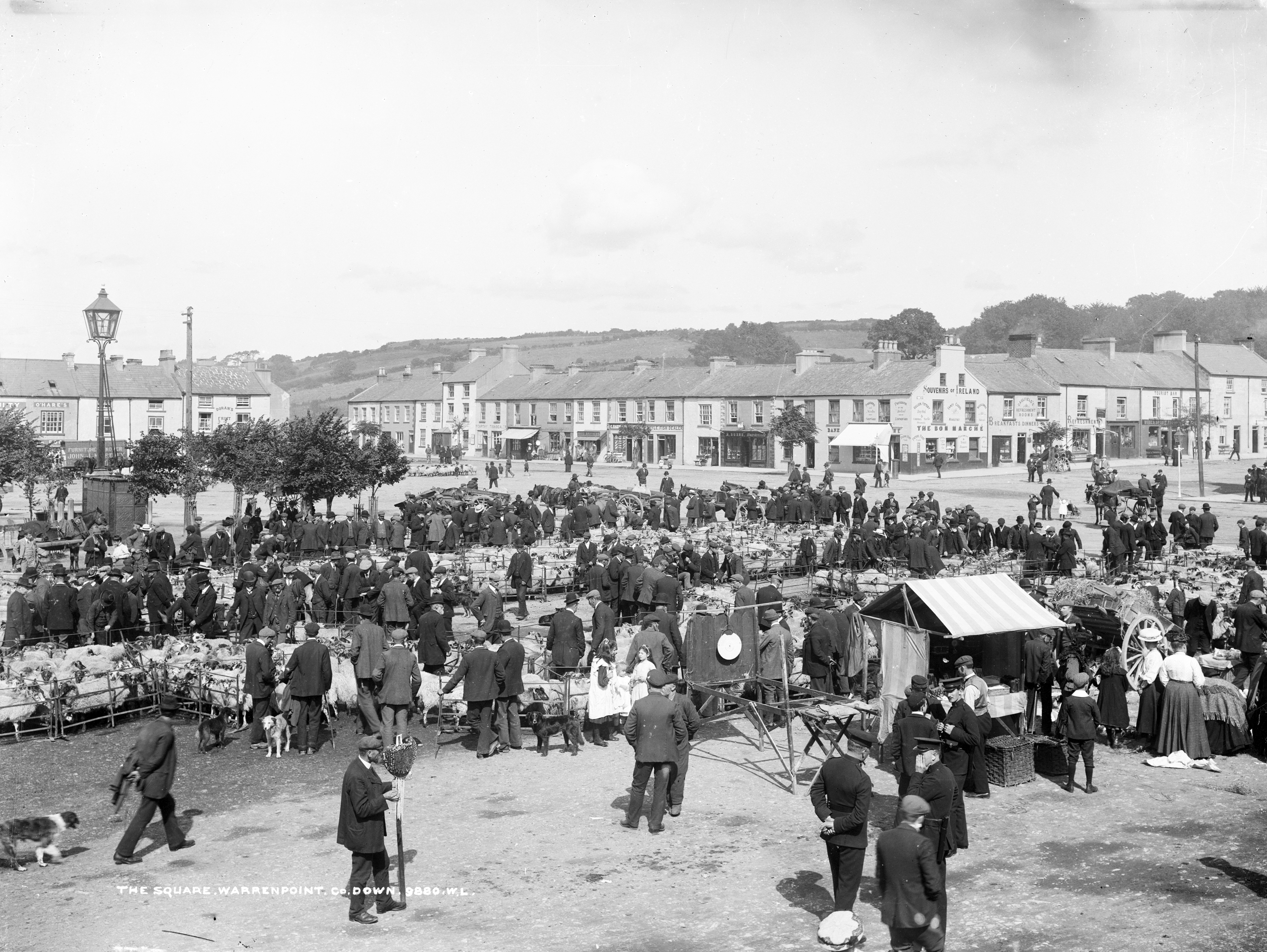
The Square, c.1902

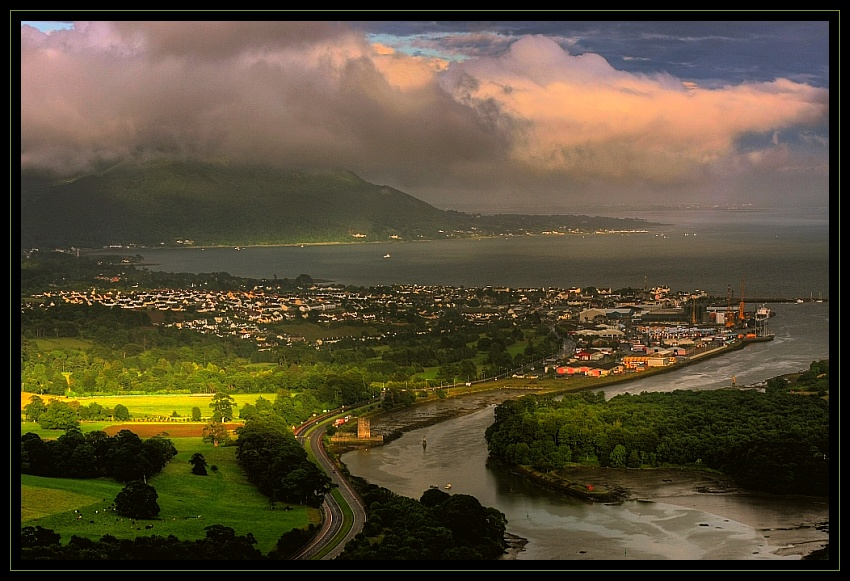
Warrenpoint from the north

The area of Warrenpoint was formerly known as Rinn Mhic Giolla Ruaidh ("McIlroy's point"), anglicised Ringmackilroy, which is still the name of the townland in which it sits. Earlier, it was also known as Portyneil, which may come from Port Uí Néill ("O'Neill's port") or Port an Aoil ("port of the lime").

The earliest reference to the settlement of Warrenpoint is in 1744. It is believed to come from the English surname Waring. It is reported that By 1750 there were only two houses in the village, "with a few huts for the occasional residence of the fishermen during the oyster season". In the following fifty years, however, its scenic setting and coastal location seem to have hastened its swift growth and by 1837 it had 462 houses.

Fairs were held once a month and a market every Friday. In the mid-19th century, Newry merchants obtained a government grant to create a tidal dock at the village, as prior to 1850 ships of above 150 tonnes could not get further up the lough than Narrow Water.

A railway connection opened on 9 May 1849, increasing Warrenpoint's popularity as a holiday destination. and Warrenpoint became popular as a resort town. Thousands flocked to the resort every year, where most took the passenger ferry to Omeath in County Louth. The Warrenpoint railway station closed in January 1965, while the ferry continued on a seasonal basis until 2015.

A bandstand in the town park provided concerts and a saltwater swimming pool was built in 1908. The baths were opened by Captain Roger Hall on Whit Monday, 8 June in that year, but they are now closed to the public.

On 6 February 1921, during the Irish War of Independence, the Irish Republican Army ambushed an Ulster Special Constabulary (USC) patrol in Warrenpoint. The ambush took place on Seaview Road and one USC constable was killed.

During World War II, on 15 July 1944 two Royal Air Force aircraft (an Airspeed Oxford (LX 598) and a Miles Martinet (MS626) from No. 290 Squadron RAF) were taking part in a civil defence demonstration at Warrenpoint. In misty conditions the planes collided, the pilots only having seen each other at the last minute. The resultant explosion killed all on board, and pieces of the planes fell onto Church Street, Duke Street and Queen Street and into Carlingford Lough. The bodies of the airmen were recovered and taken to the mortuary in Newry.

On 27 August 1979, during "the Troubles", the Provisional Irish Republican Army (IRA) ambushed a British Army convoy at nearby Narrow Water Castle. Eighteen soldiers were killed in what became known as the Warrenpoint ambush – the British Army's greatest loss-of-life in a single incident during the conflict.

On 12 April 1989, Joanne Reilly was killed by the IRA in a van bomb attack on Warrenpoint Royal Ulster Constabulary base. Inadequate warning was given.

== Places of interest ==
Two small inland lakes, the "Mill Dam" and the "Waterworks" offer a variety of fishing opportunities. A permit is needed to fish these lakes, which are located about 1 mile from the town centre.

Warrenpoint Promenade was used as a backdrop for Bundoran in the film The Butcher Boy, especially the exterior of the Star of the Sea Convent and the Edwardian swimming baths.

The Bridal Loanan is one of the biggest cul-de-sac's in the world and the largest in Europe. It also has the Magennis Investiture Stone at its peak.

== Education ==
St Dallan's Primary School, a Catholic primary school of about 700 pupils, was opened in September 2000 by the then Education Minister Martin McGuinness. Formed from the merger of the Star of the Sea and St. Peters Primary Schools, it was built on the site of the former St. Peters Primary School.

Other schools in the area include Dromore Road Primary School and St Mark's High School.

== Transport ==
The A2 road connects Warrenpoint to Newry, by way of Narrow Water Castle. A bus service links Newry, Warrenpoint and Rostrevor along the A2. The long-planned Narrow Water Bridge to Omeath was expected to begin construction during 2023.

The Newry, Warrenpoint and Rostrevor Railway opened in 1849 and was taken over by the Great Northern Railway (Ireland) in 1889, operating with the Newry and Armagh Railway as part of the branch to Armagh before it closed to passengers in 1933. The line to Warrenpoint eventually closed down in 1965, with the railway trackbed used to build the A2 dual carriageway. Warrenpoint railway station was located next to the docks. Railway service was never extended to Rostrevor, but from 1877 until 1915 the Warrenpoint and Rostrevor Tramway ran horse-drawn trams on the route.

Warrenpoint port has regular freight ferries to Heysham, operated by CLdN. Local ferry services between Warrenpoint and Omeath operated for many years, but ceased in 2015 with the retirement of the last ferry captain.

The Newry Ship Canal was closed to commercial shipping in 1974, but remains intact as far as Newry city centre, and can be sailed by leisure boats.

== Demography ==
National Identity of Warrenpoint residents (2021)
Nationality	Per cent
Irish	64.3%
Northern Irish	24.6%
British	9.4%

=== 2021 census ===
On census day in 2021 (21 March 2021), the usually resident population of Warrenpoint/Burren was 9,091. Of these:

- 86.3% belong to or were brought up Catholic and 8.1% belong to or were brought up in a 'Protestant and other (non-Catholic) Christian (including Christian related)'.
- 9.4% indicated that they had a British national identity, 64.3% had an Irish national identity and 24.6% had a Northern Irish national identity.

=== 2011 census ===
On census day in 2011 (27 March 2011), the usually resident population of Warrenpoint/Burren was 8,732 accounting for 0.48% of the NI total. Of these:

- 99.19% were from the white (including Irish Traveller) ethnic group
- 87.72% belong to or were brought up Catholic and 9.57% belong to or were brought up in a 'Protestant and other (non-Catholic) Christian (including Christian related)'
- 13.80% indicated that they had a British national identity, 56.33% had an Irish national identity and 29.74% had a Northern Irish national identity.

== Notable people ==
- Connall Courtney – motorcycle racer
- B. M. Croker (1847–1920) – novelist; born in Warrenpoint
- Denis Donoghue (1928–2021) – literary critic; brought up in Warrenpoint
- George Gardiner (1821–1891) – recipient of the Victoria Cross
- Carmel Hanna (born 1946) – Social Democratic and Labour Party politician
- Thomas Caulfield Irwin (1823–1892) – poet, writer, and classical scholar; born in Warrenpoint
- Cathal McCabe (born 1963) – poet; grew up in Warrenpoint
- Forrest Reid (1875–1947) – writer and literary critic; died in Warrenpoint
- Clodagh Rodgers (1947–2025) – singer; born in Warrenpoint
- Vedran Smailović (born 1956) – Bosnian cellist, lives in Warrenpoint

== Civil parish of Warrenpoint ==
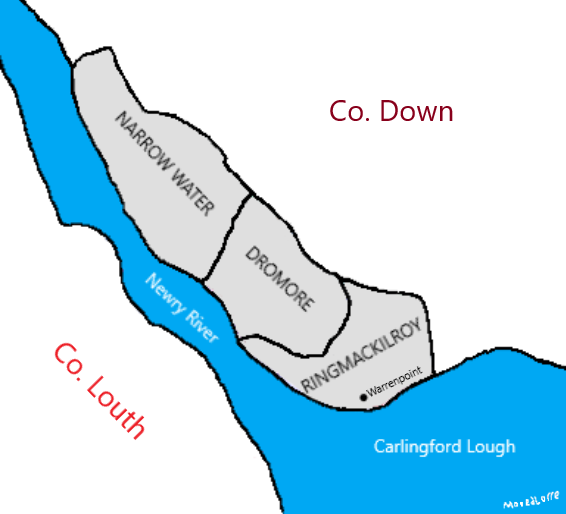
A map of the Warrenpoint civil parish

The civil parish contains the town of Warrenpoint. The civil parish contains the townlands of Dromore, Narrow Water and Ringmackilroy.

== See also ==
- List of localities in Northern Ireland by population
- List of civil parishes of County Down
- Warrenpoint GAA
- Warrenpoint and Rostrevor Tramway
- Warrenpoint Town F.C.
