= Galway and Salthill Tramway =

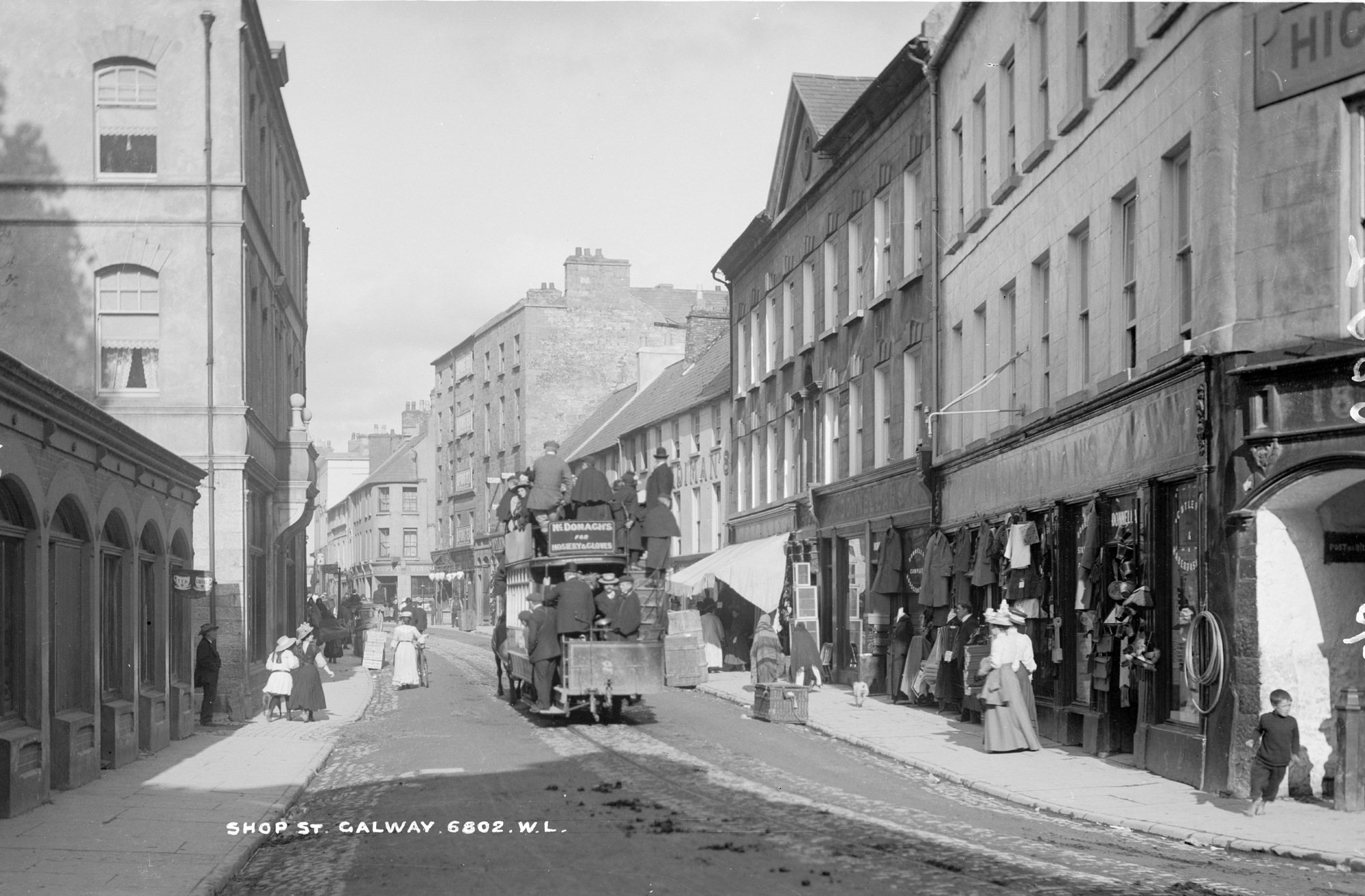

Operation
- Locale: Galway
- Open: 1 October 1879
- Close: 1918
- Status: Closed

Infrastructure
- Track gauge: 3 ft (914 mm)
- Propulsion system: Horse

Statistics
- Route length: 2.13 miles (3.43 km)

The Galway and Salthill Tramway Company operated a 3 ft (914 mm) narrow gauge passenger tramway service in Galway between 1879 and 1918.

== History ==
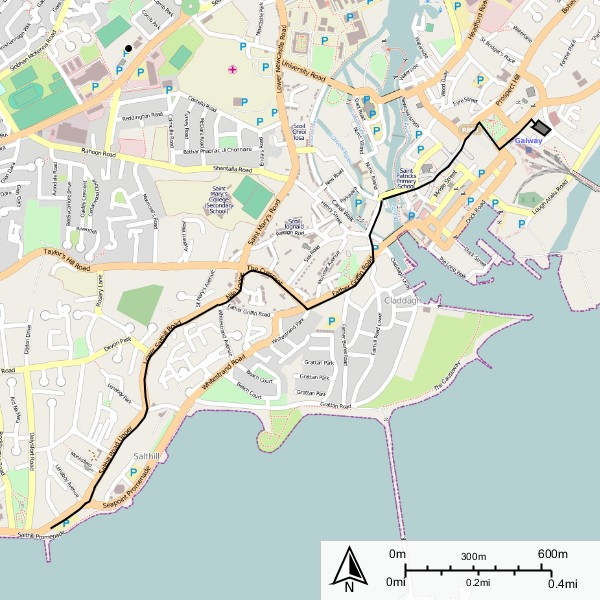
Route of the Galway and Salthill Tramway

The company was incorporated in 1877 and the tramway was opened in 1879. The tramway consisted of a single track, approximately 3.6 kilometres in length, with eight passing loops to permit trams travelling in opposite directions to pass one another.

The tramway linked the city of Galway and the seaside resort of Salthill. The route ran from the depot on Forster Street, Galway near to Galway railway station south west to a terminus on the seafront at Salthill. The cost of construction was £13,000.

The initial six tramcars were double-deck cars by the Starbuck Car and Wagon Company, requiring two horses each. The tramway relied heavily on the tourist trade, which was drawn by the possibility of excursions to the Aran Islands by the Galway Bay Steamboat Company.

== Closure ==
The reliance on the tourist trade resulted in a slump in the company's fortune during the First World War and many of the company horses were commandeered by the British Army in 1917 for the war effort. The company was wound up during 1918.
