= Connall Courtney =

Irish motorcycle racer

Connall Courtney is an Irish motorcycle racer. He was born in Newry, County Down, Northern Ireland.

== Career ==
In 2015, in his first full year of racing, Courtney won both Irish and Ulster Junior Championships.

In 2016, Courtney rode for Ian Lougher's Team ILR in the Standard Moto3 Class in the British Championship.

In 2017, Courtney competed in the British & Irish Superbike Championship in the Moto3 Class.
