= H. C. Casserley =

British photographer (1903–1991)

Henry Cyril Casserley
- Born: June 12, 1903
- Died: December 16, 1991 (aged 88)
- Years active: 1919–1979
- Employer(s): Prudential Assurance Company, London
- Known for: British railway photography
- Spouse: Kathleen Goose (m. 1931–1986)
- Father: Edward Casserley

Henry Cyril Casserley (12 June 1903 – 16 December 1991) was a British railway photographer. In the 1920s and 1930s, he photographed remote corners of the railway network in the United Kingdom and Ireland. His work provided a source of illustrations for books and magazines.

== Life ==
Henry Cyril Casserley was born in Clapham, County of London, to Edward Casserley, a minor Post Office official, and his wife, Sarah (née Turton). Edward had a strong interest in mechanical objects and built a model railway in his loft, which could have led to Henry's enthusiasm for trains. Henry spent his working life in the head offices of the Prudential Assurance Company in London until he was evacuated to Derby in World War II. He married Kathleen Goose on 16 July 1931. Their son Richard (31 December 1936 – 18 October 2017) also took up photography and later acted as custodian of his father's collection.

The family lived beside the railway line just east of the Bromley South railway station from 1931 to 1939, but they moved to a house on a new estate in Berkhamsted, Hertfordshire, as the electrification of the Southern Railway greatly reduced the number of steam trains passing through Bromley. Casserley acquired his first motor car in 1934, which aided his reaching of obscure small railway lines and investigation of windmills, in which he had also developed an interest.

== Photography ==
Casserley's first camera was a Kodak No. 2 folding Brownie with f/8 Rapid rectilinear lens acquired in 1919, but this was soon replaced by a professional standard Butcher's 'Popular Pressman' quarter-plate reflex camera (using 4¼" x 3¼" glass plates). In 1937, he replaced it with a Leica 35 mm camera, which served him until the end of his career, being replaced with an identical model when the original was stolen in 1963.

Despite a few experiments with early commercial colour film, he continued using black-and-white photography. His record-keeping of negatives used a numbering system he later shared with his son, and it is estimated that he had personally taken 60,000 railway subjects by 1972, in some fifty-two years of work.

== Publication ==
Before retirement, he wrote or compiled a few books, including the self-published Locomotive cavalcade (1952), and editions of The Observer's Book of Railway Locomotives of Britain for Frederick Warne & Co. From 1964 to 1979 he put together more than 20 titles, mostly collections of photographs – usually his own – for specialist transport publishers David & Charles, Ian Allan and D. Bradford Barton.

== Bibliography of major book publications ==
- Veterans of the track, Ian Allan, 1946
- Locomotive cavalcade, H. C. Casserley, 1952
- (ed.) Service suspended, Ian Allan, [1951]
- (with Leslie Lewis Asher) Locomotives of British Railways, 4 vols, Dakers, 1955
- The Observer's Book of Railway Locomotives of Britain, 5 editions, F. Warne, 1955–1966 (and subsequent 'historic' reprints)
- The historic locomotive pocketbook: from the ’Rocket’ to the end of steam, Batsford, 1960
- Steam locomotives of British Railways, 3 editions, Hamlyn, 1961–1973 (with assistance from Leslie Lewis Asher, based on the 1955 Dakers publication)
- (with S. W. Johnston) Locomotives at the Grouping, 4 vols, Ian Allan, 1966
  - 1: Southern Railway [1974 paperback edition ISBN 0-7110-0552-4]
  - 2: London & North Eastern Railway [1974 paperback edition ISBN 0-7110-0553-2]
  - 3: London Midland & Scottish Railway [1974 paperback edition ISBN 0-7110-0554-0]
  - 4: Great Western Railway [1974 paperback edition ISBN 0-7110-0555-9]
- British locomotive names of the twentieth century, Rev. ed., Ian Allan, 1967
- Midland album, Ian Allan, 1967
- Britain's Joint Lines, Ian Allan, 1968
- Preserved locomotives, 5 editions, Ian Allan, 1968–1980
- (with C. C. Dorman) The Midlands, (Railway history in pictures series), David and Charles, 1969, ISBN 0-7153-4687-3
- London and South Western locomotives (incorporating F. Burtt: LSWR Locomotives: a survey 1873–1922, published 1949) Ian Allan, 1971
- Railways between the wars, David and Charles, 1971, ISBN 0-7153-5294-6
- H. C. Casserley (Famous railway photographers series), David and Charles, 1972, ISBN 0-7153-5631-3
- Railways since 1939, David and Charles, 1972, ISBN 0-7153-5487-6
- Outline of Irish railway history, David and Charles, 1974, ISBN 0-7153-6377-8
- LMSR steam, 1923–1948, D. Bradford Barton, 1975, ISBN 0-85153-257-8
- Wessex (Railway history in pictures series), David and Charles, 1975, ISBN 0-7153-7058-8
- The Lickey Incline (Locomotion papers, 91), Oakwood Press, 1976
- LMSR locomotives, 1923–1948 (three vols), D. Bradford Barton, 1976
- Recollections of the Southern between the wars, D. Bradford Barton, 1976, ISBN 0-85153-278-0
- LNER locomotives, 1923–1948, D. Bradford Barton, 1977, ISBN 0-85153-298-5
- LNER steam, 1923–1948, D. Bradford Barton, 1977, ISBN 0-85153-296-9
- Irish Railways in the heyday of steam, D. Bradford Barton, 1979, ISBN 0-85153-347-7
- (ed.) The later years of Metropolitan steam, D. Bradford Barton, [1979?], ISBN 0-85153-327-2
- Light railways of Britain : standard gauge and narrow gauge, D. Bradford Barton, 1979, ISBN 0-85153-321-3
- Scottish Railways in the heyday of steam, D. Bradford Barton, 1979, ISBN 0-85153-350-7
- Welsh railways in the heyday of steam, D. Bradford Barton, 1979, ISBN 0-85153-357-4
