= City of Derry Tramways =

Former tramway in Ireland (1897–1919)

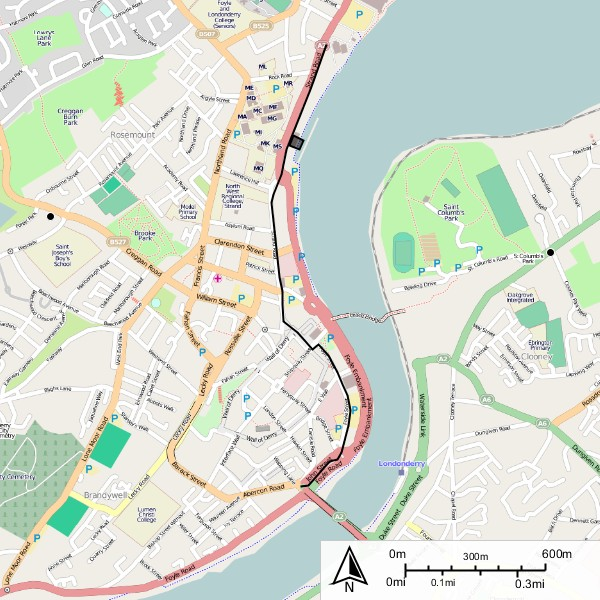
City of Derry Tramways

The City of Derry Tramways was a tramway in Derry, Ireland that operated from 1897 until 1919. This was a standard gauge (4 ft 8 1/2 in (1,435 mm)) line served by horse trams and was never electrified.

The tramway had only one line. It was 1.5 miles (2.4 km) long and ran along the City side of the River Foyle parallel to the Londonderry Port and Harbour Commissioners' (LPHC) railway on that side of the river. The tramway's southern terminus was by Craigavon Bridge and its northern terminus was between Graving Dock and Pennyburn. Intermediate stops included:

- Water St. (loop)
- Shipquay Place, Guildhall (loop)
- Foyle College (loop)
- Depot

It served the GNR's Londonderry Foyle Road station, the LPHC's Middle Quay station and the Londonderry and Lough Swilly Railway's Londonderry Graving Dock station.

City of Derry Tramways ceased operations in 1919.

== Sources ==
- Hajducki, S. Maxwell (1974). A Railway Atlas of Ireland. Newton Abbott: David & Charles. map 3, page xvii. ISBN 0-7153-5167-2.
- Tramway Systems of the British Isles – Their Uniforms, Badges and Buttons: City of Derry Tramways (Much history and two photos of tram cars)
