= Galway Bay Steamboat Company =

- Industry: Shipping
- Founded: 1871
- Headquarters: Galway
- Area served: Galway, Aran Islands

The Galway Bay Steamboat Company provided shipping services between Galway and the Aran Islands from 1871.

== History ==
The Galway Bay Steamboat Company was registered in November 1871.

In 1872, a paddle steamer named The Citie of the Tribes began service as the first regular service between Galway and the Aran Islands. Launched on 17 August 1872, she was built by Joseph T. Eltringham & Co., South Shields (Yard No. 24), and was 117 gross tons. She was sold in 1903 to Charles Duncan in Middlesbrough and broken up in 1910.

She was replaced in 1893 when the SS Duras made her first trip to Aran. This ship was commissioned by the company as a passenger and cargo vessel and was also used as a tug assisting sailing ships in and out of Galway port. She was built in South Shields by JP Rennoldson and Sons Ltd (Yard No. 146) and launched on 24 November 1892.

She made three sailings a week to the islands and from 1898 onwards, during the Summer, she made three sailings a week to Ballyvaughan. The single fare to Aran was 3/- for saloon and 2/6 for deck passengers. The fare to Ballyvaughan was 2/-.

In 1899 it was reported that the company had been receiving £700 per annum for the regular service to the Aran Islands three times per week.

In July 1912, the SS Dun Aengus replaced the Duras. The Duras was kept for towage and relief works until 1921, when she was sold to Frederick Palmer in Boston, Lincolnshire and later other owners before she was broken up in Denmark in 1954.

The SS Dun Aengus was 120 feet long, with a beam of 24 feet and depth of 10ft 6in. She was 234 gross tons and had a steam engine from Ross and Duncan of Glasgow. She was originally purchased by means of a £7,500 loan from the Congested Districts Board. Following the waiving of the sums outstanding on the loan, the government made agreement with the company under the Aran Islands (Transport) Acts, 1936 and 1946, that the vessel would transfer to the government if the company ceased to operate the service to the Aran Islands.

The SS Dun Aengus continued to run until 1958. A new boat built in Dublin, MV Naomh Éanna, operated the service between 1958 and 1988.
