= Newry, Warrenpoint and Rostrevor Railway =

Defunct railway in Ireland

Overview
- Dates of operation: 1849–1886
- Successor: Great Northern Railway (Ireland)

Technical
- Track gauge: 5 ft 3 in (1,600 mm)

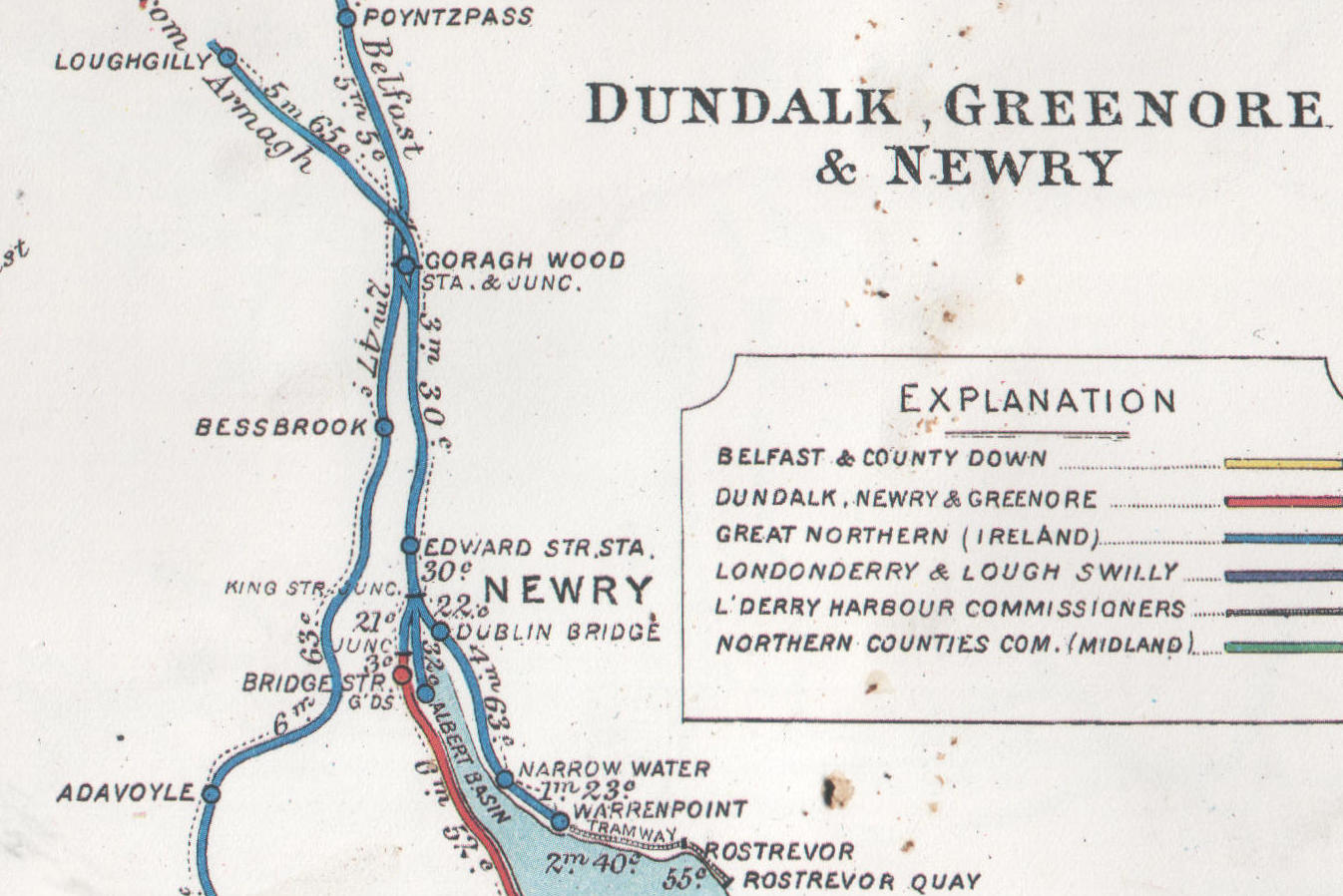
Railway between Newry and Warrenpoint and nearby railways

The Newry, Warrenpoint and Rostrevor Railway (NW&RR) was a former railway line linking Newry and the port of Warrenpoint on the Carlingford Lough inlet in Ireland, and the company operating it. The railway was absorbed into the Great Northern Railway of Ireland in 1886 and the line closed in 1965.

== History ==
Newry, Warrenpoint and Rostrevor Railway Act 1846
- Act of Parliament
- Parliament of the United Kingdom
- Long title: An Act for making a Railway from Newry in the Counties of Armagh and Down to Rostrevor in the County of Down, with a Branch to Warrenpoint in the same County.
- Citation: 9 & 10 Vict. c. ccxlv

Dates
- Royal assent: 27 July 1846

The NW&RR was incorporated by the Newry, Warrenpoint and Rostrevor Railway Act 1846 (9 & 10 Vict. c. ccxlv) on 27 July 1846 but was only able to reach the c.7 miles (11 km) to the port of Warrenpoint, the additional stretch to Rostrevor some 1 1/2 miles (2.4 km) further on was never to be built. (Note: While the aspired extension of the railway to Rostrevor was never occurred the Warrenpoint and Rostrevor Tramway horse-tramway was built as an alternative and operated between 1877 and 1915) The directors contracted William Dargan to construct the line which was completed in 1 1/2 years, publicly opening on 28 May 1849.

The line was not initially connected to any other. In 1864 the Newry and Armagh Railway (N&AR) (Note: The Newry and Armagh Railway was initially under the name of the Newry and Enniskillen Railway.) made a branch from Goraghwood on the Belfast to Dublin main line to their station at Edward Street. At the same time the NW&RR, who had recognised the need to connect to main Irish rail network since 1852, crossed the Newry (Clanrye) River and relocated northern terminus station from Kilmorey Street to Dublin Bridge. (Note: Cunningham & Abraham claim a swivel bridge was used to cross the Newry River c.1854. However it seems plausible a swivel bridge would have been more needed for the 1861 canal crossing than for a river crossing. Additionally Bairstow claims the Dublin Bridge station was not opened until 1861.) In the event following protracted negotiations with the Newry Navigation Company parliamentary permission was granted for the Town of Newry Connecting Railway Company to establish the line crossing the Newry Canal, the 1/4 mile (400 m) link costing £12,700 opening on 2 September 1861, and involving five level crossings.

On 1 August 1876 the Dundalk, Newry and Greenore Railway (DN&GR), backed by the London North Western Railway (LNWR) of England, opened their line to a temporary terminus at Newry Bridge Street, the connection Albert Street and the rest of the Network at Newry only opening 1 July 1880. (Note: Patterson claims the Newry to Greenore link opened in 1873.) The LNWR began their Holyhead to Greenore service on 2 August 1876, and Patterson observes the NW&RR would likely have realised it was then implausible that Warrenpoint, which had never really challenged Newry as a port, would ever establish itself for cross-channel trade.

Great Northern Railway (Ireland) Act 1886
- Act of Parliament
- Parliament of the United Kingdom
- Long title: An Act to enable the Great Northern Railway Company (Ireland) to purchase the Newry Warrenpoint and Rostrevor Railway and to confer further powers on the said Company and on other companies in relation to the undertaking of that Company; and for other purposes.
- Citation: 49 & 50 Vict. c. xli

Dates
- Royal assent: 4 June 1886

Text of statute as originally enacted

The enterprise was amalgamated into the Great Northern Railway (Ireland) by the Great Northern Railway (Ireland) Act 1886 (49 & 50 Vict. c. xli) of 4 June 1886. The GNRI provided an improved W. H. Mills-style station building in 1891. The line was transferred to the Ulster Transport Authority on 1 October 1958, with the final train from Warrenpoint running on 2 January 1965.
