= Waterford and Kilkenny Railway =

Railway company

Overview
- Owner: Waterford and Kilkenny Railway Company
- Locale: Ireland
- Termini: Waterford city; Mountmellick, County Laois

History
- Opened: 12 May 1848
- Closed: 1900

Technical
- Track gauge: 1,600 mm (5 ft 3 in)

Waterford and Kilkenny Railway incorporated 21 July 1845 by the Waterford and Kilkenny Railway Act 1845 (8 & 9 Vict. c. lxxxvii).

The aim was to create a series of railways which would connect Waterford, Cork, Dublin and Galway. The creation of such links was considered a good investment for the stock market but also intended to have a positive impact on businesses in Ireland and links to the rest of the UK.

== Kilkenny-Waterford Line ==
The first part of the rail line to be completed was the Kilkenny to Thomastown section. Work began in 1846 but the line didn't open until 12 May 1848 due to delays in waiting for other railway companies to finish connecting track. Thomastown station was a Tudor Revival building which opened 1848. The line reached Seapoint Hill in 1850 and the rest of the track to Waterford was completed in 1853 with the opening of the station at Dunkitt.

In 1850 the company applied for an act of Parliament, the Waterford and Kilkenny Railway Amendment Act 1850 (13 & 14 Vict. c. lxii) to allow them to raise further funds. The long term goal being the trunk line to the midlands.

Another act of Parliament, the Central Ireland Railways Act 1866 (29 & 30 Vict. c. cclvii) was put forward in 1866 to create new railway lines as a joint venture of the Waterford and Kilkenny Railway Company and the Kilkenny Junction Railway Company. In anticipation of the increased range of the Waterford and Kilkenny Railway company the name was changed to the Waterford and Central Ireland Railway by the Waterford and Central Ireland Railway Act 1868 (31 & 32 Vict. c. cxli). The line from Kilkenny only reached Maryborough in 1867. The line to Mountmellick was opened in 1883 and that was as far as the Waterford and Central Ireland Railway got.

The Waterford and Central Ireland Railway and the Kilkenny Junction Railway were amalgamated by the Central Ireland Railway Act 1896 (59 & 60 Vict. c. xvi).

In 1900, as a result of acts of Parliament, several important lines became part of the GS&WR system, including the Waterford and Central Ireland Railway and the Waterford, Limerick and Western Railway. In the case of the Waterford and Central Ireland Railway, this was by the Great Southern and Western, and Waterford and Central Ireland Railways Amalgamation Act 1900 (63 & 64 Vict. c. ccxlviii).

== Thomastown Viaduct ==
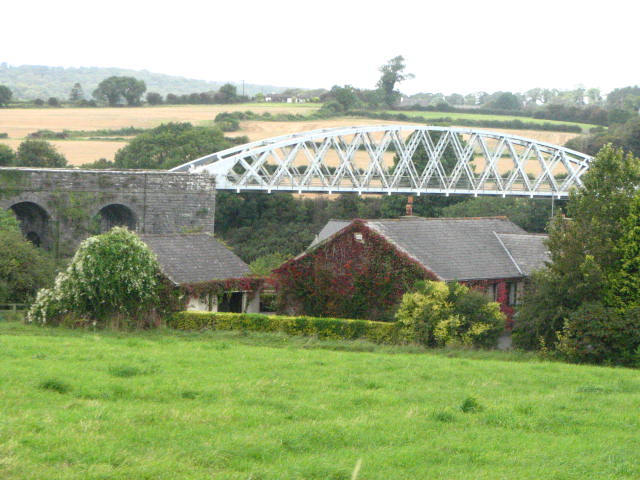
The Thomastown Viaduct

The line from Thomastown to Jerpoint Hill, completed in 1850, was the section which needed the viaduct across the river Nore. Captain William Moorsom was the engineer who designed the structure of lattice woodwork beginning the work in 1846. It was two hundred feet long and seventy-eight feet above the River Nore. At twenty-five feet wide, it was designed for two lines, although only one was built. When done was the longest single span viaduct in either Ireland or Great Britain.

The new viaduct had Charles Richard Galwey (1840–94) as the engineer. The iron structure was completed in 1877. It replaced an older wooden viaduct which was feared to be unstable and dangerous. Throughout the 1850s there were reports on the safety of the structure and while all agreed it was safe it was still recommended to replace it with an iron viaduct which would need less maintenance. The metal constraction was made by the Mallet foundry and the son of that family, Robert Mallet was one of the planner of the viaduct.

== List of legislation ==
- Waterford and Kilkenny Railway Act 1845
- Waterford and Kilkenny Railway Amendment Act 1850
- Kilkenny Junction Railway Act 1860
- Kilkenny Junction Railway Act 1861
- Kilkenny Junction Railway Act 1864
- Central Ireland Railways Act 1866
- Kilkenny Junction Railway (Abandonment of Kilpurcell Branch) Act 1867
- Waterford and Central Ireland Railway Act 1868
- Waterford and Central Ireland Railway Act 1872
- Waterford and Central Ireland Railway Act 1873
- Waterford and Central Ireland Railway Act 1875
- Central Ireland Railway Act 1896
- Great Southern and Western, and Waterford and Central Ireland Railways Amalgamation Act 1900

== See also ==
- History of rail transport in Ireland
