= Warrenpoint and Rostrevor Tramway =

Horse-drawn tramway service in Ireland

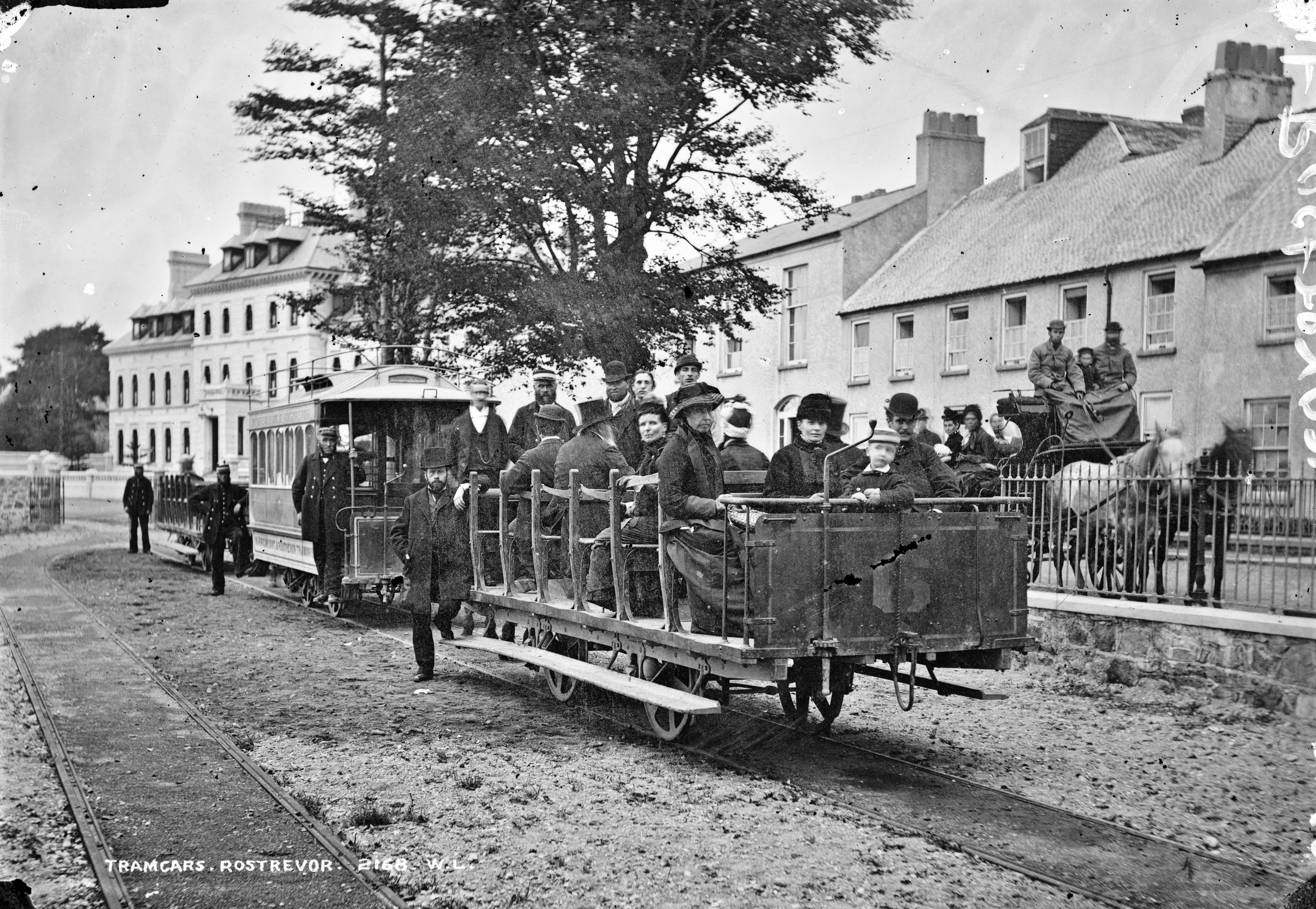
- Tramcars at Rostrevor

Operation
- Locale: Warrenpoint, Rostrevor
- Open: July 1877
- Close: February 1915
- Status: Closed

Infrastructure
- Track gauge: 3 ft (914 mm)
- Propulsion system: Horse

Statistics
- Route length: 3.3 miles (5.3 km)
Overview

The Warrenpoint and Rostrevor Tramway operated 3 ft (914 mm) narrow gauge, horse-drawn tramway services between Warrenpoint and Rostrevor, County Down, Ireland from 1877 to 1915.

== History ==
The Warrenpoint and Rostrevor Tramway offered passengers a connection from its canopied terminus platform at Warrenpoint railway station through to Rostrevor. The company was established in 1875 and services started in 1877. It was promoted by Francis Needham, 3rd Earl of Kilmorey. It was the first tramway service in Ireland. The Earl sold the tramway in 1884 for £4,000 (equivalent to £429,751 in 2025). In 1910, the manager was Bernard Reilly.

=== Fares ===
In 1890 the fares were

- 1st Class single 6d (equivalent to £2.78 in 2025)
- 1st Class return 9d (equivalent to £4.17 in 2025)
- 3rd Class single 4d (equivalent to £1.84 in 2025)
- 3rd Class return 6d (equivalent to £2.78 in 2025)

=== Extension plan ===
In 1908 plans were made to purchase the tramway, electrify it and extend it as far as Newcastle, County Down, however, these plans came to nothing.

== Closure ==
Early in 1915 a storm washed away part of the line and following this, the service never resumed.

== Images ==
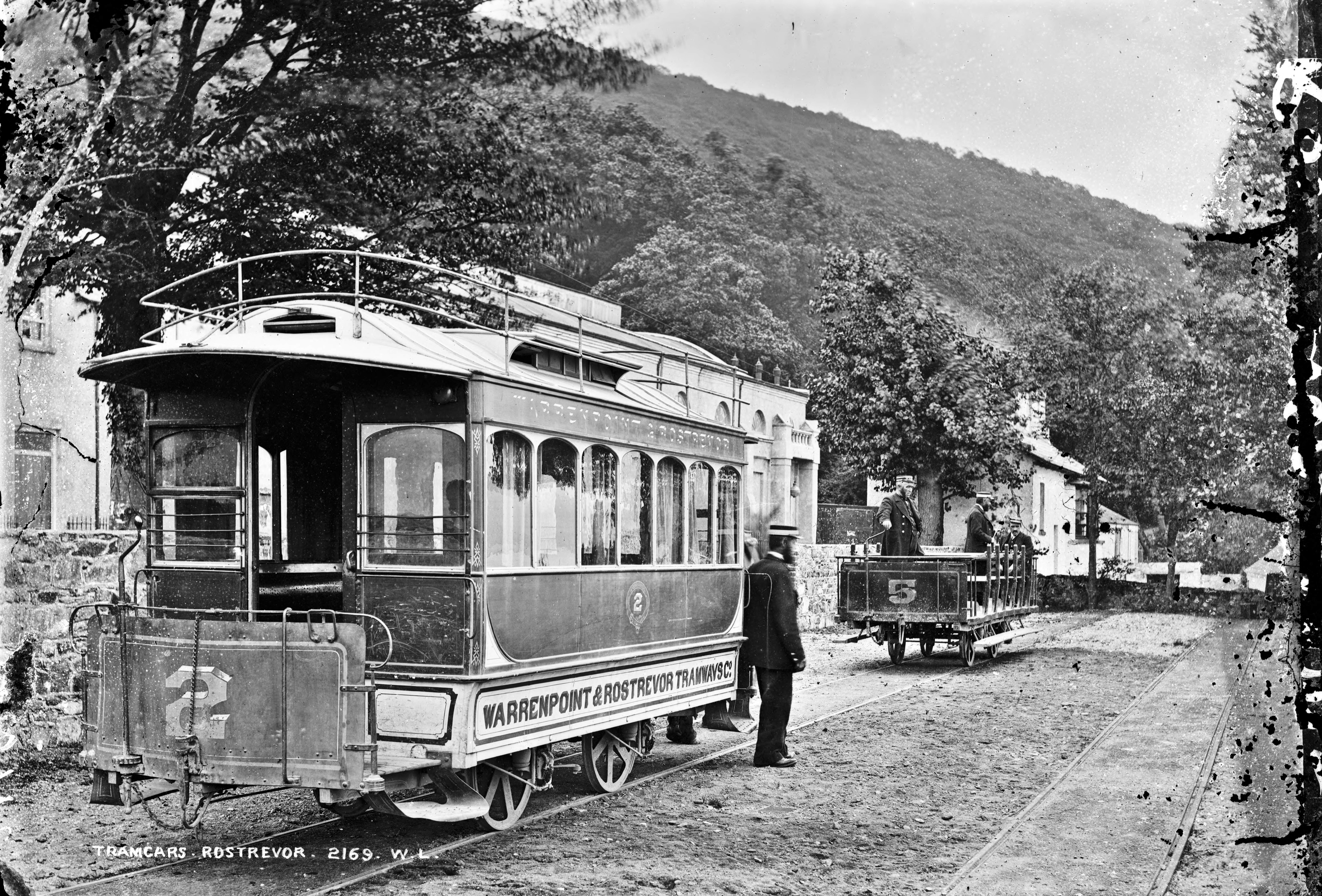
Two tramcars at the Mourne Hotel terminus in Rostrevor.

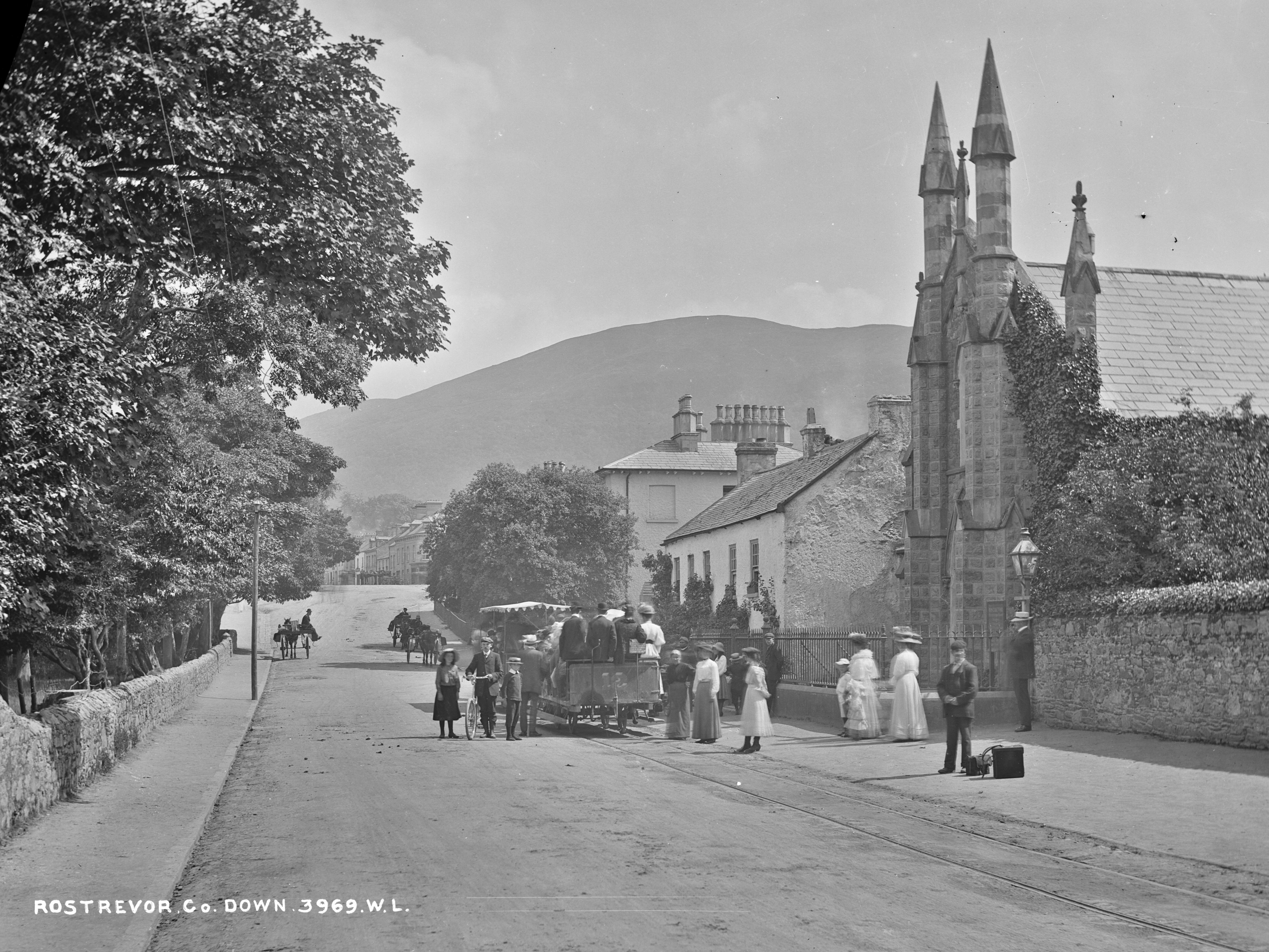
Two tramcars on a street in Rostrevor.

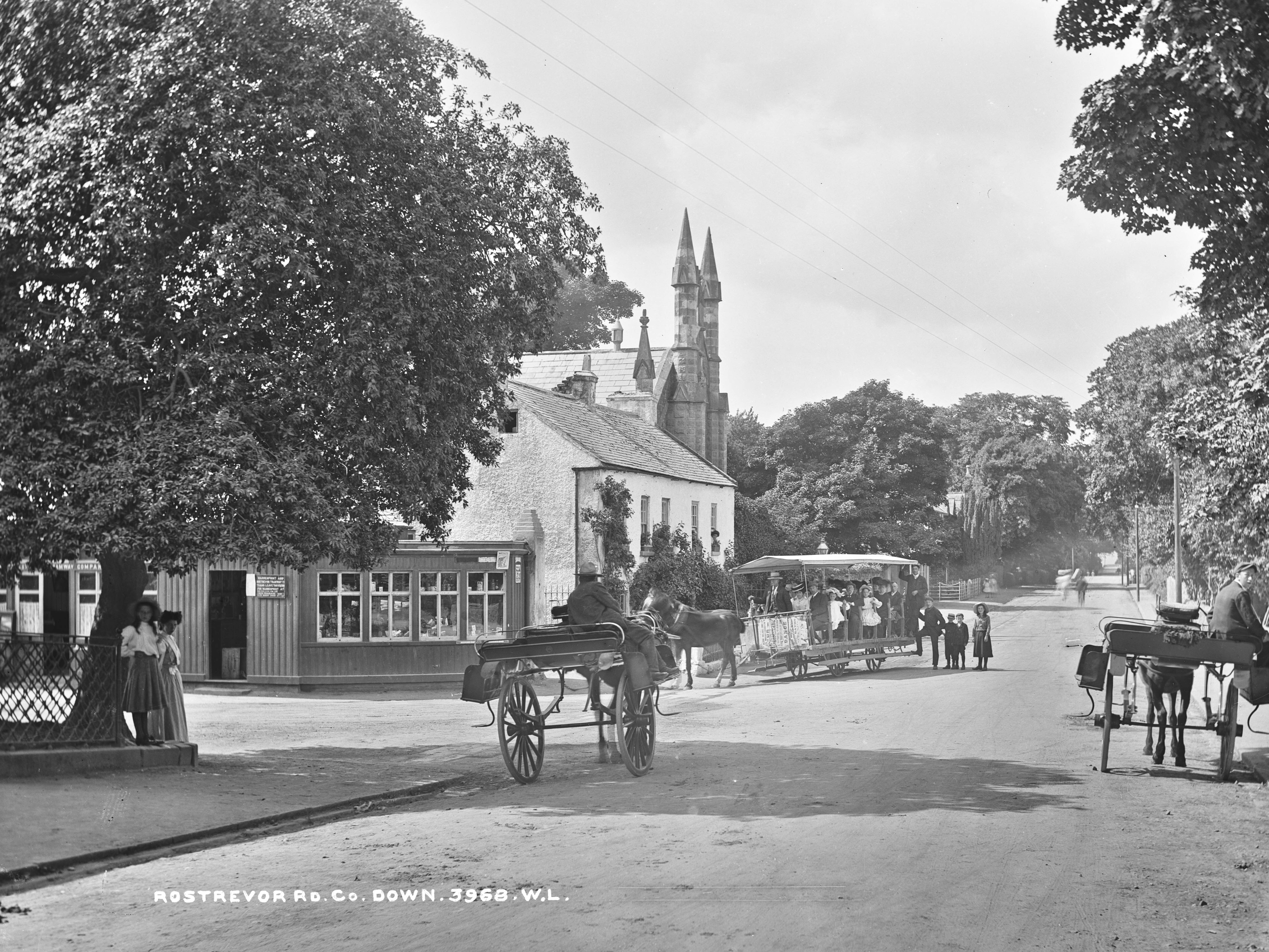
The same street viewed from the other direction. The building on the left appears to be the tramway company's office.

== See also ==
- Newry, Warrenpoint and Rostrevor Railway
