= Andrew Barclay Sons & Co. =

UK locomotive manufacturer

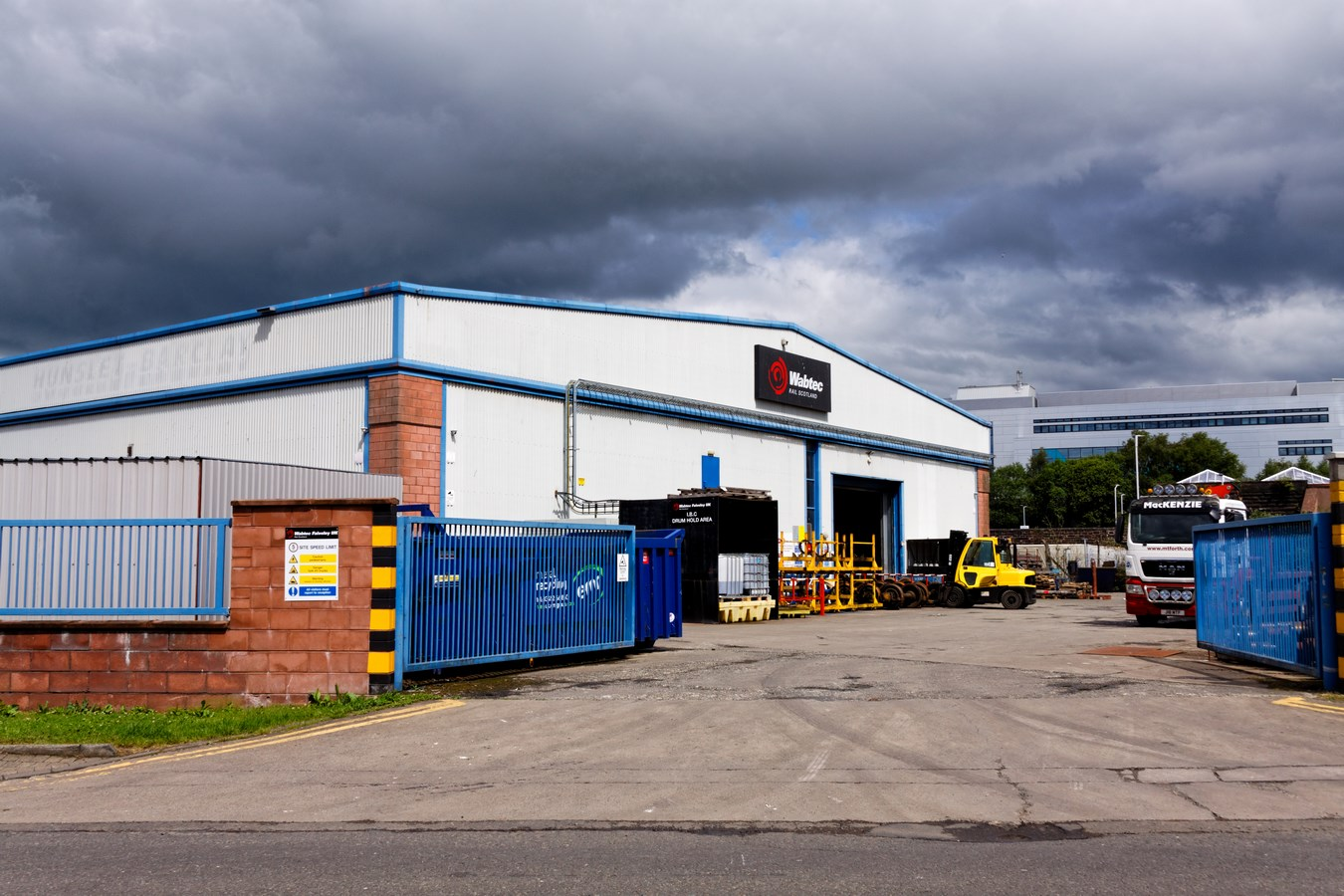
- Operating as Wabtec Rail Scotland
- Traded as: Brodie Engineering
- Industry: Engineering
- Predecessor: Barclays & Co.
- Founded: 1892
- Founder: Andrew Barclay
- Successor: Hunslet-Barclay (1972-2007); Brush-Barclay (2007-2011); Wabtec Rail Scotland (2011-2020); Brodie Engineering Ltd (2020–present)
- Headquarters: West Langland Street, Kilmarnock, Scotland
- Area served: Scotland
- Products: Locomotives
- Services: Locomotive repairs and maintenance
- Owner: Brodie Engineering Ltd.
- Website: brodie-engineering.co.uk

Andrew Barclay Sons & Co., currently operating as Brodie Engineering, is a railway engineering company, specialising in the heavy maintenance, refurbishment and overhauls for both passenger and freight rolling stock. Based around its works at Kilmarnock, it is the only active rail engineering business in Scotland.

The company's history can be traced back to the establishment of an engineering workshop in Kilmarnock in 1840 by Andrew Barclay. It produced numerous steam locomotives during the nineteenth century and, during the following century, it produced several fireless and diesel locomotives as well. Ownership of the company has been exchanged several times, having become a private limited company in 1892. It was acquired by the Hunslet Group during 1972, after which it was renamed Hunslet-Barclay.

During the twenty-first century, the business has changed hands multiple times, having been purchased by LH Group in December 2003, then becoming part of the FKI Group under the name Brush-Barclay during 2007. Four years later, both Brush Traction and Brush-Barclay were acquired by the multinational railway engineering company Wabtec. During July 2020, the Kilmarnock works was acquired and reopened by Brodie Engineering Ltd after Wabtec had opted to close down the site. In early 2024, Porterbrook took a stake in the business.

== History ==
=== Background ===
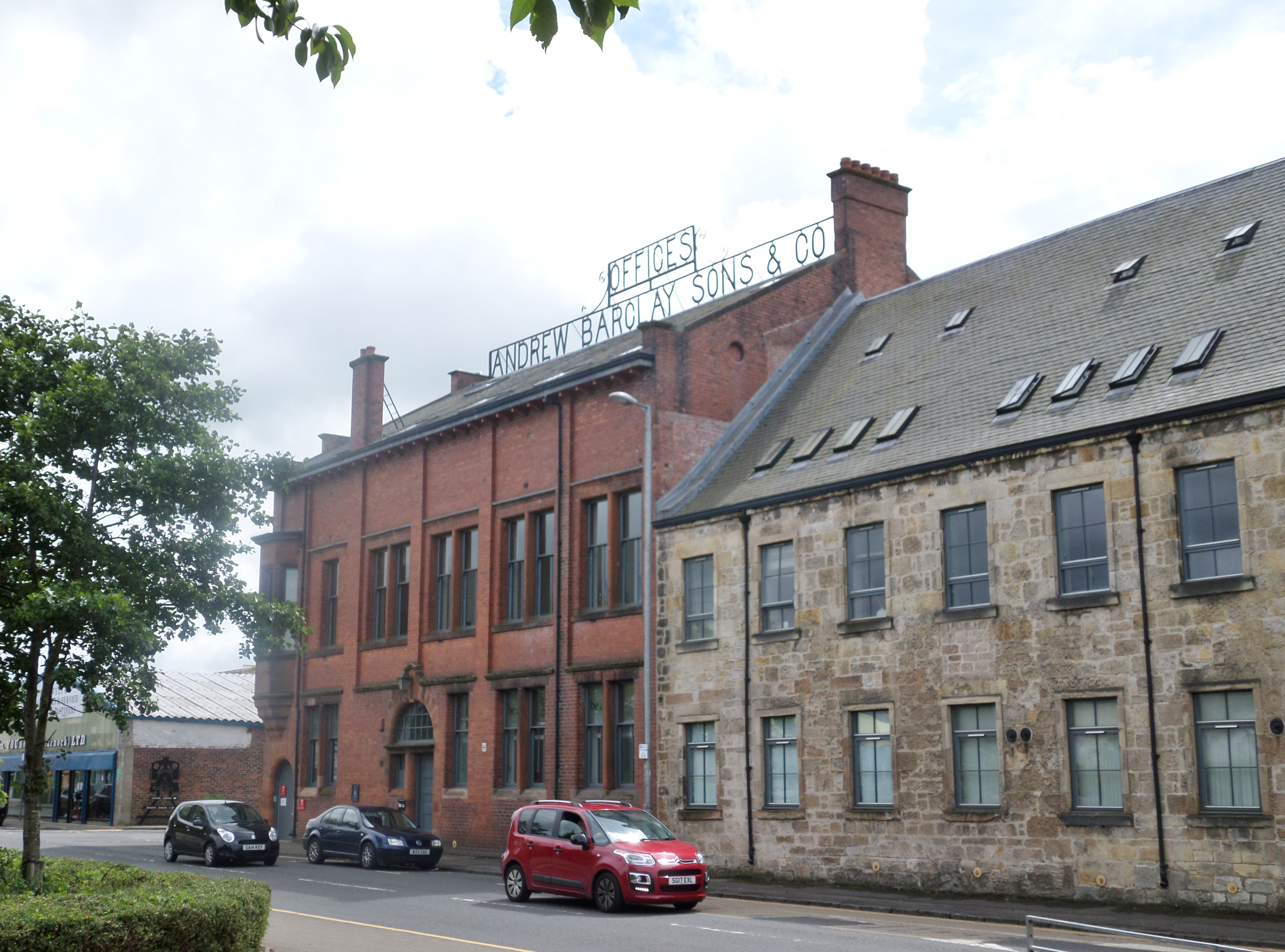
The former offices in West Langland Street is now the HQ of development company The KLIN Group

Born in 1814, Andrew Barclay was only 25 years of age when he set up a partnership with Thomas McCulloch to manufacture mill shafts in Kilmarnock, East Ayrshire, Scotland. Several years later, Barclay chose to branch out on his own to manufacture his patented gas lamps. During 1847, he set up workshops specializing in the manufacture of winding engines for the local coal mining industry. However, the money from the sale of a patent granted to the company's gas lamp design was never paid, leading to sequestration of the company during the following year.

By 1859, Barclay had recovered from this setback and his newly formed company produced its first steam locomotive. Sometime around 1871, Barclay set up a second locomotive building business known as Barclays & Co, which he had set up for his younger brother, John, and his four son, yet this business remained closely associated with Andrew Barclay. Neither company enjoyed good fortunes, as they were both declared bankrupt in 1874 and 1882 respectively. Four years after this latest collapse, Andrew Barclay's business was relaunched as Andrew Barclay Sons & Co. Later on, Barclays & Co was also revived. During 1892, the firm became a private limited company as Andrew Barclay Sons & Co., Ltd. Just two years later, Andrew was removed from control of the company which bore his name by its shareholders, after which he sued the company for unpaid wages, a matter which was settled out of court five years later.

During 1930, the company purchased a rival engine making business, John Cochrane (Barrhead) Ltd. In 1963, it acquired the goodwill of the North British Locomotive Company, Glasgow.

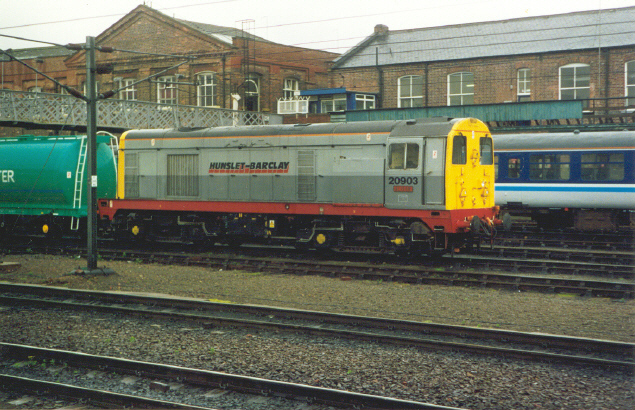
A Hunslet-Barclay class 20 at Doncaster in 1994

In 1972, the company was acquired by the Leeds-based Hunslet Group of companies and its name was changed in 1989 to Hunslet-Barclay Ltd. As such, it operated six ex-British Rail Class 20 diesels to provide motive power for weed-killing trains used on the national rail network. Its manufacturing output in this period included eight additional centre trailer cars for the Glasgow Subway, which were delivered in 1992.

=== Twenty-first century ===
The locomotive interests of Hunslet-Barclay were purchased by the Staffordshire-based conglomerate LH Group on 31 December 2003; thereafter, Hunslet-Barclay at Kilmarnock continuing in the business of design, manufacture and refurbishment of multiple units, rolling stock, bogies and wheel-sets. Several Barclay locomotives were supplied through Lennox Lange, who acted as an agent for Barclay.

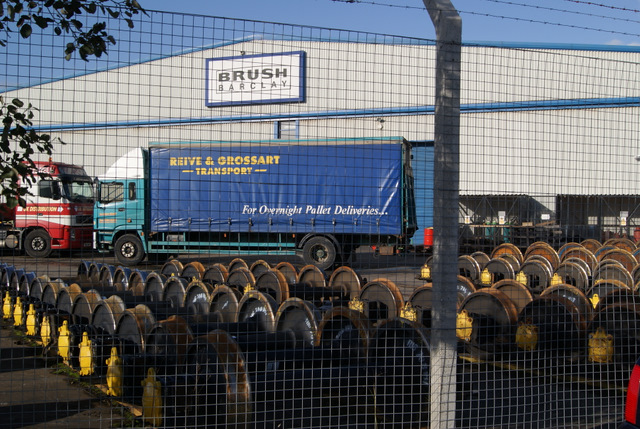
The plant under Brush-Barclay ownership

During 2007, the company's poor financial position compelled it into administration. Shortly thereafter, the company was acquired by the Loughborough-based engineering company Brush Traction through its parent, the FKI Group. To reflect its change in ownership, it was rebranded as Brush-Barclay.

On 28 February 2011, Wabtec announced that it had acquired Brush Traction for US$31 million. Accordingly, the Kilmarnock works became Wabtec Rail Scotland.

During early 2020, Wabtec announced its intention to close the Kilmarnock works and put it up for sale. Several months later, the Kilmarnock firm Brodie Engineering acquired the site, after which it started operating two facilities within Kilmarnock, the other being at the Bonnyton Rail Depot within the Bonnyton Industrial Estate.

During February 2024, it was announced that the rolling stock company Porterbrook had agreed terms to purchase a 49 percent stake in Brodie Engineering; this move was promoted as bolstering support for multiple train operating companies.

== Products ==
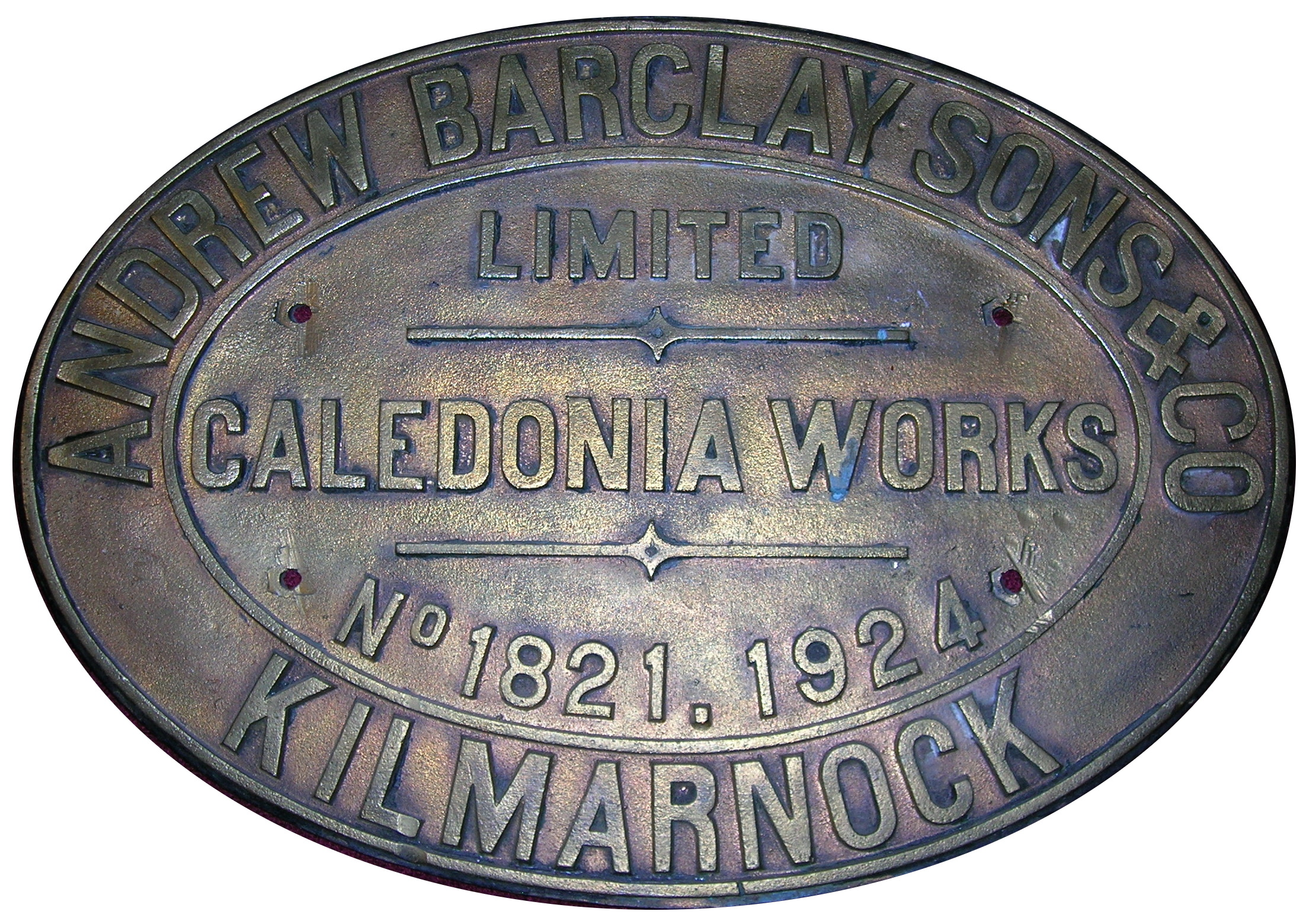
A brass makers plate from an 0-4-0 Andrew Barclay locomotive of 1925 which worked at a Mauchline colliery in Scotland

=== Saddle tanks ===
The company was noted for constructing simple robust locomotives, chiefly for industrial use, and many of its products survive in use on heritage railways, over 100 in Britain. A typical product would be an 0-4-0 with squared-off saddle tank.

=== Fireless locomotives ===
Barclay was the largest builder of fireless locomotives in Britain, building 114 of them between 1913 and 1961. They were used in munitions factories during WW1, and the closure of the Gretna munitions factory at the end of WW1 saw an 0-4-0 Barclay fireless loco of 2 foot gauge, and two 0-6-0 Barclay fireless locos of standard-gauge up for tender. Few fireless locomotives are seen in action today. This is due to the low power of the locomotives, the long time needed to charge a locomotive from cold and the low steam pressures available for charging. Perhaps the only exception was "Lord Ashfield" (Andrew Barclay works no. 1989 of 1930) at the Museum of Science and Industry in Manchester that ran for a while in the 1990s sharing a steam supply with the stationary exhibits in their exhibition hall.

=== Diesel locomotives ===
The company built diesel shunting locomotives for industry and for British Rail. Classes included British Rail Class D2/5, British Rail Class 01 and British Rail Class 06.

=== Export ===
Over 80 Andrew Barclay locomotives were supplied to railways in Ireland (Irish Turf Board/Bord na Móna), Australia, New Zealand, Fiji and Sri Lanka (Sri Lanka Port Authority).

== Preservation ==
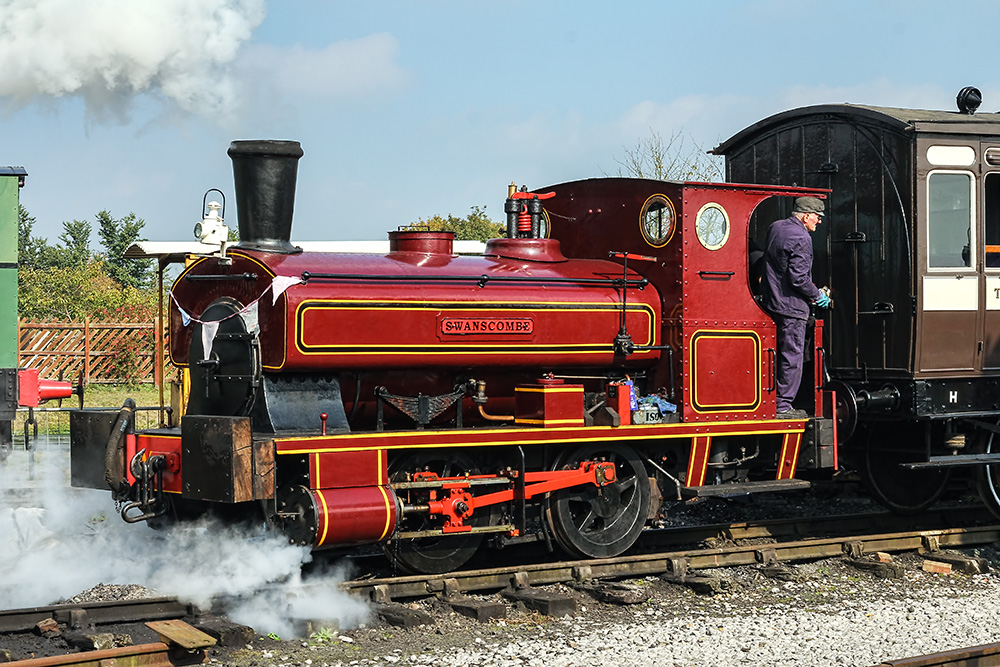
699 "Swanscombe" is the oldest surviving Andrew Barclay locomotive, dating from 1891.

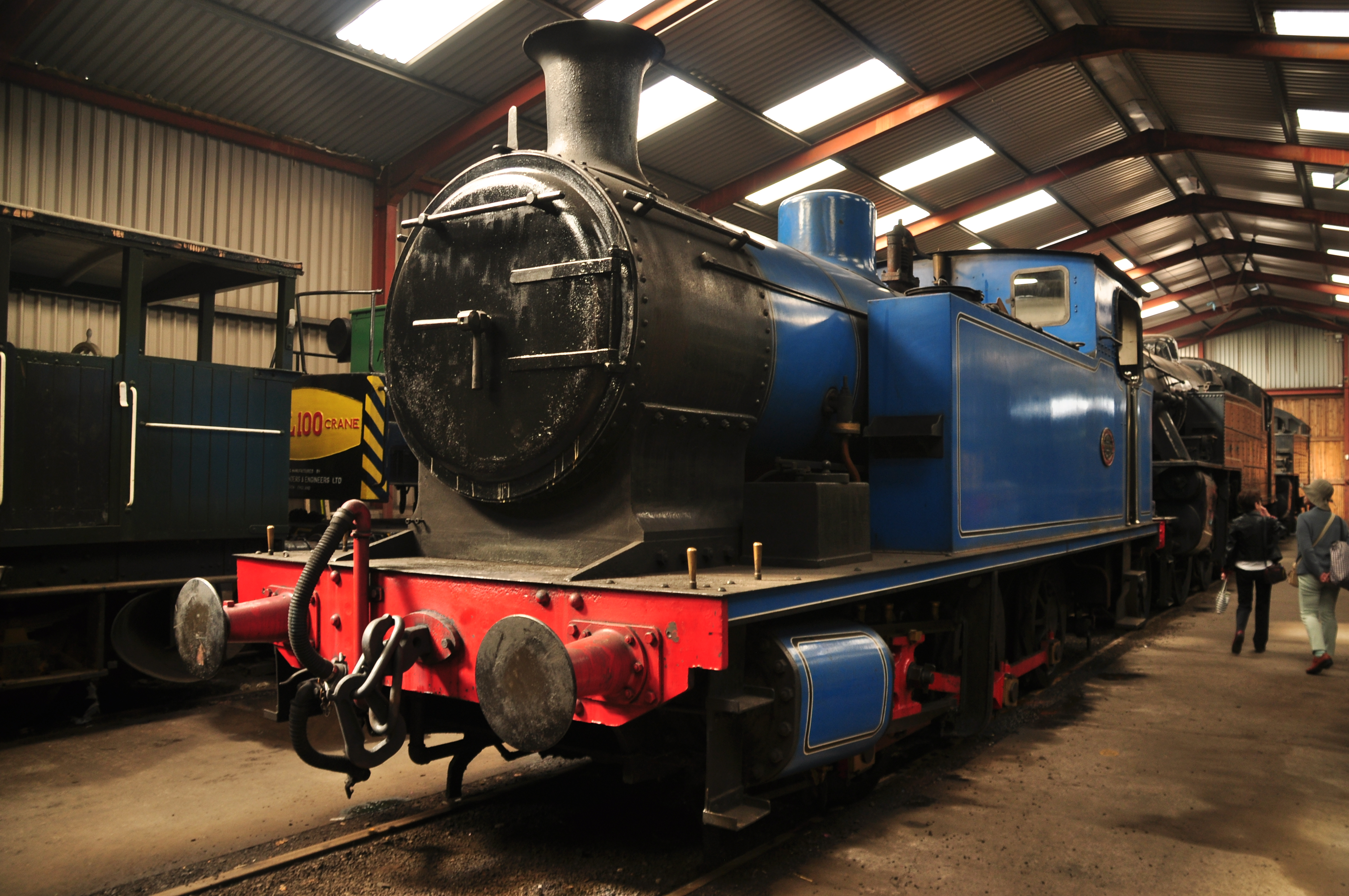
1245 represents the 0-6-0 side tank locomotives built by Andrew Barclay.

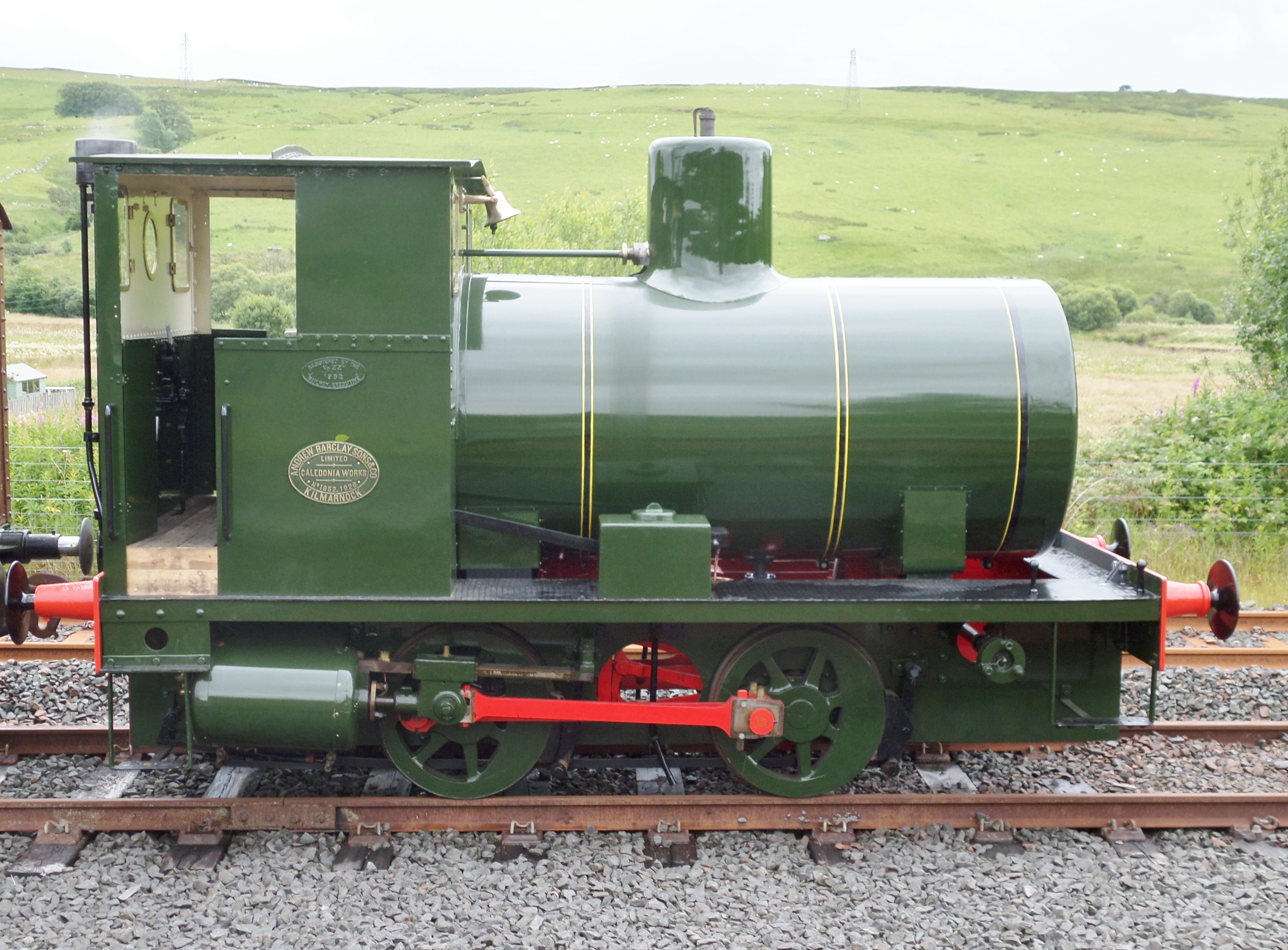
1952 is the only operational Fireless Andrew Barclay in the UK.

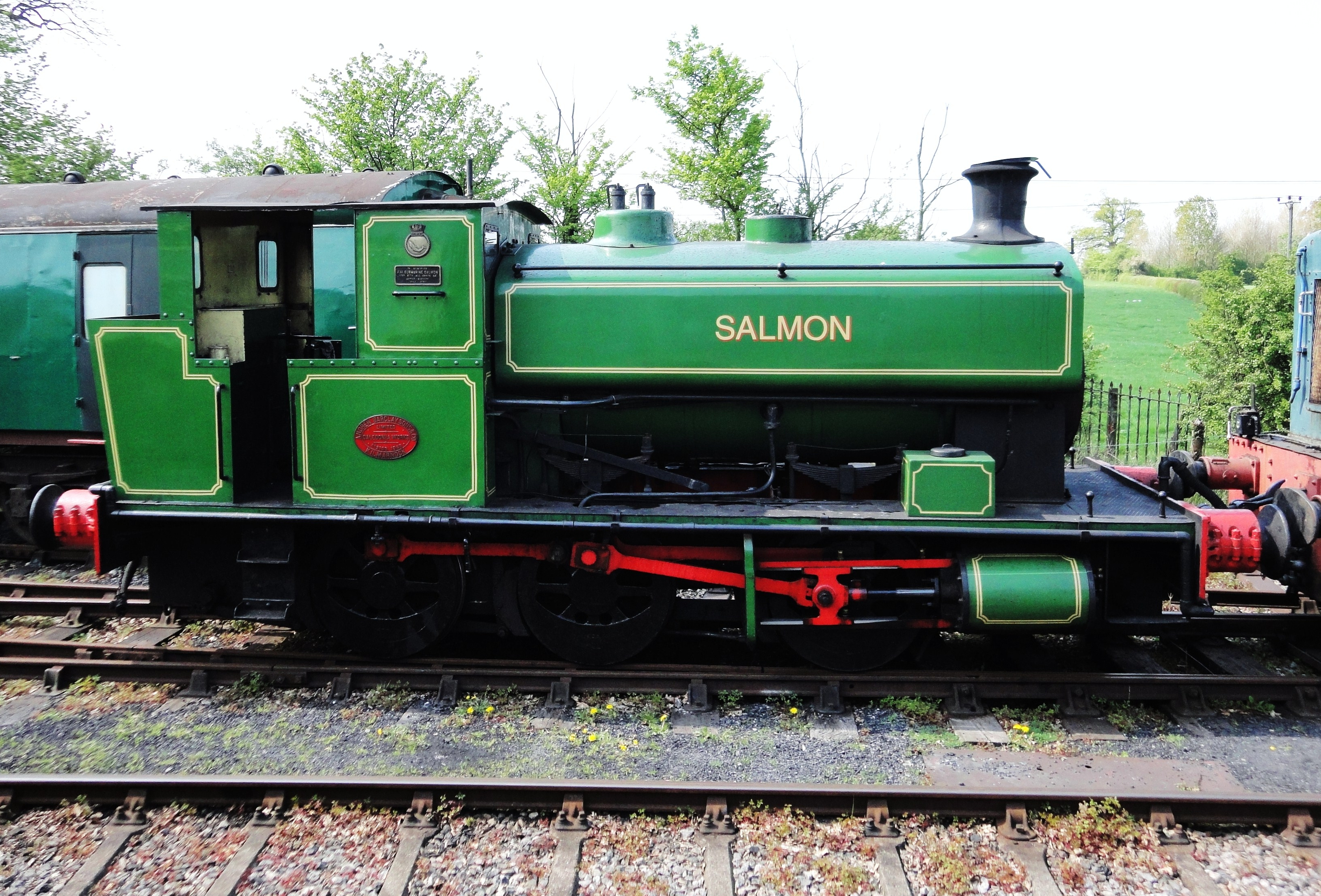
2139 "Salmon" is one of the 0-6-0 Andrew Barclay saddle tanks.

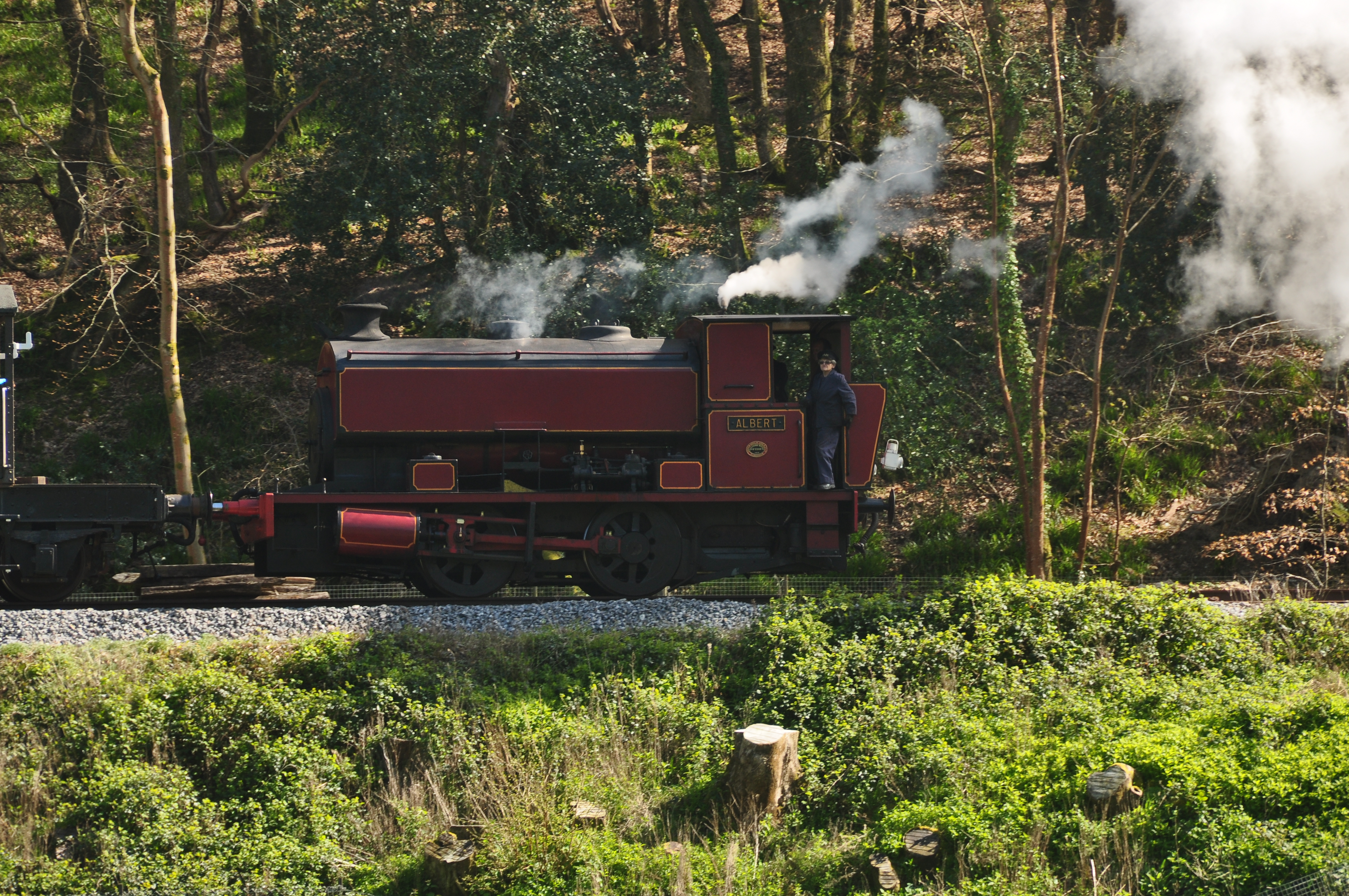
2248 "Albert" is a representative of the more powerful 16 inch Andrew Barclay 0-4-0 saddle tanks.

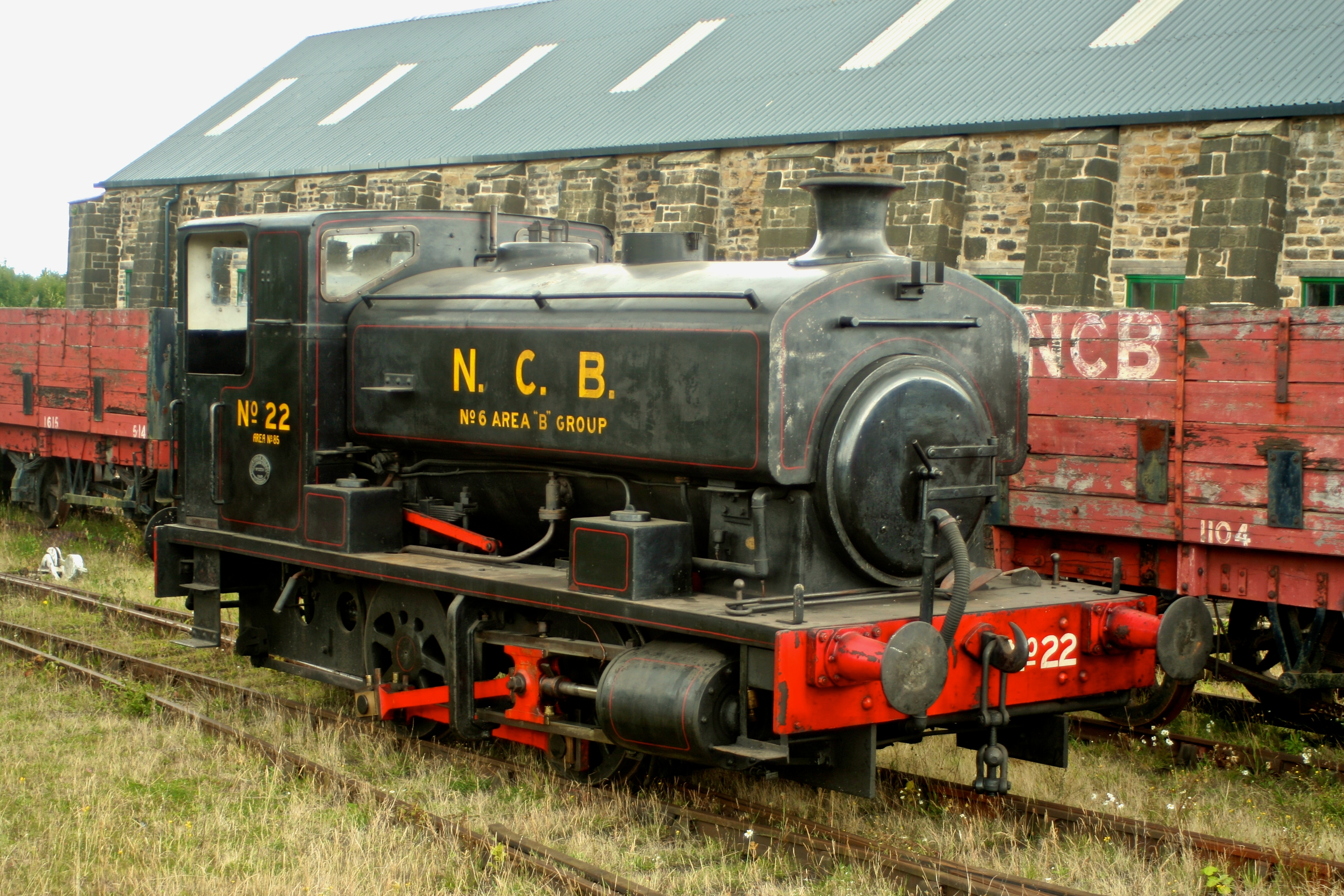
2274 (NCB No. 22) is a representative of the 14 inch Andrew Barclay 0-4-0 saddle tanks.

A large number of various ABS&Co locomotives have been preserved, proving popular on many Heritage Railways and Railway Centres, as listed below.

== Standard Gauge ==
=== Steam Locomotives ===
- No' 699 "Swanscombe" - Preserved and running at the Buckinghamshire Railway Centre, Quainton Road in Buckinghamshire
- No' 776 "Firefly" - Preserved and under restoration on the Northampton and Lamport Railway in Northampton.
- No' 782 "Kinlet" - Preserved and on display at Blists Hill Victorian Town
- No' 807 "Bon Accord" - Preserved and running on the Royal Deeside Railway in Scotland
- No' 826 - Built in 1898. The buyer was Davis & Soper of London, presumably an agent for “The Corporation of the City of Cape Town” (Municipality). Preserved and on display on Table Mountain in South Africa.
- No' 880 Crane Tank "Glenfield No' 1" - Preserved and currently awaiting restoration at the Ribble Steam Railway in Lancashire
- No' 885 - Preserved and awaiting restoration at the Cambrian Heritage Railway in Oswestry, Shropshire
- No' 945 "Annie" - Preserved and currently under overhaul at the Whitwell and Reepham Railway in Norfolk
- No' 1015 "Horden" - Preserved and currently under restoration at Tanfield Railway in County Durham, North-East England
- No' 1047 "Storefield" - Preserved and running at the East Anglian Railway Museum in Essex
- No' 1142 NCB "No' 29" - Preserved and undergoing restoration by the Shed 47 railway restoration group in Scotland
- No' 1147 "John Howe" - Preserved and on Display on the Ribble Steam Railway in Lancashire
- No' 1116 Dalemellington "No' 16" - Preserved and on Display at the Scottish Industrial Railway Centre in Scotland
- No' 1175 NCB "No' 8 Dardanelles" - Preserved and on Display at Polkemmet Country Park in Scotland
- No' 1193 Lady Victoria Colliery "No' 6" - Preserved and awaiting restoration at the Tanfield Railway in County Durham, North-East England
- No' 1219 "Caledonia Works" - Preserved and running on the West Somerset Railway in Somerset
- No' 1223 "Colin McAndrew" - Preserved and on Display on the Mountsorrel Railway in Leicestershire
- No' 1245 - Preserved and running on the Lakeside and Haverthwaite Railway in Cumbria
- No' 1260 "Forester" - Preserved and undergoing restoration on the Pontypool and Blaenavon Railway in Wales
- No' 1338 Dalmellington Iron Co. "No' 17" - Preserved and awaiting a major overhaul at the Llangollen Railway in North-East Wales
- No’ 1385 “Rosyth No. 1” - Preserved and running on the Pontypool and Blaenavon Railway in Wales
- No' 1398 "Lord Fisher" - Preserved and running at the Yeovil Railway Centre in Somerset
- No' 1458 "No' 3 Lady Victoria" - Preserved and awaiting restoration at the Bo'ness and Kinneil Railway in Scotland
- No' 1472 "Bluebottle" - Preserved and on Display at the Bressingham Steam and Gardens in Norfolk
- No' 1473 "Sir Charles" - Preserved and on Display at the Swansea Industrial and Maritime Museum in Wales
- No' 1477 - Preserved and on Static Display at the Buckinghamshire Railway Centre
- No' 1550 "Sir James" - Now on Static Display at HM Factory, Gretna
- No' 1572 Heysham "No' 1 Lancaster" - Preserved and awaiting restoration at Carnforth in Lancashire
- No' 1598 "Efficient" - Preserved and on Display at the Ribble Steam Railway in Lancashire
- No' 1605 "W38 Ajax" - Preserved and awaiting overhaul at the Northampton and Lamport Railway
- No' 1614 Dalmellington "No' 19" - Preserved and awaiting restoration at the Scottish Industrial Railway Centre in Scotland
- No' 1619 NCB "Toto No' 6" - Preserved and undergoing restoration at the Mangapps Railway Museum in Essex
- No' 1659 "No' 32" - Preserved and undergoing overhaul at the Cromford and High Peak Railway in Derbyshire
- No' 1680 "Nora No' 5" - Preserved and currently static at the Big Pit National Coal Museum, in Wales
- No' 1719 "Lady Nan" - Preserved and running on the East Somerset Railway in Somerset
- No' 1823 "Harry" - Preserved and awaiting restoration at the Pontypool and Blaenavon Railway in Wales
- No' 1833 "Niddrie" - Preserved and under restoration at the Ribble Steam Railway in Lancashire
- No' 1863 - Preserved and running at the Caledonian Railway (Brechin) in Scotland
- No' 1865 "Alexander" - Preserved and on Display at the Ribble Steam Railway in Lancashire
- No' 1874 "Maite" - Preserved at the Basque Railway Museum in Azpeitia, Spain
- No' 1875 Crane Tank "Stanton No' 24" - Preserved and on Display inside the Matthew Kirtley Museum, on the Midland Railway – Butterley in Derbyshire
- No' 1876 - Preserved and on Display at the Sittingbourne and Kemsley Light Railway in Kent
- No' 1889 Aberdeen Gas Works "No' 3" - Preserved and on Display at the Grampian Transport Museum in Scotland
- No' 1890 Granton Gasworks "Forth No' 10" - Preserved and running on the Fife Heritage Railway in Scotland
- No' 1927 B.C.G.D "No' 1" - Preserved and on Display at the Bury Transport Museum in Greater Manchester
- No' 1931 - Preserved and running at the Rutland Railway Museum near Leicestershire
- No' 1937 Clyde's Mill "No' 3" - Preserved and on Display at the Bo'ness and Kinneil Railway in Scotland
- No' 1950 "Heysham No. 2" - Preserved and on Display at the Ribble Steam Railway in Lancashire
- No' 1952 Shell Refining "No' 8" - Preserved and running at the Scottish Industrial Railway Centre in Scotland
- No' 1964 "Spitfire" - Preserved and running on the Lincolnshire Wolds Railway in Lincolnshire
- No' 1969 "JN Derbyshire" - Preserved and on Display at the Ribble Steam Railway in Lancashire
- No' 1984 "Boots No' 1" - Preserved and undergoing restoration at the West Somerset Railway in Somerset
- No' 1989 "Lord Ashfield" - Preserved and awaiting overhaul at the Bo'ness and Kinneil Railway in Scotland
- No' 2008 "Boots No' 2" - Preserved and on Display inside the Matthew Kirtley Museum, on the Midland Railway – Butterley in Derbyshire
- No' 2015 "Tom Parry" Preserved and awaiting restoration at Pontypool and Blaenavon Railway in Wales
- No' 2017 "Braeriach No' 17" - Preserved and awaiting overhaul at the Strathspey Railway in Scotland
- No' 2020 Balmenach Distillery "No' 2" - Preserved and awaiting overhaul at the Strathspey Railway in Scotland
- No' 2043 NCB "No' 6" - Preserved and running at the Bo'ness and Kinneil Railway in Scotland
- No' 2047 "No' 705" - Preserved and running on the Plym Valley Railway in Devon
- No' 2046 British Aluminium Co. "No' 3" - Preserved and awaiting restoration at the Bo'ness and Kinneil Railway in Scotland
- No’ 2068 “No’ 20” ex Wemyss - Preserved and awaiting overhaul at the Bo'ness and Kinneil Railway in Scotland
- No’ 2069 “Little Barford”
- No' 2073 "Dailuaine No' 1" - Preserved and on display at Aberfeldy distillery in Scotland
- No' 2074 "Llantarnam Abbey" - Preserved at the Pontypool and Blaenavon Railway in Wales, returned to steam in 2026
- No' 2086 Royal Ordinance Factory "Drake" - Preserved and on Display at Andrew Barclay Railway Centre in Scotland
- No' 2088 "Sir Thomas Royden" - Preserved and running at the Rutland Railway Museum near Leicestershire
- No' 2107 "Harlaxton" - Preserved and running on the Caledonian Railway (Brechin) in Scotland
- No' 2126 Fireless Locomotive "CEGB No' 1" - Preserved at the Vale of Berkeley Railway, Sharpness
- No' 2127 Crane Tank "No' 6" - Preserved and currently on display in the museum at the Bo'ness and Kinneil Railway in Scotland
- No' 2134 British Gypsum "W.T.T." - Preserved and stored at Carnforth in Lancashire
- No' 2138 "Swordfish" - Preserved and running on the Swindon and Cricklade Railway in Wiltshire
- No' 2139 "Salmon" - Preserved on the Royal Deeside Railway in Scotland, undergoing a major overhaul offsite
- No' 2157 "Fambridge" - Undergoing overhaul at the Swindon and Cricklade Railway in Wiltshire – owned by Bristol & Somerset Locomotive Company Limited
- No' 2168 "Edmundsons" - Preserved and under overhaul at the Rushden Transport Museum in Northamptonshire
- No' 2183 "Earl David No' 15" - Preserved and running on the Avon Valley Railway in Gloucestershire
- No' 2199 - Preserved and running at the Whitwell and Reepham Railway in Norfolk
- No' 2201 "Victory" - Preserved and awaiting restoration at the Pontypool and Blaenavon Railway in Wales
- No' 2217 "Henry Ellison" - Preserved and running on the Ecclesbourne Valley Railway in Derbyshire
- No' 2219 NCB "No' 17" - Preserved and awaiting overhaul at the Prestongrange Museum in Scotland
- No' 2220 "Invicta" - Preserved and under restoration at the Chatham Historic Dockyard Railway in Kent
- No' 2221 - Preserved and awaiting restoration at the Dean Forest Railway in Gloucestershire
- No' 2226 "Katie" - Preserved and awaiting a major overhaul at the Churnet Valley Railway in Staffordshire
- No' 2230 Cook and Nuttall "No' 1 Hurricane" - preserved and undergoing overhaul at Carnforth in Lancashire
- No' 2238 BP Chemicals - Preserved and on Display at the Welsh Industrial and Maritime Museum in Wales
- No' 2239 "Mr Therm" - Preserved and on static display at Seaton Park in Aberdeen, Scotland
- No' 2243 - Preserved and on Static Display at the Buckinghamshire Railway Centre
- No' 2244 NCB "No' 10" - Preserved and running at the Scottish Industrial Railway Centre in Scotland
- No' 2248 "Albert" - Preserved and under overhaul on the Plym Valley Railway in Devon
- No' 2258 "Tiny" - Preserved and on Display at the Keighley and Worth Valley Railway in Yorkshire
- No' 2260 NCB "No' 23" - Preserved and on Display at the Scottish Industrial Railway Centre in Scotland
- No' 2264 "Fife Flyer No' 6" - Preserved and running at the Cambrian Heritage Railway in Oswestry, Shropshire
- No' 2268 Glaxo Laboratories "Glaxo" - Preserved and awaiting restoration at Carnforth
- No' 2274 NCB "No' 22" - Preserved and awaiting overhaul on the Bowes Railway, Tyne & Wear, North-East England
- No' 2284 NCB "No' 21" - Preserved and awaiting overhaul at the Lady Victoria Colliery in Scotland
- No' 2292 NCB "No' 21" -Preserved and undergoing restoration at the Fife Heritage Railway in Scotland
- No' 2296 NCB "No' 17" - Preserved and undergoing restoration at the Scottish Vintage Bus Museum in Scotland
- No' 2315 - Preserved at the Mid-Suffolk Light Railway, operational as of 2026
- No' 2320 NCB "No' 22" - Preserved and under overhaul at the Embsay and Bolton Abbey Steam Railway, in North Yorkshire
- No' 2323 - preserved and under restoration at Northampton and Lamport Railway in Northamptonshire
- No' 2333 "David" - Preserved and under overhaul at the Lakeside and Haverthwaite Railway in the Lake District
- No' 2335 NCB "No' 24" - Preserved and on Display at the Bo'ness and Kinneil Railway in Scotland
- No' 2343 "British Gypsum No'4" - Preserved and currently awaiting restoration at the Ribble Steam Railway in Lancashire
- No' 2350 "Belvoir" - Preserved and awaiting restoration at the Rutland Railway Museum near Leicestershire
- No' 2352 GEPG Goldington "No. 67 Hong Kong Flyer" - Preserved and undergoing restoration at the Tanat Valley Railway in Shropshire
- No' 2354 "Richard Trevithick" - Preserved and undergoing overhaul on the Swindon and Cricklade Railway in Wiltshire
- No' 2358 NCB "No' 25" - Preserved and awaiting restoration at the Scottish Industrial Railway Centre in Scotland
- No' 2360 "Brian Harrison No' 3" - Preserved and running on the Ecclesbourne Valley Railway in Derbyshire
- No' 2361 "W.S.T" - Preserved and awaiting an overhaul on the Bowes Railway in Tyne & Wear, North-East England
- No' 2368 NCB "No' 1" - Preserved and awaiting restoration at the Scottish Industrial Railway Centre in Scotland
- No' 2369 - Preserved and under overhaul at the Appleby Frodingham Railway Preservation Society in Lincolnshire
- No' 2373 Imperial Paper Mills "No' 1" - preserved and on Display at the National Railway Museum in York
- No' ? Fireless ex CEGB Castle Meads Power Station, Gloucester − Preserved and displayed at Gloucester Docks.

=== Diesel Locomotives ===
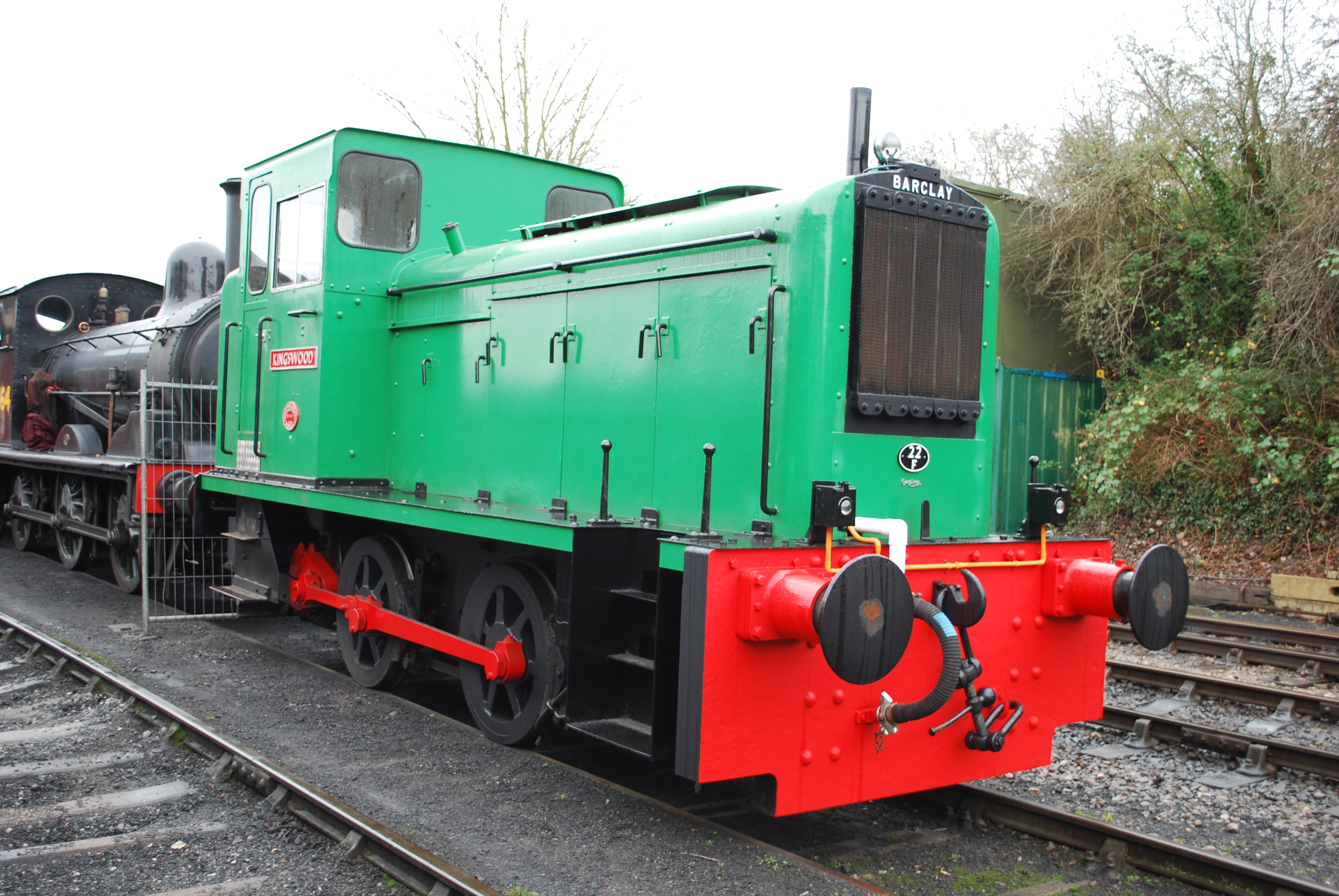
446 "Kingswood" operates as a yard shunter at the Avon Valley Railway

- No' 333 "John Peel" - Preserved and operates at the East Anglia Railway Museum, in Essex.
- No' 343 - Preserved and on display, at the Bo'ness and Kinneil Railway in Scotland.
- No' 347 "Powfoot No' 1" - Preserved and operational at the Scottish Industrial Railway Centre.
- No' 349 - Preserved and operates on the Leiston Works Railway, in Suffolk.
- No' 354 - Preserved and operational on the Lavender Line, in Sussex.
- No' 357/WD42 "Overlord" - Preserved and operational, at the Chatham Historic Dockyard Railway, in Kent.
- No' 358/WD 70043 "Grumpy" - Preserved and operational, at the Avon Valley Railway, in Gloucestershire.
- No' 363/WD 70048 - Preserved and operational, at the Rushden, Higham and Wellingborough Railway in Northamptonshire.
- No' 369/Army 235 - Preserved and operational, at the Isle of Wight Steam Railway.
- No' 376 "Princess Margaret" - Preserved and undergoing overhaul, at Tyseley Locomotive Works in Birmingham.
- DM No' 399 - Preserved and undergoing overhaul at the Scottish Industrial Railway Centre.
- DM No' 400 "Duke of Edinburgh" "Bardon No 28" - Preserved and operated by Georail Services Ltd in Cheshire.
- No' 415 - Preserved and operational on the Keith and Dufftown Railway.
- No' 416 - Preserved and currently being overhauled on the Midland Railway – Butterley in Derbyshire.
- No' 422 "Hot Wheels" - Preserved, but currently stored out of use on the Battlefield Line Railway in Leicestershire.
- No' 440 "Meaford No' 2" - Preserved and operational at the Embsay and Bolton Abbey Steam Railway, in North Yorkshire.
- No' 441 - Preserved and currently undergoing repairs on the Midland Railway – Butterley in Derbyshire.
- No' 446 "Kingswood" - Preserved and operational on the Helston Railway, in Cornwall.
- No' 472 - Preserved and stored out of use at the Summerlee, Museum of Scottish Industrial Life.
- No' 486 "Clive" No' 4 - Preserved and currently being overhauled at the Foxfield Railway, in Staffordshire.
- No' 499 - Operational at W.H. Davis in Shirebrook.
- No' 506 - Stored at C.F. Booth's scrapyard in Rotherham.
- No' 517 "Power of Enterprise" - Preserved, though currently stored out of use on the Strathspey Railway.
- No' 552 "F.G.F. British Gypsum" - Preserved and on display, at the Bo'ness and Kinneil Railway in Scotland.
- DH No' 578 - Preserved and operates as a shunter on the West Somerset Railway.
- DH No' 579 - Preserved and operates as a shunter on the West Somerset Railway.
- No' 594 "Big Momma" - Preserved and stored out of use, at the Battlefield Line Railway in Leicestershire.
- No' 615 - Preserved and currently at the Aln Valley Railway, in Northumberland.
- No' 421697 - Preserved and currently awaiting cosmetic restoration at the Scottish Industrial Railway Centre.

=== Narrow Gauge ===
'Steam Locomotives'

- No' 2 LM44 - Preserved and running on the Stradbally Woodland Railway in Ireland.
- No' 3 Darent - Preserved and running on the Kempton Steam Railway in Hounslow, West End of London.
- No' 3 Shane - Preserved and running on the Giant's Causeway and Bushmills Railway in Ireland.
- No' 4 Doll - Preserved and running on the Leighton Buzzard Light Railway in Bedfordshire.
- No' 6 Douglas - Preserved and running on the Talyllyn Railway in Wales.
- No' 8 Dougal - Preserved and running on the Welshpool and Llanfair Light Railway in Mid-Wales.
- No' 9 Jack - Preserved and running somewhere in Reading, Berkshire.
- Cegin - Preserved and undergoing restoration at the Statfold Barn Railway in Staffordshire.
- Glyder - Preserved and running at the Beamish Museum.
- Gertrude - Preserved and under overhaul on the Leighton Buzzard Light Railway in Bedfordshire.
- No' 1181 - Preserved and under restoration at the Silver Stream Railway in the Hutt Valley, New Zealand.
- No' 1222 - Converted to diesel power by A & G Price for Westfield Freezing Company. Preserved at Ngongotaha, near Rotorua.
- No' 1270 - Preserved and undergoing restoration at MOTAT's Western Springs Railway in Auckland, New Zealand.
- No' 1335 Gear Meat "No' 3" - Preserved and awaiting restoration at the Silver Stream Railway in the Hutt Valley, New Zealand.
- No' 1402 "Jura" - Preserved and undergoing restoration at the Ocean Beach Railway in Dunedin, New Zealand.
- No' 1749 PWD "531" - Preserved and running on the Silver Stream Railway in the Hutt Valley, New Zealand.
- No' 1894 - In outside storage with the Canterbury Railway Society at Ferrymead Heritage Park in Christchurch, New Zealand.
- No' 1995 "Caledonia" - Preserved and running at Hollycombe Steam Collection in Hampshire, England

'Narrow Gauge Diesel Locomotives'

- AB554/1970 - Preserved at the Welsh Highland Heritage Railway in Porthmadog.
- AB555/1970 - Preserved at the Welsh Highland Heritage Railway in Porthmadog.
- AB556/1970 - Preserved and awaiting restoration at the Apedale Valley Light Railway in Staffordshire.
- AB557/1970 - Preserved at the Almond Valley Light Railway in West Lothian.
- AB560/1971 - Preserved
- AB561/1971 - Preserved Ayrshire Railway Preservation Group.

== Gallery ==
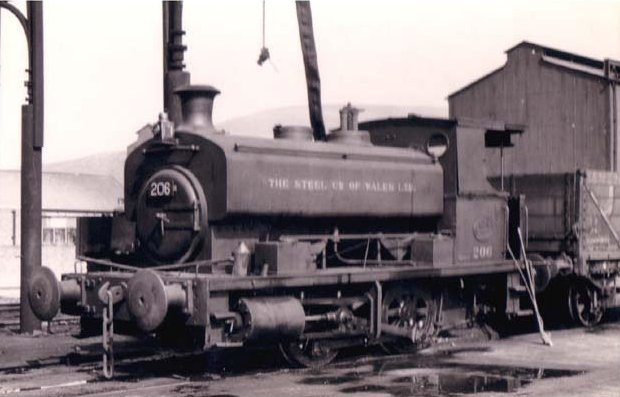
No.2016 Steel Company of Wales

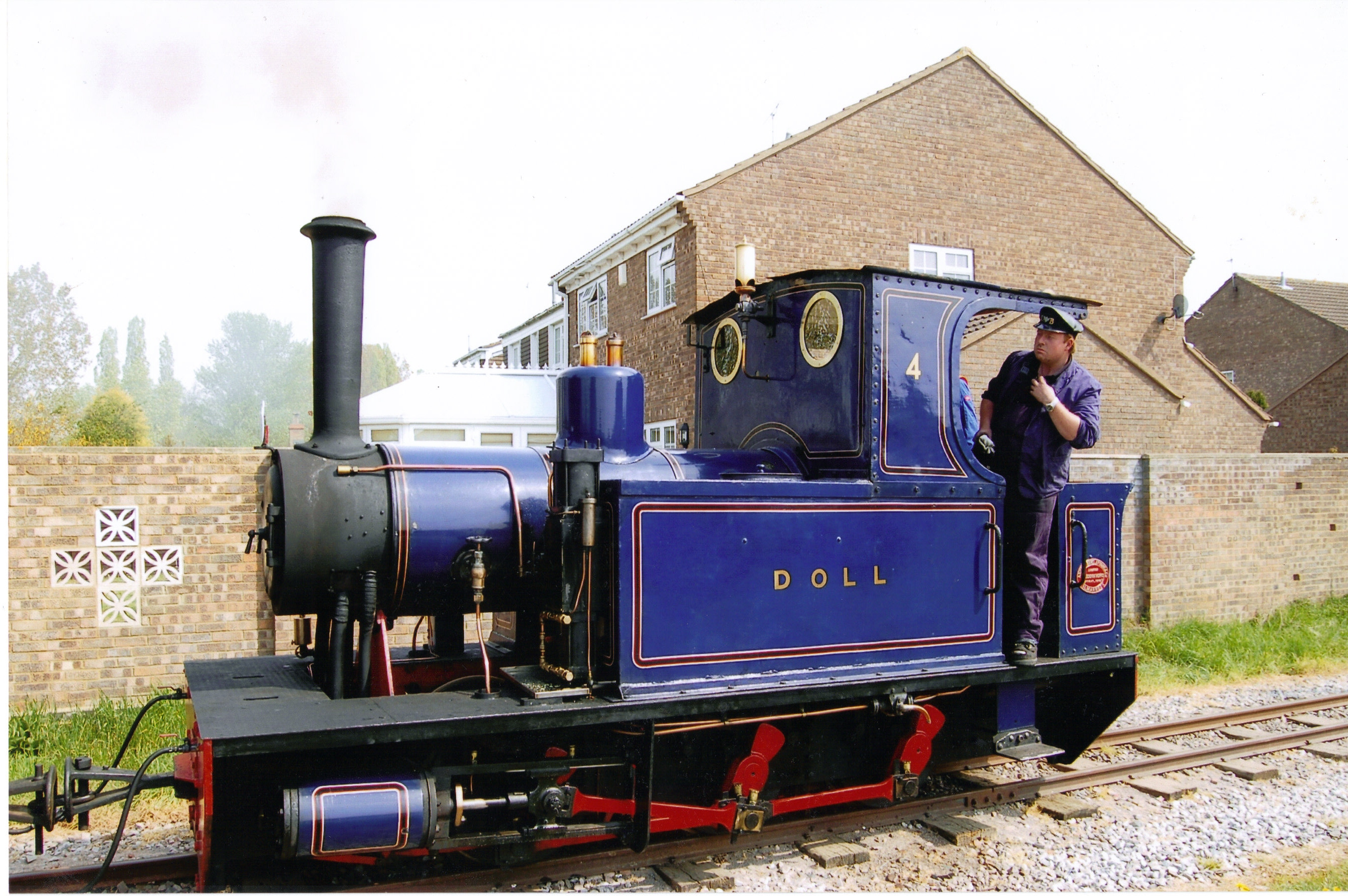
"Doll" built 1919 at the Leighton buzzard narrow gauge railway

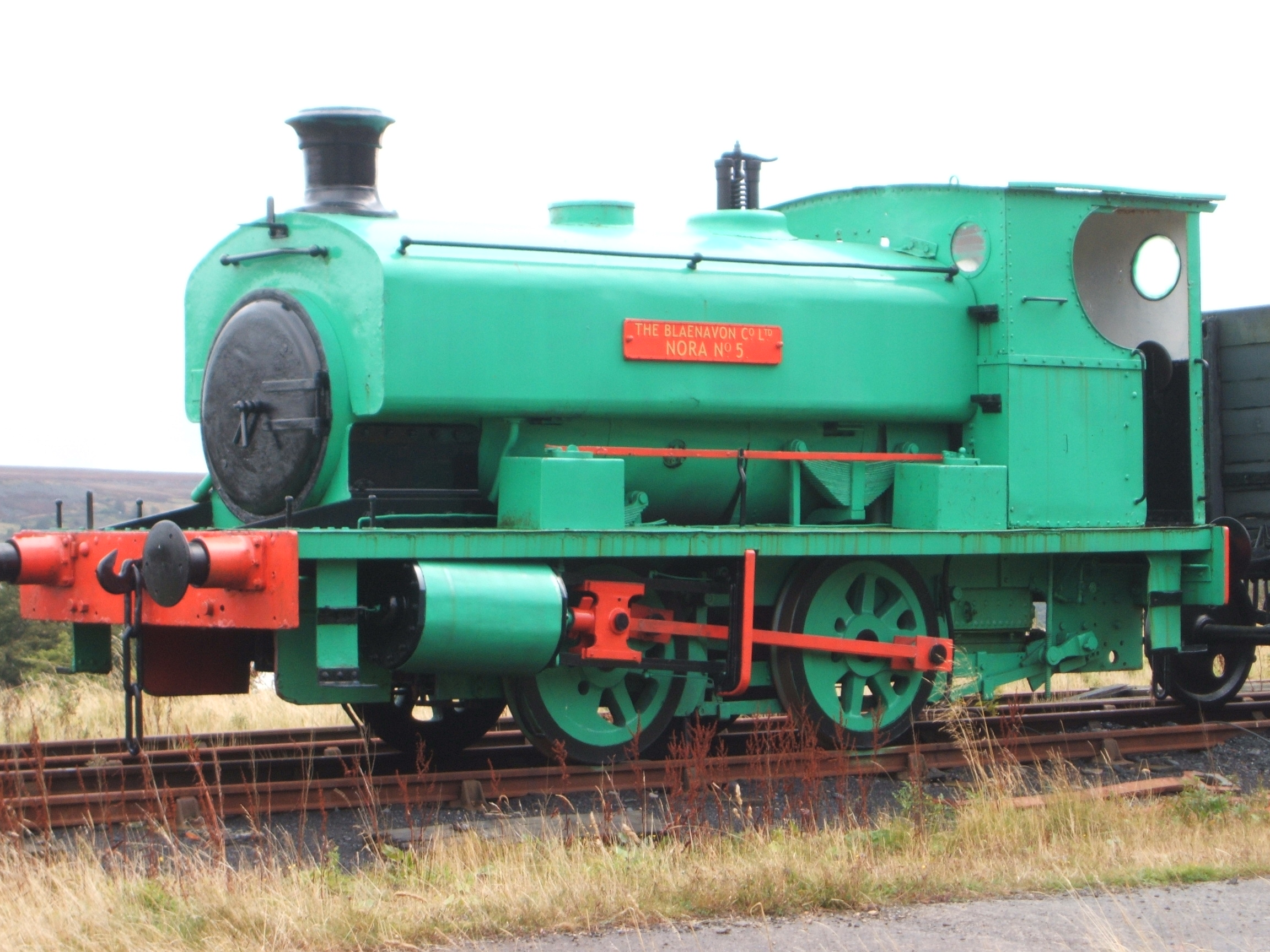
"Nora No.5" built 1912 at the Big Pit, Wales

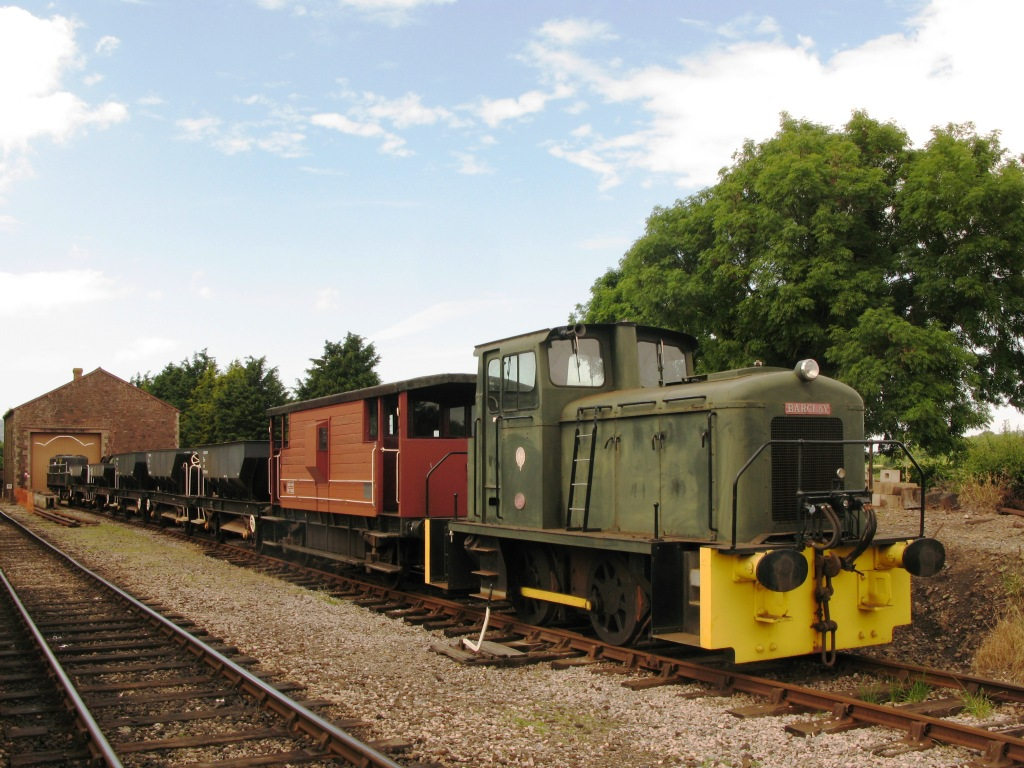
Ex-military Barclay diesel locomotive at the West Somerset Railway

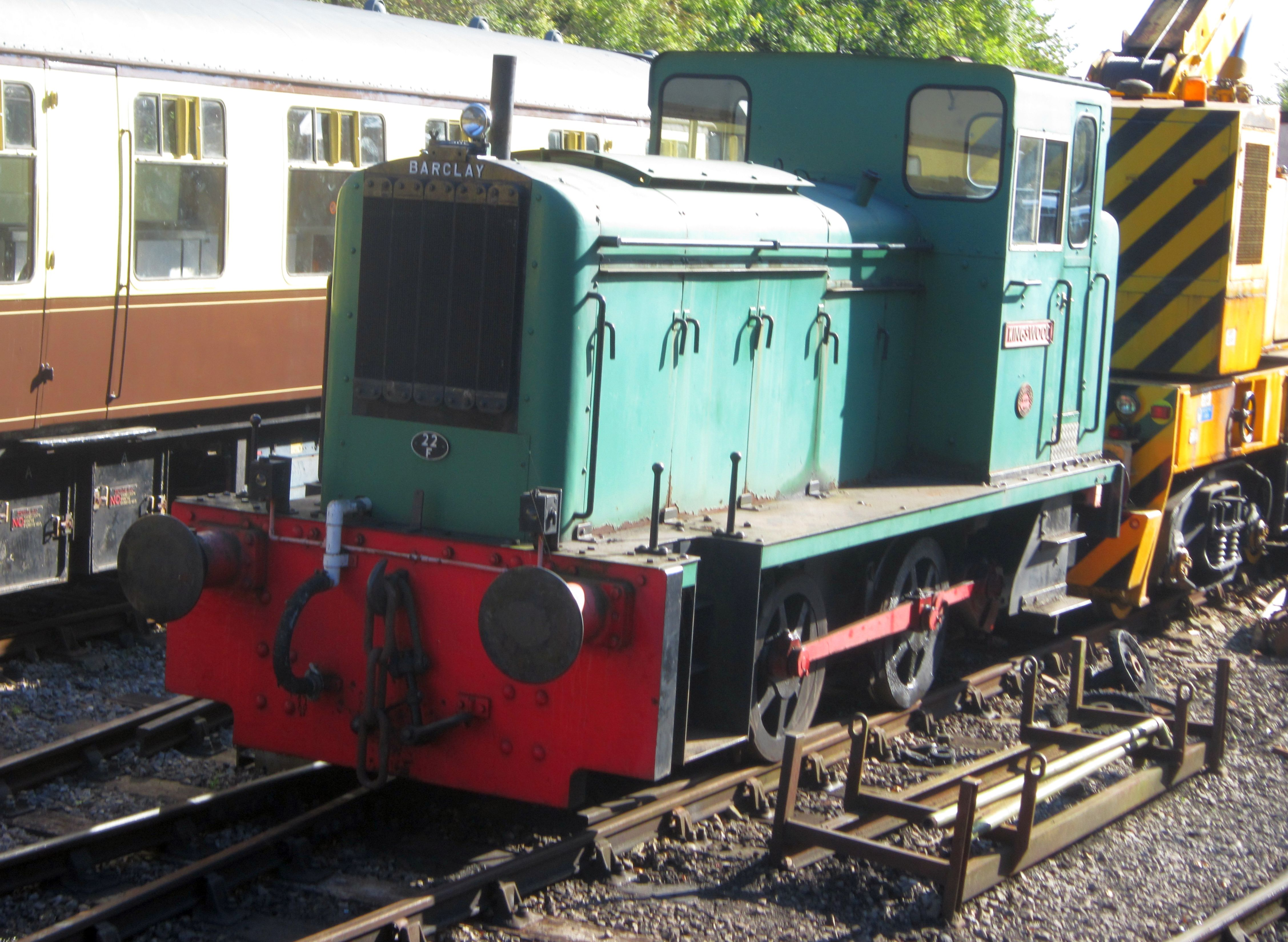
No.446 "Kingswood" at Bitton railway station

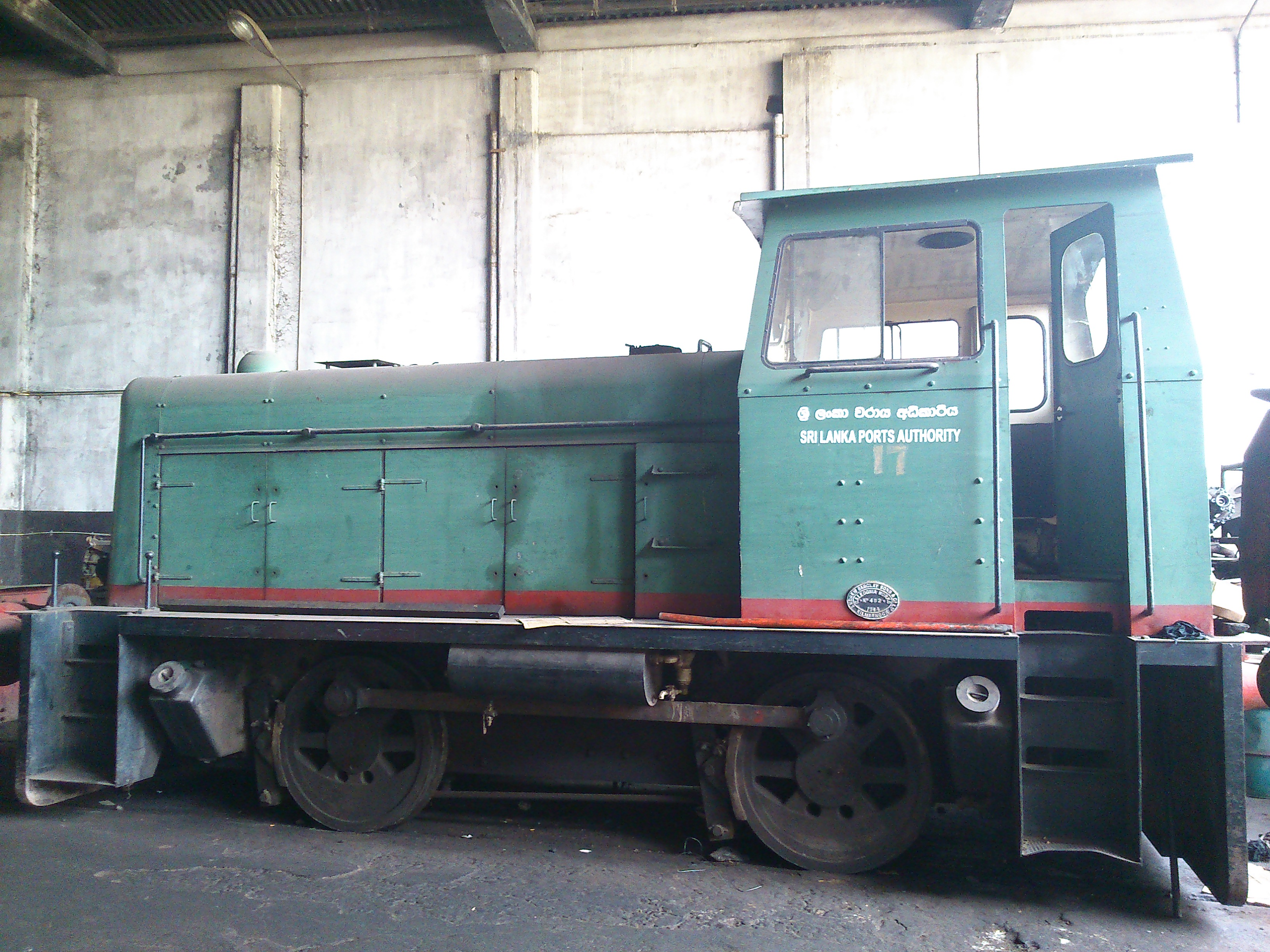
Sri Lanka Port Authority - Engine No17.

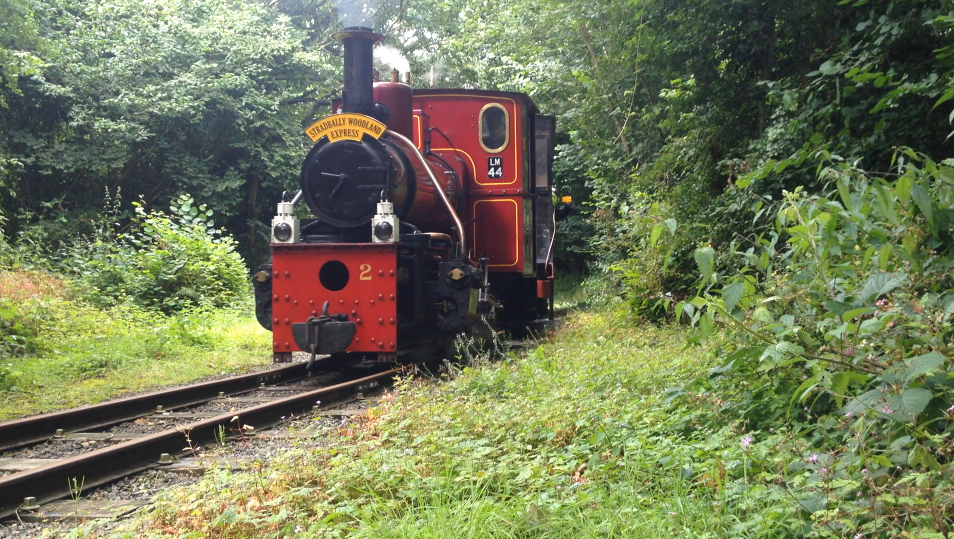
1949 Bord na Móna locomotive at the Stradbally Woodland Railway

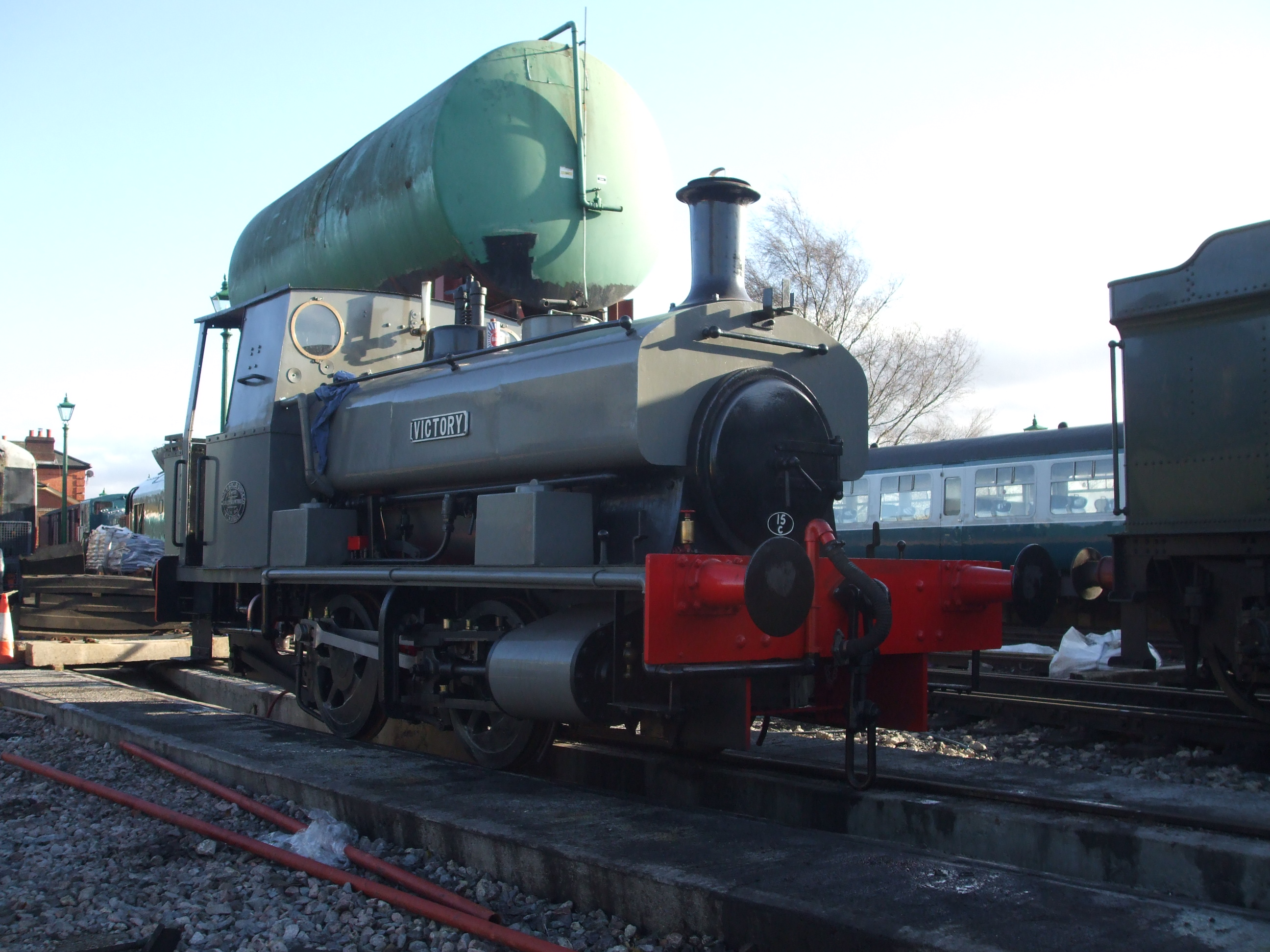
"Victory" built 1945 at Whitwell & Reepham railway station

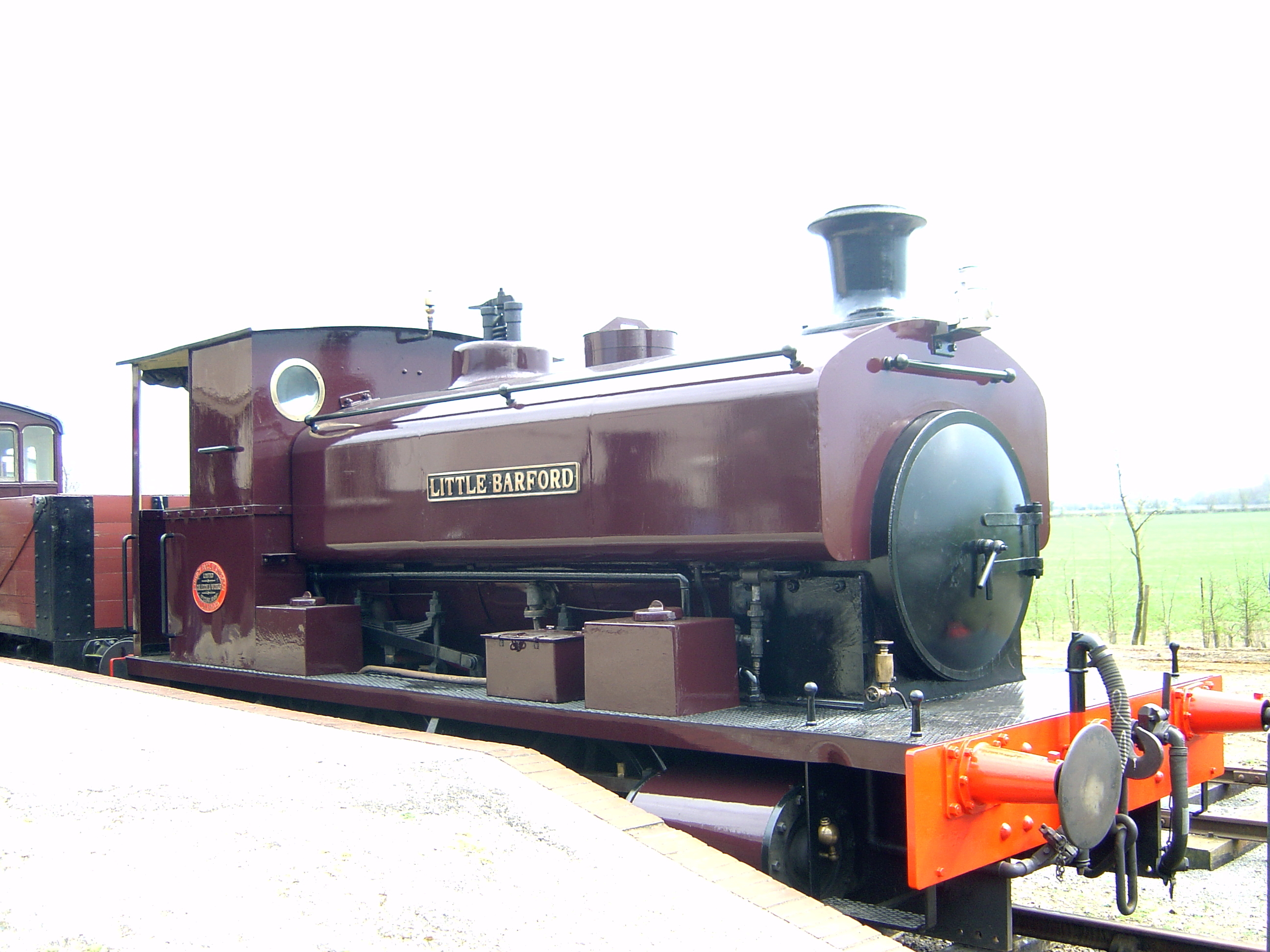
"Little Barford" built 1939 at the Mid-Suffolk Light Railway

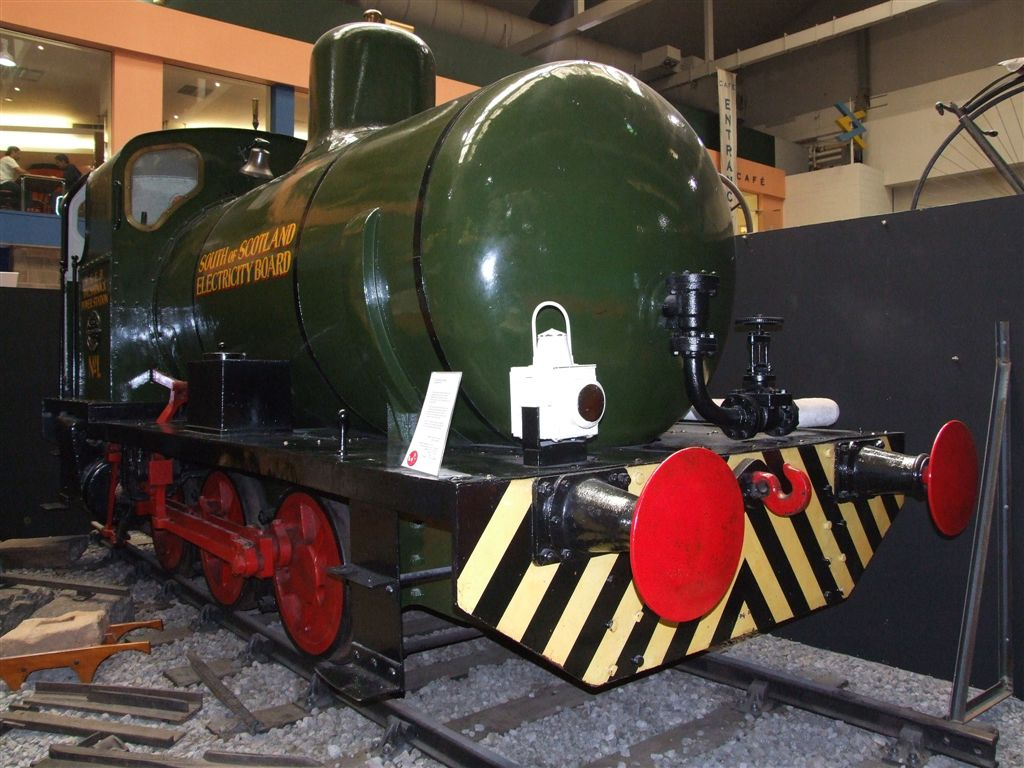
Fireless locomotive "South of Scotland Electricity Board, No.1"

== See also ==
- Grant, Ritchie and Company - In 1876, there was a disastrous fire at Andrew Barclay's Caledonia works in Kilmarnock. At this point, two employees Thomas Grant and William Ritchie, set up Grant, Ritchie and Company at Townholme Engine Works, Kilmarnock to manufacture steam locomotives.
