= Grant, Ritchie and Company =

Scottish engineering firm

- Industry: Engineering
- Founded: 1876
- Headquarters: Kilmarnock, Scotland
- Products: Steam locomotives, stationary engines

Grant, Ritchie and Company was a Scottish engineering firm based in Kilmarnock, Scotland. The company's products included steam engines and steam locomotives.

== History ==
In 1876, there was a disastrous fire at Andrew Barclay's Caledonia works in Kilmarnock. At this point, two employees of Andrew Barclay, Thomas Grant and William Ritchie, set up Grant, Ritchie and Company at Townholme Engine Works, Kilmarnock to manufacture steam locomotives. They took over an existing business called Grant Brothers but it is not known whether there was a family connection to Thomas Grant.

Between 1879 and 1920, 45 steam locomotives were built, all tank locomotives, mostly four-wheeled, and mostly standard gauge. Over half of them were of the 0-4-0ST wheel arrangement, there were also some of the 0-6-0ST, 0-4-2ST, 0-4-0CT and 0-4-0T wheel arrangements. Customers were mainly Scottish industrial concerns, such as collieries, iron and steel works. A few were sold to customers in England or Wales.

Grant, Ritchie also built colliery winding engines and one of these is preserved at the National Mining Museum; a 2400 hp engine built for the Victoria Colliery in the 1890s. A Grant, Ritchie locomotive is preserved at the Ribble Steam Railway, currently on loan at York until April 2017.
