= Stradbally Woodland Railway =

Heritage railway in Ireland

Coordinates: 53.017148°N 7.154136°W

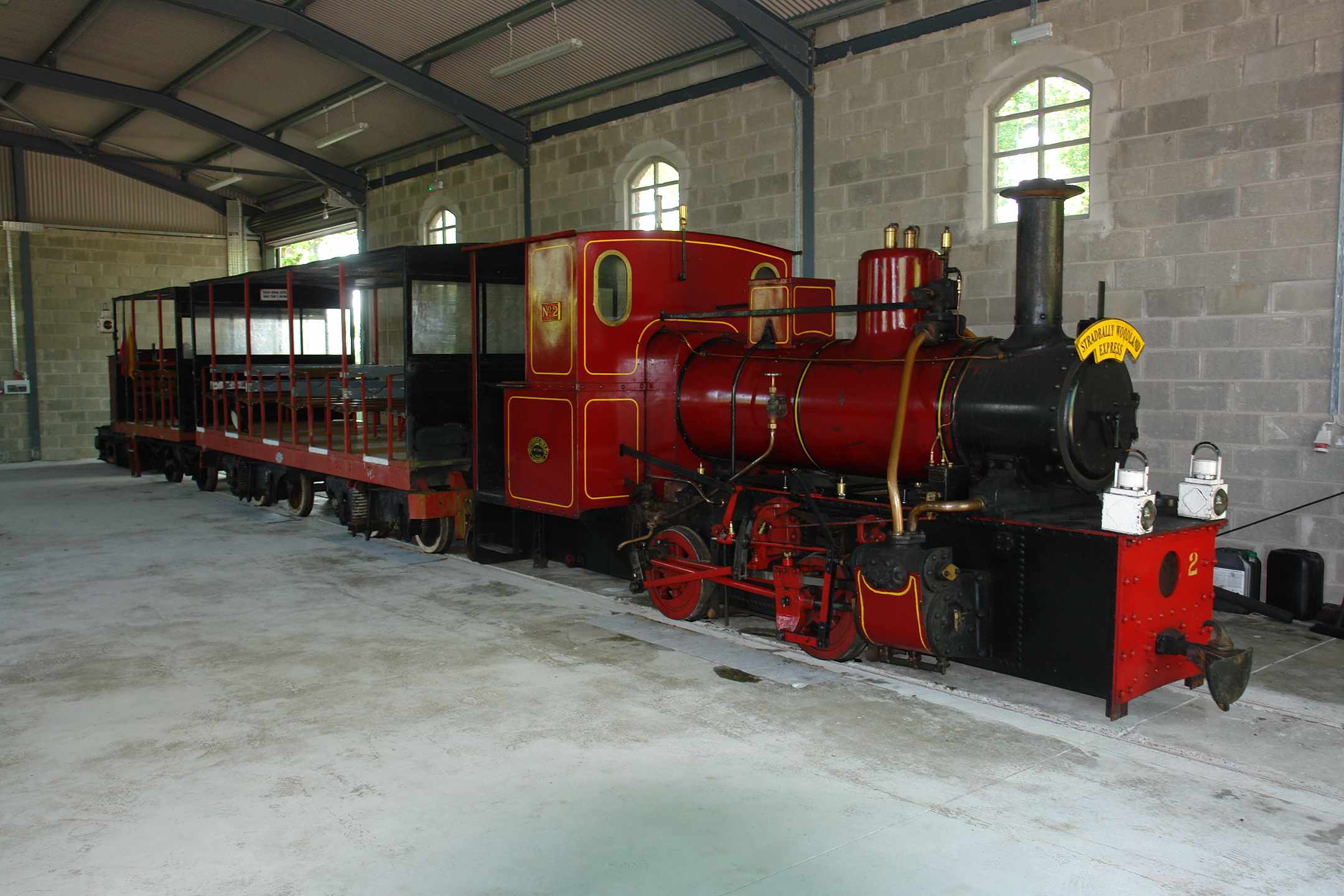
Andrew Barclay steam locomotive No.2 LM44 in the new locomotive shed

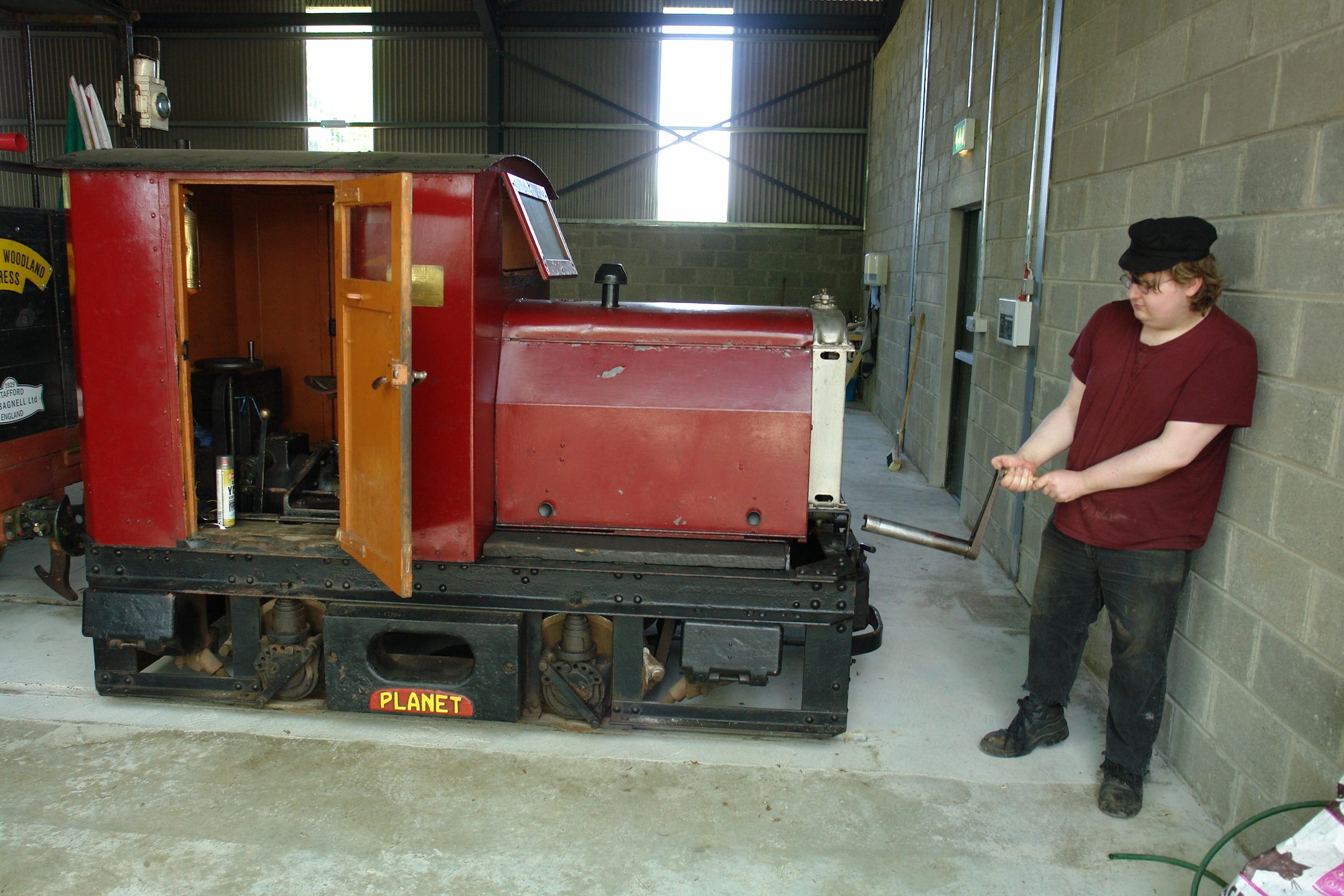
Hibberd (Planet) diesel locomotive named 'Nippy' is started by a crank

The Stradbally Woodland Railway is a 1 km (0.62 mi) long single-track 3 ft (914 mm) narrow-gauge railway line at Stradbally Hall in Stradbally, County Laois in Ireland. The railway is operated by the Irish Steam Preservation Society.

== Location ==
The Stradbally Woodland Railway is located in the fenced-off grounds of Stradbally Hall near Stradbally fire station. The line is open to the public on bank holiday weekend Sundays and Mondays from March to August and on selected other spring and summer dates.

== History ==
This narrow gauge railway is the oldest established heritage railway in Ireland. It is operated and managed by the Irish Steam Preservation Society. It was constructed in stages between 1969 and 1982 entirely by voluntary labour, many of the volunteers being full-time permanent-way workers from Córas Iompair Éireann, now Iarnród Éireann.

The Stradbally Woodland Railway was the first volunteer-run heritage railway in Ireland, having been established in 1969 and running regular steam services every Bank Holiday weekend and selected other running days ever since. The railway operates from a station through the woods, returning via a balloon loop. This line is home to former Bord na Móna steam locomotive No. 2 (later No. LM44) "Roisín" which had been built by Andrew Barclay Sons & Co. (2264 of 1949).

== Irish Steam Preservation Society ==
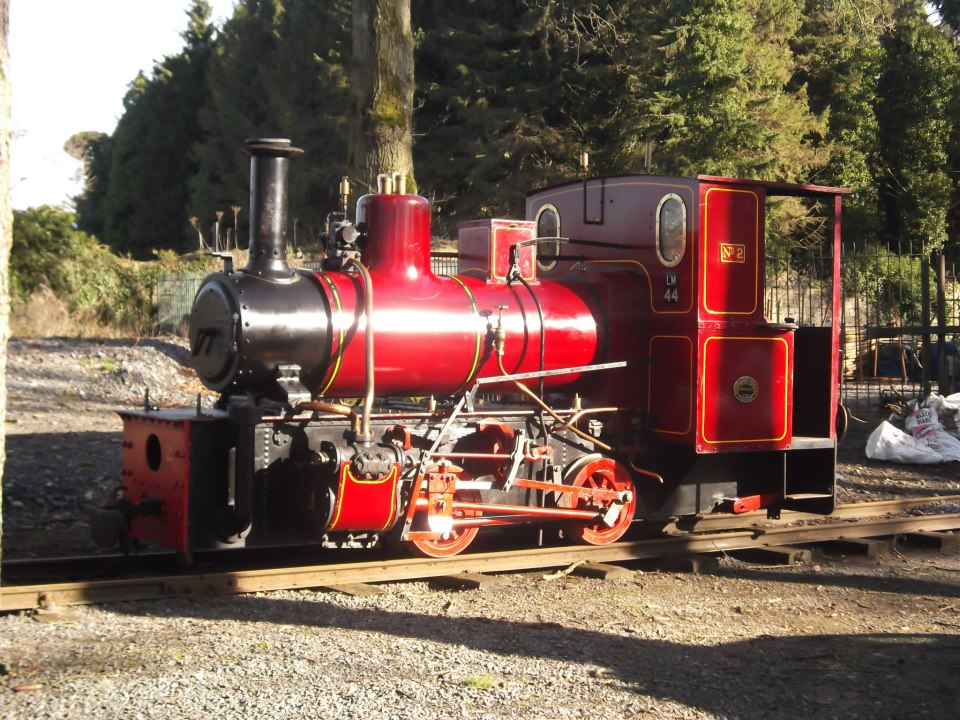
BNM No 2/LM44, currently in service on the Stradbally Woodland Railway

The Irish Steam Preservation Society is a voluntary organisation based in Stradbally, County Laois whose aim is to preserve and maintain machinery connected to Ireland's industrial and social heritage. The society is responsible for the Irish National Steam Rally. It also curates the Stradbally Steam Museum and runs the Stradbally Woodland Railway.

The society was formed by a group of Laois based enthusiasts who set out to preserve for the good of the country, a part of our national agricultural heritage, the steam traction engine and its many forms after a meeting of half a dozen members at Harold Condell’s farm in Whitefields Co. Laois in 1964. They visited the Lowton Park rally in Lancashire England to see how a rally was run in the summer of 1965. A small gathering of engines was held at the market house in Stradbally on St Stephen's day 1965 and thus with this being regarded as a success it was decided upon by the newly formed society to hold a larger rally in the grounds of Stradbally hall on the August Bank holiday weekend the following year.

=== National Steam Rally ===
The National Steam Rally began as a simple arena with engines taking part in various competitions such as a slow race, lining up to the threshing mill competitions and winching displays. Other attractions at the rally soon came about, including the addition of the steam railway in 1967 of a simple track laid out and a locomotive donated by the Guinness Brewery was run with its passenger carriage in tow. In 1969, tracks were laid to run the preserved Bórd na Móna locomotive No.2. With this addition the National Steam Rally at Stradbally remains as the only rally in Ireland to have a steam railway.

The National Steam Rally has grown and for its 50th year gathered the most steam engines ever on the island of Ireland for that anniversary year. Other heritage-focused groups, such as the Celtic steamers, have used the National rally as a place to end their "road runs" which they use to raise money for various charities.

=== Museum ===
In June 1968, the "Steam Museum" was opened in Stradbally by P.J Lalor, parliamentary secretary to the Minister of Transport and Power. It has since grown and now has a number of exhibits and engines for the public to see. It is open by arrangement with the society's secretary.

== Locomotives ==
Locomotive	Builder	Year	Works Number	Photo	Propulsion	Status	Former Owner	Former Location
No.2/LM44 'Róisín'	Andrew Barclay	1949	2264		Steam	Operational	Bord na Mona	Clonsast, County Offaly
15	William Spence, Dublin	1895			Steam	Static Exhibit	Guinness	St James' Gate, Dublin
4/Rusty	Ruston & Hornsby	1952	326052		Lister HR6	Operational	Electricity Supply Board	Portarlington, County Laois
Nippy	FC Hibberd (Planet)	1936	2014		National Engine Co	Operational	Mines & Safety Research	Buxton, England
(4)	Ruston & Hornsby	1950	300518		Lister HR6	Awaiting Restoration	Electricity Supply Board	Allenwood, County Kildare
LM167	Ruston & Hornsby	1956	402978		Gardner 4LW	Stored, serviceable	Bord na Mona	Coolnamona, County Laois
LM317	Simplex Mechanical Handling	1980	60SL742		Lister HR4	Stored, serviceable	Bord na Mona	Coolnamona, County Laois

== See also ==
- List of heritage railways in the Republic of Ireland
- List of steam fairs
- Railway Preservation Society of Ireland
