= Stradbally Hall =

Large house in County Laois, Ireland

Coordinates: 53.01061°N 7.1554°W

Stradbally is a large house in Stradbally, County Laois, Ireland. It is owned by the Cosby family and is positioned in the heart of Stradbally, around ten minutes from Portlaoise on the N80. The estate has hosted the Electric Picnic boutique arts and music festival since it began in 2004, hosts other events such as the National Steam Rally, and was the venue for an Irish Scout Jamboree in July/August 2018. The Stradbally Woodland Railway operates a short narrow gauge track on the grounds.

== History ==
=== Early history ===
During the plantations of Laois and Offaly, Queen Elizabeth I took possession of the Franciscan religious house in Stradbally, which she then gave to Francis Cosby as a reward for his role in the Tudor conquest. The family rebuilt large parts of the estate and landscaped it to their tastes and desires, including the addition of a hermitage. Encountering financial difficulties, the family left Ireland for the city of Bristol, England in the early eighteenth century. An account written at the time described how the family returned rather quickly to Stradbally "not all of us liking England."

Stradbally Hall has been rebuilt several times, most recently in 1860 by Charles Lanyon, who rebuilt it in an Italianate style complete with a ballroom.

=== Early 20th century ===
Enid Elizabeth Cosby lived in the house for seventy years until her death at the age of ninety-three in 2008. In 1934 at the age of nineteen, she married into the Cosby family when she took Maj Errold Ashworth Sidney Cosby as her husband. At her death, The Irish Times remembered her as "a strikingly beautiful figure" whilst attending the Laois Hunt Ball at the Hall dressed in emeralds owned by the family. She was also known for organising parties during the Christmas season and bred and also judged Welsh ponies.

During World War II, Maj Errold Ashworth Sidney Cosby rejoined his regiment and, being fluent in the Russian language, performed the role of interpreter in the Persian Gulf. Mrs Cosby remained at Stradbally Hall to tend to the couple's children for the duration of the war. She opened a girls school in the house during the 1950s, allowing the girls to board and to tend to their ponies on the estate. Three governesses were responsible for their education.

=== Late 20th century ===
The British Prime Minister Edward Heath was invited to address a conference of young members of his country's Conservative Party at Stradbally Hall on one occasion. This was later cancelled at short notice.

In the latter decades of the twentieth century, a financial struggle ensued over the maintenance of Stradbally Hall. Buckets were positioned under leaks to prevent rainwater damaging the main reception rooms. Paintings and emeralds were sold off to raise much needed funds.

Maj Errod Ashworth Sidney Cosby died in 1984 and passed the estate on to his eldest son, Adrian. Adrian farmed the estate before passing it on to his son, Thomas. Thomas initiated the annual Electric Picnic music festival which began in 2004.
