= National Mining Museum Scotland =

Mining museum in Dalkeith, Scotland

Coordinates: 55.861°N 3.066°W

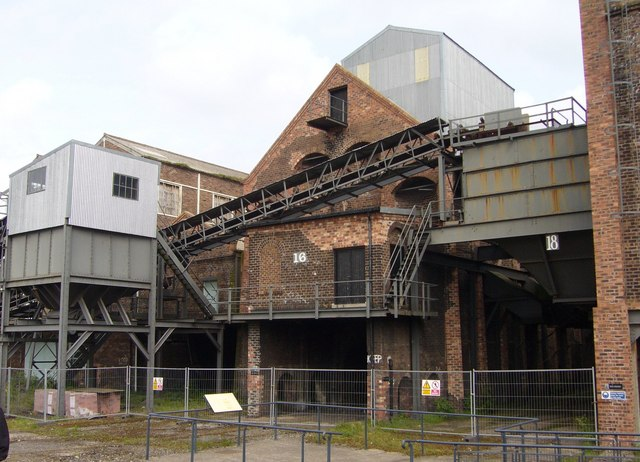
Scottish Mining Museum, Newtongrange

The National Mining Museum Scotland was created in 1984, to preserve the physical surface remains of Lady Victoria Colliery at Newtongrange, Midlothian, Scotland. The colliery, sunk by the Lothian Coal Company in 1890, came into production in 1894. It was nationalised in 1947 with the formation of the National Coal Board, and had closed in 1981.

== Buildings ==
The buildings were recognised as being of outstanding interest as they formed an almost complete survival of a major Victorian colliery, with later additions. Some demolition, such as the 1950s canteen and medical centre, has occurred but the vast bulk of the structures stand. The winding engine is by Grant, Ritchie and Company and the colliery headstocks were built by Arrols of Glasgow. From 1998 onwards several of the main structures were stabilised and new visitor facilities opened.

== Collections ==
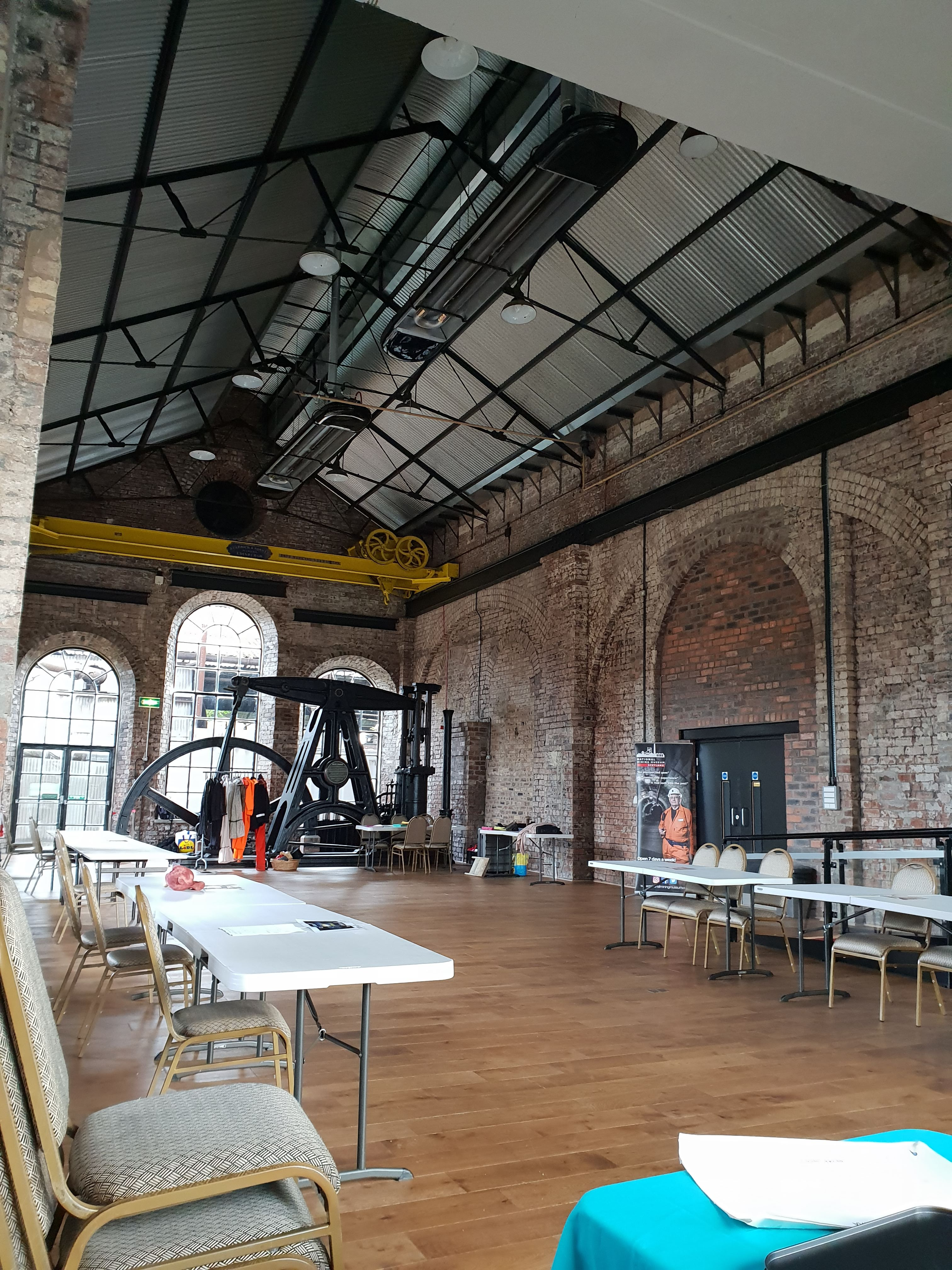
Interior of the National Mining Museum machine hall, set up for an event as part of the Midlothian Science Festival.

The Museum developed collections, such as a library, and exhibitions that were housed in a visitor centre which has previously formed part of the colliery offices. The Prestongrange beam engine, a Cornish engine, at Prestonpans, East Lothian, also for a time formed part of the Museum until responsibility for it passed to East Lothian Council.

== Recognition ==
The Colliery is Listed Category 'A' by Historic Scotland. In 2008, to mark the 100th anniversary of the Royal Commission on the Ancient and Historical Monuments of Scotland, a drawing of Lady Victoria Colliery won an online vote as Scotland's Most Treasured place. A poem commemorating the colliery was also written.

The museum has been described as 'a national treasure where the story of coal is kept alive for present and future generations' and the entire collection is recognised as a Nationally Significant Collection by Museums Galleries Scotland on behalf of the Scottish Government.
