= List of Hunslet narrow-gauge locomotive designs =

Below are the details of the types of narrow-gauge steam locomotives designed and built by the Hunslet Engine Company.

Individual examples of some of these types have been preserved on heritage railways.

Type name	Wheel arrangement	Gauges	Weight	Notes
Bedert	0-6-4ST	1 ft 11 1/2 in (597 mm)	17 tons (17.3 t)	Beddgelert supplied to the North Wales Narrow Gauge Railways
Murta	4-4-0	3 ft (914 mm)	31 tons 10 cwt (32.0 t)	
Champ	0-4-0ST	3 ft (914 mm)	6 tons 7 cwt (6.5 t)	
Helva	0-4-0ST	2 ft 1 1/4 in (641.3 mm)	6 tons 12 cwt (6.7 t)	Similar design to the Quarry Hunslet supplied to several north Wales slate quarries
Santal	0-4-0ST	3 ft 6 in (1,067 mm)	8 tons 10 cwt (8.6 t)	
Abeja	0-6-0T	1,000 mm (3 ft 3 3/8 in)	12 tons 10 cwt (12.7 t)	
Rafla	0-6-0T	1,000 mm (3 ft 3 3/8 in)	41 tons 19 cwt (42.6 t)	
Drybo	0-4-2T	3 ft 6 in (1,067 mm)	9 tons 17 cwt (10.0 t)	
Carbo	0-6-2T	2 ft 6 in (762 mm)	17 tons 13 cwt (17.9 t)	
Honkon	0-6-0ST	1,000 mm (3 ft 3 3/8 in)	20 tons 16 cwt (21.1 t)	
Nalon	0-6-0T	1,000 mm (3 ft 3 3/8 in)	26 tons 11 cwt (27.0 t)	
Bowes	0-6-0T	2 ft 4 in (711 mm)	10 tons 5 cwt (10.4 t)	
Larti	0-3-0T	Lartigue monorail	10 tons (10.2 t)	Locomotives supplied to the Listowel and Ballybunion Railway
Seral	0-6-0T	2 ft 6 in (762 mm)	11 tons 11 cwt (11.7 t)	
Basat	0-4-2T	2 ft 6 in (762 mm)	14 tons 9 cwt (14.7 t)	
Marj	0-4-0ST	2 ft 6 in (762 mm)	12 tons 5 cwt (12.4 t)	
Masha	0-6-2T	1 ft 11 1/2 in (597 mm)	18 tons 10 cwt (18.8 t)	Locomotive Leeds No. 1 supplied to the Masham Brewery Railway
Natgov	4-6-2T	2 ft (610 mm)	25 tons 5 cwt (25.7 t)	Large side tank class supplied to the Natal Government Railways
Eva	0-4-2T	2 ft (610 mm)	15 tons (15.2 t)	Supplied to the Howrah-Amta Light Railway
Jumna	2-6-2T	2 ft 6 in (762 mm)	25 tons 19 cwt (26.4 t)	
Diana	2-8-0	2 ft 6 in (762 mm)	74 tons 2 cwt (75.3 t)	
Cenchu	0-6-0ST	1,000 mm (3 ft 3 3/8 in)	18 tons 14 cwt (19.0 t)	
Grobi	0-6-0ST	2 ft (610 mm)	9 tons 17 cwt (10.0 t)	Supplied to the Groby Granite Quarry railway
Beng	0-4-0T	2 ft 6 in (762 mm)	4 tons 14 cwt (4.8 t)	
Micro	0-4-0T	1 ft 11 1/2 in (597 mm)	8 tons 14 cwt (8.8 t)	
Arras	0-6-0T	2 ft 6 in (762 mm)	9 tons 18 cwt (10.1 t)	
Fortu	0-4-0T	2 ft 6 in (762 mm)	9 tons 15 cwt (9.9 t)	
Kystim	0-4-0ST	3 ft (914 mm)	8 tons 19 cwt (9.1 t)	
Johor	0-6-0	2 ft 6 in (762 mm)	13 tons 11 cwt (13.8 t)	
Boliv	0-6-4T	2 ft (610 mm)	26 tons 7 cwt (26.8 t)	
Briho	0-6-0T	3 ft (914 mm)	20 tons 19 cwt (21.3 t)	
Sanmar	2-6-0	3 ft (914 mm)	54 tons 11 cwt (55.4 t)	
Bodry	0-4-2T	2 ft (610 mm)	10 tons 16 cwt (11.0 t)	
Sanlu	0-4-2ST	2 ft 6 in (762 mm)	14 tons 19 cwt (15.2 t)	
Waril	0-4-0WT	18 in (457 mm)	5 tons 19 cwt (6.0 t)	
Shada	2-6-4T	2 ft 6 in (762 mm)	31 tons 9 cwt (32.0 t)	
Waroff	4-6-0T	1 ft 11 1/2 in (597 mm)	14 tons 1 cwt (14.3 t)	Supplied to the War Department Light Railways
Hamil	0-4-0ST	3 ft (914 mm)	12 tons 8 cwt (12.6 t)	
Dinor	0-4-0ST	1 ft 10 3/4 in (578 mm)	6 tons 14 cwt (6.8 t)	Quarry Hunslet class supplied to Dinorwic slate quarry and many other quarries in the United Kingdom
Tymon	4-6-0T	3 ft (914 mm)	39 tons 10 cwt (40.1 t)	
Stocs	4-6-0T	3 ft (914 mm)	13 tons 1 cwt (13.3 t)	
Miro	2-8-0	2 ft 6 in (762 mm)	46 tons 16 cwt (47.1 t)	
Sntma	4-4-0T	3 ft (914 mm)	17 tons 6 cwt (17.6 t)	
Benag	2-6-2T	2 ft 6 in (762 mm)	22 tons 12½ cwt (23.0 t)	
Kbeng	0-6-4T	2 ft 6 in (762 mm)	19 tons 15 cwt (20.1 t)	
Afzeb	0-6-0T	2 ft (610 mm)	11 tons 6 cwt (11.5 t)	
Sleon	2-6-2T	2 ft 6 in (762 mm)	21 tons 5 cwt (21.6 t)	Supplied to the Sierra Leone Government Railway. One example survives on the Welshpool and Llanfair Light Railway
Nalta	0-6-2T	2 ft (610 mm)	20 tons 11 cwt (20.9 t)	
Dolph	2-8-4T	2 ft 6 in (762 mm)	37 tons 8 cwt (38.0 t)	5 built for Indian railways, 2ft gauge new build being built for WHR.
Nepal	0-6-2T	2 ft 6 in (762 mm)	24 tons 5 cwt (24.6 t)	
Dawin	0-4-2ST	2 ft (610 mm)	10 tons 2 cwt (10.3 t)	Kerr Stuart design
Matry	0-6-2T	1,000 mm (3 ft 3 3/8 in)	16 tons 15 cwt (17.0 t)	
Afour	0-4-0+0-4-0T	2 ft (610 mm)	25 tons 1 cwt (25.5 t)	Avonside Engine Company design
Anhej	0-4-2T	2 ft (610 mm)	15 tons 7 cwt (15.6 t)	
Andie	0-4-2T	2 ft (610 mm)	8 tons 12 cwt (8.7 t)	
Artic	4w+4wDM	18 in (457 mm)	13 tons 5 cwt (13.5 t)	Supplied to the Royal Arsenal Railway; one example is preserved (See Note 1)
Brand	6wDM	2 ft 6 in (762 mm)	15 tons (15.2 t)	Supplied to the National Coal Board; several examples survive
Pitpo	4wDM	18 in (457 mm)	1 tons 16 cwt (1.8 t)	Supplied to the National Coal Board; several examples survive

== See also ==
- List of preserved Hunslet narrow-gauge locomotives
- List of preserved Hunslet Austerity 0-6-0ST locomotives

== Notes ==
1. Two articulated Hunslet Engine 0-4-4-0DM diesel locomotives were supplied to the Royal Arsenal, Woolwich: Albert in 1934 (scrapped in 1961) and Carnegie in 1954. Carnegie was later sold, subsequently rescued and moved to the Bicton Woodland Railway in 1966. She then moved to the Waltham Abbey Royal Gunpowder Mills and thence to the Statfold Barn Railway.
