= TDLR 7 and 8 =

Class of Irish steam locomotives

Tralee and Dingle Light Railway 7 and 8
Type and origin
- Power type: Steam
- Builder: Kerr, Stuart and Company
- Serial number: 800, 836
- Build date: 1902, 1903
Specifications
- Configuration
  - Whyte: 2-6-0T
  - UIC: 1′C n2t
- Gauge: 3 ft (914 mm)
- Leading dia.: 2 ft 0 in (0.610 m)
- Driver dia.: 3 ft 0 in (0.914 m)
- Loco weight: 31 long tons 0 cwt (69,400 lb or 31.5 t)
- Fuel type: Coal
- Fuel capacity: 1 long ton 0 cwt (2,200 lb or 1 t)
- Water cap.: 750 imp gal (3,400 L; 900 US gal)
- Firebox
  - Grate area: 7.5 sq ft (0.70 m^{2})
- Boiler pressure: 140 lbf/in^{2} (0.97 MPa)
- Heating surface
  - Firebox: 47 sq ft (4.4 m^{2})
  - Tubes: 431 sq ft (40.0 m^{2})
- Cylinders: Two, outside
- Cylinder size: 12.5 in × 20 in (318 mm × 508 mm)
Performance figures
- Tractive effort: 10,330 lbf (45.95 kN)
Career
- Operators: TDLR » Great Southern Railways » CIÉ
- Class: GSR/CIÉ 4T or KN1
- Number in class: 2
- Numbers: 7, 8 (renumbered 4 in 1908)
- Withdrawn: 1928, 1959

Tralee and Dingle Light Railway 7 and 8 were two 2-6-0T locomotives manufactured by Kerr, Stuart and Company in 1902 and 1903 for the Tralee and Dingle Light Railway.

Around the turn of the 20th century the Tralee and Dingle Railway saw an increase in its traffic. On this railway cattle were far more important than passengers so the directors began looking for extra motive power. Taking into account that the line had only light trackwork, heavier locomotives were out of the question without changes to the wheel arrangement, although extra power could be made available with changes to the cylinders or boiler tubework to increase the heating surface and so the tractive effort.

These two locomotives, built by Kerr Stuart at their California Works, Stoke-on-Trent, provided the extra motive power and retained the 2-6-0T wheel arrangement. On the amalgamation in 1925 these locomotives passed to the Great Southern Railways as their Class 4T or Class KN1.

== History ==
These two locomotives were delivered from the workshops of Kerr Stuart in 1902 and 1903. Like the Hunslet built locomotives (1 to 3, 6, and 8) these were fitted out to be suitable for tramway working with "skirts" covering the driving wheels and motion, cowcatchers, bell, headlight etc. The "skirts", normally a legal requirement for road-side tramways, were removed after only a short time to give crews easier access for lubrication of the motion etc. As photographic evidence does not show their return it must be presumed that the Board of Trade inspectors didn't get to this corner of Ireland very often.

They were delivered as Tralee & Dingle numbers 7 and 8, however No. 8 was re-numbered as No. 4 in 1908, following the scrapping in 1907 of the original, a Hunslet 0-4-2T, built in 1890 and withdrawn in 1902.

Orig. No.	Re-No.	Builders	Works No.	Date	Scrapped	Notes
7	7T	Kerr Stuart	800	1902	1928	
8*	4/4T	Kerr Stuart	836	1903	1959	to Cavan and Leitrim Railway, 1941

- Originally numbered No.8. Re-numbered No.4 in 1907 when the original No.4, an 0-4-2T (Hunslet 514-1890) was scrapped (withdrawn in 1902).

== Livery ==
T&D locomotives were painted dark green lined out with red between two cream lines and with red buffer beams. After the 1925 amalgamation the locomotives were painted in the standard GSR plain grey, the buffer beam remaining red.

== Model ==
The Kerr Stuart #4 is available as a Gauge 1 etched-brass kit from Studio Scale Models This kit includes a brass chassis, nickel silver underframe with brass and white-metal parts.

== Sources ==
- Clements, Jeremy & McMahon, Michael (2008). Locomotives of the GSR. Newtownards: Colourpoint Books. p. 226. ISBN 978-1-906578-26-8.
- http://www.tdlr.org.uk
