= Hunslet DH60C =

Type and origin
- Power type: Diesel
- Builder: Hunslet Engine Company
Specifications
- Gauge: 1,435 mm (4 ft 8 1/2 in) standard gauge
- Minimum curve: 70 m (229 ft 8 in)
- Length: 9.850 m (32 ft 3.8 in)
- Width: 2.700 m (8 ft 10.3 in)
- Height: 3.765 m (12 ft 4.2 in)
- Loco weight: 60 tonnes (59.1 long tons; 66.1 short tons)
- Engine type: Caterpillar C15
- Transmission: Hydrodynamic
- MU working: (optional) 2 locomotives
Performance figures
- Maximum speed: 20 km/h (12 mph)
- Power output: 354 kW (475 hp) @ 2100rpm
- Tractive effort: 194 kN @ μ = 0.33 (maximum)
- Values for 3 axle CAT engined version.

The Hunslet DH60C is a shunter developed by Hunslet Engine Company. It has a robust modern design and is intended for heavy shunting and short industrial trips.

== Background and design ==
In 2007 the Hunslet Engine Company announced that it was developing a new shunter type, with a family of diesel hydraulic designs (B, C or B'B' axle arrangement) up to 100 tonnes posited for future development, in 2008 manufacture of the first model - a 60tonne, 3 axle machine began. The first locomotive of type DH60C was unveiled at Chasewater Railway in July 2010.

The locomotive applied modern design principles to a shunter designed for the UK market; (Note: The design is built to the standard UK vehicle gauge - as defined by drawing 'UK L-A1-1806'.) the locomotive has swing arm/coil spring suspension, with vertical hydraulic damping, and pneumatic brakes. The transmission is via a hydrodynamic converter and cardan drive shafts to right angled gearbox drives on each axle.

Test trials of the locomotive were carried out at Daventry International Railfreight Terminal.

A four-wheeled variant is also being developed, and Hunslet intends to certify it for use across the UK's national rail network.
