= List of preserved Hunslet Austerity 0-6-0ST locomotives =

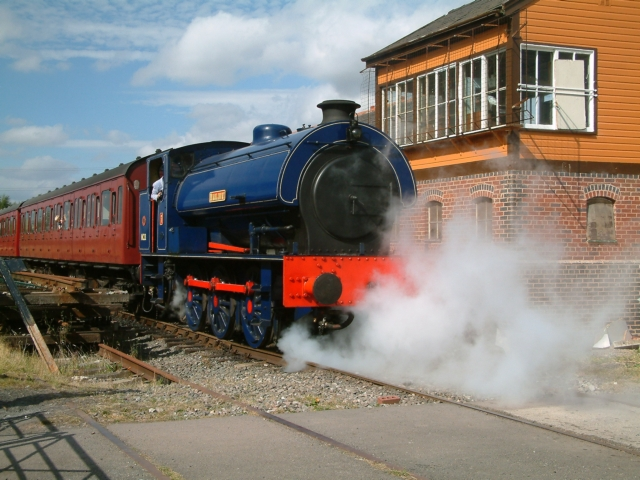
On the Chasewater Railway

This table details the steam locomotives of the Hunslet Austerity 0-6-0ST class that have been preserved on heritage railways. Of the 484 'Austerities' constructed, around 70 have survived into preservation, often referred to by enthusiasts as "Buckets".

Although the Hunslet Engine Company were responsible for the design, not all of these locomotives were built by the company. In order to meet wartime demand, Hunslet subcontracted some of the construction to Andrew Barclay Sons & Co., W. G. Bagnall, Hudswell Clarke, Robert Stephenson and Hawthorns and the Vulcan Foundry.

Several have been painted as LNER Class J94s to represent mainline rather than industrial use. Not all have survived intact; the boiler of RSH 7135 of 1944 was used on the replica Broad gauge locomotive "Iron Duke" built in 1985. One has been turned into a Thomas the Tank Engine lookalike, and another into one of Douglas, also from The Railway Series.

The Scottish Railway Preservation Society have formed an Austerity Locomotive Owners Association (A.L.O.A.) with the aim of being a central point for owners of Austerity locomotives to share information and assistance.

== List of locomotives ==
Year built	Builder	Works Number	Original User	Current Number and Name	Current Location	Status	Livery	Notes and images
1943	Hudswell Clarke	1752	War Department 75091, National Coal Board Bold Colliery 7 Robert	68067 Robert			BR black, with "cycling lion" crest, smokebox number plate and 40E shed code	Named Robert at Bold Colliery in 1978 and was part of the Rocket 150 cavalcade in 1980.
1945	Barclay	2183	War Department 71529, WD 165; EG Steels of Hamilton	Wemyss Private Railway; 15 Earl David	Nene Valley Railway	Operational	WPR lined brown	Named in 2009 at the Gloucestershire Warwickshire Railway.
1943	Hunslet	2855	War Department 75006	75006			Maroon	
1943	Hunslet	2857	War Department 75008	75008 Swiftsure			Longmoor Military Railway Prussian blue	
1943	Hunslet	2864	War Department 75015	48	Aln Valley Railway	Stored		
1943	RSH	7098	Ministry of Fuel & Power, Coalville, Leicestershire NCB (North East Area) - Backworth	49	Tanfield Railway	Operational	Lined green	
1943	Hunslet	2880	War Department 75031, WD 101	17	SRPS at Bo'ness and Kinneil Railway			Bought by NCB in 1961 and used at Polkemmet Colliery, West Lothian.
1943	Hunslet	2890; 3882 (as rebuilt)	War Department 75041; WD 107	10 Douglas	East Lancashire Railway	Rebuilt as tender loco. Returned to service in Sept 2017	NWR black	Supplied to the War Department as 75041, and used on the Longmoor Military Railway as WD 107 Foggia. Fitted with GPCS in 1962, and given works number 3882. Used by the NCB at Maesteg Colliery until 1976 Worked on the Watercress Line as Barbara. In 2000, converted to an 0-6-0 tender engine as No. 10 Douglas from Thomas the Tank Engine.
1943	RSH	7086	War Department 75050	69 Norman	Embsay and Bolton Abbey Steam Railway		NCB black	
1943	RSH	7097	War Department 75061	9	Strathspey Railway			
1943	Hunslet	2873	War Department 75024	NS 8811	Stoom Stichting Nederland, Rotterdam, Netherlands			Sold directly from WD to Laura colliery, Eygelshoven (NL) in 1945, numbered 'Laura 12' (later LV 12). Oou 1967. Then the boiler of LV 13, before 1962 known as 'Julia IV' (ex NS 8811, ex WD 75080), was placed on the frame of LV 12 (ex WD 75024). The colliery numbered its locomotives after their boilers and not after the framenumbers (as practiced by WD and most railway companies). So this means the loco became LV 13 after its boiler. Went out of service after colliery closed in 1974. Was still under steam in 1975 when cleaning up the remains of the colliery. Giving this locomotive the status of last operational steam engine in The Netherlands. Stored in the former locomotive shed until discovery in 1981. Operates today with a new boiler (RAW Görlitz 20/1995) on the LV 12 frame (WD 75024). NS numbering follows the frame. So this never was a NS engine. The NS-number 8811 is fictional but fun.
1944	W.G.Bagnall	2749	War Department 75161	6	Caledonian Railway (Brechin)			
1944	W.G.Bagnall	2746	War Department 75158	The Duke	Ecclesbourne Valley Railway	Operational	Maroon	Returned to service December 2023.
1944	W.G.Bagnall	2758	War Department 75170		Cefn Coed Colliery Museum, Crynant	Static display		NCB
1944	Hudswell Clarke	1776	War Department 71499, NCB	Harry	Horwich, Lancashire			Under overhaul at Bryn Engineering, Wigan.
1944	Hunslet	3155	War Department 75105	Walkden	Ribble Steam Railway	Stored awaiting overhaul	WD green	Sold on to Nederlandse Spoorwegen (No. 8815) after the war. Sold to Laura colliery, Eygelshoven (NL) in 1953 as Laura 16, renumbered as LV 16 in 1962. Still in steam in 1970 when clearing up remains of the colliery. Boiler exam expired in 1970, received the boiler from LV 15 (Hudswell C. 1739/1943). Sold to SSTT in 1975. Sold to P.E. Waters Associates Railway Engineers in 1988.
1944	Hunslet	3163	War Department 75113, WD 132	WD 132 Sapper	Kent and East Sussex Railway	Operational	WD green	Previously on the South Devon Railway. Sold in 2009 to unnamed private buyer. Refurbished by the Flour Mill 2010-2011.
1944	Hunslet	3165	War Department 75115	NS 8826	Zuid-Limburgse Stoomtrein Maatschappij, Limburg, Netherlands	Stored awaiting overhaul		Sold on to Nederlandse Spoorwegen (No. 8826) after the war. Sold to Julia colliery, Eygelshoven (NL) in 1953 as 'Julia V', renumbered as LV 14 in 1962. Went out of service after boiler ticket expired in 1973
1944	Hunslet	3168	War Department 75118, WD 134	Wheldale	Embsay and Bolton Abbey Steam Railway	Under overhaul	Lined maroon	[14]
1944	Hunslet	3180	War Department 75130	Antwerp	Private site, Sellindge	Stored awaiting overhaul	Red	
1944	Hunslet	3183	War Department 75133; WD 138; National Coal Board Woolley Colliery 8	75008 King Faisal of Iraq	Flour Mill, Forest of Dean	Awaiting restoration		Sold into preservation from the NCB in 1982 to the Hallamshire Railway Preservation Society at Penistone. Formerly part of the UK National Collection, now awaiting restoration at the Flour Mill, Bream, Forest of Dean.
1944	Hunslet	3193	War Department 75142, WD 140	Norfolk Regiment	Northampton & Lamport Railway	Operational	Black	January 2023, purchased by Northampton Steam Railway Limited and moved to the Northampton & Lamport Railway
1944	RSH	7136	War Department 75186; WD 150	68013 Royal Pioneer	Peak Rail	Under overhaul		
1944	RSH	7139	War Department 75189, WD 152, N.C.B. No. 8	WD 152 Rennes	Dean Forest Railway	Operational	Longmoor Military Railway Prussian blue	Sold to NCB post war.
1944	RSH	7169	War Department 71515	71515	Pontypool and Blaenavon Railway	Out of service	Indian red - Mech Navvies livery	Sold to NCB post war and used at Swalwell. Converted at East Somerset Railway to resemble J94.Then to Embsay and Bolton Abbey Steam Railway as 68005 Overhauled at the Flour Mill in the Forest of Dean and returned to service in private ownership at Blaenavon in 2010.
1944	RSH	7170	War Department 71516	Welsh Guardsman		Stored	Lined black	Stored at the Severn Valley Railway in 2022 requiring a new cylinder block. Sold and left in 2026.
1944	Hunslet	2868 (rebuilt as 3883 of 1963)	War Department 75019; WD 168	68012 Lord Phil	Epping Ongar Railway	Operational	Lined green	
1945	Hudswell Clarke	1782	War Department 71505, WD 118	LMR 118 Brussels	Keighley and Worth Valley Railway	Stored	Longmoor Military Railway Prussian blue	Originally preserved by the Keighley and Worth Valley Railway from the Longmoor Military Railway.
1945	W.G.Bagnall	2777	War Department 75254, WD 175	Alloa Area No. 7	SRPS at Bo'ness and Kinneil Railway	Operational		Sold to NCB in 1963.
1945	W.G.Bagnall	2779	War Department 75256	No 2779 Gamma	Tanfield Railway	Stored	Black lined red	Spent time working at: Longmoor Military Railway (1945), Brandon C Colliery outside Durham (1946), Vane Tempest Colliery at Seaham (1967) and appeared repainted as 2502/7 in the Stockton and Darlington Railway 150th Anniversary at Shildon (1975). before being bought and operated as sister locomotive Bowes No 20 at the Tanfield Railway whilst on loan to Bo'ness and Kinneil Railway until 1993 when she continued operating at Tanfield.
1945	Hunslet	3207	WD 157 Constantine			Scrapped 1968		One of two Austerities, with Errol Lonsdale, used in the filming of The Great St Trinian's Train Robbery in 1966, it was mocked up with side tanks to resemble a J50 and temporarily renumbered 68961. Scrapped in 1968 by Pollock Brown at Southampton.
1945	Vulcan Foundry	5272	War Department 75282, WD 181 Insein	Haulwen	Gwili Railway	Under overhaul	Lined green	Rebuilt in 1961 by Hunslet (works number 3879).
1945	Vulcan Foundry	5309	War Department 75319	68072	Peak Rail			Sold to NCB after World War II, numbered 72, returned to service in April 2013 at Llangollen Railway, from 2015 at Mangapps railway museum.
1945	RSH	7289	War Department 71480 From 1946 with National Coal Board (North Western) at Walkden and Leigh collieries	Fred	Battlefield Line Railway	Operational		Preserved at the Keighley & Worth Valley Railway from 1969 Now part of the Somerset & Dorset Locomotive Collection and relocated to Tyseley In 1963, this was one of the Austerities fitted with the Porta / Hunslet Gas Producer Combustion System and underfed stoker. Although the stoker had fallen from use by the time of its preservation, the firebox and Kylpor ejector with its distinctive 'Sontaran' chimney are one of the few Austerities so-fitted to survive(also) and the only example in relatively complete condition.
1946	Barclay	2212	War Department 71463; LNER 8078	68078	Private site, Sellindge	Under overhaul	BR black	
1947	Barclay	2215	War Department 71466; LNER 8077 working at Immingham Docks, then NCB no.14 in 1962	68077	Spa Valley Railway	Stalled overhaul. In store.	Unknown	Originally preserved by the Keighley and Worth Valley Railway in 1971 where tested and withdrawn, due for fitting of vacuum brakes and steam heat. On loan to the Spa Valley Railway for overhaul in 2005
1948	Hunslet	3686	National Coal Board	60	Aln Valley Railway	Operational	NCB black	Built for the NCB, with cab and bunker cut down to a smaller loading gauge for working the Lambton Drops, a coal staith at Sunderland.
1950	Hunslet	3694	National Coal Board	Whiston	Foxfield Railway	Under overhaul as at August 2022 (fourth with current owner since March 1983)	Lined green NCB	
1950	Hunslet	3696	National Coal Board	Respite	Ribble Steam Railway	Stored		
1950	Hunslet	3698	National Coal Board	Repulse	Lakeside and Haverthwaite Railway	Operational		
1952	Hunslet	3770	National Coal Board	Norma	Cambrian Heritage Railways	Overhaul started; stopped for lack of funds	Rust	
1952	Hunslet	3776	National Coal Board	8 Warspite	Embsay and Bolton Abbey Steam Railway			
1952	Hunslet	3777	National Coal Board	68030	North Yorkshire Moors Railway	Under Overhaul	BR black	As of July 2023, the loco is now based on the NYMR.
1952	Hunslet	3781	National Coal Board	1 "Thomas"	Mid Hants Railway	Operational	NWR blue	Converted from a saddle-tank to side-tank design to create No. 1 "Thomas" in 1994
1953	Hunslet	3785	National Coal Board	69	North Tyneside Steam Railway	Static exhibit, awaiting overhaul		Hunslett Austerity No.69
1953	Hunslet	3788	National Coal Board	Monckton No.1	Embsay and Bolton Abbey Steam Railway	Stored		
1953	Hunslet	3790	War Department 190	190	Colne Valley Railway	Operational	Army olive green	
1953	Hunslet	3791	War Department 191 Black Knight	23 Holman F Stephens	Kent & East Sussex Railway	Stored	Lined olive green	Withdrawn in August 1968. Sold out of Army service, arrived on K&ESR in February 1972.
1953	Hunslet	3792	War Department 192 Waggoner	WD 192 Waggoner	Isle of Wight Steam Railway	Operational	Longmoor Military Railway Prussian blue	Moved to the Isle of Wight on loan from the National Army Museum in 2005: ownership transferred to IOWSR in 2008.
1953	Hunslet	3793	War Department 193	Shropshire	Ribble Steam Railway	Under overhaul		Named at the Severn Valley Railway in 1977.
1953	Hunslet	3794	War Department 194	10 Cumbria	Embsay & Bolton Abbey Steam Railway	Operational	Furness Railway Indian Red	Previously on the Lakeside and Haverthwaite Railway between 1974 and 2009. Owned by the Furness Railway Trust.
1953	Hunslet	3796	War Department 196 Errol Lonsdale	68011 Errol Lonsdale	Stoomcentrum Maldegem	Operational	Black, After restoration WD green (2016)	Initially preserved on the Kent & East Sussex Railway from the Longmoor Military Railway, where it was used in the filming of The Great St Trinian's Train Robbery in 1966 and Chitty Chitty Bang Bang in 1967. Moved to the Mid Hants Railway prior to 1977, and then to the South Devon Railway in 1992. Sold in 2009 to unnamed private buyer
1953	Hunslet	3797	War Department 197 Sapper	25 Northiam	Kent & East Sussex Railway	Operational. Returned to service 2018	Blue	Arrived on K&ESR in September 1977.
1953	Hunslet	3798	War Department 198 Royal Engineer	WD 198 Royal Engineer	Isle of Wight Steam Railway	Operational	WD green	Moved to the Isle of Wight on loan from the National Army Museum in 1991: ownership transferred to IOWSR in 2008.
1953	Hunslet	3800	War Department 200	200	Colne Valley Railway	Under overhaul		Arrived at CVR June 2014.
1953	Hunslet	3806	National Coal Board	Wilbert	Dean Forest Railway	Withdrawn for major repairs in 2016		Named by the Rev W Awdry in 1987.
1953	Hunslet	3809	National Coal Board	18	North Norfolk Railway	Operational	NCB Green	
1954	Hunslet	3810	National Coal Board	Glendower	South Devon Railway	Stored		
1954	Hunslet	3818	National Coal Board	East Fife Area No. 19	SRPS at Bo'ness and Kinneil Railway	Operational	Green	Previously carried spurious BR Livery and number 68019.
1954	Hunslet	3823	National Coal Board	Warrior	Dean Forest Railway	Under overhaul		
1955	Hunslet	3825	National Coal Board	"LNER 8009"	Stainmore Railway Company at Kirkby Stephen East	Under overhaul	Black	Delivered to Betteshanger Colliery, Kent in 1954. Sold into preservation at Great Central Railway in November 1981, sold to North Norfolk Railway 1993. Bought by two Stainmore Railway Company directors in 2004, then spot-hired. Now back at Kirkby Stephen East, awaiting overhaul.
1955	Hunslet	3829	National Coal Board		Gwili Railway	Stored		
1955	Hunslet	3837	National Coal Board	5	SRPS at Bo'ness and Kinneil Railway	Dismantled		Used at Michael and Comrie Collieries in Scotland.
1956	Hunslet	3839	National Coal Board	Wimblebury	Avon Valley Railway	Operational, Returned to traffic in 2017	Unlined blue with NCB lettering	
1956	Hunslet	3840	National Coal Board	Pamela	Garw Valley Railway	Stored		Originally worked out of Maesteg and St John's Washery, Llynvi Valley. Previously in the possession of the Vale of Glamorgan Railway (now defunct), before being loaned to the Lincolnshire Wold Railway. Ownership transferred to Garw Valley Railway in 2012.
1956	Hunslet	3844	NCB	United Steel Company No.22	Appleby Frodingham Railway	Operational	Lined maroon	On loan from the Appleby Frodingham Railway
1958	Hunslet	3850	Ironstone Quarry Railways	Juno	Isle of Wight Steam Railway	Stored	Green	Transferred to the Isle of Wight from the Ivatt Steam Trust in 2009. On loan to the National Railway Museum from October 2010 and on display at Shildon.
1962	Hunslet	3851	NCB	Cadley Hill No 1	Snibston Discovery Park	Stored	Green	Stored at Snibston Discovery Park
1962	Hunslet	3882	NCB	Rebuilding of 2890 with gas producer combustion system				
1964	Hunslet	3889	NCB	65	Dean Forest Railway	Under overhaul	NCB yellow	Formerly at Buckinghamshire Railway Centre. Moved to Rutland in 1989 and to Dean Forest 2015.
1964	Hunslet	3890	NCB	66	Buckinghamshire Railway Centre	In service	Green	Last Hunslet Austerity built in 1964. Boiler ticket expires in 2024.
