= TDLR 1 to 3, 6, and 8 =

Class of Irish steam locomotives

Tralee & Dingle Light Railway 1 to 3, 6, and 8
Type and origin
- Power type: Steam
- Builder: Hunslet Engine Company
- Serial number: 477–479, 677, 1051
- Build date: 1889 (3), 1898 (1), 1910 (1)
- Total produced: 5
Specifications
- Configuration
  - Whyte: 2-6-0T
  - UIC: 1′C n2t
- Gauge: 3 ft (914 mm)
- Leading dia.: 2 ft 0 in (0.610 m)
- Driver dia.: 3 ft 0 1/2 in (0.927 m)
- Axle load: 8 long tons 10 cwt (19,000 lb or 8.6 t)
- Adhesive weight: 23 long tons 16 cwt (53,300 lb or 24.2 t)
- Fuel type: Coal
- Fuel capacity: 1 long ton 10 cwt (3,400 lb or 1.5 t)
- Water cap.: 750 imperial gallons (3,400 L; 900 US gal)
- Firebox
  - Grate area: 9.75 sq ft (0.906 m^{2})
- Boiler pressure: 150 lbf/in^{2} (1.03 MPa)
- Heating surface
  - Firebox: 66 sq ft (6.1 m^{2})
  - Tubes: 494 sq ft (45.9 m^{2})
- Cylinders: Two, outside
- Cylinder size: 13 in × 18 in (330 mm × 457 mm)
Performance figures
- Tractive effort: 10,630 lbf (47.28 kN)
Career
- Operators: TDLR » Great Southern Railways » CIÉ
- Class: GSR/CIÉ 1T or KN2
- Numbers: 1, 2, 3, 6, 8
- Withdrawn: 1954–1960

The Tralee and Dingle Light Railway (TDLR) locomotives 1, 2, 3, 6, and 8 were 2-6-0T locomotives manufactured by the Hunslet Engine Company of Leeds, England between 1889 and 1910.

The Tralee and Dingle Light Railway was incorporated in 1888. Its construction began soon afterwards and the line opened on 31 March 1891. The first three locomotives arrived from Hunslet Engine Company in 1889 and were used in the construction work. The railway consisted of a 31 1/2-mile (50.7 km) long main line from Tralee to Dingle and a 6-mile (9.7 km) long branch from Castlegregory Junction to Castlegregory. The rail head on Dingle pier was claimed to be the most westerly point reached by a railway in Europe.

These five Hunslet locomotives operated for the Tralee & Dingle and at the 1925 amalgamation and became Great Southern Railways Class 1T or Class KN2.

== History ==
Much of the line was a roadside tramway and the locomotives were adorned accordingly with "skirts", to shield the driving wheels and motion, a bell mounted on the boiler, cowcatchers, headlights etc. Although accepted as a legal requirement for road-side tramway lines the "skirts" were removed after only a short period, giving crews easier access to the oiling points of the motion. As far as can be seen from early photographs of the line these "skirts" never returned. The maximum permitted speed on the roadside lines was 12 mph (19 km/h) but on fenced sections this was raised to 25 mph (40 km/h)

The two batches of Hunslet 2-6-0T's were almost identical, certainly to the eye. The main difference was in the number of boiler tubes, increasing the heating surface in the later batch gave a slightly higher tractive effort (by around 1,000 lbf).

All T&D locomotives carried their numbers on cast plates attached to the side tanks.

Orig.No.	Re-No.	Builders	Works No.	Date	Scrapped	Notes
1	1T	Hunslet	477	1889	1955	
2	2T	Hunslet	478	1889	1955	
3	3T	Hunslet	479	1889	1959	To Inchicore Works 1939 / CLR, 1941
6	6T	Hunslet	667	1898	1960	To Inchicore Works 1950 / WCR, Jan.1953 / Inchicore Works, Dec.1955 / CLR, 1957
8 (2nd)	8T	Hunslet	1051	1910	1956	WCR, Nov.1953 / Inchicore Works, Dec.1955 / Withdrawn from service 1.01.1955

Locomotive No. 1 was involved in the Camp accident in 1893 when the train “ran away” down the 1 in 29 (3.4%) gradient towards a sharp curve leading onto a bridge over the river. It was said that it hit the curve doing 40 mph (64 km/h) and went into the river, the locomotive losing a sandbox which was on the top of the boiler behind the chimney.

Locomotive No. 6 featured more than once in GSR accident reports. The locomotive wasted no time in featuring on report as its first GSR accident was on the new company's first day of operation when it hit a car, and there cannot have been many about in January 1925. In later years it was involved in the running down of a travelling circus. The worst of these accidents, however, occurred when the locomotive came off the rails on the approach to Lispole viaduct, finishing halfway down the embankment. A different No. 6, from the Cork and Muskerry Light Railway, was transferred to the T&D after the former line's closure, and may have been the engine involved in a famous incident with a steam roller, which formed the basis of a similar incident where Sir Handel played the part in the Rev. W. Awdry. story "Gallant Old Engine".

Locomotives No.3 and No.6 were transferred to the Cavan and Leitrim railway to supplement their motive power. No.6 was used on the dismantling trains following the closure of the Cavan and Leitrim Railway before itself being scrapped.

== Livery ==
The locomotives were painted dark green lined out with red between two cream lines. The buffer beams were painted red. In the days of the Great Southern Railways the locomotives were painted in a plain grey livery, the buffer beams being red.
