= Tralee and Dingle Light Railway =

Former railway in County Kerry, Ireland

Overview
- Dates of operation: 1891–1953

Technical
- Track gauge: 3 ft (914 mm)
- Length: 38 miles (61 km) (1922)
- Track length: 39 miles 28 chains (63.3 km) (1922)

The Tralee and Dingle Light Railway and Tramway was a 51 km (32 mi), 914 mm (3 ft) narrow-gauge railway running between Tralee and Dingle, with a 10 km (6.2 mi) branch from Castlegregory Junction to Castlegregory, in County Kerry on the west coast of Ireland. It operated between 1891 and 1953; the Castlegregory branch closed shortly prior to the outbreak of the Second World War. It was one of the most westerly railway lines in Europe, but the terminus of the Valentia Harbour branch at 10.277785° was further west.

== Early years ==
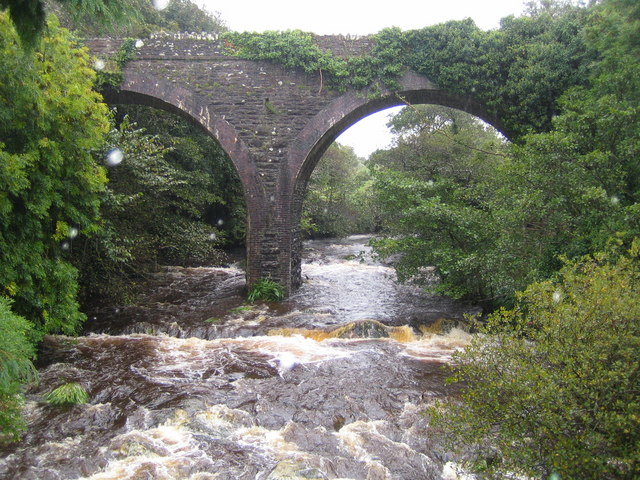
Disused railway viaduct looking upstream on the Finglas River from Curraduff Bridge on the N86 road to Dingle

The railway was built as cheaply as possible, largely following adjacent roads, resulting in some very tight curves and severe gradients. The railway opened on 31 March 1891, but from the start income failed to cover operating expenses. In March 1893, the Board of Trade held an inquiry into poor management and operating practices on the railway; nevertheless a fatal accident (involving a runaway train) took place at Curraduff in May of the same year. The railway continued to require public subsidies from local ratepayers; these were able to be reduced in 1898 after a grant from the Treasury (although the line continued to require subsidies throughout its existence). In 1907, a further grant of £23,000 (just over €2 million at 2007/8 values) was made to allow the scene of the accident at Curraduff to be bypassed, and other improvements made.

== Conflict ==
Operations on the railway were severely disrupted between 1921 and 1923. The line was closed in 1921 on the orders of the British Army (during the struggle for independence prior to the creation of the Irish Free State). Services were also suspended at times (and infrastructure damaged) during the Irish Civil War of 1922–23. The railway was taken over by the Great Southern Railways on Thursday 1 January 1925; a train had a collision with a car on a level crossing on the first day of GSR ownership.

== Operations ==
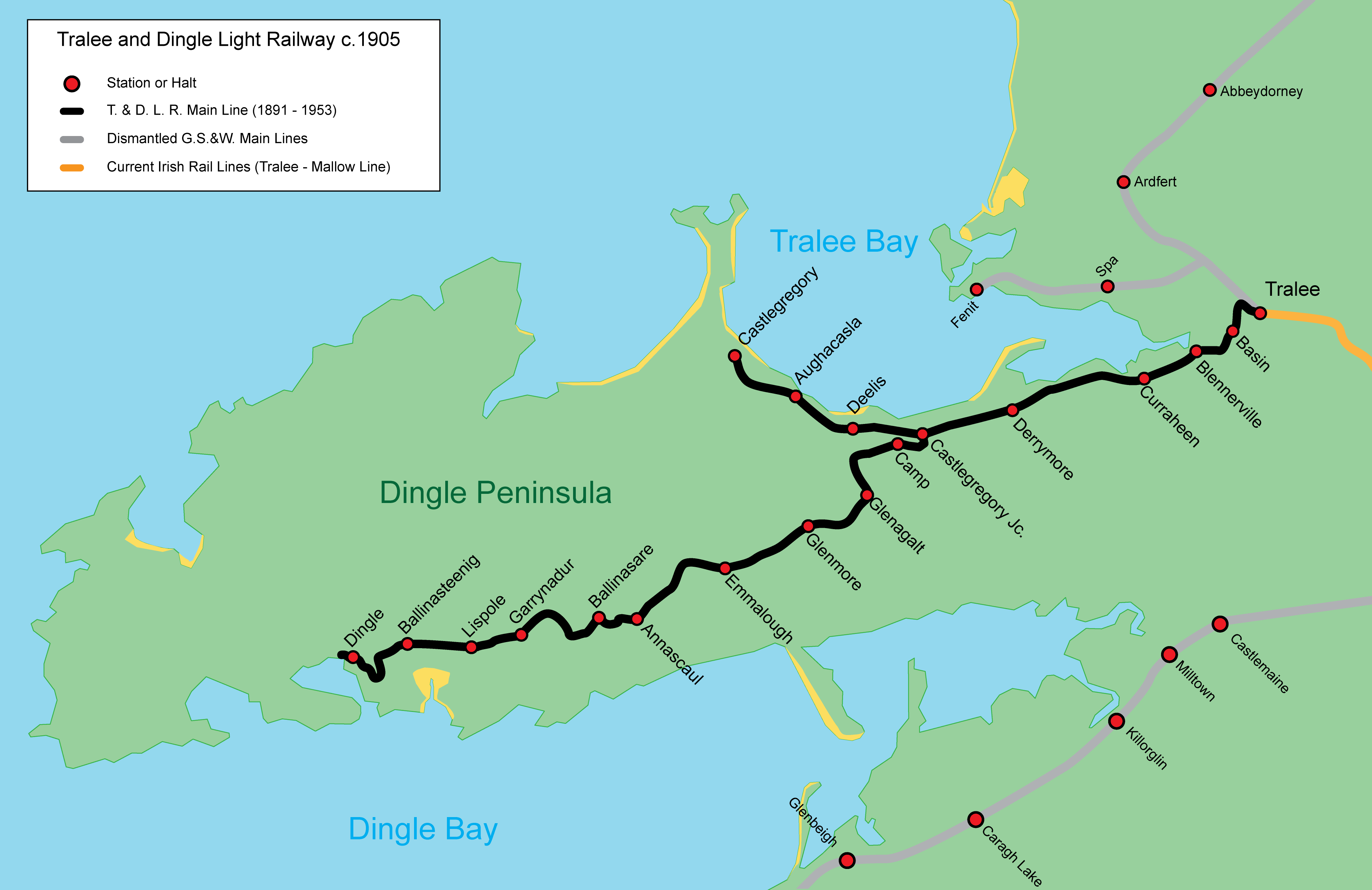
The T&D in 1905

The line was 31 mi (50 km) long, broken into approximately 10 mi (16 km) sections at Castlegregory Junction and Annascaul, where the locomotives would take water if required, and where trains could pass each other.

In 1910, at the peak of the line's usage, there were two return passenger trains, morning and evening, which on market days, Tuesday and Saturday, made a third midday trip. The trains passed one another at Castlegregory Junction, apart from the morning trips which passed at Annascaul. The journey time was two hours and 30 minutes.

The Castlegregory branch train met every train at the junction for the six-mile branch. On Saturday afternoons it ran an extra trip through to Tralee and back.

On Sundays, only the morning trip from Tralee and the afternoon return from Dingle operated, plus two connecting round trips from Castlegregory.

By 1922, there were just the morning and afternoon return trips on the main line, which passed at Castlegregory Junction, and two round trips on the branch to connect. Journey times were still the same. Sunday services had ceased.

By 1938, there were still two round trips daily on the main line, still taking the same time, but the times were altered so that in the morning a Tralee-based train ran out to Dingle and back, while in the afternoon a Tralee-based train did the round trip. The Castlegregory branch train ran through to Tralee and back in the morning, as there were no convenient main line trains to connect with, but in the afternoon made a shuttle to the junction as before.

Despite the rundown in the line's usage over time, all the timetables required three locomotives to operate the passenger services each day. In addition there were freight services, normally a round trip each day with general freight, plus extra services on market days to move cattle between Tralee and Dingle, which were the last trains to use the line. The cattle trains to the end were of sufficient size to require two locomotives. Some locomotives (3, 4, 5 and 6) were transferred to the Cavan and Leitrim Railway when no longer required on the T&D or after its closure.

== Later years ==
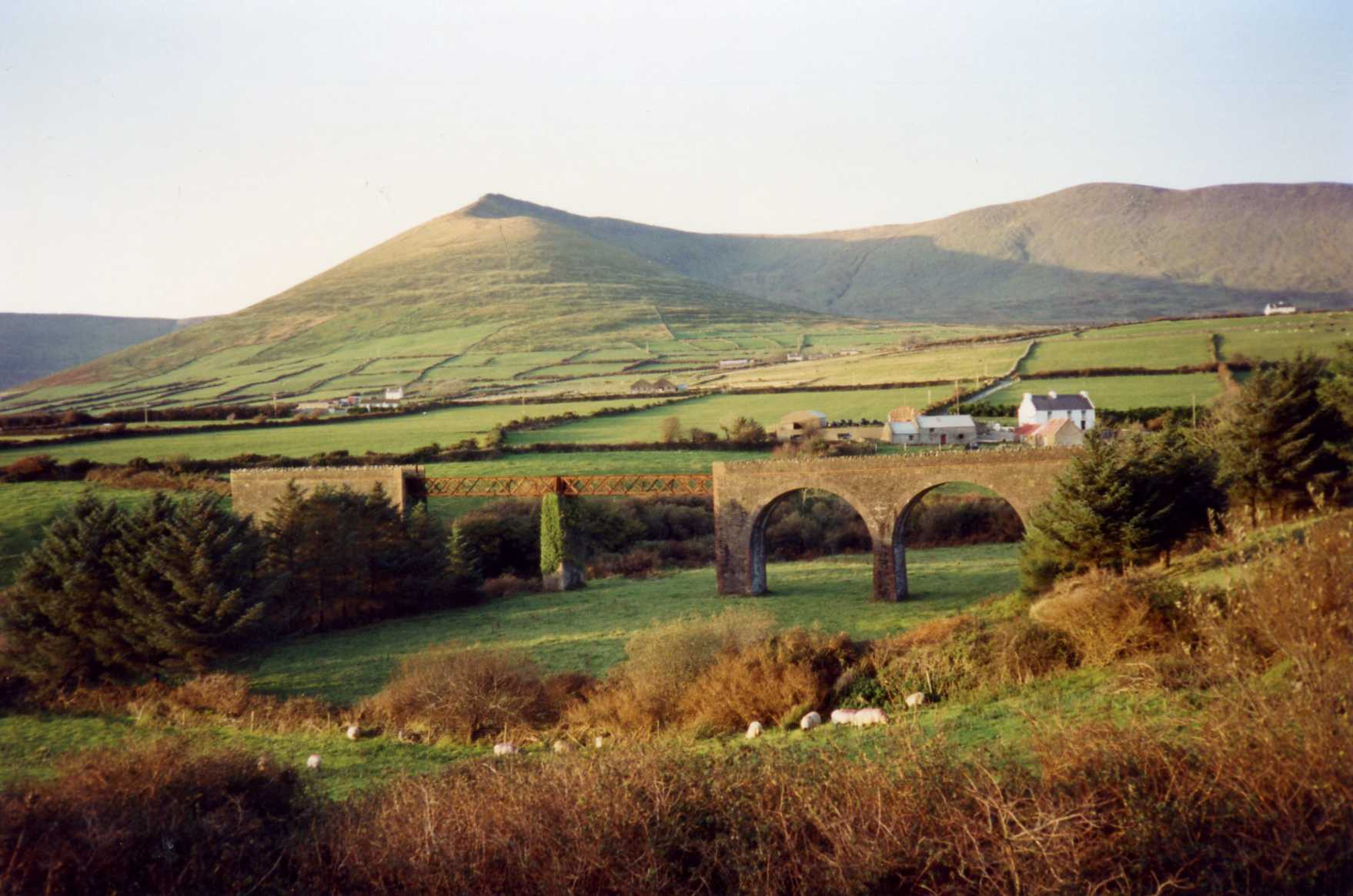
Lispole viaduct

The road between Tralee and Dingle was improved in the 1930s, allowing buses and lorries to effectively compete with the railway. The infrastructure of the railway becoming increasingly dilapidated and, in parts, unsafe. The passenger train service was timetabled to run from Dingle to Tralee in 155 minutes (for a journey of little over 31 miles), whilst the competing bus service took 105 minutes.

On Monday 17 April 1939, all passenger services were withdrawn; the Castlegregory branch was closed completely. A single daily goods train continued to run until 1947, when coal shortages forced its temporary withdrawal. Thereafter, a special train (for cattle) was operated once per month in connection with the fair at Dingle. These trains finally ended in June 1953.

An extraordinary event occurred at Dingle station on Thursday 13 June 1940, after the line's closure to passengers. A German spy named Walter Simon arrived at the station and asked when the next train would depart (not realising that only freight services were still operating). Simon had been landed by a German submarine, U-38, during the previous night. He then made his way by bus to Tralee and thence by train to Dublin. Following his enquiry at Dingle station, the Garda Síochána were informed and he was trailed by detectives. He was arrested on arrival in Dublin and interned for the duration of the War (known in neutral Ireland as "The Emergency").

== Restoration ==
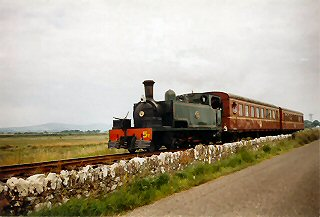
Restored No. T5 approaching Blennerville

A 3 km (1.8 mi) section was reopened as a preserved line in 1993 between the Aquadome in Tralee and Blennerville Windmill. As of 2013, the railway was no longer in operation.

Extract from the appeal page from Ted Polet, webmaster of the 009 Society Dutch Group

Early in 2009, on this page an appeal was published to the Tralee Urban District Council, the owners of the railway, to take steps to safeguard this heritage locomotive. In May, 2009, a representative of the Tralee UDC informed me that the agreement with the previous (private) operator of the railway was terminated. The parts of the locomotive were put under cover and during the summer a diesel locomotive was put into service hauling a single carriage between Tralee (Aquadome terminus) and Blennerville. All this was confirmed by repeated reports by Holger Lorenz on his Tralee Blog.

Although restoring 5T to working order may be far away, at least it will not rot to pieces as it would have, had the boiler, tanks and cab been left out in the open. Another good development is services being restored, even if diesel-hauled. This way the railway will at least have a chance to keep going.

== See also ==
- History of rail transport in Ireland
- List of narrow-gauge railways in Ireland

=== TDLR locomotives ===
- TDLR 1 to 3, 6, and 8
- TDLR 5
- TDLR 7 and 8

=== Other narrow gauge railways in South West Ireland ===
- Cork, Blackrock and Passage Railway
- Cork and Muskerry Light Railway
- Listowel and Ballybunion Railway (Lartigue Monorail)
- Schull and Skibbereen Railway
- West Clare Railway
