= Hunslet Engine Company =

English rolling stock manufacturer

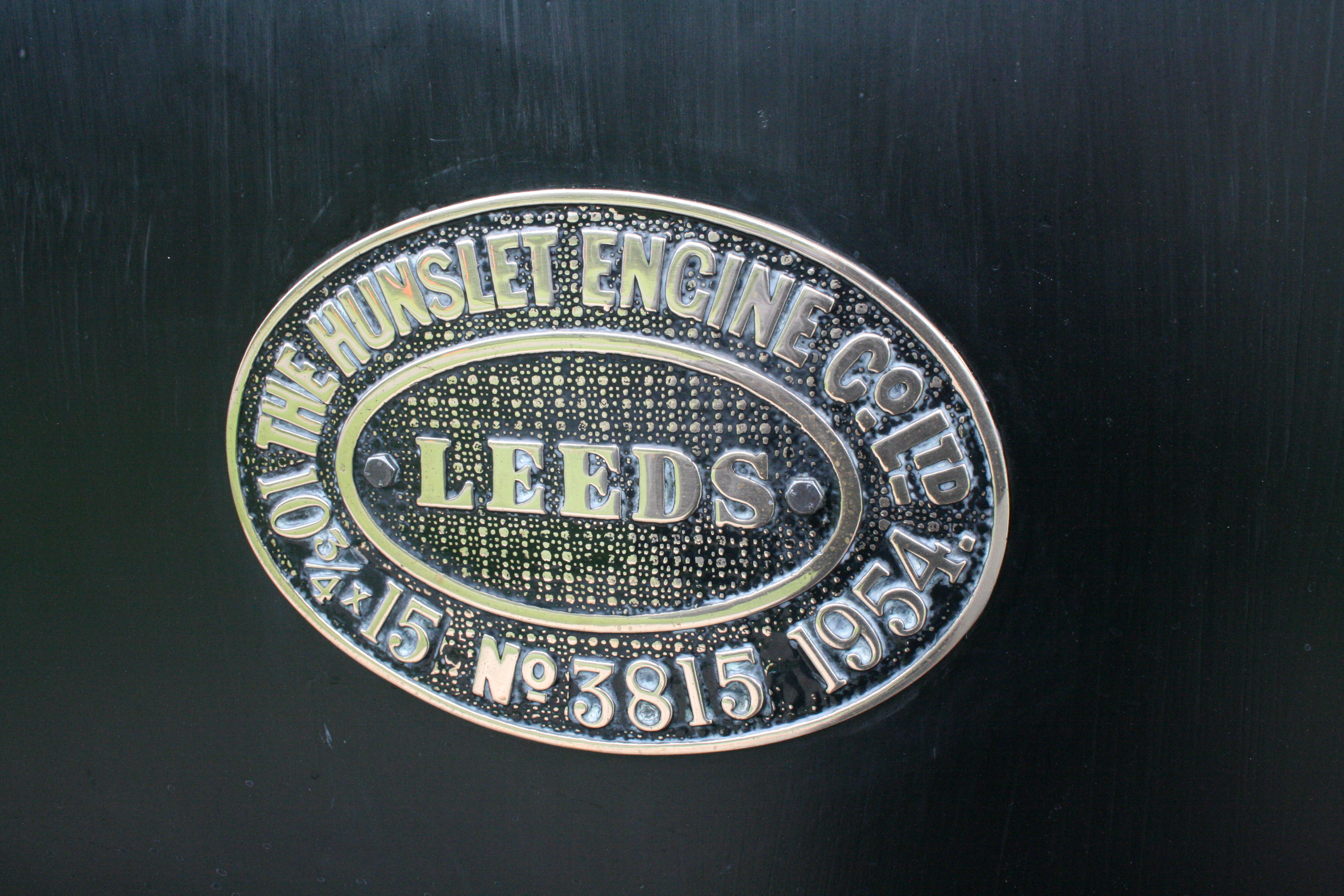
- Industry: Railway Locomotive Engineering
- Founded: 1864
- Headquarters: Leeds, England
- Number of locations: 2 Heavy Overhaul Workshops 1 Administrative Centre
- Area served: Worldwide
- Products: Shunting locomotives
- Services: Locomotive hire, overhaul and maintenance
- Parent: Ed Murray & Sons Ltd.

The Hunslet Engine Company is a locomotive building company, founded in 1864 in Hunslet, England. It manufactured steam locomotives for over 100 years and currently manufactures diesel shunting locomotives. The company owns a substantial fleet of Industrial and depot shunting locomotives which are available for hire. The company is part of Ed Murray & Sons Ltd.

== History ==
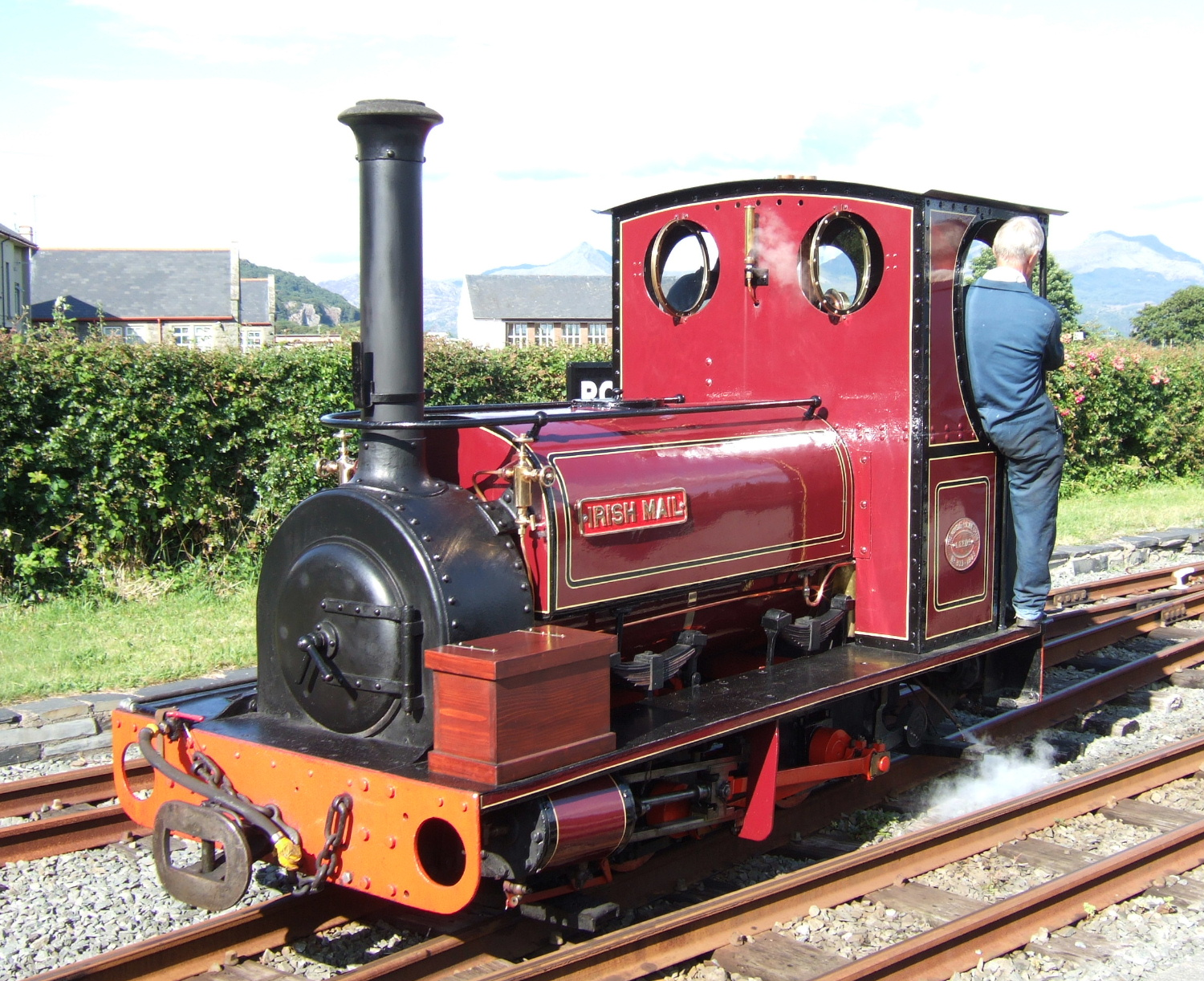
Irish Mail is typical of many small engines built at Hunslet for use in quarries

=== The early years 1864–1901 ===
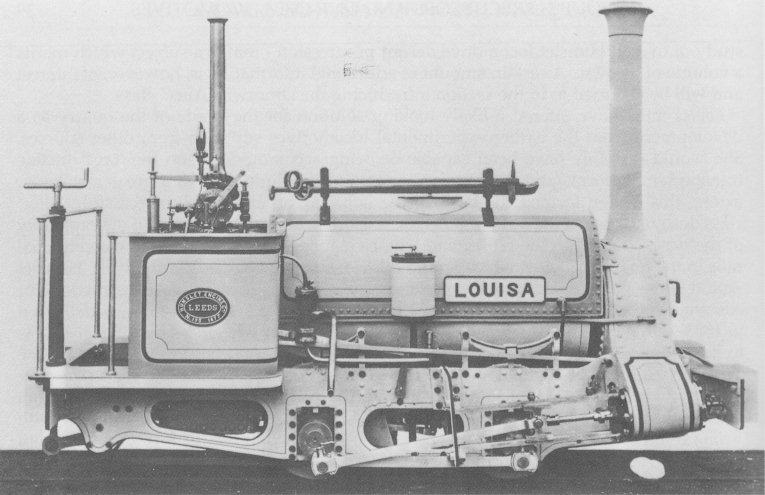
Louisa, works number 195 of 1877, one of the earliest examples of the Quarry Hunslet type

The company was founded in 1864 at Jack Lane in Hunslet by John Towlerton Leather, a civil engineering contractor, who appointed James Campbell (son of Alexander Campbell, a Leeds engineer) as his works manager.

The first engine was completed in 1865. It was Linden, a standard gauge 0-6-0ST delivered to Brassey and Ballard, a railway civil engineering contractor as were several of the firm's early customers. Other customers included collieries. This basic standard gauge shunting and short haul "industrial" engine was to be the main-stay of Hunslet production for many years.

In 1871, James Campbell bought the company for £25,000 (payable in five instalments over two years) and the firm remained in the Campbell family ownership for many years. Between 1865 and 1870, the company had averaged fewer than ten locomotives a year but, in 1871, seventeen were built, rising over the next 30 years to a maximum of 34.

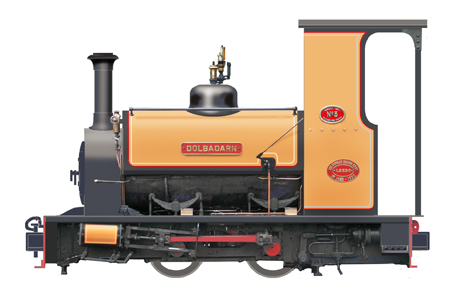
Dolbadarn built for the Dinorwic Slate Quarries in 1922 and now on the Llanberis Lake Railway

In 1870, Hunslet constructed its first narrow gauge engine Dinorwic, a diminutive 1 ft 10 3/4 in (578 mm) gauge 0-4-0ST for the Dinorwic Slate Quarry at Llanberis. This engine, later renamed Charlie, was the first of 20 similar engines built for this quarry and did much to establish Hunslet as a major builder of quarry engines. The quarry was linked to Port Dinorwic by a 4 ft (1,219 mm) gauge line for which Hunslet built three 0-6-0T engines Dinorwic, Padarn and Velinheli. Much larger than the normal quarry type, 1 ft 10 3/4 in gauge 0-4-0ST engines Charles, Blanche and Linda were built between 1882 and 1893 for use on the Penrhyn Quarry Railway "main line" between Bethesda and Port Penrhyn in North Wales. (Note: Two of these still operate on the Ffestiniog Railway and Charles is preserved in the Penrhyn Castle Railway Museum)

Many short wheelbase 0-6-0T locomotives were supplied to the Manchester Ship Canal Company in the 1880s.

The first Hunslet engine built for export was its No. 10, an 0-4-0ST shipped via Hull and Rotterdam to Java. By 1902, Hunslet had supplied engines to over thirty countries, often opening up new markets. In Ireland, Hunslet supplied engines to several of the newly opened narrow gauge lines and also in 1887 built the three unorthodox 0-3-0 engines for the Lartigue Monorail system used by the Listowel Ballybunion Railway.

From 1873 onwards, many Hunslet locomotives were exported to Australia for use on both main line and lesser lines.

=== 1901–1939 ===
In 1901, James Campbell was still in charge as proprietor and his four sons were all working for the company, including the eldest son Alexander III who had taken over as works manager on the death of his Uncle George in 1890. In 1902, the company was reorganised as a private limited company with the name Hunslet Engine Company Ltd. but was still a family business. Following the death of James Campbell in 1905, the chairmanship passed to Alexander III and brother Robert became works manager, while brother Will retained the role of secretary and traveller with a seat on the board.

At about this time, Hunslet was building a series of 2-6-2Ts for the Sierra Leone Government Railway, design elements of which were included in the construction of the famous Russell a 1 ft 11 1/2 in (597 mm) gauge engine built for the Portmadoc, Beddgelert & South Snowdon Railway.

Following family disagreements, both Will and the youngest brother Gordon left the company and a serious injury left Robert disabled and unable to continue as works manager. The post of works manager was advertised and Edgar Alcock, then assistant works manager at the Gorton Foundry of Beyer-Peacock, was appointed in 1912. Alcock came to Hunslet at a time of change when the industry was being asked for far larger and more powerful locomotives than had ever been required in the past. This was true at Hunslet, which found its overseas customers asking for very large engines. One example was an order for two 86 ton 2-8-4Ts from the Antofagasta, Chile & Bolivia Railway.

During the First World War, overseas orders dried up. The company, like many others, found itself employing women on the shop floor and engaged in the manufacture of munitions. It continued to produce limited numbers of locomotives, significant examples being lightweight narrow gauge 4-6-0T designs for the War Department Light Railways.

After the First World War, Hunslet was once more able to attract overseas orders and it also received a series of repeat orders from the London, Midland & Scottish Railway for 90 LMS Fowler Class 3F "Jinty" 0-6-0T shunting engines. During the 1930s, Hunslet built its largest locomotives, two 0-8-0T engines, built for a special train-ferry loading job in China – they were at that date the largest and most powerful tank engines ever built. A year or so later, the same design formed the basis for an 0-8-0 tender engine for India. Many other "large-engine" orders were received in these inter-war years.

Other independent British manufacturers failed to survive the depression of the 1920s and 30s and Hunslet acquired the patterns, rights and designs of other builders including Kerr, Stuart & Company and the Avonside Engine Company.

=== 1930–2000 ===
John Alcock, who, following in his father's footsteps, became managing director of Hunslet in 1958, recalled his father telling him circa 1920, when he was still a schoolboy, that his main endeavour for the company would be in the application of the internal combustion engine to railway locomotion. Throughout the 1930s, Hunslet worked on the perfecting of the diesel locomotive.

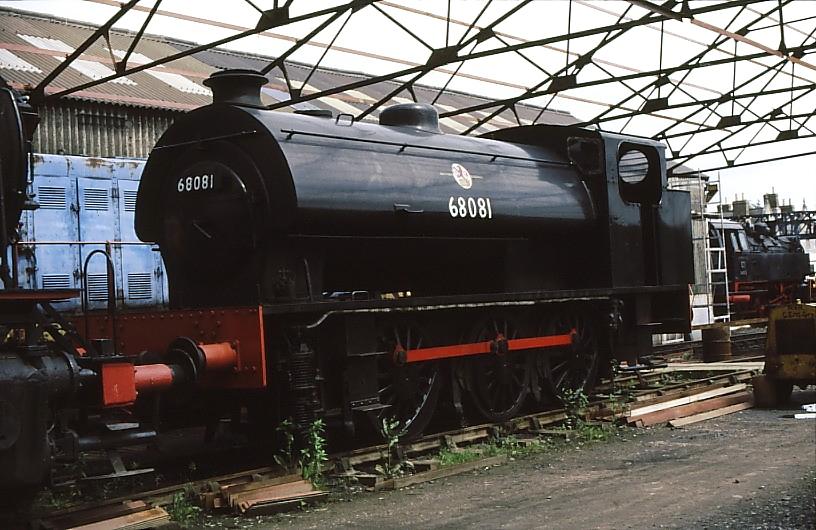
Austerity 68081

During the Second World War, the company again served the country well in the manufacture of munitions, but it also built engines, both steam and diesel for the war effort. Noteworthy is its role in the production of the "Austerity" 0-6-0ST shunting locomotive. It was an austerity revision of the 50550 shunter design, itself a development of the Hunslet 48150 shunter design, of which 16 had been built pre-war. Hunslet produced 149 Austerities during the hostilities, and sub-contracted construction of almost 200 more. A total of 485 Austerities were built by Hunslet and other builders between 1943 and 1964, of which over 70 examples have been preserved.

Locomotive construction resumed after the war. Important in post-war production was the Hunslet flame-proof diesel engine for use in the coal mines, as well as further batches of Austerity shunters for the National Coal Board (NCB) and the British Army, and rebuilding some older Austerities, work which continued into the early 1960s. The last three Austerities were sold in 1970, one directly to preservation, one for scrap and one to the NCB.

The last industrial steam engine built in Britain was built at Hunslet in 1971 for export to Trangkil sugar mill in Central Java, Indonesia. (Note: This engine was acquired by the Statfold Barn Railway in 2004 and returned to Britain, being regauged and named "Trangkil".)

The "Jack Lane, Hunslet, Leeds" works was closed in 1995, the last order being a batch of narrow gauge diesel locomotives for tunnelling on the Jubilee Line Extension of the London Underground.

=== 2000–present ===
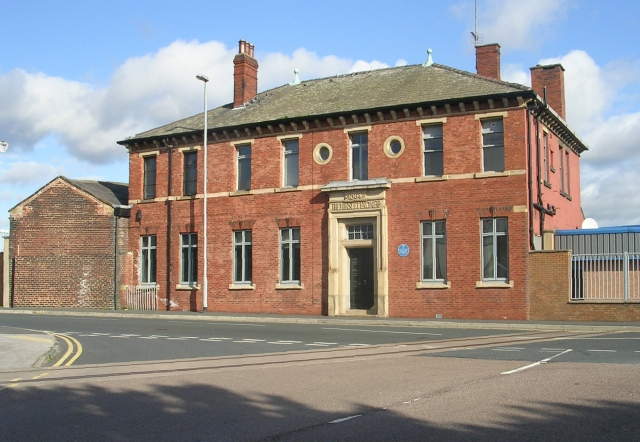
The former Hunslet works in 2009

In 2004, the Hunslet Engine Company was acquired by the LH Group. Production was moved to Barton-under-Needwood while other operations remained in Leeds.

In 2006, the company manufactured remote-controlled diesel electric shunters for John M. Henderson & Co to be supplied to POSCO's coking plant in South Korea. In the same year, several orders for underground and mining diesel locomotives were completed.

In 2007, Hunslet began developing a new family of locomotives ranging from shunters to vehicles weighing up to 100 tons. The first locomotive of the new class, the DH60C, a three-axle C diesel hydraulic shunting locomotive, was unveiled in July 2010.

The company also operated a locomotive hire business (including a British Rail Class 08 shunter acquired in 2006), mainly of industrial shunting locomotives.

In 2012, LH Group was sold to Wabtec for US$48 million. The company owns the rights to the names and designs of a number of former British locomotive manufacturers including Andrew Barclay, Avonside Engine Company, North British Locomotive Company, Greenwood & Batley, Hudswell Clarke, John Fowler & Co, Kerr, Stuart & Company, Kitson & Company and Manning Wardle. It also maintains and supplies spare parts for those brands. In 2021, the business was purchased by Ed Murray & Sons.

==== The Hunslet Steam Co. ====
The Hunslet Steam Co. is part of the LH Group. The company is involved in new-build steam locomotives (including two Quarry Hunslet 0-4-0ST locomotives), boiler making and locomotive maintenance.

== Related companies ==
=== Hunslet-Barclay Ltd ===
The locomotive manufacturer Andrew Barclay was acquired by the Hunslet group in 1972, and renamed Hunslet-Barclay. It chiefly undertook maintenance and refurbishment of diesel multiple unit passenger trains at the Andrew Barclay Caledonia Works in Kilmarnock. In 2003, the LH Group acquired the locomotive interests of the company. In October 2007, Hunslet-Barclay went into receivership and in November was purchased by FKI (the owner of Brush Traction) and renamed Brush-Barclay. In 2011, Brush Traction and Brush-Barclay were purchased by Wabtec.

== Preserved locomotives ==
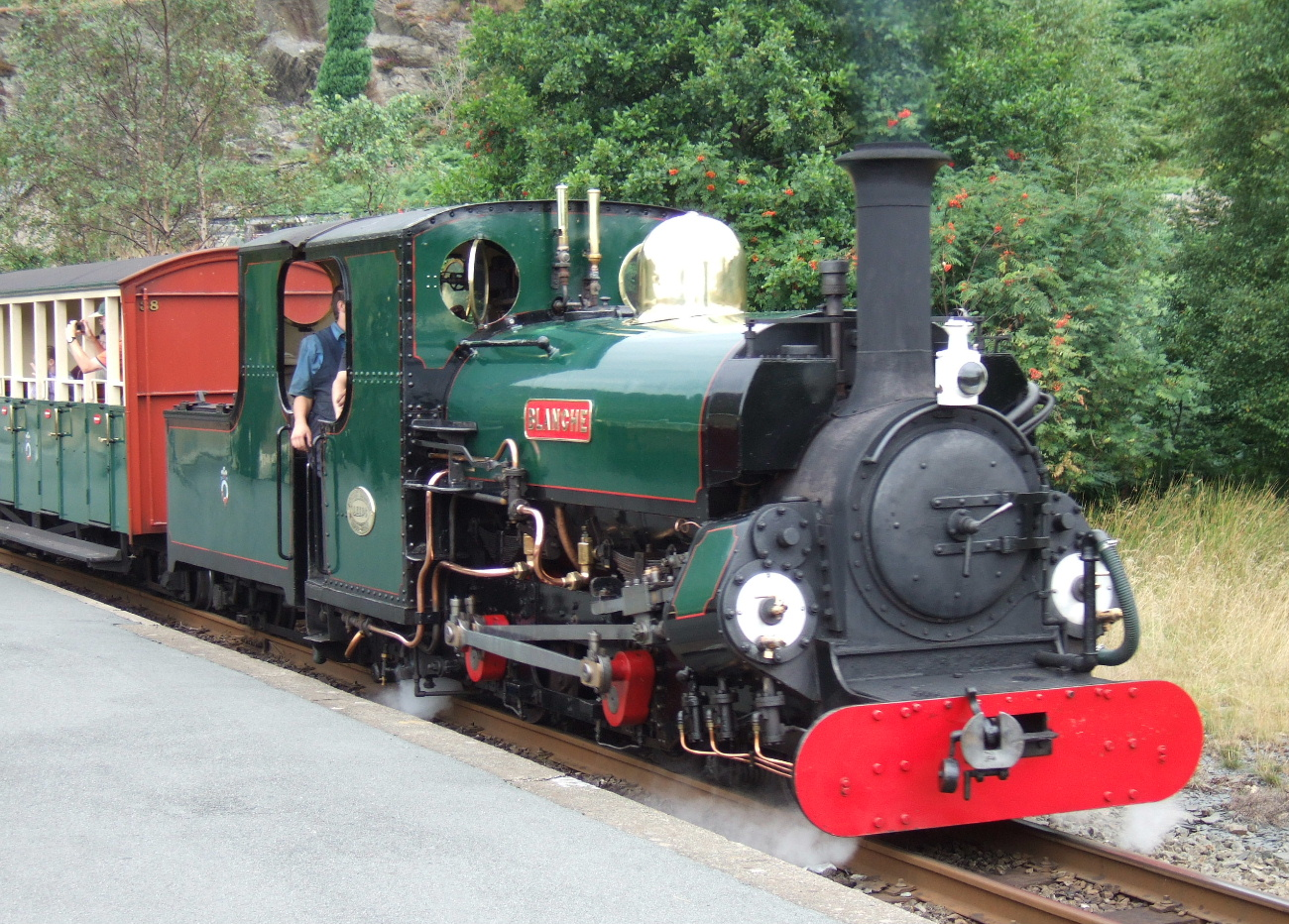
Much-rebuilt Hunslet Blanche running on the Ffestiniog Railway

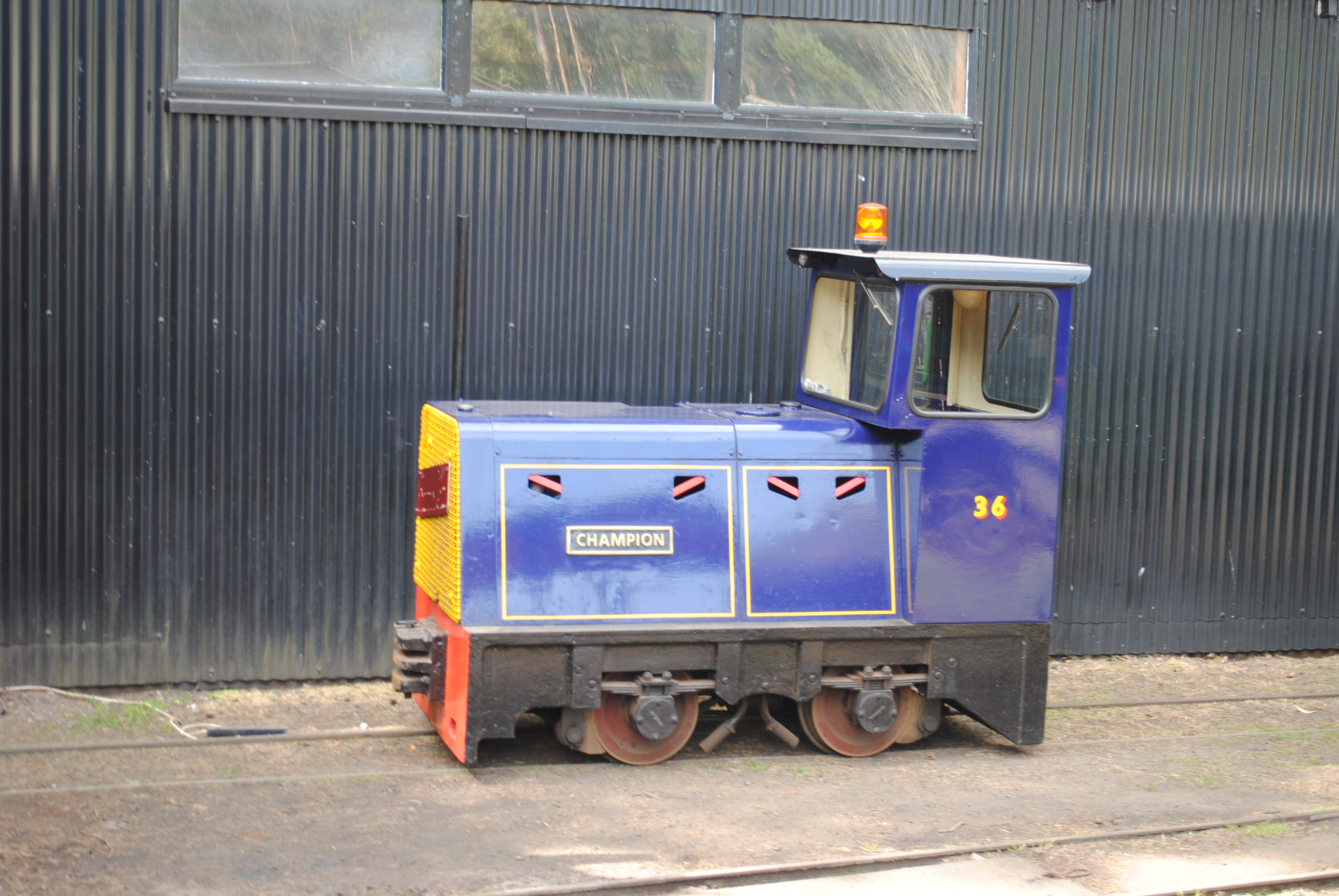
Hunslet AD36 "Champion" at the Old Kiln Light Railway

=== Preserved examples ===
- No. 1440 Airedale – Preserved and currently stored at Embsay & Bolton Abbey Steam Railway
- No. 1 Brookes
- No. 11 – Preserved and currently undergoing cosmetic restoration at the Middleton Railway
- No. 243 – Preserved and currently undergoing cosmetic restoration at the Fundación Camilo José Cela assignment Madrid Railway Museum (Fundación de los Ferrocarriles Españoles), Spain
- No. 686 Lady Armaghdale – Preserved and on static display at Highley, on the Severn Valley Railway
- No. 1444 Preserved and running at Museum of Transport & Technology, Auckland, New Zealand
- No. 1800 – Preserved and running on the Nene Valley Railway
- No. 1821
- No. 1873 Jessie – Preserved and running on the Pontypool & Blaenavon Railway
- No. 1982 Ring Haw – Preserved and running on the North Norfolk Railway
- No. 2705 Beatrice – Preserved and running on the Embsay & Bolton Abbey Steam Railway
- No. 2868 B&W Engineering –
- No. 3694 Whiston – preserved an in operational condition at the Foxfield Railway though on loan at end of March 2019 at the Churnet Valley Railway
- No. 3715 Primrose No. 2 – Preserved and currently undergoing an overhaul at Embsay & Bolton Abbey Steam Railway
- No. 3782 Arthur – Preserved and undergoing overhaul at the Buckinghamshire Railway Centre
- No. 3783 Darfield No. 1 – Preserved and running on the Chasewater Railway
- Holly Bank No. 3 – Preserved and running on the Chasewater Railway
- Jack's Green – Preserved and currently stored at the Nene Valley Railway
- No. 1589 Newstead – Preserved and undergoing overhaul at the Spa Valley Railway
- Robert Nelson No. 4
- No. 79 "Plum" – 16 inch 0-6-0ST, preserved on static display at the NSW Rail Museum, Thirlmere, Australia
- No. 2705 – 2-6-0+T loco, preserved and currently running at the NSW Rail Museum, Thirlmere, Australia
- No. 1168 – 0-6-0ST built in 1914; preserved and on static display at Fort San Andres Museum, Port-of-Spain, Trinidad' under the unofficial number "42"

=== Ireland ===
- Tralee and Dingle Light Railway, County Kerry
- Ulster Folk and Transport Museums, County Down

=== Israel ===
- PEC H7 number 353 (Hunslet No. 1265) – 4-6-0T built in 1917; preserved and on static display at Old Gesher Museum, Kibbutz Gesher

=== Sri Lanka ===
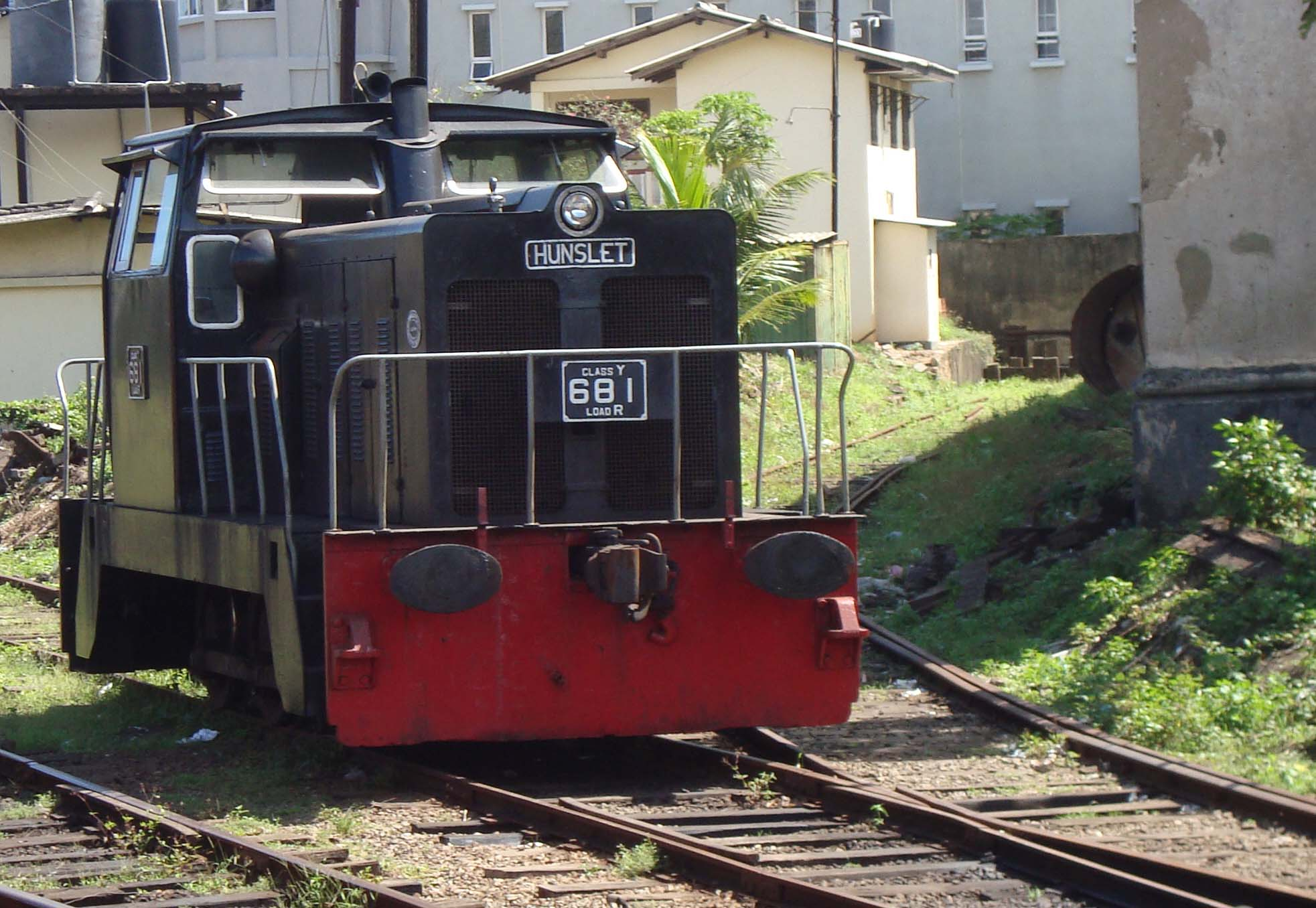
Sri Lanka Railways Class Y, No 681 working in Galle, Sri Lanka

- Sri Lanka Railways uses Hunslet diesel shunting locomotives in most railway yards.

=== New Zealand ===
- NZR/PWD Y class number 542 (Hunslet No. 1444) is preserved at the Museum of Transport & Technology.

=== Brazil ===
- No. 106 is displayed on the Estrada de Ferro de Baturité Museum, in Baturité, state of Ceará, northeast region of Brazil.

== See also ==
- List of Hunslet narrow-gauge locomotive designs
