= 0-3-0 =

Monorail locomotive wheel arrangement

0-3-0 is a type of wheel arrangement for a monorail steam locomotive.

== History ==
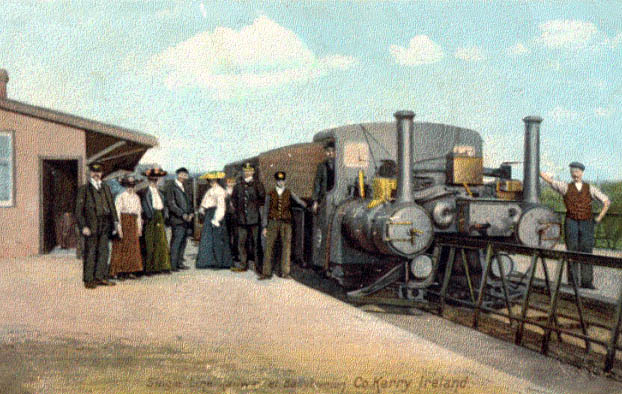
Listowel and Ballybunion Railway 1900

This most unusual wheel arrangement was only used for specialised monorails.

=== Listowel and Ballybunion Railway ===
The Lartigue Monorail locomotives used on the Listowel and Ballybunion Railway were of 0-3-0 wheel arrangement, although they also required non–load-bearing guide wheels. These locomotives were built by the Hunslet Engine Company, Leeds in 1888.

=== Patiala State Monorail Trainways ===
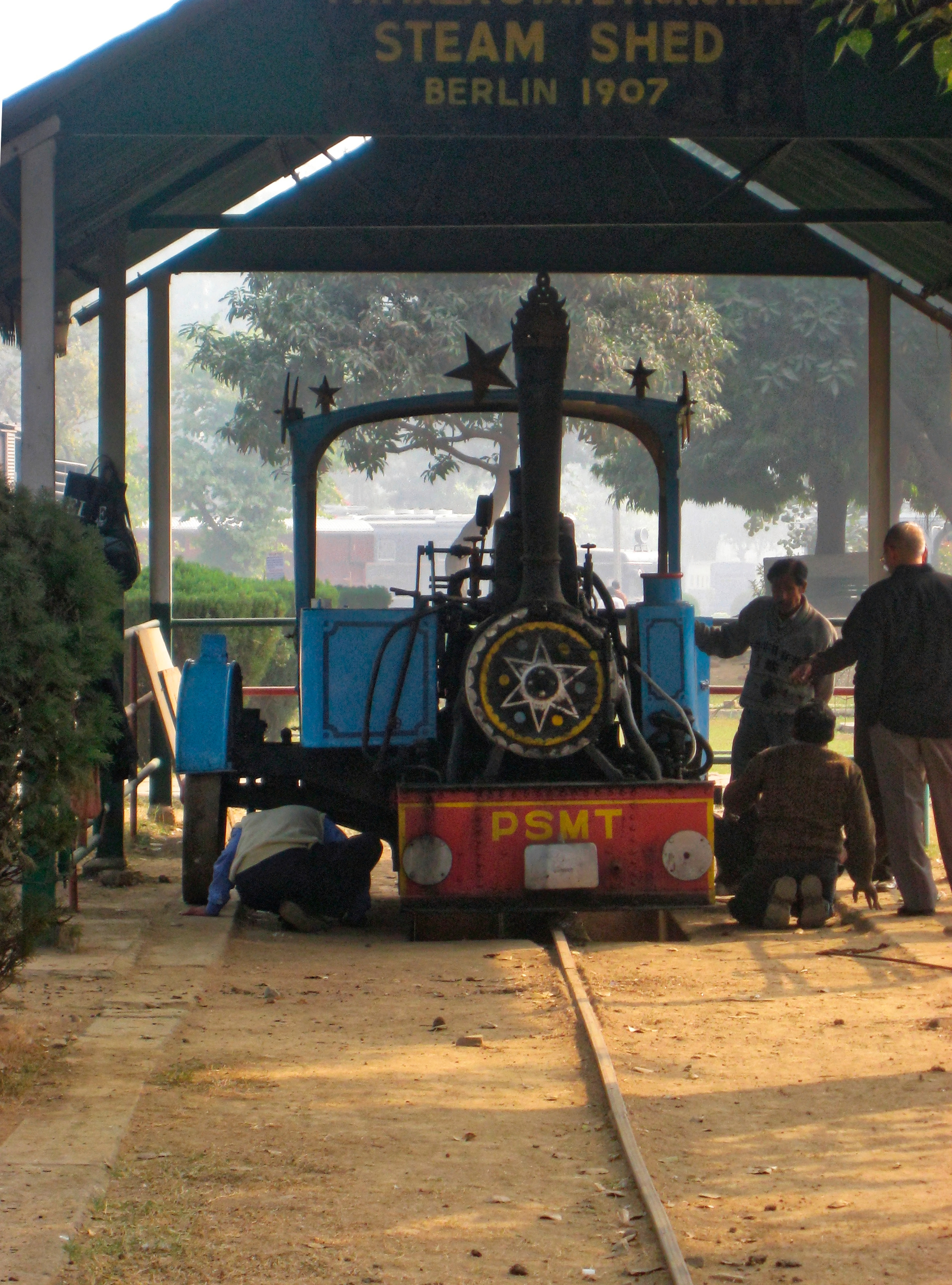
Patiala monorail locomotive, at the Indian National Railway Museum

Four locomotives were built with this wheel arrangement in 1907 for the Patiala State Monorail Trainways, a monorail line in Patiala, India. They had double flanged driving wheels and the locomotives had an outrigger wheel that ran on the ground. The builder was Orenstein & Koppel of Berlin. One locomotive is preserved in working order at the National Rail Museum, New Delhi, New Delhi.

Also, in the Russian notation that counts axles instead of wheels, 0-3-0 is identical to Whyte's 0-6-0.
