= Lartigue Monorail =

Type of early monorail

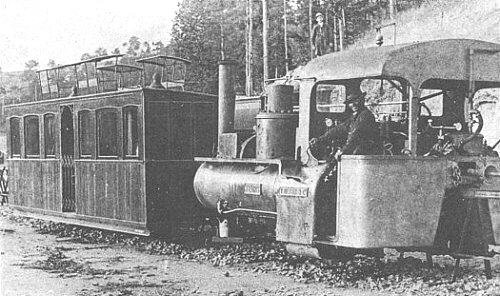
A locomotive and passenger car of the Feurs-Panissières Line, France

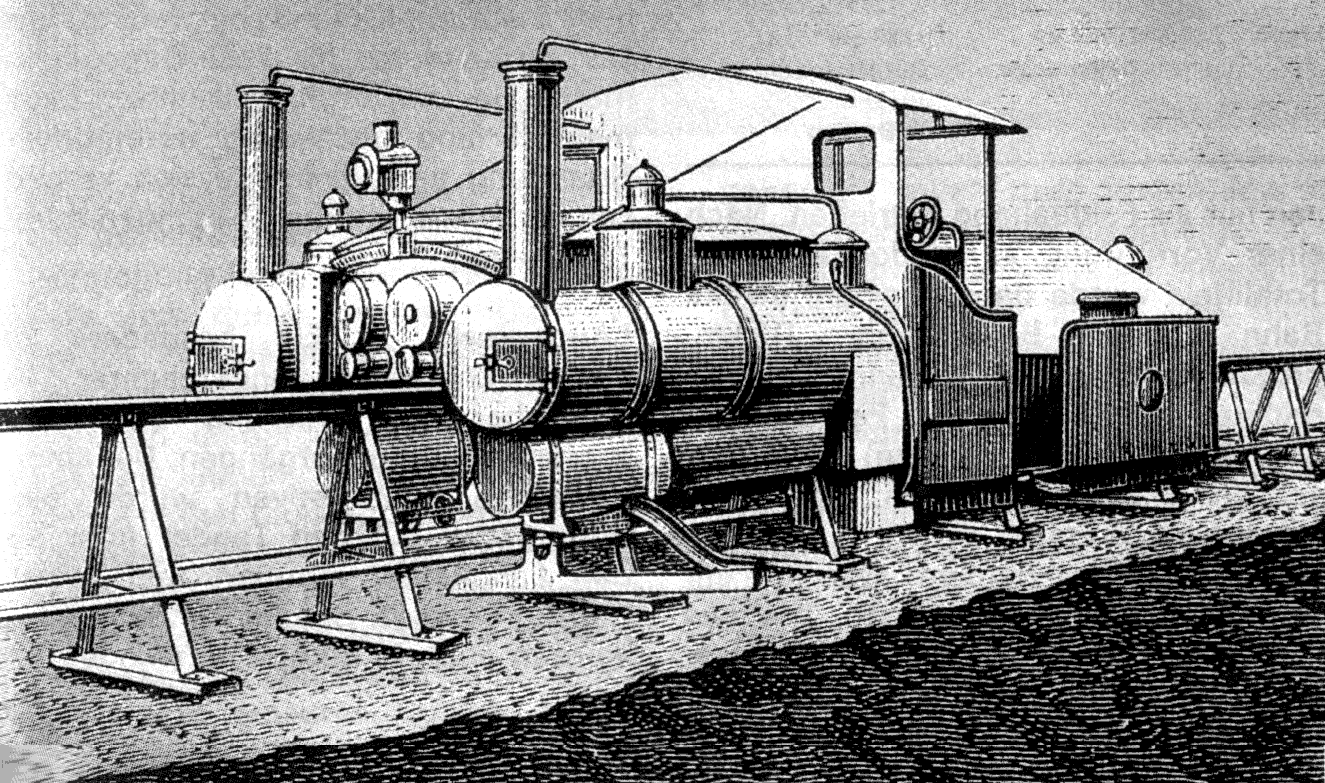
Sketch of a Lartigue locomotive

The Lartigue Monorail system was developed by the French engineer Charles Lartigue (1834–1907). He further developed a horse drawn monorail system, which had been invented by Henry Robinson Palmer in 1821.

Lartigue had seen camels in Algeria carrying heavy loads balanced in panniers on their backs. This inspired him to design a new type of railway. Instead of the conventional two parallel rails on the ground, it had a single rail sitting above the sand and held at waist height on A-shaped trestles. The carriages sat astride the trestles like panniers.

The most famous Lartigue railway was the Listowel and Ballybunion Railway in Ireland which ran for 36 years from 1888.

Despite how it is referred to, the Lartigue system was not truly a monorail, since it was necessary to add two further rails, one on each side, lower down the A frames. These did not carry any weight, but unpowered stabilising wheels fitted to all the engines and wagons contacted these extra rails to prevent the vehicles from overbalancing.

== Listowel and Ballybunion Railway ==
Route of the Listowel and Ballybunion Railway

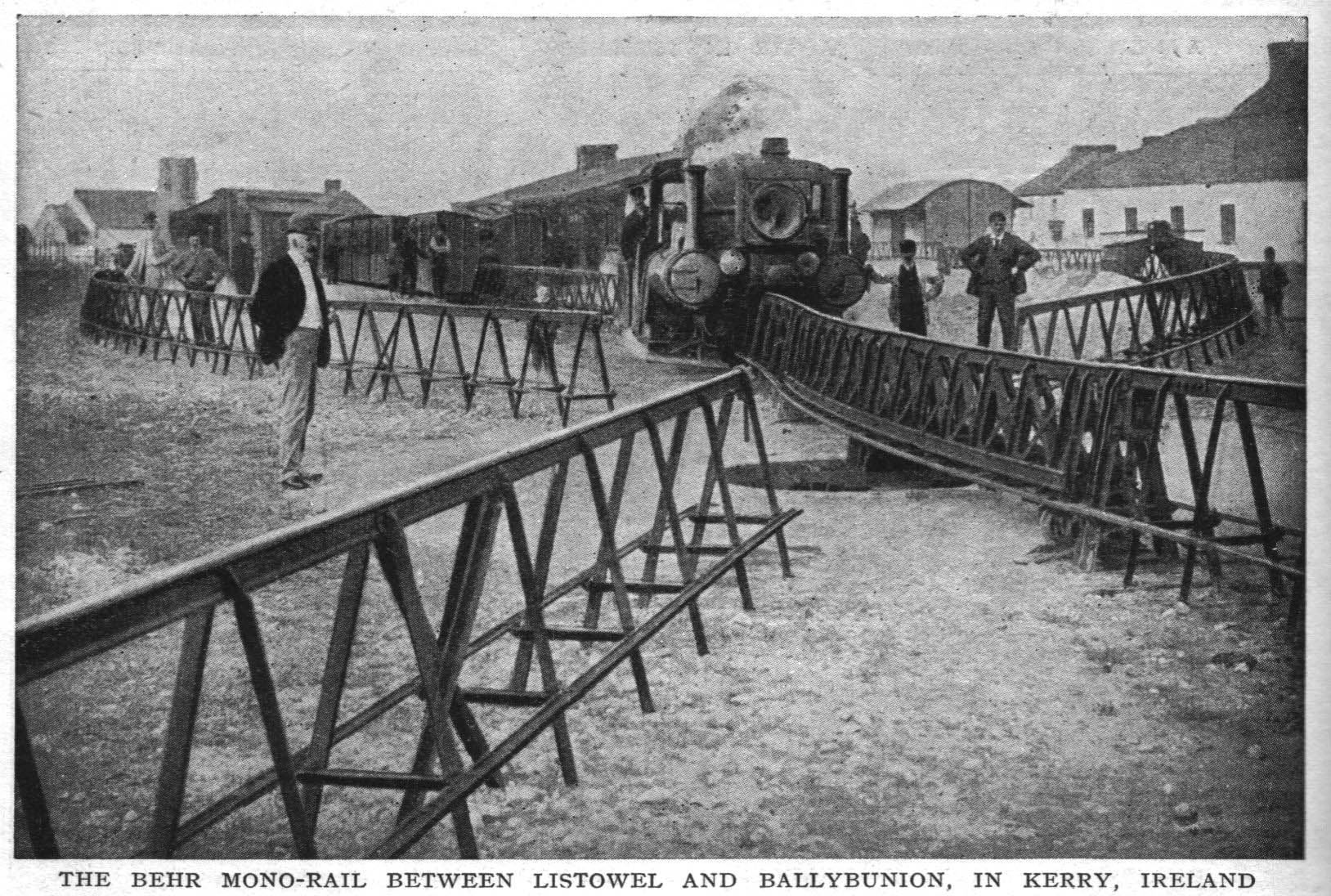
Junction on Listowel and Ballybunion Railway

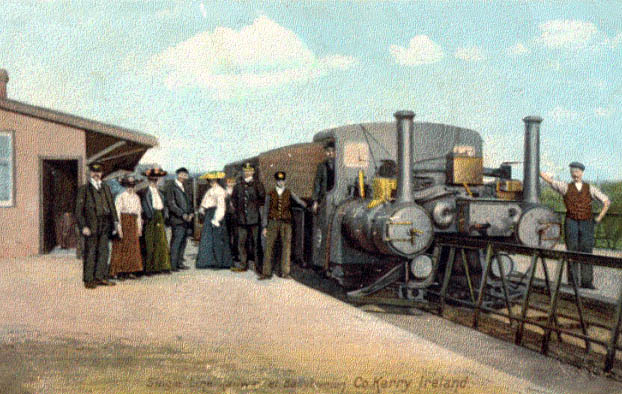
Ballybunion

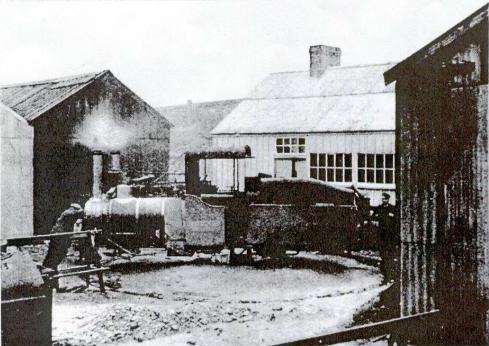
Turntable at Listowel

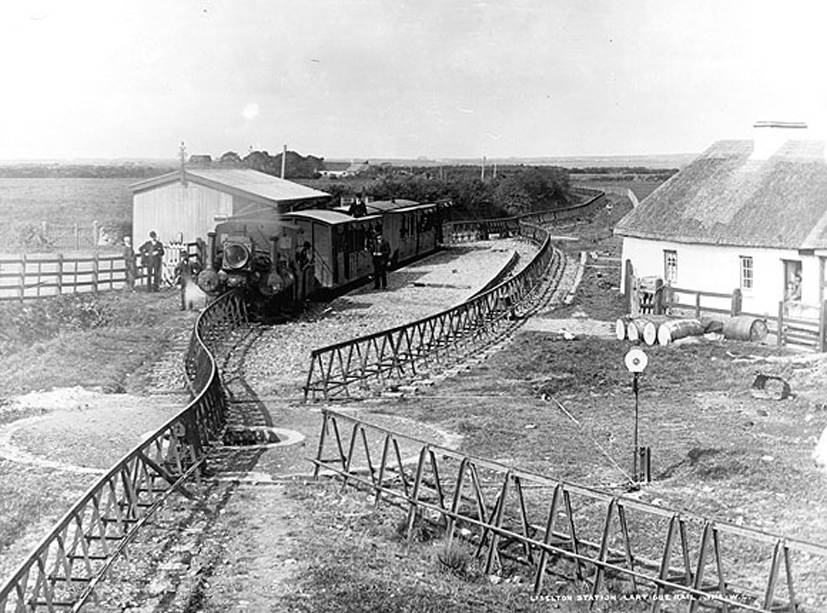
Passing loop at Lisselton

This was a 14.4 km (8.9 mi) monorail built on the Lartigue principle in County Kerry in Ireland. It linked Ballybunion with the North Kerry line at Listowel. It had one intermediate station and a passing loop at Lisselton. The line ran beside the main Listowel/Ballybunion road (R553). It officially opened on 29 February 1888, public services beginning on 5 March. The track was prefabricated and easily erected, and the capital cost was £33,000, far lower than a conventional railway. No baronial guarantees were sought. However, the system had significant operating drawbacks.

Loads had to be evenly balanced. If a farmer wanted to send a cow to market, he would have to send two calves to balance it, which would travel back on opposite sides of the same freight wagon, thereby balancing each other.

Another problem with using the Lartigue system in populated areas was that, due to the track's design, it was not possible to build conventional level crossings. In order for a road to cross the track, a kind of double-sided drawbridge had to be provided, which required an attendant to operate it. Where farmers' tracks crossed the line there were level crossings based on the principle of a turntable. They were locked and the farmer in question provided with a key. Once unlocked, the track could be swivelled to one side to allow the crossing to be used. Both the swivelling and drawbridge-type crossings were automatically linked to signals, which stopped any approaching trains, and road traffic was always given priority.

Passengers could not pass from one side of a carriage to another while in motion. A kind of footbridge was built into one end of some of the passenger coaches, while at least one such bridge was carried on a separate wagon. That allowed passengers to cross from one side of the train to the other when stopped at a station.

Conventional railway points could not be used, so a similar function was fulfilled by a large number of curved movable pieces of track which, when rotated one way, would connect the main and one other track. When turned end-for-end, the curve went in the opposite direction, and so connected the main and a different track. The devices could not be called turntables because they could only be moved when there was no rolling stock on them. There was, however, a turntable at each terminus.

The three locomotives were of the 0-3-0 type, constructed by the Hunslet Engine Company. They were specially built with two boilers to balance on the track, and consequently two fireboxes, one of which had to be stoked by the driver. They were also fitted with powered tenders for auxiliary use on hills. The tender wheels were driven by two cylinders via spur gears. Two small chimneys were fitted to each tender to discharge the exhaust steam from those cylinders. A smaller engine, nicknamed the "coffee pot", was used in the construction of the railway, having been used previously on a demonstration line at Tothill Fields in London. It can be seen in an early photo of 1888. The rolling stock, both wagons and carriages, were made by the Falcon Engine & Car Works of Loughborough.

The track, installations and rolling stock were damaged during the Irish Civil War of 1922–23, but services continued. However, the failure to include the railway in the Great Southern Railways, the company created by the Irish Government to run the railways in the Irish Free State, left the financially struggling operation no choice but to close. The last train ran on 14 October 1924 and everything was scrapped, except a short section of the track.

=== Accidents ===
On 29 September 1889, a passenger train was derailed near Galey bridge, probably as a result of sabotage to the line. Several bolts were found to have been removed from the track and discarded some distance away. Fortunately no-one was injured.

On 28 November 1907, a double-headed train on a busy race day collided with some sleepers on a trestle and derailed.

On 14 October 1914, a train heading towards Listowel reached Moybella at 18.00 and hit James Lynch, a milesman, who died from his injuries.

=== Restoration ===
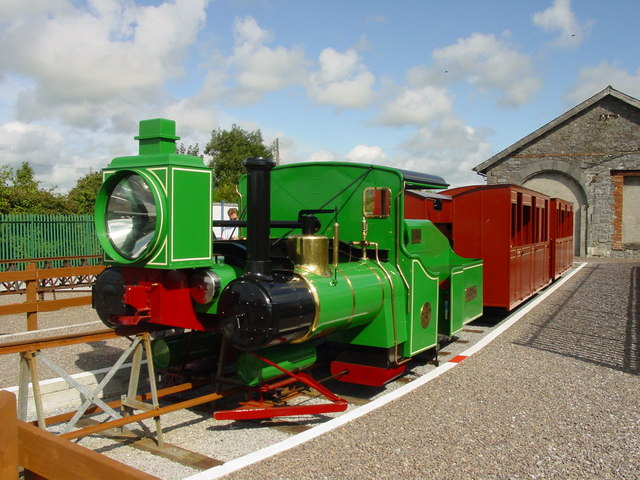
The new Lartigue locomotive

In 2003 the Lartigue Monorailway Restoration Committee, a voluntary organisation from Listowel, opened a 1-kilometre (0.6 mi) section of Lartigue monorail on the trackbed of the former North Kerry line in Listowel. Visitors to the site Lartigue Monorail and Museum can take a demonstration monorail trip and learn about the history of the Lartigue Monorail. The line is worked by a diesel locomotive built to resemble the original 0-3-0 steam engines. The locomotive and its train of replica coaches were built by Alan Keef Ltd.

== Other examples of Lartigue monorails ==
=== Built ===
By 1875 Lartigue had built a 90 km (56 mi) monorail to transport esparto grass from Oran to Damesne across the Algerian desert, with mules pulling trains of panniers that straddled the elevated rail. The line was closed down in 1881.

At exhibitions in Paris and Rouen in 1884, demonstration lines were showcased. These were electrically powered using either the running rail or side rails for conduction to the locomotive.

Following these demonstrations, a mineral railway was built at the Ria copper mines in the eastern Pyrenees. This was also electrically powered, with the electricity for ascending trains being generated by the trains descending.

In 1886, to promote the Listowel and Ballybunion Railway, a demonstration track was built in Westminster, London. It showed off the features and advantages of the system, including steep gradients, sharp curves, points and level crossings.

A line 17 km (11 mi) long was built in 1895 between Feurs and Panissières, in the French département of Loire. However, it never opened after it failed certification testing in both 1895 and 1896. The track and equipment were scrapped in 1902.

F. B. Behr's 'Lightning Express' concept was shown at the 1897 Brussels International Exposition. This was a development of the Lartigue system which enabled higher speeds using electric power, articulated chassis and two guide rails on either side of the trestle. This demonstration train reached speeds of over 75 miles per hour (121 km/h).

A mountain railway was built between Chilecito and Famatina in La Rioja, Argentina. It was 44 kilometres (27 mi) long and had a maximum gradient of 33%, necessitating the use of rack rails.

=== Not built ===
The Lynton Railway was a planned Lartigue monorail between Filleigh and Lynton in Devon, England. It was approved by an act of parliament in 1886 but was not proceeded with.

The Manchester and Liverpool Express Railway was the closest that the 'Lightning Express' concept came to becoming a reality. This would have been a 34 1/2-mile (55.5 km) long double-track railway with a maximum speed of 110 miles per hour (180 km/h). It would have run between Deansgate in Manchester and Church Street in Liverpool with no intermediate stops, covering the distance in 20 minutes. A joint committee of the major stakeholders in both cities was formed and in May 1899 it reported that the total cost would be £1,487,311. Soon after, the Manchester and Liverpool Electric Railway Syndicate Ltd was formed to construct the line. In 1901, the railway was approved by an act of parliament, however it included a clause which enabled the Board of Trade to require testing of the design at the company's expense to certify the system's safety. The company agreed to build 7 miles (11 km) of the route for this purpose, however the substantial cost of this scared away most of the investors, who did not want to finance the construction of a railway which might never be allowed to open. By 1903, the company had gone bankrupt.

== See also ==
- Epsom Salts Monorail – another balancing monorail
- List of heritage railways in the Republic of Ireland
- History of rail transport in Ireland
- Aldershot Narrow Gauge Suspension Railway
- Wuppertal Suspension Monorail
